= Guys Read =

Web-based literary program for boys

Guys Read logo

Guys Read is a web-based literacy program for boys founded by author Jon Scieszka in 2001. Its mission is "to help boys become self-motivated, lifelong readers" by bringing attention to the issue, promoting the expansion of what is called "reading" to include materials like comic books, and encouraging grown men to be literacy role models.

Scieszka said, "It kind of came out of my experience both as growing up a guy, for starters, and then going into elementary school teaching, where I found that the guy sensibility isn't really appreciated there, mostly that the world of elementary school is probably like 85% women - teachers and librarians." As for how exactly to motivate boys to read, Scieszka said, "I think the best way to do it is to give them things they like to read... What we haven't done with boys is we haven't really given them a broad range of reading. In schools, what's seen as reading is so narrow: it's literary, realistic fiction."

The Guys Read website includes a large list of "books that guys read", instructions as to how to start a Guys Read "field office" (or book club), a blog, and links to many boy-loved authors' websites.

Guys Write for Guys Read, the first book to come out of the program, is a compilation that features over eighty stories and illustrations from noted male authors and illustrators who shared stories from their own childhoods. It contains contributions from Lloyd Alexander, Christopher Paolini, Ned Vizzini, James Howe, Mo Willems, Jack Gantos, Stephen King, Neil Gaiman, and other male children's and young adult authors.

In 2010, Scieszka started the Guys Read Library of Great Reading – collections of original short stories by male and female authors who boys enjoy reading, grouped by genre. The first volume is humor, Guys Read: Funny Business; the second is mystery, Guys Read: Thriller; the third is sports, Guys Read: The Sports Pages. The fourth volume in the collection is sci-fi/fantasy, titled Guys Read: Other Worlds. The fifth volume's theme is nonfiction, titled Guys Read: True Stories. A sixth volume, whose theme is horror, titled Guys Read: Terrifying Tales, was released on September 1, 2015. This was followed by another volume called Guys Read: Heroes and Villains, in April 2017.

== Guys Read books ==
=== Initial Guys Read book ===
- Guys Write for Guys Read - Viking Press - 2005

=== Guys Read anthologies ===
- Guys Read: Funny Business - contributors: Mac Barnett, David Yoo, Patrick Carman, Christopher Paul Curtis, Kate DiCamillo, Paul Feig, Eion Colfer, Jack Gantos, Jeff Kinney, David Lubar, Adam Rex - Walden Pond Press - 2010
- Guys Read: Thriller - contributors: M. T. Anderson, Gennifer Choldenko, Matt de la Peña, Margaret Peterson Haddix, Bruce Hale, Jarrett J. Krosoczka, Anthony Horowitz, Walter Dean Myers - Walden Pond Press - 2011
- Guys Read: The Sports Pages - contributors: Gordon Korman, Chris Rylander, Dan Gutman, Anne Ursu, Tim Green, Joseph Bruchac, Jacqueline Woodson, with illustrations by Dan Santat - Walden Pond Press - 2012
- Guys Read: Other Worlds - contributors: Rick Riordan, Tom Angleberger, D. J. MacHale, Rebecca Stead, Ray Bradbury, Shaun Tan, Neal Shusterman, Shannon Hale, Kenneth Oppel, Eric Nylund, and illustrations by Greg Ruth - Walden Pond Press - 2013
- Guys Read: True Stories - contributors: Jim Murphy, Elizabeth Partridge, Nathan Hale, James Sturm, Candace Fleming, Douglas Florian, Sy Montgomery, Steve Sheinkin, T. Edward Nickens, Thanhha Lai - Walden Pond Press - 2014
- Guys Read: Terrifying Tales - contributors: Adam Gidwitz, R.L. Stine, Dav Pilkey, Michael Buckley, Claire Legrand, Nikki Loftin, Adele Griffin, Kelly Barnhill, Lisa Brown, Daniel José Older, Rita Williams-Garcia, and illustrations by Gris Grimly - Walden Pond Press - 2015
- Guys Read: Heroes & Villains, contributors: Christopher Healy, Sharon Creech, Cathy Camper, Laurie Halse Anderson, Ingrid Law, Deborah Hopkinson, Pam Muñoz Ryan, Eugene Yelchin, Jack Gantos, Lemony Snicket - Walden Pond Press - 2017

== Guys Read field offices ==
Guys Read field offices are reading clubs held in homes, classrooms, libraries and bookstores. They are located in 28 U.S. States, as well as Mexico, Canada, Ireland, Scotland, and Australia.
