= Claire Legrand =

American writer of children's and young adult literature

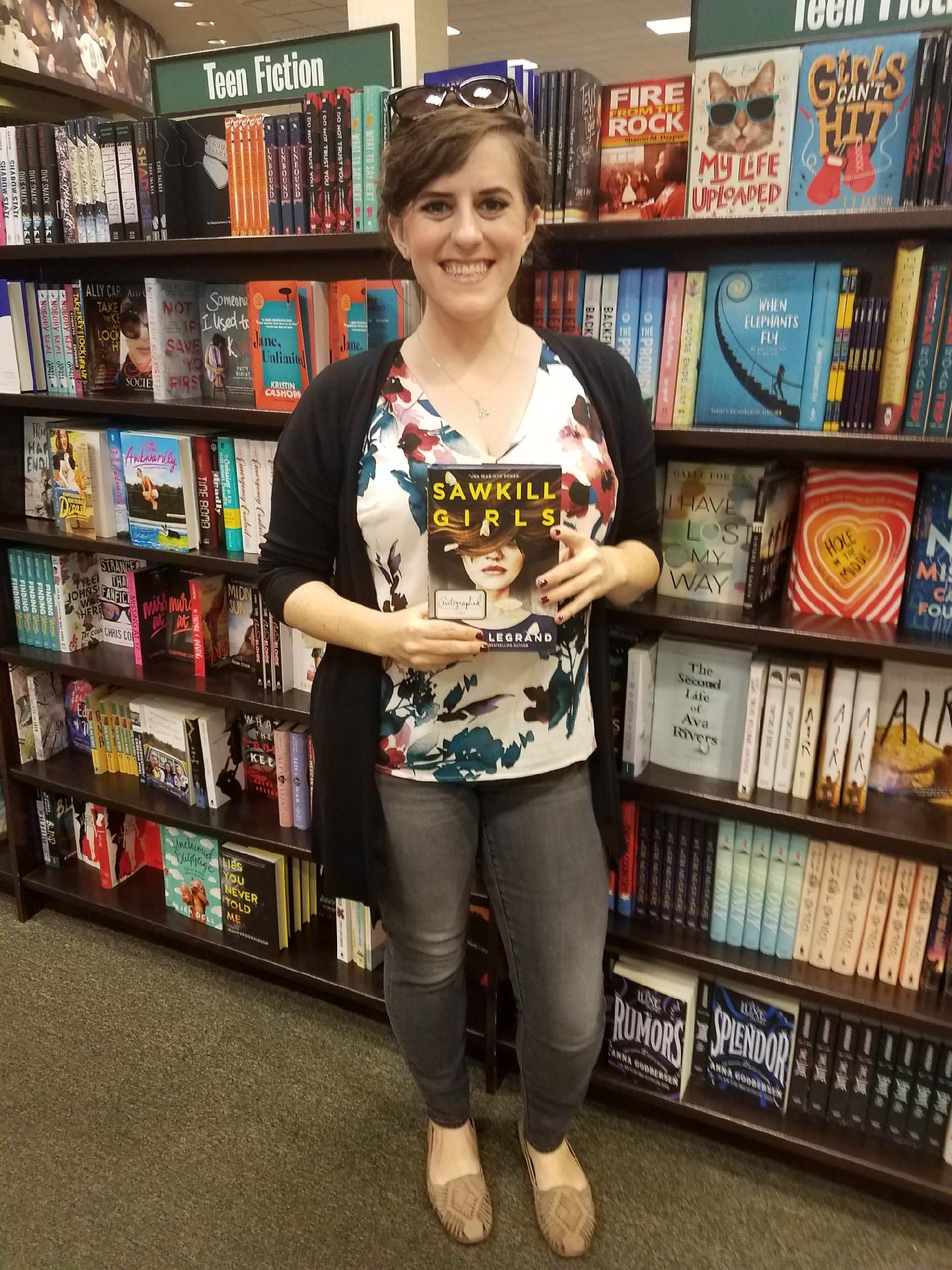
- Legrand in October 2018
- Born: Irving, Texas, U.S.
- Education: University of North Texas (BA, MSLS)
- Occupations: Writer, librarian
- Writing career
- Genres: Science fiction, fantasy, children's literature, young adult fiction
- Notable work: The Empirium Trilogy
- Notable awards: 2017 Edgar Award finalist, 2018 Bram Stoker Award finalist, 2019 Lambda Literary Award finalist
- Website: claire-legrand.com

Claire Legrand is an American writer of children's and young adult literature, including novels and short stories. She is best known for her New York Times bestselling Empirium trilogy, published by Sourcebooks Fire.

== Personal life ==
Legrand is from North Texas but now resides in Princeton, New Jersey, where she worked as a librarian. She is now a full time author. Legrand graduated from the University of North Texas with a Bachelor of Arts in English Literature and a Master of Science in Library Science. Initially, she planned to study music before switching to major in English. Legrand remains passionate about music and creates playlists for each of her published novels.

== Career ==
Legrand published her debut novel, The Cavendish Home for Boys and Girls, in August 2012 with Simon & Schuster Books for Young Readers. After its release, the middle grade novel was recognized as nominee for two children's book award: the Michigan Mitten Award and the Dorothy Canfield Fisher Book Award.

Legrand's second book, The Year of Shadows, released a year later in August 2013.

In 2014, Legrand released Winterspell (September 2014), along with Summerfall (August 2014), a prequel novella, and Homecoming (December 2014), an epilogue available online in e-book form that is available for free on her author website. This set of stories was her first published work that fell into the category of young adult instead of middle grade. Legrand was also one of four contributors to The Cabinet of Curiosities: 36 Tales Brief & Sinister, an anthology book that released in May 2014.

Legrand has been included in two other anthologies to date, Guys Read: Terrifying Tales (September 2015) and Been There, Done That: Writing Stories from Real Life (November 2015).

Her fourth full length novel, Some Kind of Happiness, released in May 2016. This was a return to middle grade writing, and it was nominated for the 2017 Edgar Award, as well as being included in Publishers Weekly's Best Book of the Year list and the New York Library's Best Book for Children list. In October 2016, she released Foxheart, her fifth novel and fourth middle grade book.

In November 2017, advanced copies of Legrand's upcoming young adult fantasy, Furyborn, were featured in a book subscription box, Fairyloot. When the book released in May 2018, it debuted at #4 on the New York Times Best Seller List. Furyborn was also listed as a Kids' Indie Next Pick for their Summer 2018 list. Furyborn is the first book of the Emperium trilogy, the series Legrand is best known for. Book two of the trilogy, Kingsbane, also debuted in the #4 spot on the NYT List a year later in May 2019, and the third book, Lightbringer, released in October 2020.

Legrand's seventh novel, Sawkill Girls, was another young adult horror standalone and released in October 2018. Notably, it was nominated for both a Lambda Award and the Bram Stoker Award.

Her tenth novel, Thornlight, released in April 2021 and was chosen as a Spring 2021 Kids' Indie Next Pick. This book is her latest middle grade novel to date.

Her eleventh novel, Extasia, released in February 2022 and was chosen as a March/April 2022 Kids' Indie Next Pick. It is a return to young adult horror.

In May 2023, Legrand is set to release her twelfth novel and first adult book, A Crown of Ivy and Glass.

== Bibliography ==
=== Middle grade ===
- The Cavendish Home for Boys and Girls (Simon & Schuster Books for Young Readers, August 28, 2012; illustrated by Sarah Watts)
- The Year of Shadows (Simon & Schuster Books for Young Readers, August 27, 2013; illustrated by Karl Kwasny)
- Some Kind of Happiness (Simon & Schuster Books for Young Readers, May 17, 2016)
- Foxheart (Greenwillow Books, October 4, 2016; illustrated by Jaime Zollars)
- Thornlight (Greenwillow Books, April 20, 2021; illustrated by Jaime Zollars)

=== Young adult ===
Winterspell:

- Winterspell (Simon & Schuster Books for Young Readers, September 30, 2014)
- Summerfall (Simon & Schuster Books for Young Readers, August 26, 2014) — Winterspell prequel novella
- Homecoming (available only as a free e-book download from Legrand's website, December 29, 2014) — Winterspell epilogue

Empirium:

- Furyborn (Sourcebooks Fire, May 22, 2018)
- Kingsbane (Sourcebooks Fire, May 21, 2019)
- Lightbringer (Sourcebooks Fire, October 13, 2020)

Standalones

- Sawkill Girls (Katherine Tegen Books, Oct 2, 2018)
- Extasia (Katherine Tegen Books February 22, 2022)

=== Adult ===
The Middlemist Trilogy:

- A Crown of Ivy and Glass (Sourcebooks Fire, May 9, 2023)
- A Song of Ash and Moonlight (Sourcebooks Fire, September 17, 2024)
- A Rose of Blood and Binding (Sourcebooks Fire, February 24, 2026)

=== Others ===
- The Cabinet of Curiosities: 36 Tales Brief & Sinister (Greenwillow Books, May 27, 2014) — a book of short stories by Stefan Bachmann, Katherine Catmull, Emma Trevayne, and Legrand; illustrated by Alexander Jansson
- Guys Read: Terrifying Tales: (Walden Pond Press, Sep 1 2015) — a book of short stories by Kelly Barnhill, Michael Buckley, Adam Gidwitz, Adele Griffin and Lisa Brown, Nikki Loftin, Daniel José Older, Dav Pilkey, R.L. Stine, Rita Williams-Garcia and Claire Legrand; edited by Jon Scieszka
- Been There, Done That: Writing Stories from Real Life (Grosset & Dunlap, Nov 3 2015) — a diverse collection of short stories by Gary D. Schmidt, Linda Sue Park, Grace Lin, Matthew J. Kirby, Adam Rex, Jane Yolen, Heidi Y. Stemple, Rita Williams-Garcia, Karen Cushman, Caroline Starr Rose, Lisa Yee, Nathan Hale, Julia Alvarez, Kate Messner, Margarita Engle, Alan Lawrence Sitomer, Tracy Edward Wymer, Dee Garretson and Legrand; edited by Mike Winchell, illustrated by Eglantine Ceulemans
- The Mandigore (short story published in "Guys Read: Terrifying Tales")
