= Bruchac =

Bruchac is a surname. Notable people with the surname include:

- Jesse Bruchac (born 1972), American author and language teacher
- Joseph Bruchac (born 1942), American author
