= Selu =

SELU or selu may refer to:

- Sailu, a town in Maharashtra, India, also known as Selu
- Scaled exponential linear unit, an activation function for artificial neural networks
- Southeastern Louisiana University
- Cherokee mythology for maize
- Selu: Seeking the Corn-Mother's Wisdom, a book by Marilou Awiakta
