= Bible translations into Native American languages =

Biblical translations into the indigenous languages of North and South America have been produced since the 16th century.

== Algonquian languages ==
=== Abenaki ===
Mark, translated by Peter Wzokhilain, was printed in 1830. It was republished in 2011 by Jesse Bruchac.

=== Anishinaabemowin ===
==== Algonquin ====
Roger and Ruth Spielmann of Wycliffe Bible Translators together with local Algonquin people, translated a new translation into modern Algonquin. John was published in 1993. The complete New Testament was published in 1998.

| Translation | John 3:16 | |
| | Original text (vowel length shown) | Fiero Orthography |
|---|---|---|
| Spielmann 1998 | Kije Manidò megà epìtci sàgiàdjin aȣiagòn, ogì pìdjinijaȣàn Ogȣizisan kà motci pejigondjin. Kakina dac aȣiagòg ke tebȣetaȣàdjin Kije Manidòn Ogȣizisini, kàȣìn kàda ȣanicisìȣag, tiegodj ogà aiànàȣà kàgige pimadiziȣini. | Gizhe-Manidoo megaa epiichi-zaagi'aajin awi'agoon, ogii-biijinizhawaan Ogwizisan gaa-mochi-bezhigonjin. Gakina dash awi'agoog ge-debwetawaajin Gizhe-Manidoo Ogwizisini, gaawiin gaada-wanishisiiwag, di-egoj ogaa-ayaanaawaa gaagige-bimaadiziwini. |

==== Massachusett ====
The Eliot Indian Bible was produced in 1663 by Puritan missionary John Eliot. Mamusse Wunneetupanatamwe Up Biblum God on the cover page of the translated Bible means The Whole Holy His-Bible God, both Old Testament and also New Testament. It is a complete a translation of all 66 books (Old Testament and New Testament) in the Geneva Bible into the indigenous Massachusett language.

==== Ojibwa ====
The first portion of the Bible in Ojibwa, part of the Algonquian language family in Canada, was the Gospels of St Matthew and St John, translated by Peter and John Jones and printed in 1829-31. There are three complete translations of the New Testament in this language: One by Edwin James in 1833, another by Henry Blatchford in 1844 (reprinted in 1856 and 1875), and a third by Frederick O'Meara in 1854 (reprinted in 1874). O'Meara also translated the Psalms (1856) and the Pentateuch (1861), and Robert McDonald translated the Twelve Minor Prophets (1874). Jim Keesic translated about fifty percent of the old testament, and revised the New Testament. This was published by the Canadian Bible Society in August 2008. Bob Bryce and Henry Hostetler also worked on this project.

Jonathan Meeker's translation of Matthew and John in the Ottawa dialect appeared in 1841-44. P. Jones's Ottawa dialect translation of Genesis was published in 1835 by the Toronto Auxiliary Bible Society.

Mark and John have also been translated into the Ojicree dialect.

| Translation | John 3:16 | |
|---|---|---|
| | Original text | Fiero Orthography |
| Jones 1831 | Apeech zhahwaindung sah Keshamunedoo ewh ahkeh, ooge-oonje megewanun enewh atah tatabenahwa Kahoogwesejin, wagwain dush katapwayainemahgwain chebahnahdezesig, cheahyong dush goo esh kahkenig pemahtezewin. | Aapij zhawendang sa Gizhe-manidoo iw aki, ogii-onji-miigiwenaan iniw eta dedebinawe Gaa-ogwisijin, wegwen dash ge-debweyenimaagwen ji-banaadizisiig, ji-ayaang dash go ish gaaginig bimaadiziwin. |
| James 1833 | Kitche Manito azhe sȃgitōt áke, me wanje megewat onezheka oguisun, owwagwan ga tabwatumōgwan kȃ tuh wunnisshinze, tuh gȃgegȃ bemátizze. | Gichi-manidoo ezhi-zaagitood aki, mii wenji-miigiwed nizhike-ogwisan, owegwen ge-debwetamoogwen gaa da-wanishinzii, da-gaagige-bimaadizi. |
| O'Meara 1854 | Kahahpeech-shahwandung owh Kesha-Muhnedoo ewh uhkee oogeöonjemegewanun tebenuhwa oogwissun nuhyatahwezenejin, ahwagwan dush duhyabwayanemahgwan chebahnahdezesig, cheähyaung suh dush ewh Kahgega-bemahdezewin. | Gaa-aapij zhawendang ow Gizhe-manidoo iw aki ogii-onji-miigiwenaan dibinawe ogwisan nayetaawizinijin, awegwen dash dayebweyenimaagwen ji-banaadizisiig, ji-ayaang sa dash iw gaagige-bimaadiziwin. |
| Blatchford 1875 | Gaapij shauendʋ̱ sʋ Kishemanito iu aki, ogionjimigiuenʋn iniu baiezhigonijin Oguisʋn, aueguen dʋsh getebueienimaguen jibʋnatizisig, jiaiat dʋsh iu kagige bimatiziuin. | Gaa-aapij zhawendang sa Gizhe-manidoo iw aki, ogii-onji-miigiwenaan iniw bayezhigonijin Ogwisan, awegwen dash ge-debweyenimaagwen ji-banaadizisiig, ji-ayaad dash iw gaagige-bimaadiziwin. |
| Canadian Bible Society 2008 | ᐋᓃᔥ ᑭᔐᒪᓂᑑ ᐁᐲᒋᔕᐌᓂᒫᒡ ᐯᒫᑎᓯᓂᒡ ᐊᑮᕽ, ᑮᒦᑭᐌ ᐁᐯᔑᑯᓂᒡ ᐅᑯᓯᓴᓐ, ᐊᐌᓀᓇᓐ ᐃᑕᔥ ᐃᑯ ᑫᑌᐺᔦᓂᒫᒡ, ᐁᑳ ᒋᓂᔑᐗᓈᑎᓯᓯᒃ, ᒋᐊᔮᒡ ᐃᑕᔥ ᐃᐃᐌᓂ ᐱᒫᑎᓯᐎᓐ ᐐᑳ ᑫᐃᔥᒀᓭᓯᓂᓂᒃ᙮ | aaniish gizhe-manidoo epiichi-zhawenimaaj bemaadizinij akiing, gii-migiwe e-bezhigonij ogozisan, awenenan idash igo ge-debweyenimaaj, egaa ji-nishiwanaadizisig, ji-ayaaj idash i'iweni bimaadiziwin wiikaa ge-ishkwaasesininig. |

- New Testament (O'Meara 1854)
- New Testament (James 1833)
- New Testament (Blatchford 1875)

==== Potawatomi ====
Matthew and the Acts were translated by Johnston Lykins and published by the British and Foreign Bible Society in 1844.

| Translation | Matthew (Mrto) 6:9-13 |
|---|---|
| Lykins 1844 | Otisi ktali matumawa; Nosnan ren lpumuk kelkok, krhnrntaquk ktilnukaswun; Kto kumau'wun kupermkit. Nohma ktrnrntumwun knomkit loti kek, krhwa lpumuk kelkok. Melinak oti nkom rkelkewuk rtso kelkuk, rlwesineak. Epe ponrntumwilnak misnukinanin nenankr rlponrnmukit mrhetotmoeimit, misnumoeumkrleik. Epe krko lonilekak krtli qhiteprnmukoeak, otapinilnak hyrk mranuk; ken ktuprntan okumauwun, epe klkr rwsuwun, epe ew khinrntaqsuwin kakuk. Rmrn. |
| Lykins 1844 (in quasi-modern spelling) (ă and ĭ today are written as e) | Otĭsĭ ktashĭ matămawa; Nosnan éin shpămăk kishkok, kécnéntakwăk ktĭshnăkaswăn, Kto kămaă’wăn kăpiémkĭt. Nocma kténéntămwăn knomkĭt shotĭ kik, kécwa shpămăk kishkok. Mishĭnak otĭ nkom ékishkiwăk étso kishkăk, éshwisĭniak. ĭpi ponéntămwĭshnak mĭsnăkĭnanĭn ninanké éshponénmăkĭt mécitotmoiĭmĭt, mĭsnămoiămkéshiĭk. ĭpi kéko shonĭshikak kétshĭ kwcĭtipénmăkoiak, otapĭnĭshnak cayék méanăk; kin ktăpéntan okămaăwăn, ipi kshké éwsăwăn, ipi iw kcĭnéntakwsăwĭn kakăk. Émén. |

=== Arapaho ===
The first Bible portion in Arapaho language (Algonquian family) was translated by John Kliewer, a Mennonite missionary, who translated Matthew 9:1-8. This was published with commentary in a ten-page pamphlet by Wm. J. Krehbiel in 1888. The first book was done by John Roberts, an Episcopal missionary, and Michael White Hawk who translated the Gospel of Luke into Arapaho language for the American Bible Society in 1903.

| Translation | Lord's Prayer, from Luke 11:2-4 |
|---|---|
| Roberts & White Hawk (1903) | Hāsaunaunene Nananede hanedaude hejavaa, Vadanauha Nananene haneseede. Nananene hanajanede hanājaunauau. Nananene hathanavāane hadnaasedaunee hasauau hejavaa, nau jee nuu vedauauwuu. Hejevenāa hadauchusenee hayauwusenee vethewau. Nau jejaegudanauwunāa hewauchudaudenedaunau hanau nechau nejaegudanauwunade haunauude hanesāde nethāesayānedanauwunuade. Nau jevaechauhāa nedauvasehadee; hau haugaunayauhāa hehethee hadau wausauau. |
| Roberts & White Hawk (1903) (Modern Orthography) | Heisonoonin neneenit heentoot hihcebe', beteenoohee neneenin heniisih'iit. Neneenin heneeceeniit heneicoonoo'. Neneenin hee3eenebei'een heetnee'eestooni' heesoo' hihcebe', noh ci' nuhu' biito'owuu'. Hiicebenei'ee heetoxuusiini'i heeyowuusiini'i bii3iwo. Noh cihce'ikoutenowuunei'ee howoxutootiiniitono heenoo niixoo nehce'ikoutenowuunoot hono'ut hehniiseihit nii3ei'iseyeinitenowuunei'eet. Noh ciibehyihxohei'ee niitohbeesiheeti'; 'oh hookooneyoohei'ee hihii3iihi' heetohwosoo'. |

- In Arapahoe: Matthew 9, 1-8. trans. by John Kliewer at the Gutenberg Project
- Hethadenee waunauyaunee vadan Luke vanenana: the Gospel according to Saint Luke at Gutenberg and at archive.org.
- Hii3etini'i wonooyooni'i beteen Luke beniineino' (Book Of Luke In Arapaho) : John Roberts; Andrew Cowell Hii3etini'i wonooyooni'i beteen Luke beniineino'] edition transcribed into modern orthography with various notes and glossaries.

=== Blackfoot/Siksika ===
Blackfoot language is part of the Algonquian family. Matthew's gospel was translated by John William Tims and published in 1890 by the British and Foreign Bible Society. He also published "Readings From the Holy Scriptures" containing the first three chapters of Genesis and selections from the gospels. Donald and Patricia Frantz of Wycliffe Bible Translators published their translation of Mark in 1972. The work was taken over by Greg and Angela Thomson, whose gospel of John was published by the Canadian Bible Society in 1979. Shortly afterwards Acts was also released in audio format. Most of Luke has also been translated.

=== Cheyenne ===
Rodolphe Petter, a Swiss linguist, and Mennonite missionary, translated the New Testament and part of the Old Testament into Cheyenne (Algonquian family). His translation of the New Testament was "from the original Greek, with comparison to the Latin Vulgate and other translations". The first portion of the Bible published were some small translations in the Cheyenne Reading Book, published in 1895. Luke and John were printed together in 1902 and again in 1912. The complete New Testament was first published in 1934.

In 1975 Wayne and Elena Leman, of Wycliffe Bible Translators, started a translation of the Bible from the original languages into colloquial Cheyenne. (Petter's translation is in a more formal, literal style). Their translation has the complete text for Luke, Philippians, 1 Peter, 1 John as well as portions from other books. It was dedicated on 28 January 2007.

| Translation | John 3:16 |
|---|---|
| Petter, 1912 | Maheo soss zehešemehotoss hestaneo exhessemeanoz henokoenoxzetto, nonoxpa zehetaeonissyomàtōez' emesaaasetoēhe, onitàz emeáena aenevostanehevestoz. |
| Leman, 2007 | Ma'heo'o tséxhoháeméhotaétse hee'haho ného'eanȯemétaenone. Tséne'étamé'tovótsese hee'haho tsea'eneametanéneo'o. |

=== Delaware/Lenape ===
Abraham Luckenbach Scripture Narratives from the New Testament was published in 1801 followed by his Forty-six selected Scripture Narratives from the Old Testament in 1838. In the in-between time, Dencke's translation of the Epistles of John was printed in 1818 and David Zeisberger's Harmony of the Gospels was published in 1821.

| Translation | John (Johannes) 3:16 |
|---|---|
| Zeisberger 1821 | Ntitechquo Getanittowit wtelgiqui ahowalap Pemhakamixit, wtelli miltinep nekti mehittachpit Quisall: wentschi wemi wulistawachtit mattatsch tawongellowiwak, schuk nachpauchsichtit hallemiwi Pommauchsowagan. |

=== Malecite-Passamaquoddy ===
Silas Rand published with selections from scripture (both the Old and New Testaments) in 1863. This was followed by his translation of John which was published in 1870.

| Translation | John 3:16 |
|---|---|
| London, 1870 | Eebŭchŭl Nŭkskam ĕdooche-moosajĭtpŭn ooskĭtkŭmĭkw wĕjemelooĕtpŭn wĭhwebu Ookwŏŏsŭl, wĕlaman mseu wĕn tan wĕlămsŭtŭk oohŭtĕk, skatŭp ŭksekāhāwe, kānookŭloo ooteĭnp askŭmowsooagŭn. |

=== Meskwaki ===
Richard and Carla Bartsch of Wycliffe Bible Translators translated Luke's gospel, which was published in 1996 by the International Bible Society. Selections from the Bible were published in 2008 by Wycliffe.

=== Mi'kmaq ===
Mi'kmaw language is part of the Algonquian family. In 1844, the Gospel of Mark was translated into Mi'kmaq (formerly Micmac) by Native Evangelist Paul Osunkhirine. St Matthew's Gospel was translated in 1853 by Silas Rand. He then continued to translate the entire New Testament, which was published in 1871 as Pelā Kesagǔnoodǔmǔkawa. He also translated and had published Genesis, Exodus, and the Psalms. Rand translated into Mi'kmaq from Hebrew and Greek. A new version of the New Testament was published in Mi'kmaq in 1999. The work was coordinated by Wycliffe Bible Translators, Watson and Marilyn Williams, both of whom dedicated nearly 30 years to the completion of the work. The team included three translation assistants, Manny Metallic, Nellie Wysote, and Marion Wilmot, community members, and others. Chiefs Ronald Jacques and the late Alphonse Metallic, and the Canadian Bible Society were also recognized for their work on the Bible.

| Translation | John 3:16 |
|---|---|
| Rand 1875 | Mǔdǔ Nĭkskam tĕlĭksătkǔp oosĭtkǔmoo' wĕjeĭgǔnǔooĕogǔb'ǔnǔl nāŏŏktoobĭstăjŭl Ookwĭsŭl, koolaman' 'msĭt wĕn tan kĕdlămsŭtkŭl ootenĭnk, moo ŭksŭgawĭs, kadoo ooskos' ăpchememăooŏkŭn. |

- Mark's Gospel (Rand 1874, from Internet Archive)

=== Naskapi ===
The New Testament was translated by the language and translation department of the Naskapi Development Corporation, Kawawachikamach Quebec, and Wycliffe Bible Translators. Key people involved in the translation were Bill Jancewicz and Silas Nabinicaboo. Genesis was also translated. The New Testament was published in 2007 by the Canadian Bible Society and simultaneously by the Naskapi Development Corporation.

| Translation | John (ᒠᓐ) 3:16 |
|---|---|
| Jancewicz 2007 | ᐛᔅ ᒋᓴᒪᓂᑐᐤ ᐊᐃᔅᐱᔅ ᒋ ᓴᒋᐊᑦ ᒥᓯᐛ ᐊᐛᔪᐛ ᐅᑕ ᐊᔅᒋᒡ ᒋ ᒥᔨᐛᐤ ᑲ ᐸᐃᑯᓯᔨᒋ ᐅᑯᓴ, ᒥᓯᐛ ᐊᐛᔪᐛ ᑲ ᑕᑈᔭᔨᒪᔨᒋ ᒐᐊᑲᒋ ᓂᓱᐅᓇᑎᓯᔨᒋ ᒪᒃ ᒐᒋ ᐊᔭᔨᒡ ᑲᒋᒡ ᐱᒪᑎᓯᐅᓂᔪᐤ᙮ |

=== Shawnee ===
Matthew, translated by Johnston Lykins, was printed in 1836 and a revision in 1842, and John, translated by Francis Barker was published in 1846. A translation of John was published in 1858, perhaps a revision of Barker's. The four gospels, translated by Thomas W. Alford (Ganwrpiahsikv) was published in 1929.

| Translation | John 3:16 |
|---|---|
| Alford 1929 (unverified) | Xvga yone u tasi vhqalatv Mvnatu ini yalakuqvh-kvmigigi, waciganvhi meliwa u nakudo-srkvnvli u Qihfvli, wvhsi goqa-nafvgrci dapwahtv-wrta nili bur iqinaci, wakv bonvgi goqa-lrqvsi lanvwawewa. |

=== Wampanoag ===
The Wampanoag language or "Massachuset language" (Algonquian family) was the first North American Indian language into which any Bible translation was made; John Eliot began his Natick version in 1653 and finished it in 1661-63, with a revised edition in 1680-85. It was the first Bible to be printed in North America.

In 1709 Experience Mayhew published his translation, in the Martha's Vineyard dialect, of the Psalms and John's Gospel.

| Translation | John 3:16 |
|---|---|
| John Eliot (1685) | Newutche GOD wussaúmowomantam muttáok, newaj maguk wunnukquttegheonoh onk howan wunnamptauont matta who awakompanau, qut who ohtau micheme pomantamóonk. |
| Experience Mayhew (1709) | Newutćhe God wuttunukuhque wômontamunap muttaohk, ummâkunnát wunnukqutekehônoh, onk nishnoh howan wanômuhtauont, who matta auwohkuhpuno∞, qut who ohto mićhemohtae pomontam∞onk. |

- Digitalization Project

== Caddoan languages ==
=== Arikara ===
Bible translations and hymns in the Ree or Saniś language., Fort Berthold Mission, 1905.

== Iroquoian languages ==
=== Cherokee ===
External Links:

- Old and New Testaments Cherokee Bible Project

=== Mohawk ===
In Mohawk (an Iroquoian language), extracts from the Bible were printed as early as 1715. The Gospel of St Mark, by Joseph Brant, in 1787; and St John, by John Norton, in 1804. Between 1827 and 1836 the rest of the New Testament (except 2 Corinthians) was translated by H. A. Hill, W. Hess, and J. A. Wilkes, and the whole was printed in successive parts. The first part of the Old Testament in Mohawk is Isaiah, translated by William Hess, and printed in 1839. A new version of the Gospels, translated by Chief Joseph Onasakenrat, and reviewed by Jean Dion and P. Laforte, was printed in 1880. Onasakenrat was working on completing translating the Bible, but only got till Hebrews, dying before it was completed, his manuscript was never published. Jonah, Daniel, Ruth, Esther, and 2 Corinthians have been recently translated by a team of Mohawk Bible Translators led by Mavis Etienne. They are working on completing the Mohawk Bible translation. Wycliffe Bible Translators is involved.

| Translation | John 3:16 |
|---|---|
| Norton (1818) | Iken ne Yehovah egh ne s'hakonoronghkwa n'ongwe, nene rodewendeghton nene raonháon rodewedon rohháwak, nene onghka kiok teyakaweghdaghkon raonhage yaghten a-onghtonde, ok denghnon aontehodiyendane ne eterna adonhéta. |
| Onasakenrat (1880) | Aseken ne Niio tsini sakohnoronk8ahon nonk8e, iah tatesakohnonhianiheki n'enskat ok ro8iraien, asakaon tosa aiahiheie tsini iakon tiaka8etakon raonhake, ok eken tanon neh aiakoientake ne raonhake aietsenri atsennonniat. |

- Mohawk Audio Bible
- Mark (Brant translation—from Google books)
- Luke (Hill translation—from Google books)
- John (Norton translation—from Google books)
- Acts (Hill/Hess translation—from Google books)
- Isaiah (Hess translation—from Google books)
- Gospels (Onasakenrat translation—from Internet Archive)

=== Oneida ===
David M. Cory translated Luke, and this was published by the American Bible Society in 1942.

=== Seneca ===
Five hundred copies of Luke, translated by Thompson S. Harris, was printed in 1829 by the American Bible Society. The Four Gospels, translated by Asher Wright, were published in 1874.

| Translation | John 3:16 |
|---|---|
| American Bible Society (1878) | Neħ să̱ħ'ă̱h ne' sòħjih' hanò'o̱hgwaħ Na'wĕnniyòħ' he'yo̱ă̱njadeħ, Neħ No'awak neħ' sho̱' kuh sgat howi'yă̱yă̱ħ totgaħwa̱h' hao̱gweħdawiih heh yo̱ă̱n'jadeħ'; neħ neh, So̱n'dihgwa'naħot ă̱o̱wa̱i'wagwenniyòs, tă̱ħă̱h' taye'iwahdo̱h', neħgwaa', nă̱yoiwadadyeħ' ă̱ya'goyă̱ndaħt' ne' yo̱hheħ'o̱weh. |

- Harris' Luke
- Four Gospels (from Google Books)

== Kiowa-Tanoan languages ==
=== Tewa ===
Wycliffe Bible Translator's Randall and Anna Speirs translation of Mark in the Santa Clara dialect was published in 1969. Their translation of James into the San Juan dialect was published in 1973.

Mark, Luke, Acts, and 1 Peter in the Santa Clara dialect, and John, Romans, Philippians, 1,2 Thessalonians, 1,2 Timothy, Titus, Philemon, James, and 1, 2, 3 John in the San Juan dialect were published together as a volume in 1984 and digitally published in 2012.

Esther Martinez was also involved in this project.

| Translation | John 3:16 |
|---|---|
| 2012 Wycliffe (San Juan dialect) | Yôesi Táḏáḏí tꞌä̖hkí tꞌowa hânho ovâyséegíḏí iví wîˀ ayḏa̖ˀ ûnˀä́ndiˀ imä́gi, heḏiho toˀwên tꞌä̖hkí iví ayvíˀpiyeˀ dívíwhä̖yu̖ˀin háˀto dipeḏée-í hewänbo wówátsi nahándepíˀin dâymáˀve-í. |

=== Southern Tiwa ===
Wycliffe Bible Translators Barbara J Allen and Donna B Gardiner's translation of Mark was published in 1978 and again in 1980, Acts in 1981, John in 1987, James in 1985,

=== Northern Tiwa ===
Mark, translated by David and Alice Hull was published by Wycliffe Bible Translators in 1976. Luke, translated by Corrie Kontak and Janet Kunkel was published in 1992 by Messengers of Christ.

| Translation | Lord's Prayer, from Luke 11:2-4 |
|---|---|
| Messengers of Christ (1992) | Kí-Tǫména Wómoya kʼi-thó ę̂ˀi, tǫ́ chíwto ínó-hǫ́lém-waˀá kôm-hhǫ́-wan-tho. Nó i-wan-píg ǫ-ę́yę kǫ́no-kwíawál-wan-bó nó ku-yôyiyáki. Théuyí nó ku-hléuaméya polę́né kíno-piˀi. Kíno-meul-waˀí onó-tʼeuahlîameya, nó ipínowó-tʼeuahlîamehúm-to wíl tʼôyném nowó-kʼúyúˀi i-ǫ́mámeˀíno. Hhú mónowó-wîapu nó i-euwyâˀan-píw nowó-kʼúyúˀi i-tʼôyaˀi. |

== Mayan languages ==
Mayan languages are subdivided into Huastecan, Yucatecan, Ch'olan, Q'anjobolan, Mamean, and Quichean.

=== Kaqchikel/Cakchiquel (Mayan) ===
- William Cameron Townsend - Evangelical, translated into Kaqchikel language, one of the Mayan languages of Guatemala.

=== Lacandon (Mayan) ===
Philip and Mary Baer of Wycliffe Bible Translators are working on Lacandon language (Mayan family) Bible translation for the 1,000 speakers of Lacandon in Mexico. The New Testament was complete in 1978 and published by the World Bible League as A QUET U T'ɅNO' A RIC'BENO. There has since been progress on the Old Testament.

| Translation | John 3:16 |
|---|---|
| A Quet U T'ʌno' A Ric'beno (1978) | ’Mʌ' ja wirej, a C'ujo' jach manan cu yajquintic tu cotor mac ich yoc'ocab. Rajen tu tuchi'taj u parar turiri'. Rajen tu cotor mac a cu yacsic tu yor ti' cu bin tacbir soc mʌ' u bin erar ich c'ac'. Chen cu bin ts'abʌr u cuxtar munt q'uin. |

== Muskogean family ==
=== Choctaw ===
In Choctaw language (one of the Muskogean languages), three of the Gospels, translated by Alfred Wright, were printed as early as 1831, and the complete New Testament, by Wright and Cyrus Byington, in 1848. There translation of Joshua, Judges and Ruth were published as one volume in 1852. Psalms in 1886 (translated C. Byington and J. Edwards.) and the Pentateuch in 1867. The first and second book of Samuel and the first book of Kings followed in 1913, as did John Edwards translation of 2 Kings. First and Second Samuel and the first book of Kings was drafted by Joseph Dukes and then finalized by Alfred Wright.

Wycliffe Bible Translators working on a translation into modern Choctaw. Jonah and Amos were published separately 1996.

| Translation | John (Chan) 3:16 |
|---|---|
| American Bible Society 1854 | Chihowa yʋt yakni a̱ i̱ hullo fehna kʋt, kʋna hosh yʋmma i̱ ymmikmʋtik illo hosh, amba ai ikcha̱yʋt bilia yo̱ pisa hi o̱. Ushi achʋfa illa holitopa ya̱ auet ima tok. |

=== Koasati (Coushatta) ===
Luke 2:1-20 was published by SIL in 1981. Gene Burnham and David Rising of Wycliffe Bible Translators were working on translation. Bel Abbey was also involved on this project.

=== Mikasukee ===
Mark was translated into Mikasukee by Wycliffe Bible Translators David and Virginia West and was published in 1980. They also published "Stories from Genesis" in 1985.

=== Muskogee/Creek ===
John, translated by Davis and Lykins, was published in 1835. Another version translated by Buckner and Herrod was published in 1860. The New Testament (first published in 1887 and again in 1891, 1895, 1900 and 1906), Genesis (published 1893, reprinted 1908, and 1917) and Psalms (published 1896, reprinted 1917) were translated by Anna Eliza Robertson with the help of many Muskogee (Creek) Christians. They were translated from the original Greek and Hebrew, Robertson knew Greek and other missionaries helped her with the Hebrew. James Ramsey and John Edwards helped with the Old Testament translations of Genesis and Psalms. The New Testament went through five revisions during Robertson's life. The 1906 edition was also reprinted in 1917, 1968, 1972, and 1979. The New Testament was reprinted by Wiyo Publishing Company in 2010.

| Translation | John (Cane) 3:16 |
|---|---|
| American Bible Society 1906 | Hesaketvmese ekvnv vnokece mahat hiyomen orvtet omekv: E'ppuce hvmkuse hecknecvte emvtes, mvn estimvt o estomet oh vkvsamat estemerkekot, hesaketv yuksvsekon ocvren. |

- Mvskoke Bible

== Oto-Manguean languages ==
The Oto-Manguean languages consist of several families:

- Oto-Pamean
- Chinantecan
- Tlapanecan
- Manguean
- Popolocan
- Zapotecan
- Amuzgoan
- Mixtecan

=== Mixtecan ===
Kenneth L. Pike - Evangelical, translated into Mixtec language (Oto-Manguean family)

== Penutian languages ==
=== Gitxsan ===
Alfred E. Price's translation of Luke was published in 1899.

=== Nez Perce ===
Matthew, translated by Spalding, was twice printed (in 1845 and 1871). Both John and the first epistle of John, translated by George Ainslie, appeared in 1876. A harmony of the four gospels, translated by Joseph M. Cataldo, was published in 1914

| Translation | John 3:16 |
|---|---|
| Ainslie, 1876 (unverified) | Atka Godnim ikuiku hatauitki watashph, kunki init awaka lumtai Miats, ka ishinm ipna himtsukuinaku, ipi watu tinulrnú, matu kunkusin wakeswit autsaya. |
| Cataldo, 1914 | Etké Akamkíniku-m kúus imékas-nig úikala-na tilókan-a inés-etéui-yá, ka-kúus-kí éteuit-kí inéz-ini-a Ipním-níg naksiníg Míaz: kauá kunú-azánu ka-kuním Ipné pe-mizkúinek-u, yug-pí uétu i-paléi-nu, métu uákas i-uzé-yu kunku yáin. |

=== Nisga'a ===
James McCullagh's translation of Matthew was published by the Aiyansh Mission in 1895. He later translated the whole New Testament. James was published in 1918

=== Tsimshian/Sm'algyax ===
William Ridley's translation of Matthew was published in 1885, Mark in 1887, Luke in 1887, John in 1889, The letters of Galatians, Ephesians, Philippians, Colossians, Thessalonians, Timothy, Titus and Philemon, James, 1, 2 Peter, 1, 2 John and Jude were published in 1898.

| Translation | John 3:16 |
|---|---|
| William Ridley (1889) | Awil ǥushǥout sheībunt ga Shimoigiat ga Laḵāga halizogut, gunt ginamsh ga gaulū lip da Lthgōlthk gut ga, gunt ligit lip nā ga shimhoudikshit gish nīat althga dum gwātik gut, dum yaǥai gāda da whati shābām gundidōlshit. |

== Salishan languages ==
=== Montana Salish/Kalispel–Pend d'oreille ===
Joseph Giordia's "Lu tel kaimintis kolinzuten kuitlt smiimii" (Some narratives from the Holy Bible") was published by the St. Ignatius Print in 1879.

| Translation | John 3:16 |
|---|---|
| Giordia 1879 | Néłi łu t-Kolinzúten łu gaménchis łu kéligu, u guizełts łu is'chináksi łu skusées. Tas zkúlsts łu skusées ks'chzoguépilems łu skeligu, u pen ksguilguiltems. |
| Giordia 1879; Modern orthography | Nełi łu t K̓ʷlncutn łu x̣menčis łu sqelixʷ u xʷic̓łtc łu i sčnaqsi łu sqʷseʔs. tas skʷuĺsts łu sqʷseʔs qs čc̓xʷeplʔems łu sqelixʷ u pn qs xʷlxiltms. |
| Other translation (As remembered by Salish elder, Pat Pierre) | Nełi łu t k̓ʷlncutn x̣menčis łu sqlqelixʷ u xʷic̓łc łu čnaqs skʷses. tam qs čc̓xʷeplʔems łu sqlqelixʷ u łu tcniłc nem epł nxʷlxiltn ta qe ps hoy. |

== Siouan languages ==
=== Crow/Absaalookah ===
Mark was published in 1979. Acts 1-15 in 1981. 1 Timothy was printed in 1984. 1 Thessalonians, 2 Thessalonians, 1 Timothy, 2 Timothy, Titus, Philemon were published as one volume in 1991. James, Colossians and Galatians were published in 2005. It is hoped that the New Testament can be dedicated in 2012.

=== Dakota/Lakota ===
The Dakota language Bible translation was started with Thomas Williamson and Joseph Renville, a fur trader of French and Dakota descent. Williamson first modified the Latin alphabet to "work" for Dakota, he then spent day after day for two or three winters in Renville's warehouse, reading verse by verse from his French Bible. Renville would then give the Dakota, and Williamson would write it down. They finished Mark and John this way. In 1837 Williamson was joined by Stephen Riggs. Both of them learned Dakota, and then compared the tentative translation with the original Greek.

In 1843 they offered a corrected version of Luke and John to the American Bible Society to be printed. It took nearly 40 years before the full Bible was translated. Williamson never lived to see it finished, as he died in 1879. Their work was revised by Williamson's son, the Rev. John Williamson.

Genesis 1842; Luke and John 1843; New Testament 1865; Holy Bible 1879;

Eugene Buechel published "Wowapi Wakan Wicowoyake Yuptecelapi Kin" (The Abridged Bible Stories) in the Lakota dialect in 1924. It included a selection of texts modeled after the German Biblische Geschichte.

Mercy Poorman, Velma Young, and Ed L. Bausell translated Riggs and Williamson's 1887 John from the Dakota dialect into the Lakota dialect. This was published in 1997 by Tiospaye Bible Baptist. The Lakota Bible Translation Project has translated various small booklets with selections from scripture, and in 2006 published Luke's gospel. The Lakota Bible Translation Project's translators include Jerry Yellowhawk, Rosalie Little Thunder, and Ben Black Bear.

| Translation | John 3:16 |
|---|---|
| Riggs, 1866, 1874 | Wakantanka oyate kin cantewicakiya, heon Cinhintku iśana icage cin wicaqu, qa tuwe awacin kinhan owihanke kte śni, tuka owihanke wanin wiconi yuhe kta. |
| Riggs, 1866, 1874 - Modern Orthography | Wakȟáŋ Tȟáŋka oyáte kiŋ čhaŋtéwičhakhiye, héuŋ Čhiŋčátku išná ičháǧe čiŋ wičhák’u, k’a tuwé waŋží kiŋhán owíhaŋke kte šni, tukhá owíhaŋke wanín wičhóni yukhé kta. |
| Buechel, 1924 | Icin Wakantanka wicasa kin lila tewicahila ca cinca wanjilahci wicak'u na tona wicalapi kin hena nunipi kte sni, tka wiconi oihanke wanice kin yuhapi kte. |

- Dakota Wowapi Wakan (Scan of the full Bible in Dakota via the Smithsonian Libraries)
- Dakota Wowapi Wakan Kin (Scan of the New Testament in Dakota on Google Books)

=== Ho-chunk/Winnebago ===
The four Gospels, Acts, Genesis and chapters 19 and 20 of Exodus were translated by John Stacy and Jacob Stucki and published by the American Bible Society in 1907. Helen Miller published a revised version of these texts in 2009.

| Translation | John (Johngha) 3:16 |
|---|---|
| American Bible Society, 1907 | Hisgexji Maura managre wogixetera deshesgena, Eshana Hinigra herera wogarna, higu peshe harnaxgungi inke d'arnikjanena, eshi wankshighoi hisgeja unkjanena. |

=== Iowa ===
Matthew was translated by Samuel Irvin and William Hamilton. It was published in 1843 by the Ioway and Sac mission press. Exodus 20, Psalm 11 and Psalm 15 were also translated and included in a literacy book printed the same year.

=== Osage ===
"Washashe wageress pahvgreh tse" (Osage: "𐓏𐓘𐓻𐓘𐓻𐓟 𐓏𐓘𐓹𐓟𐓧𐓟𐓲 𐓄𐓛𐓷𐓤𐓧𐓟 𐓊𐓟"), a book with passages from scripture translated by William Regus and William Montgomery was published in 1834. This book includes selections from Proverbs, Genesis, Exodus, Isaiah and the four gospels.

| Translation | John 3:16 |
|---|---|
| Washashe wageress pahvgreh tse, 1834 | Chihova ʌkha mɔshɔ lakewɔlapɔ, Shĩga okhʌnche wɔkiu-hiulapio, eh howɔle ekho-ashĩhle tsashe, ɔhshi ni-shõhshõheh tatshio. |
| Washashe wageress pahvgreh tse, 1834; 2006 Orthography | |
| Washashe wageress pahvgreh tse, 1834; 2014 Revised Orthography | 𐒵𐓣𐓡𐓪𐓷𐓘 𐓘𐓸𐓘 𐓨𐓘͘𐓻𐓘͘ 𐓧𐓘𐓤𐓟𐓷𐓘͘𐓧𐓘𐓬𐓘͘, 𐓇𐓣͘𐓤𐓘 𐓪𐓸𐓘͘𐓩𐓝𐓟 𐓷𐓘͘𐓦𐓶-𐓢𐓶𐓧𐓘𐓬𐓣𐓪, 𐓟 𐓡𐓪𐓷𐓘͘𐓧𐓟 𐓟𐓸𐓪͘-𐓘𐓻𐓣͘𐓧𐓟 𐓻𐓘𐓻𐓟, 𐓘͘𐓯𐓣 𐓩𐓣-𐓯𐓪͘𐓯𐓪͘𐓟 𐓰𐓘͘𐓴𐓣𐓪. |

Note: Some vowels in Washashe wageress pahvgreh tse were not standard and thus rather hard to find in unicode. The above sample has those letters (round ʋ, a with top swash, i̱, o̱) changed to their IPA equivalents: (ɔ, ʌ, ĩ, õ)

=== Mandan ===
"Hymns and scripture selections in the Mandan language" was published in 1905 by Berthold Mission.

=== Stoney Nakoda ===
Lazarus Wesley translated Mark into Stoney Nakoda in the 1970s. Quentin Lefthand, assisted by Virginia Wesley, Allie Lefthand, Clarence Lefthand, Mary Kaquitts, Yvonne Lefthand and other members of the Stoney community (along with Wycliffe consultant Rob Taylor) translated Luke, Acts, Genesis, James and Revelation into Stoney Nakoda between 2007 and Quentin's death in 2011. Luke was published in DVD format in 2009 and Acts followed in 2012. It is expected that Genesis will be published in 2015 and Revelation in 2016.

== Yuman family ==
=== Havasupai-Walapai-Yavapai ===
Scott and Lynanne Palmer, of Wycliffe Bible Translators, are working on translating the Bible into the Havasupai language. Luke was published in the 1980s, and at least 86% of the rest of the New Testament and Genesis has been drafted.

== Wakashan family ==
=== Nuu-chah-nulth/Nootka ===
Melvin Swartout's 1899 "Shorter catechism and hymnal" included a few selections from the Bible, specifically the ten commandments, the Lord's prayer, Matt 5:3-10 (the Beatitudes), John 14, 1 Timothy 1:16, John 3:16, and John 11:25, 26.

| Translation | John 3:16 |
|---|---|
| Swartout 1899 | O-nutl-û-nĭtc H. H. ĭh ya-ûk-ûp-ûtl o-kwĭlh hĭs-tcûk’-mĭlh-kŭn‘, hĭn-i-ûtl a něs-ûk dat-na, ûh-a-ûtl yûk‘-yûk-tsĭnı-wu-si ya-ût-ĭtk ta-kak-ût wĭkaktl kah-cĭtl, tĭtc-aktl-ka sa-tcĭn-ĭk. |

=== Kwak'wala/Kwakiutl ===
Alfred James Hall, working together with William Brotchie translated portions of the Bible into the Kwak'wala language. Matthew was published in 1882 by the British and Foreign Bible Society. John was published in 1884, Luke in 1894, Acts in 1897 and Mark in 1900. All were published by the British and Foreign Bible Society. The Kwakwala Bible Portions are now online.

| Translation | John 3:16 |
|---|---|
| BFBS 1884 | Kā God tāḵs aula ā tlāhwila nūq sa awīnāgwīsīḵ, lā gītl tsī zaw sīs hīgāmā Kwanūq, kā kīsīkl tsī tlil klī da ūqis klā kī, lā glākl hīmunīs qīlākl. |

== Language Isolates ==
=== Haida ===
Missionaries from the Anglican Church Mission Society (CMS) arrived amongst the Haida people in 1876. These missionaries initially worked in the Haida language of Alaska. They wrote it down using the Latin script with macrons over the vowels.

The first portion of the Bible in Haida, 500 copies of Matthew, became available in 1891. It was translated by Charles Harrison (missionary), a Church Missionary Society missionary at Masset. Harrison was sent out in 1882, and returned to England in 1891, being succeeded by the Rev. John Henry Keen. Harrison also published a book entitled "Old Testament Stories in the Haida language", this was published after he had already returned to England, in 1893. In 1897 Keen's version of the Acts was published: till then Matthew was the only printed book in the language. Keen also prepared Luke, John, 1 Corinthians, Psalms, and parts of Genesis. (see account of his method of translation, Report of the British and Foreign Bible Society, 1898, p. 317); Luke and John were published in 1899. It is unclear what happened to Keen's manuscripts for Genesis, Psalms, and 1 Corinthians, as they were never published.

| Translation | John 3:16 |
|---|---|
| Keen (BFBS 1899) | Shanung-itlagadas hēt-tligai kwoyādagun alth, Gitang swonshuns tla ga il isdagun, la nung yetdasdlu gum il gū-uns gien, il hēnung-a-swonung-ai una. |

=== Keres ===
John Menaul translated Exodus 20 (the ten commandments) and Matthew 5 (The sermon on the mount) into Keres. It was published in 1883 at the Laguna Mission Press.

Portions of the Bible were translated into Eastern Keres in the 1930s by H. Carroll Whitener. Matthew was published in 1933 and John was published in 1935 and Acts in 1936. Portions into Western Keres were translated from the 1960s with the first full book being completed in 1997.

| Translation | John 3:16 |
|---|---|
| Whitener 1935 | She emi taa Iusi gaishibishra tinye-tyu, hemaku nowe ishike iatrakunishi ga-mutyi hau tyikuya, emi heya sai heme gaapishra tsiuhimatyishi tsatsi tu naaitrakunu, etyu tsiyakamitsi iani naaku. |

=== Seri ===
Edward W. Moser - American Evangelical, into the Seri language of Mexico.

| Translation | John 3:16 |
|---|---|
| | Tiix ihiisax com cöcacaaatj zo haquix piihx ihiisax com hant quih quicoopol com contsamaha. Iquiisax quih cmaa quiih quih hacx immiih taax cösiisaxaha Yooz quij cöpoofpx. |

=== Zuni ===
In 1906, Andrew VanderWagen, with the help of Nich Tumaka, translated Mark and perhaps other portions into the Zuni language of western New Mexico and eastern Arizona. In the 1930s and 1940s, George Yff and Rex Natewa, with the help of Wycliffe Bible Translator H. Carroll Whitener translated Matthew and John. These translations had many problems, including the fact that they used grammatical sentence structure based on English instead of on Zuni.

After extensive study of the Zuni language, and massive recordings of their folklore, and after creating a writing system that worked for their language, Curtis Cook translated the gospel of Mark (published in 1970), John (published 2011) and Acts (in 1978) into the Zuni language. Cook's chief language helper was Lorenzo Chavez

Luke and Genesis have been translated by Wycliffe translators Bill and Carolyn Murray. They have been released on a media DVD. The Murray's, together with Rose Chapman, Sherry Siutza and Delbert Haloo are currently working on a translation of Galatians.

| Translation | John 3:16 |
|---|---|
| Cook 2011 | Ho’n a:wan Datchu God le:wi’ demł a:ho’i lił ulohnannan a:de’on a:wichem’anan akkya yam dobinde Tsawak illona lukno dinakwin iyk’yanan, ya’kya. Akkya dens chuwan hoł aniłdemana:wona kwa’ a:wan binna: a:wotdishukwa. Isha’małde dek’ohannan chimon illa:wa. |

=== External links ===
- Zuni Bible Online

== Pidgins/Creoles ==
=== Chinook Jargon ===
The gospel of Mark was translated into Chinook Jargon and published in 1912.
