= Stefan Bachmann =

Swiss-American author

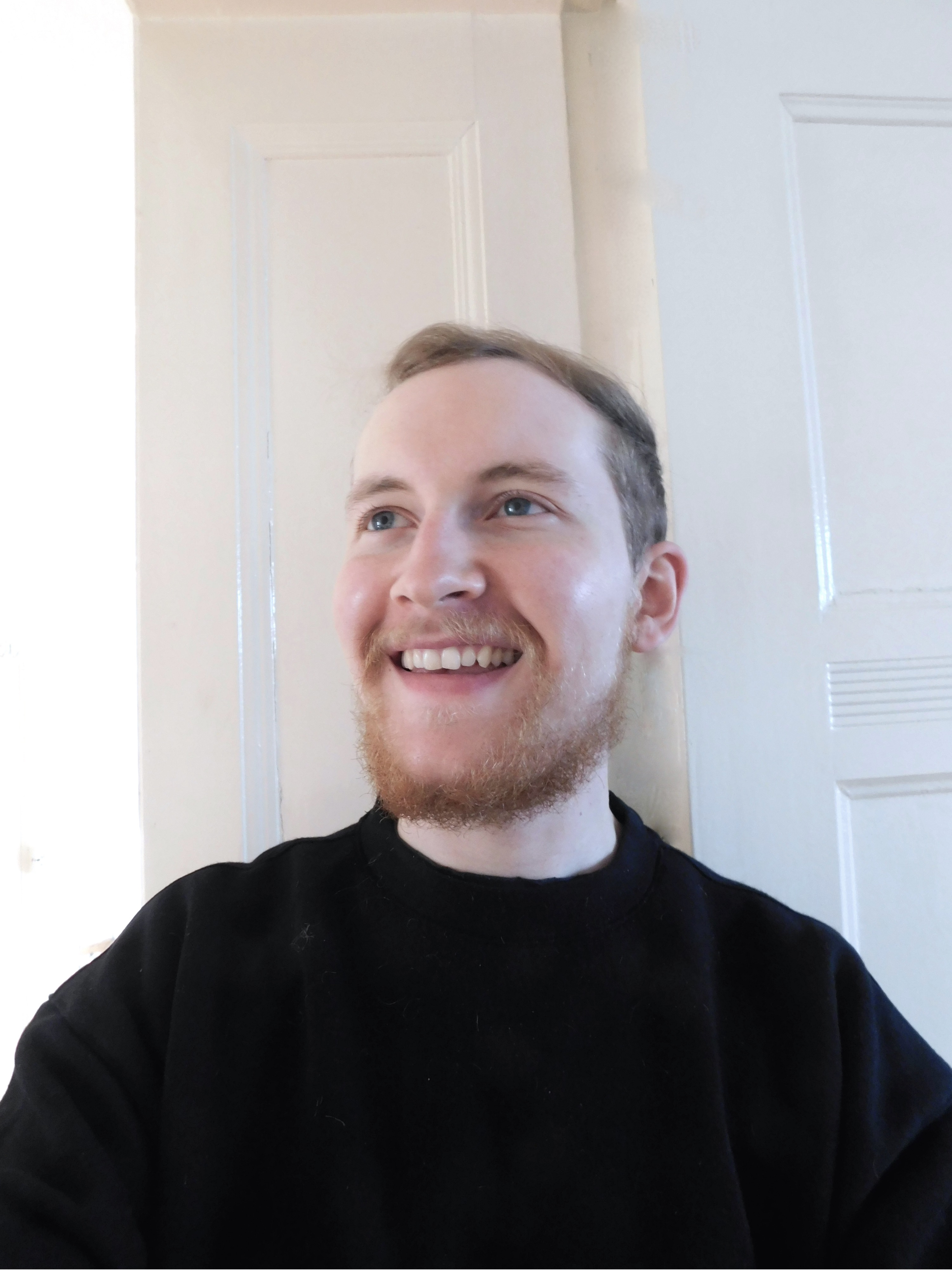
- Born: June 7, 1993 (age 33); Colorado, U.S.
- Education: Zurich University of the Arts
- Occupation: Author
- Writing career
- Language: English, German
- Genres: Children's literature; Fantasy; Historical Fiction; Non-fiction; Gothic Fiction
- Notable awards: Publishers Weekly Best Books of the Year, 2012, Dorothy Canfield Fisher Award Finalist 2022
- Website: stefanbachmann.com

Stefan Bachmann is a Swiss–American author of children's literature, non-fiction, and short stories, as well as a composer and artist. He is best known for his children's novels, including his debut, The Peculiar, a gothic alternate history novel published by HarperCollins.

== Life and career ==
Bachmann was born in Colorado in the United States, and grew up in Zürich, Switzerland. At age 11 he began studying classical music at the Zürich Conservatory, where he studied piano under the tutelage of Carl Rütti. As a teenager, he competed in musical competitions, winning national awards for his compositions and performances. He later studied theory and composition at the Zürich University of the Arts, and lived in Berlin, Prague, and Tokyo.

After university, he completed his obligatory military service, undergoing basic training in Bülach, before working as an officer's aid in various locations across Switzerland.

As of 2022, he serves as a board member and co-president of Autillus, the Swiss Association of Children's Authors and Illustrators. He currently teaches creative writing at the Junges Literaturlabor in Zürich.

Together with Jyoti Guptara, he is the co-founder of "Storytelling Schweiz", a national literacy and communication outreach program and competition that launched in 2023. As of 2023, he also serves as a member of the board of the Leopold Bachmann Foundation.

== Writing ==
Bachmann's debut novel, The Peculiar, was bought by HarperCollins in a bidding war when he was eighteen years old. It was followed by a sequel, The Whatnot. Further books include the short story collection The Cabinet of Curiosities: 36 Tales Brief and Sinister, young adult novel A Drop of Night, and children's fantasy Cinders & Sparrows, all published by HarperCollins in the United States.

== Reception ==
His books have received critical acclaim from The New York Times, Publishers Weekly, Kirkus, and many others. His writing has been noted for its vivid use of language, as well as often dark subject matter. In 2012, he was chosen as one of Huffington Post's "18 Under 18" alongside Malala Yousafzai and Tavi Gavinson. In 2017, he was chosen for the Aarhus 39, a selection of the best writers under the age of 40 in Europe, presented at the International Hay Festival in Denmark. His writing has been published in fifteen countries.

== Awards ==
Work	Award	Result	Ref.
The Peculiar	Publishers Weekly Best Books of the Year	Selection	
The Peculiar	New York Times Editor's Choice	Selection	
The Peculiar	Cybils Award	Nominee	
The Peculiar	Publishers Weekly Flying Start	Selection	
The Peculiar	Top Ten – IndieBound Indie Next List	Selection	
The Peculiar	ABA Best New Voices	Selection	
The Cabinet of Curiosities: 36 Tales Brief and Sinister	Junior Library Guild selection	Selection	
The Cabinet of Curiosities: 36 Tales Brief and Sinister	Bank Street Best Books of the Year	Selection	
The Cabinet of Curiosities: 36 Tales Brief and Sinister	New York Public Library’s 100 Titles for Reading and Sharing	Selection	
Cinders and Sparrows	Junior Library Guild selection	Selection	
Cinders and Sparrows	Bank Street Best Books of the Year	Selection	
Cinders and Sparrows	Dorothy Canfield Fisher Award	Nominee	
Cinders and Sparrows	Rattenfänger-Literaturpreis	Nominee	
Cinders and Sparrows	IndieBound Indie Next Pick	Selection	

== Bibliography ==
=== Children's books ===
- The Peculiar (Greenwillow Books/HarperCollins, 2012)
- The Whatnot (Greenwillow Books/HarperCollins, 2013)
- Cinders and Sparrows (Greenwillow Books/HarperCollins, 2020)

=== Young adult ===
- A Drop of Night (Greenwillow Books/HarperCollins, 2016)
- Release the Wolves (forthcoming from Greenwillow Books/HarperCollins, 2024)

=== Nonfiction ===
- The Secret Life of Hidden Places (Workman, 2024), in collaboration with April Genevieve Tucholke

=== Anthologies ===
- The Cabinet of Curiosities: 36 Tales Brief & Sinister (Greenwillow Books/HarperCollins, 2014) — in collaboration with Claire Legrand, Katherine Catmull, and Emma Trevayne; illustrated by Alexander Jansson
- Slasher Girls & Monster Boys (Dial, 2015) — short story collection edited by April Genevieve Tucholke, with stories by Bachmann, Marie Lu, Leigh Bradugo, Jay Kristoff, etc.
- Quest: Stories of Journeys from Around Europe (Alma Books, 2017) — edited by Daniel Hahn, with stories by Bachmann, Katherine Rundell, Maria Turtschaninoff, etc.
- The Dagon Collection (PS Publishing, 2024) — edited by Nate Pedersen, with entries by Bachmann, Jesse Bullington, Sylvia Moreno-Garcia, etc.
