= The Boneless Mercies =

2018 novel by April Genevieve Tucholke

- Author: April Genevieve Tucholke
- Language: English
- Publisher: Farrar, Straus & Giroux
- Publication date: October 2, 2018
- Publication place: USA
- Media type: Print (Hardback), Audiobook
- Pages: 352
- ISBN: 9780374307066

The Boneless Mercies is a young adult fantasy novel written by April Genevieve Tucholke and published on October 2, 2018 Farrar, Straus & Giroux, an imprint of Macmillan. The book is a genderbent retelling of Beowulf, with young female warriors hunting down a mythic beast.

== Plot ==
Frey, Ovie, Juniper, and Runa are the Boneless Mercies—girls hired to kill quickly, quietly, and mercifully. But Frey is weary of the death trade and, having been raised on the heroic sagas of her people, dreams of a bigger life.

When she hears of an unstoppable monster ravaging a nearby town, Frey decides this is the Mercies' one chance out. The fame and fortune of bringing down such a beast would ensure a new future for all the Mercies. In fact, her actions may change the story arc of women everywhere.

== Characters ==
- Frey
- Ovie
- Juniper
- Runa
- Trigve

== Reception ==
The critical reception for the book has been very positive. Publishers Weekly named the book a best book of 2018. The Kirkus reviewer wrote "These fierce, honorable adolescent female warriors hold their own and break all the rules. Wow." Publishers Weekly said of the book, "Tucholke injects close intimacy into her lush saga, interweaving love and murder, mercy and glory into her portrayal of life and death. It is a beautiful, haunting modern-day epic that stars a bold and resourceful sisterhood of heroines unafraid to claim agency." School Library Journal wrote of the novel, "Frey embodies the pursuit of glory through a quest to become a hero remembered in story and myth. Fans of The Hobbit and The Lord of the Rings will find similar themes and elements. This is a must-have for avid fantasy readers who enjoy action-packed plots."
