= The Peculiar =

Children's fantasy novel from 2012

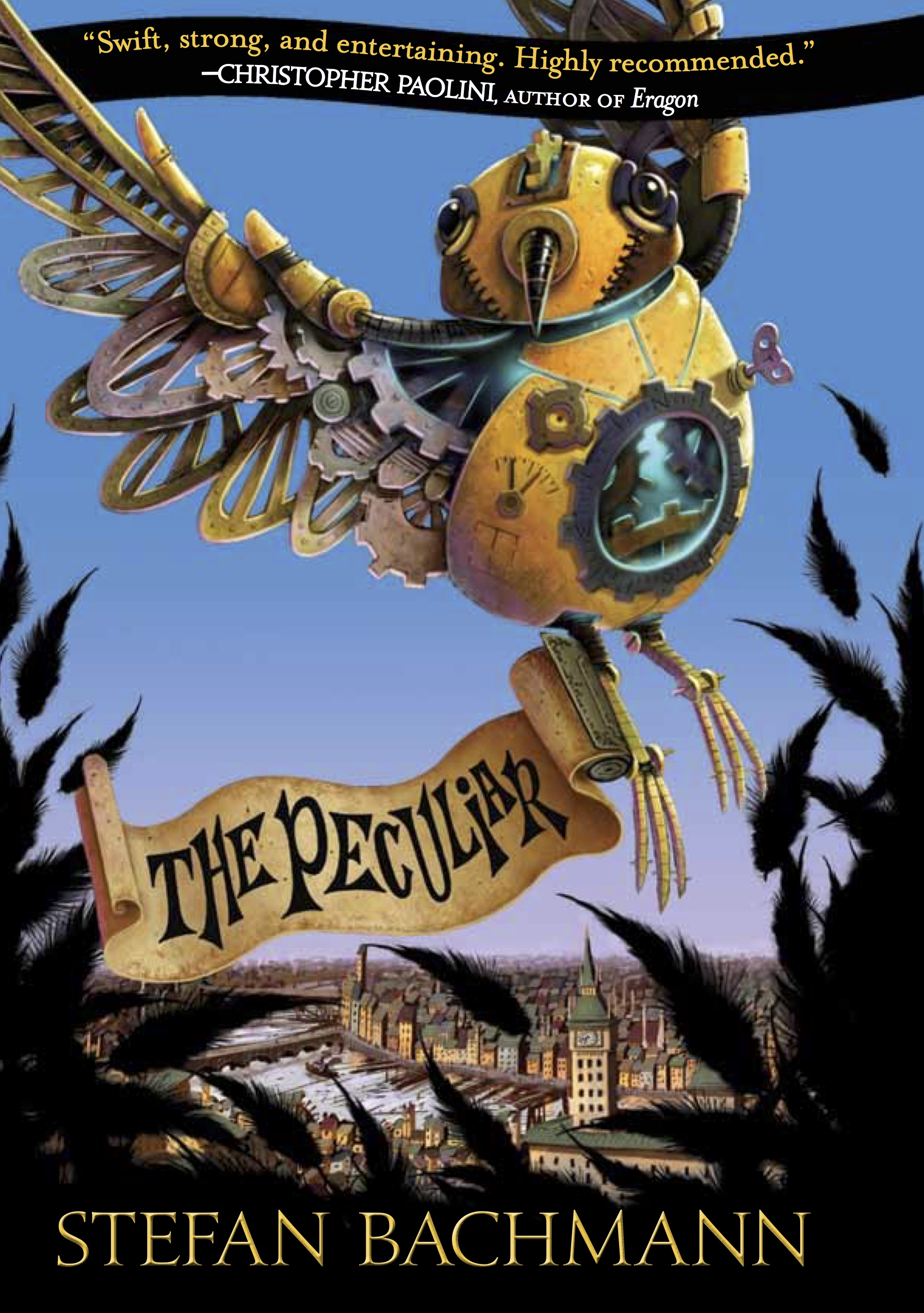
- Author: Stefan Bachmann
- Language: English
- Series: The Peculiar duology
- Genre: Historical fantasy
- Publisher: HarperCollins
- Publication date: September 18th, 2012
- Publication place: United States
- Media type: Print (Hardback), Audiobook
- Pages: 368
- ISBN: 0062245015
- Followed by: The Whanot

The Peculiar is a children's fantasy novel written by Stefan Bachmann and published on September 18, 2012, by Greenwillow Books, an imprint of HarperCollins.

== Synopsis ==
In the faery slums of Bath, Bartholomew and his younger sister Hettie live in fear of discovery by the outside world. Bartholomew and Hettie are changelings, half-faery, half-human, and neither faeries nor humans want anything to do with them. But when changelings start showing up in London murdered and covered with red tattoos, and a mysterious lady in a plum colored dress begins stalking the streets of Bath, Bartholomew breaks all the rules and sets out to discover the truth.

== Characters ==
- Bartholomew Kettle: a young changeling, the protagonist
- Henrietta Kettle: Bartholomew's younger sister
- The Lady in Plum: a woman with a mysterious past
- Arthur Jelliby: a spoiled young government official
- Mr. Lickerish: a sinister faery who has been voted into the government
- Jack Box: a mysterious, malevolent faery who takes the form of a swarm of rats

== Reception ==
Critical reception for the book has been positive, and the book met with acclaim. The New York Times called it "richly-realized and accomplished" in its review, and it was an Editor's Choice. Los Angeles Times said, "Bachmann’s steampunk fairy tale . . . recalls Dostoevsky, Dickens, and more recent classics, such as J. K. Rowling’s Harry Potter and Lemony Snicket’s A Series of Unfortunate Events . . . [An] unusually gifted young writer.” Fantasy authors Christopher Paolini and Rick Riordan praised the book, with Paolini saying, “Bachmann’s prose is beautiful, and his story is swift, strong, and entertaining." In a starred review, Publishers Weekly called it “An absolute treat for readers of any age" and chose it as one of their best books of 2012. It was nominated for the Cybils Award, and was an ABA New Voices Pick.
