= Between the Devil and the Deep Blue Sea (novel) =

2013 novel by April Genevieve Tucholke

- Author: April Genevieve Tucholke
- Language: English
- Series: Between the Devil and the Deep Blue Sea #1
- Genre: Gothic horror, young adult
- Publisher: The Dial Press
- Publication date: August 15, 2013
- Publication place: United States
- Media type: Print (hardcover), audiobook
- Pages: 360 pp.
- ISBN: 9780803738898
- Followed by: Between the Spark and the Burn

Between the Devil and the Deep Blue Sea is a young adult gothic horror novel written by American author April Genevieve Tucholke and published on August 15, 2013 by Dial Books for Young Readers, an imprint of Penguin Books. A follow up that concludes the narrative, Between the Spark and the Burn, was released in 2014.

== Synopsis ==
After a boy named River West moves into the guesthouse behind her estate, Violet White grows curious of him, his past, and his potential connection to strange happenings in the seaside town where she resides. Violet contends with her feelings for and budding relationship with River, who she fears may be the "Devil" that her grandmother once warned her of.

== Characters ==
- Violet White: teenage girl, protagonist and narrator
- River Redding: teenage boy with a mysterious past
- Luke White: Violet's brother, artist
- Sunshine Black: Violet's best friend
- Neely Redding: River's brother
- Freddie White: Violet's dead grandmother
- Brodie Redding: Neely and River's half little brother and antagonist
- Jack: a young boy who lives in echo and is distantly related to the Whites

== Reception ==
The book's reception has been generally positive, including starred reviews from School Library Journal, VOYA, and Booklist. Serra of School Library Journal wrote, "Tucholke's gothic tone, plot, and setting, complete with a deteriorating estate full of dark family secrets, is reminiscent of Daphne du Maurier or YA fare such as Kami Garcia's and Margaret Stohl's Beautiful Creatures." Booklist said of the book, "Tucholke paints this moody, gothic romance with a languid brush. Moments of horror nestle against warm, dreamy kisses." Publishers Weekly wrote of the novel, "Tucholke luxuriates in the details of small-town life, including her characters' gourmand tendencies and their quick-witted interactions, in a chilling supernatural exploration of free will and reality's fluidity."

Between the Devil and the Deep Blue Sea was nominated by YALSA for a Teens Top Ten Award for books published in 2013. The book was also a 2015 Kentucky Blue Grass Award nominee, an Honorable Mention in the Westchester Fiction Awards, and a runner up in the 2013 YABC Choice Awards' Best Teen Horror/Thriller category.
