= Lisa Brown (artist) =

American illustrator and writer

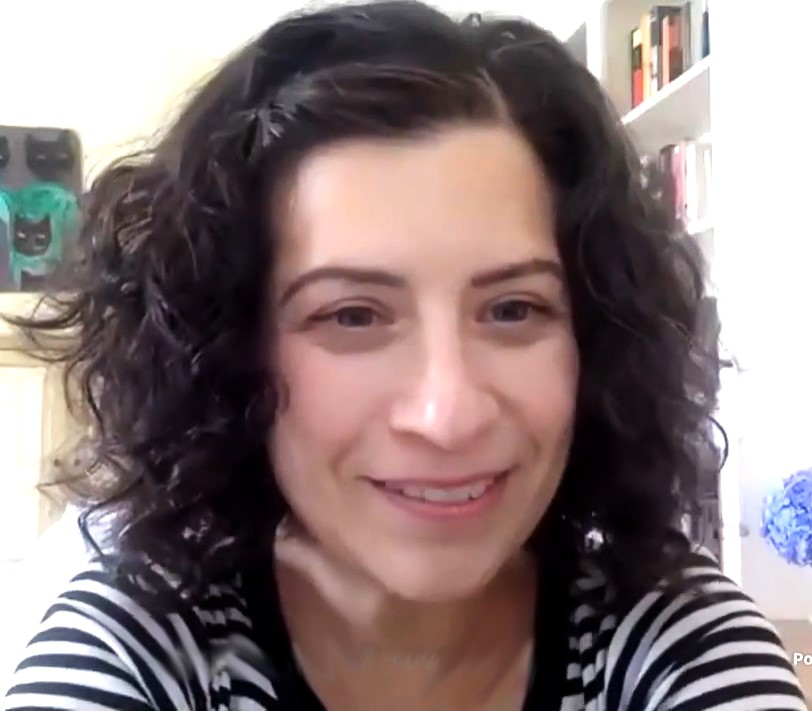
- Brown in 2011
- Born: January 12, 1972 (age 54)
- Education: Wesleyan University (BA); Pratt Institute (MS)
- Occupations: Writer; illustrator
- Spouse: Daniel Handler
- Children: 1
- Writing career
- Pen name: Sarah "Pinkie" Bennett

Lisa Michelle Brown (born January 12, 1972) is an American illustrator and writer whose books include Picture the Dead, How To Be, The Latke Who Couldn’t Stop Screaming, and Baby, Mix Me A Drink. She draws the Three Panel Book Review cartoon for the book section of the San Francisco Chronicle. She graduated with a BA from Wesleyan University in Middletown, Connecticut in 1993, and an MS in Communications Design from the Pratt Institute in Brooklyn, New York in 1998. She lives in San Francisco with her child and her husband, Daniel Handler.

Brown has used the pseudonym Sarah "Pinkie" Bennett, at least for illustration.

== Recent projects ==
Vampire Boy's Good Night is a picture book about a small vampire boy and a little witch. On a cold autumn night, they head out in search of ″real children.″

Picture the Dead is a traditional ghost story with a visual twist. Co-written with Adele Griffin, the visual clues allow the reader to unravel the mystery in step with (or ahead of) the narrator. It's not a graphic novel and not an illustrated chapter book, but a novel in which the illustrations are an integral part of the whole. It's a book about dealing with the visual clues, but at the same time infused with the more traditional narrative around each image. The illustrations are based on old daguerreotypes and albumen prints of anonymous sitters, culled from the Online Prints and Photographs Reading Room of the Library of Congress. The background patterns are based on actual Victorian designs.

The book is set in Brookline, Massachusetts during the American Civil War. Haunted by the recent deaths of her twin brother and fiancé, seventeen-year-old Jennie Lovell forges an unlikely friendship with a Spiritualist photographer who helps her to expose tragic family secrets.

== Prizes and honors ==
- CCBC CHOICES 2007: New (c2006) Books for Children and Young Adults Recommended by the Cooperative Children's Book Center (CCBC) School of Education, University of Wisconsin Madison (for 'How to Be, HarperCollins 2006)
- A Baker’s Dozen: The Best Children’s Books for Family Literacy 2007, presented by The Pennsylvania Center for the Book, PennState University, (for How to Be, HarperCollins 2006)
- The Association of Booksellers for Children (ABC) Best Books for Children 2006 (for How to Be, HarperCollins 2006)
- American Illustration Annuals 25 and 26, artwork chosen for display on the web
- Print Regional Design Annual 2006 for the book cover design of How to Dress for Every Occasion by The Pope
- Print Regional Design Annual 2007 for book cover designs of Baby Do My Banking and Baby Fix My Car, McSweeney's 2006
- AIGA 50 Covers / 50 Books 2007 for book cover design of The Latke Who Couldn't Stop Screaming

== Select titles ==
- The Phantom Twin (2020 - author & illustrator)
- Goldfish Ghost (2017 - illustrator)
- The Airport Book (2015 - author & illustrator)
- Emily's Blue Period (2014 - illustrator)
- Half-Minute Horrors (2009 - author & illustrator, contributor)
- Baby Plan My Wedding (2009 - author, illustrator & designer)
- Baby Get Me Some Lovin (2009 - author, illustrator & designer)
- Sometimes You Get What You Want (2008 – illustrator)
- The Latke Who Couldn't Stop Screaming (2007 - illustrator & designer)
- How to Be (2006 - author & illustrator)
- Baby, Do My Banking (2006 - author, illustrator & designer)
- Baby, Fix My Car (2006 - author, illustrator & designer)
- How to Dress For Every Occasion By The Pope (2005 - illustrator, as Sarah "Pinkie" Bennett, and designer)
- Baby Mix Me a Drink (2005 - author, illustrator & designer)
- Baby Make Me Breakfast (2005 - author, illustrator & designer)
- Outrageous Women of Colonial America (2001 – illustrator)
- Outrageous Women of the Renaissance (1999 – illustrator)
- Outrageous Women of the Middle Ages (1998 – illustrator)
- Outrageous Women of Ancient Times (1998 – illustrator)

== Bibliography ==
- December 9, 2005, The Seattle Times, about the “Baby Be of Use” series
- March 27, 2006, National Post (Canada) about How to Dress for Every Occasion by The Pope
- June 28, 2006: “Holder Tonight” radio show on CJAD Montreal, talking about the “Baby Be of Use” series
- July 3, 2006, Green Bay Press-Gazette, about How to Be
- August 10, 2006, NY Post, about the “Baby Be of Use” series
- August 11, 2006: “Bulldog and the Rude Awakening” radio show WOCM 98.1 FM, talking about the “Baby Be of Use” series
- West Coast Live radio program, December 2, 2006, Oakland, CA, talking with Sedge Thompson about How to Be and the “Baby Be of Use” books, and 2007 talking about The Latke Who Couldn't Stop Screaming, with Daniel Handler
- Child Magazine, March 2007, about fostering creativity
- November 15, 2007, Publishers Weekly, about The Latke Who Couldn't Stop Screaming
- December 18, 2008, CBC Radio Montreal, weekly morning show, about Hanukah and The Latke Who Couldn't Stop Screaming
