= Between the Spark and the Burn =

2014 novel by April Genevieve Tucholke

- Author: April Genevieve Tucholke
- Language: English
- Publisher: Dial
- Publication date: August 14, 2014
- Publication place: USA
- Media type: Print (Hardback)
- Pages: 320
- ISBN: 0803740476
- Preceded by: Between the Devil and the Deep Blue Sea

Between the Spark and the Burn is a young adult gothic horror novel written by American author April Genevieve Tucholke and published on August 14, 2014 by Dial Books for Young Readers, an imprint of Penguin Books. It is a sequel to Between the Devil and the Deep Blue Sea, which was published in 2013.

== Plot ==
Last summer the Redding brothers – River, Neely, and Brodie – descended upon Violet White's (Vi's) dreamy seaside town, bringing chaos.

Then Brodie and River disappeared.

Now a rattling unease fills Vi.

So when she catches a late-night radio show whispering of eerie events in a distant mountain village, she seizes on it, since this could be River or Brodie. Vi and Neely's search takes them to frenzied mountain towns, cursed islands, and an empty, snow-muffled hotel. They find a girl who's seen the devil, a sea captain's daughter, and a sweet, red-haired forest boy who meets death halfway. All the while, Vi's feelings for Neely grow sharper, the stakes higher, and the truth harder to pin down. If only Violet knew that while she's been hunting the Redding boys... someone's been hunting her.

== Characters ==
- Violet ("Vi") White: teenage girl, protagonist and narrator
- River Redding: teenage boy with mysterious powers and a mysterious past
- Luke White: Violet's brother, artist
- Sunshine Black: Violet's best friend
- Neely Redding: River's brother
- Brodie Redding: The third Redding brother
- Freddie White: Violet's dead grandmother
- Cassie Black: Sunshine's Mother
- Sam Black: Sunshine's Father
- Will Redding: The Grandfather of River, Neely, & Brodie. Also had the glow but called it the burn. He relations with Violet's grandmother, Freddie.
- Chase Glenship: Lived at Glenship Manor. The boy Will Redding had wanted Freddie to marry. The eldest son who killed a girl in the Glenship cellar.
- Rose Redding: Will's Sister. River & Neely's great aunt. Killed when she was 16 by Chase Glenship.

== Reception ==
The critical reception for the book has been positive. The School Library Journal reviewer wrote "The lush and polished prose, eerie locales, and pervading sense of dark unease are as engrossing as they were in the first installment." The staff concluded, "[like with] Between the Devil and the Deep Blue Sea, this macabre sequel's melancholy, ornate prose almost overshadows its intriguing plot." Kirkus Reviews said of the book, "Violet is both intuitive and naïve, capable of profound revelation . . . The faded opulence of the setting is an ideal backdrop for this lushly atmospheric gothic thriller, which, happily, comes with a satisfying conclusion. Darkly romantic and evocative."
