= Wink Poppy Midnight =

2016 young adult mystery novel by April Genevieve Tucholke

- Author: April Genevieve Tucholke
- Language: English
- Publisher: The Dial Press
- Publication date: March 22, 2016
- Publication place: United States
- Media type: Print (hardcover), audiobook
- Pages: 256
- ISBN: 9780803740488

Wink Poppy Midnight is a young adult mystery novel written by April Genevieve Tucholke and published on March 22, 2016 by Dial Books for Young Readers, an imprint of Penguin Books.

== Plot ==
This young adult novel is told in three distinct voices: Wink, Poppy, and Midnight. One is a hero, one is a villain, and one is a liar, but the reader is never sure which is which. Wink has red hair, green eyes and freckles. Poppy is a bully with blonde hair and grey eyes, who is very manipulative. Midnight is a boy caught between the two of them. Everyone has a secret.

== Characters ==
- Wink Bell: teenage girl, lives with extended family and many animals in the countryside. One of three voices in the book. She has long curly ginger hair, big innocent green eyes and freckles.
- Midnight Hunt: A teenage boy, Wink's new neighbor. One of three voices in the book. He had black hair.
- Poppy: A teenage girl, bully. One of three voices in the book. She has blonde hair, pale skin and grey eyes. She's the only daughter of two famous doctors.
- Leaf Bell: The older of the Bell's siblings. He's the brother of Wink. He has straight dark red hair. He's described like someone silent, mysterious, distant.

== Reception ==
The critical reception for the book has been very positive, including a starred review from Kirkus Reviews. The Kirkus reviewer wrote "Nicely constructed and planned, with unexpected twists to intrigue and entertain." Publishers Weekly said of the book, "A dark, unpredictable mystery that ... shimmer[s] with sumptuous descriptions and complicated psychologies." School Library Journal wrote of the novel, "Tucholke showcases her talent for storytelling once again ... Unique characterization turns archetypes inside out ... This title will keep readers on their toes".
