= Emma Trevayne =

British speculative fiction author

- Occupation: Author
- Writing career
- Genres: Cyberpunk, fantasy, science fiction, steampunk
- Website: www.emmatrevayne.wordpress.com

Emma Trevayne is a British (expatriate American) speculative fiction author.

== Novels ==
Trevayne's debut novel Coda released in May 2013. A young adult cyberpunk novel, the narrative follows Anthem, an eighteen-year-old boy who lives in a world where music is a drug dispensed by the Corp. Anthem plays a two-faced role within the society. He's a conduit - feeding the power grid by hooking and being drained daily - and he's a rebel - playing music in a tucked away spot with home made instruments against the Corps' mandates. The follow-up is set to release in May 2014, and takes up the narrative eight years after Coda, following Anthem's younger sister, Alpha.

In May 2014, Trevayne's middle grade Victorian fantasy novel Flights and Chimes and Mysterious Times is due to release from Simon & Schuster Books for Young readers. The story centers around a ten-year-old boy named Jack Foster and his adventure through Londinium, "a quite different London."

Trevayne is a co-author of The Cabinet of Curiosities: 36 Tales Brief & Sinister, also due to release in May 2014. Billed as "a collection of eerie, mysterious, intriguing, and very short short stories," the book is a collaboration with fellow children's book authors Stefan Bachmann, Katherine Catmull, and Claire Legrand.

== Representation ==
In 2014, Trevayne was represented by Brooks Sherman of the Bent Agency.

== Bibliography ==
=== Coda Series ===
- Coda (2013) USA, Running Press Kids
- Chorus (2014) USA Running Press Kids

=== The Nova Project ===
- Gamescape: Overworld (2016) Greenwillow Books

=== Other ===
- Flights and Chimes and Mysterious Times (2014) Simon & Schuster
- The Accidental Afterlife of Thomas Marsden (2015) Simon & Schuster
- The House of Months and Years (2017) Simon & Schuster
- Spindrift and the Orchid (2019) Simon & Schuster

=== Collaborations ===
With Stefan Bachmann, Katherine Catmull, Claire Legrand, and Alexander Jansson

- The Cabinet of Curiosities: 36 Tales Brief and Sinister (2014) Greenwillow Books
