= April Genevieve Tucholke =

American author

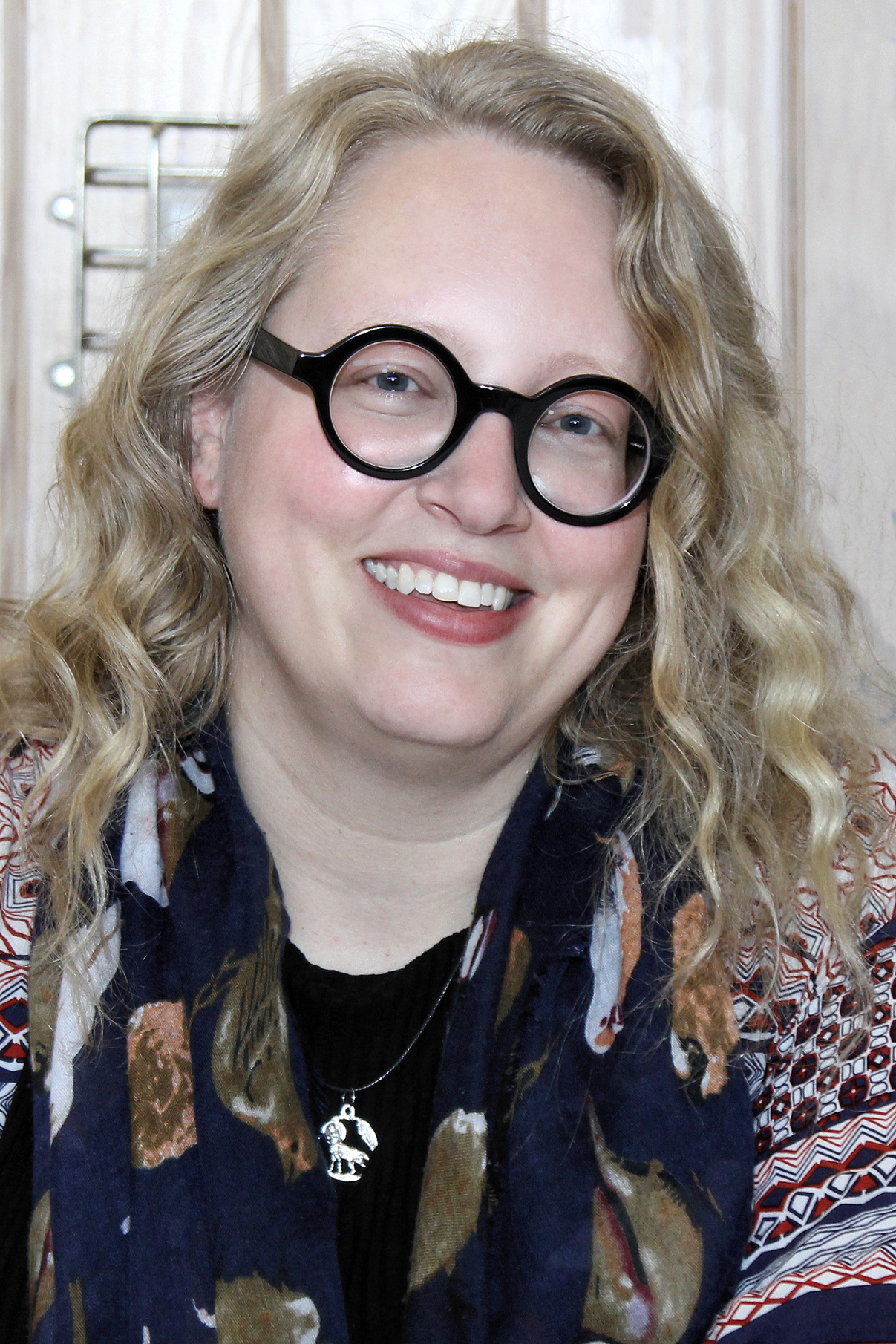
- Occupation: Writer
- Writing career
- Period: 2013–present
- Genres: Young adult and Gothic and Mystery and Fantasy and Picture books
- Notable works: Between the Devil and the Deep Blue Sea; Between the Spark and the Burn; Wink Poppy Midnight; The Boneless Mercies
- Notable awards: YALSA Top 10 Teens Choice, Publishers Weekly Best Books of 2018
- Website: apriltucholke.com

April Genevieve Tucholke (/təˈhɒlki/ tə-HOLL-kee) is an American author based in Georgia. She is best known for her Gothic horror novel Between the Devil and the Deep Blue Sea and its sequel Between the Spark and the Burn, as well as a dark young adult mystery novel Wink Poppy Midnight, all published by Penguin Books.

== Biography ==
Tucholke grew up on a farm in the Midwest and has since lived in a variety of places, including Colorado, North Carolina, Massachusetts, Oregon and Scotland. She currently lives in Savannah, Georgia.

== Career ==
Tucholke was initially represented by Joanna Volpe of New Leaf Literary, who offered representation within 24 hours of receiving the manuscript for Between the Devil and the Deep Blue Sea. The book sold to Penguin's imprint Dial, who purchased the book in a preemptive deal.

Tucholke edited the anthology Slasher Girls & Monster Boys (Penguin, 2015), and her third novel Wink Poppy Midnight was published by Penguin Books in 2016. She contributed to Because You Love to Hate Me, an anthology of short stories written by 13 YA authors who were paired with 13 BookTubers published in July 2017.

The Boneless Mercies, a gender-bent retelling of Beowulf, was published by Farrar, Straus, and Giroux in October, 2018. A companion novel, The Seven Endless Forests, a gender-bent retelling of the King Arthur legend with a Norse twist, was published in 2020.

Tucholke's first picture book, Beatrice Likes the Dark was published in September, 2022 from Algonquin, an imprint of Workman Publishing Company with illustrations by Khoa Lee. A second picture book, Merry and Hark: A Christmas Story with illustrations by Rebecca Santo was published in 2023 also from Algonquin.

Tucholke is now represented by Laura Rennert at Andrea Brown Literary.

== Works ==
=== Between the Devil and the Deep Blue Sea duology ===
1. Between the Devil and the Deep Blue Sea (2013)
2. Between the Spark and the Burn (2014)

=== Standalone ===
- Wink Poppy Midnight (2016)

=== Fantasies ===
- The Boneless Mercies (2018)
- The Seven Endless Forests (2020)

=== Picture books ===
- Beatrice Likes the Dark (2022)
- Merry and Hark: A Christmas Story (2023)

=== Adult Nonfiction ===
- The Secret Life of Hidden Places (2024), in collaboration with Stefan Bachmann

=== Anthologies ===
- Slasher Girls & Monster Boys (Editor and Contributing Writer) (2015)
- Because You Love to Hate Me: 13 Tales of Villainy (Contributing Writer) (2017)

== Book awards ==
=== Between the Devil and the Deep Blue Sea ===
- 2014 Kentucky Blue Grass Award nominee
- 2014 Westchester Fiction Award, Honorable Mention
- 2014 YALSA Teens Top Ten award selection

=== Wink Poppy Midnight ===
- PureWow's Best of Spring
- 2016 Amazon Editors' Best Books of the Month, March
- 2016 Junior Library Guild Selection, Young Adult
- 2016 Mashable's Best Young Adult Books
- 2016 Popcrush's 10 Best Young Adult Books
- 2016 Spring Kids' Indie Next List
- 2016 Teen Vogue's Best New YA Books
- 2017 YALSA Top Ten Amazing Audiobooks for Young Adults

=== The Boneless Mercies ===
- 2018 Publishers Weekly Best Book of 2018
- 2019–2020 Green Mountain Book Award
