= The Latke Who Couldn't Stop Screaming =

Book by Lemony Snicket

- Author: Lemony Snicket (pen name of Daniel Handler)
- Illustrator: Lisa Brown
- Language: English
- Genre: Humor
- Publisher: McSweeney's
- Publication date: October 28, 2007
- Publication place: United States
- Media type: Print

The Latke Who Couldn't Stop Screaming: A Christmas Story is a children's book written by Lemony Snicket and illustrated by Lisa Brown. An irate latke at Hanukkah escapes from being cooked in a hot frying pan. He runs into various Christmas symbols (such as Christmas lights, a candy cane and pine tree) who are all ignorant and uneducated about the customs of Hanukkah. The latke attempts to educate these characters about the history and culture surrounding the Jewish holiday, but his attempts are always in vain and he runs away from each encounter in a fit of frustration.

== Plot summary ==
The story begins in a tiny village, where in a small undecorated cottage, a latke is born. The latke, suffering from its immersion in heated olive oil, begins to scream and jumps out the window. It encounters a string of flashing colored lights, which do not appreciate the latke's shrieks and wonder why it was thrown into a pan of boiling oil. The latke explains that the oil is a reminder of "the oil used to rededicate the temple following the defeat of Antiochus at the hands of the Maccabees". The lights compare the latke to hash browns, and suggest it be served with a Christmas ham. The latke exclaims that it is something completely different, and runs away screaming.

The latke then comes across a candy cane, which expresses distaste at the latke's mouthwatering smell. The latke points out that its smell is a reminder of greater modern religious freedom. In 175 BCE, the latke explains, in order to study the Torah, Hebrews needed to hide in caves, and pretended to play with dreidels when Greek soldiers approached. The candy cane equates this with Joseph and Mary hiding in the manger, but the latke insists that this is a totally different thing, and runs off screaming into the forest.

The latke stops to rest under a pine tree, which asks if the latke is a present. The latke tiredly explains that it is more important to light the candles eight nights in a row, "to commemorate the miracle in the temple and the miracle of victory even when you are thoroughly outnumbered". The tree mentions Santa Claus, and although the latke insists that Christmas and Hannukah are completely different, the tree explains that different things often blend together. The tree begins to tell a funny story about pagan rituals when it is interrupted by a family searching the forest for a holiday necessity. They scoop up the latke and take it home, where it is finally "welcomed into a home full of people who understood what a latke is, and how it fits into this particular holiday". Then they eat it.

== Theatrical adaptation ==
The book was adapted for the stage by Tall Stories Theatre Company, touring from 2012 to 2015.

== See also ==
- Lemony Snicket bibliography
- Website of the theatrical adaptation
