= SD Nelson =

American author

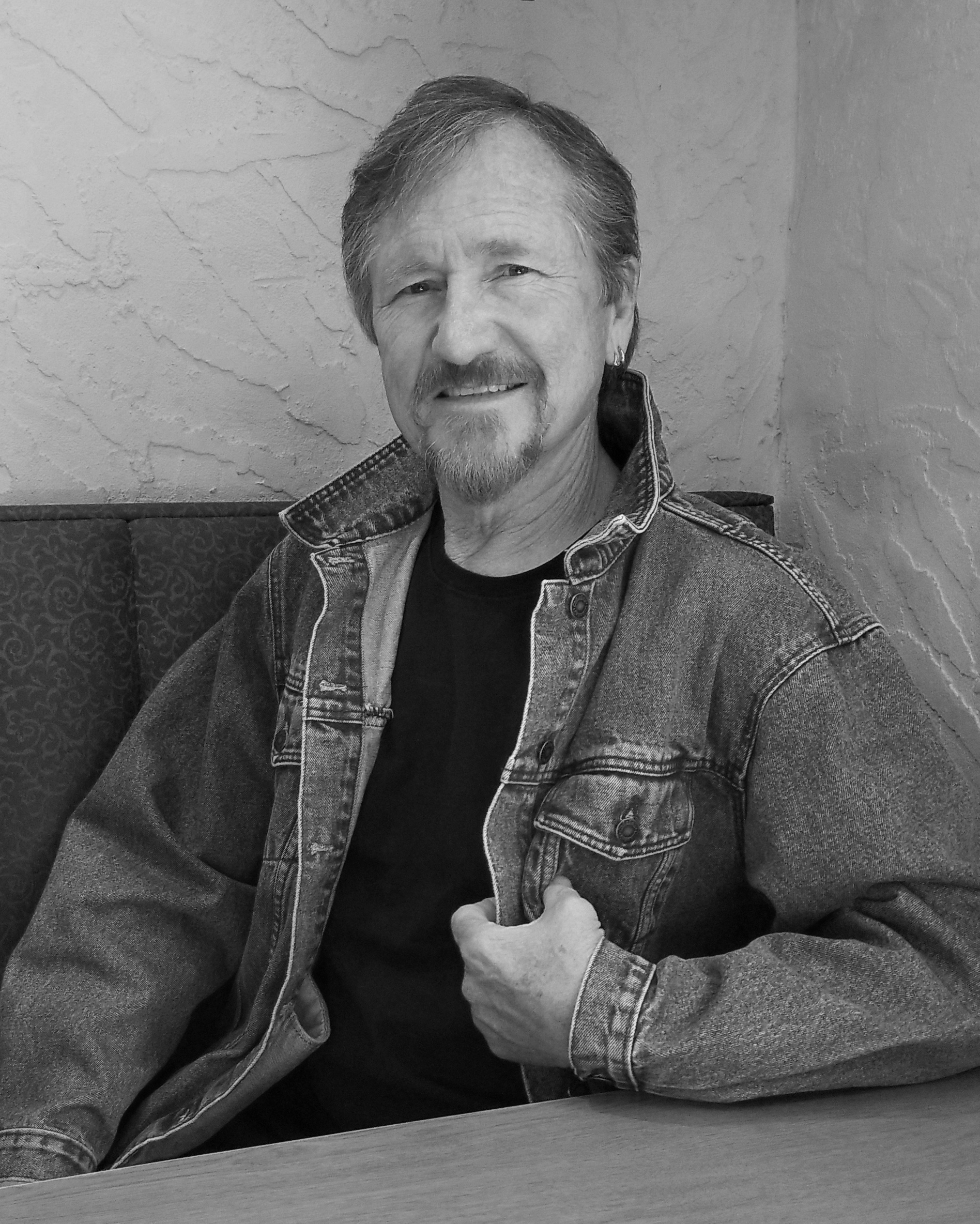
- S.D. Nelson in 2019
- Born: January 25, 1950 (age 76) Fort Knox, Kentucky US
- Education: Minnesota State University Moorhead
- Occupations: Illustrator, writer
- Writing career
- Genre: Children's picture books
- Website: www.sdnelson.net

SD Nelson was born Stephen D. Nelson (born January 25, 1950) at the United States Army Station Hospital in Fort Knox, Kentucky. He is an American illustrator and author of many children's books including Black Elk’s Vision, Gift Horse, The Star People and Buffalo Bird Girl. Nelson's work has been praised as “stirring, inspirational, original and beautifully illustrated”. His books have received the American Indian Library Association – Honor Book Award 2016.; the Spur Award – Western Writers of America 2004, 2006 (Finalist Awards 2005, 2011, 2016); the Notable Book Award – American Library Association 2001, 2011, and the Bluebonnet Master List Award – Texas Library Association 2011.

== Life and career ==
The artist has a diverse ethnic background. He is descended from Norse and American Indian heritage and is an enrolled member of the Standing Rock Sioux Tribe in the Dakotas with ancestry to the Sioux or Lakota people. Nelson's mother, Christine Rose Gipp, a quarter-blood Lakota Indian was bilingual in English and Hunkpapa Lakota language. Because his father, Thurston D. Nelson, was a career Army officer (164th Infantry Regiment, WWII-Guadalcanal, Korea, Germany, Vietnam), SD lived in many different places as a young boy including military bases in Kentucky, Kansas and Germany. His Lakota mother's ties to her home in western North Dakota brought them back to the Standing Rock Sioux Reservation nearly every summer. The Lakota people of the Northern Plains are members of the Sioux, or the three allied tribes: the Lakota, the Dakota and Nakota.

It was on the Dakota prairies that Nelson developed his passion for landscapes, star-filled nights and traditional Lakota imagery—"I remember one particular summer night…cricket song filled my ears. Then, shimmering overhead, the Northern Lights came dancing, pale green at first, then in ethereal robes of red and gold; spiraling ever upward…colors vanishing, only to reappear. Although I was staring directly into the heavens, from the corner of my eye, I saw something. The sacred something that Lakota people believe is within all things. I was only a boy, but I was seeing in a Wakan manner, in a sacred way."

SD graduated from North High School in Fargo, ND (1968—Hall of Fame). He earned his bachelor's degree in art at Minnesota State University at Moorhead in 1972. During his undergraduate studies, Nelson attended talks given by both Russell Means and Dennis Banks who spoke on the American Indian Movement (AIM) and the reclaiming of American Indian heritage. His early influences were the French Impressionists and N.C. Wyeth who was known for his dramatic and realistic illustrations of classic stories and fables.

Nelson taught art in the public schools in Wahpeton, North Dakota (1975–76). In 1976 he moved to Flagstaff, Arizona to teach art at East Flagstaff Junior High (1976–2003), now known as Mount Elden Middle School, there he met Alan Jim, a Navajo medicine man and a Lakota Sun Dancer. Alan Jim and another Lakota Sun Dancer, Dicky Arias, mentored Nelson in the practice of traditional Lakota ways.

The author has lectured at the National Museum of the American Indian in Washington DC and he was the keynote speaker for Read North Dakota 2010 (NDHC). Nelson was chosen as the 1997 feature artist for the Inter-Tribal Ceremonial – Gallup, New Mexico and for the Night Visions exhibition in Flagstaff, Arizona. He is the President of Read at Home (readathome.org), a 501c3 non-profit literacy program for preschool Native American children that currently serves hundreds of children on the Navajo Nation, the Shoshone-Bannock Reservation and the Gila River Indian Community.

The artist paints with acrylics, which he brushes, sponges, splatters and sprays. His paintings offer a contemporary interpretation of traditional Lakota imagery. SD has painted extensively on animal skins and bone. He has crafted traditional rawhide drums, hand-stitched beads on leather and created ledger book drawings. Nelson's fluid style and traditional Native American art combines bold design, color and texture into a visual celebration of life. The artist has two adult daughters and lives in Flagstaff, Arizona.

== Publications ==
=== Written and illustrated by SD Nelson ===
- Gift Horse: A Lakota Story. Harry N. Abrams, 1999. ISBN 0810945843
- The Star People: A Lakota Story. Harry N. Abrams, 2003. ISBN 0810945843
- Quiet Hero: The Ira Hayes Story. Lee & Low Books, 2006. ISBN 1600604277
- Coyote Christmas: A Lakota Story. Harry N. Abrams, 2007. ISBN 0810993678
- Black Elk's Vision: A Lakota Story. Harry N. Abrams, 2010. ISBN 0810983990
- Buffalo Bird Girl: A Hidatsa Story. Abrams, 2012. ISBN 1419703552
- Greet the Dawn: The Lakota Way. South Dakota State Historical Society, 2012. ISBN 9780984504169
- Digging a Hole to Heaven: Coal Miner Boys. Harry N. Abrams, 2014. ISBN 1419707302
- Sitting Bull: Lakota Warrior and Defender of His People. Harry N. Abrams, 2015. ISBN 1419707310
- Red Cloud: A Lakota Story of War and Surrender. Harry N. Abrams, 2017. ISBN 9781683350545

=== Illustrated by SD Nelson ===
- Crazy Horse's Vision by Joseph Bruchac. Lee & Low Books, 2000. ISBN 1584302828
- Jim Thorpe's Bright Path by Joseph Bruchac. Lee & Low Books, 2004. ISBN 1600603408
- The First Americans by Anthony Aveni. Scholastic Books, 2005. ISBN 0439551447
- Dance in a Buffalo Skull by Zitkala-Sa. South Dakota Historical Society Press, 2007. ISBN 0977795527
- Birchbark House by Louise Erdrich. Houghton Mifflin, 2008. ISBN 0786814543
- Walking on Earth and Touching the Sky by Timothy P. McLaughlin. Harry N. Abrams, 2012. ISBN 1419701797

== Reviews ==
- Crazy Horse's Vision – “This makes inspirational reading and affords a glimpse into the heart of a renowned American leader.” – Kirkus Reviews, starred review.
- The Star People: a Lakota story – “An exemplary offering.” – Kirkus Reviews.
- The Star People: a Lakota story – “The art enhances the text…a solid addition to collections.” – The School Librarian.
- Crazy Horse's Vision – “Bruchac’s description of the vision quest is compelling…Nelson’s sweeping vistas…bolster the book’s visionary theme.” – Publishers Weekly.
- Crazy Horse's Vision – “Sioux artist Nelson fills the pages with both action and quiet drama.” – Booklist.

== Awards ==
- Gift Horse: A Lakota Story – Parents’ Choice Award 2000.
- Black Elk's Vision: A Lakota Story – Book of Merit – The Five Owls Review; *Starred Review – Booklist 2010, 2012.
- Black Elk's Vision: A Lakota Story – Texas Bluebonnet Master List Award 2011.
- Black Elk’s Vision: A Lakota Story – American Library Association Notable Book Award 2011.
- Black Elk’s Vision: A Lakota Story – Booklist: Top 10 Religion/Spirituality Books For Children 2011.
- The Star People : a Lakota story – Spur Award – Western Writers of America 2004.
- Sitting Bull: Lakota Warrior and defender of his people – Notable Book for a Global Society – IRA.
- Black Elk's Vision: A Lakota Story – Oppenheim Toy Portfolio Gold Award; Gold Honor – California Reading Association 2010.
- Sitting Bull: Lakota Warrior and defender of his people – Book for a Global Society Award – International Reading Association 2016.
- Dance in a Buffalo Skull – Most Outstanding Children's Book of 2008 — Mom's Choice Awards.
- Dance in a Buffalo Skull – Aesop Accolade – American Folklore Society 2008.
- Jim Thorpe’s Bright Path – Choices – Cooperative Children's Book Center 2011.

== Exhibitions and book signings ==
Night Visions, Coconino Center for the Arts, AZ - 2008, 2010, 2012, 2014, 2017.

2017 South Dakota Festival of Books, South Dakota State University – 2017.

National Museum of the American Indian/Smithsonian Institution, Washington DC – 2006, 2010.

== Notable Mentions ==
Books

- Children's Literature, Briefly – Seventh edition, 2019, pp. 58, 94–95, 99, 178, 180, 196, 239.
- Paul Goble, Storyteller – 2017, pp. xi, 57–58, 93, 179, 185, 192.

Magazine Articles

- We hear you America; The Dakotas – Reader's Digest, July/August 2012, p. 149.
- Native American History comes alive with Award-winning author and illustrator S. D. Nelson – Roundup Magazine, Western Writers of America, February 2018, p. 11.
- Storybook Artistry – Mountain Living Magazine, October 2012, p. 28.

Publications

- Nelson's Gift: Gift Horse – Alumnews – Minnesota State University Moorhead, Winter 2000, p. 18.
- Alumnotes – Alumnews – Minnesota State University Moorhead, Summer 2010, p. 43.

Newspaper Articles

- Nelson, Bryan to speak Thursday at S.D. Art Museum – The Brookings Register, Volume 140, No. 212.
- After a life of illustrating, artist honored as storyteller – The Arizona Republic, Arizona Living, Wednesday, July 7, 2004.
- Local Writers produce gems – Arizona Daily Sun, Sunday, December 23, 2007.
