= Selu: Seeking the Corn-Mother's Wisdom =

1993 book by Marilou Awiakta

- Author: Marilou Awiakta
- Publisher: Fulcrum
- Publication date: 1993
- Publication place: United States
- ISBN: 9781555911447

Selu: Seeking the Corn-Mother's Wisdom is a 1993 book by Marilou Awiakta. It uses poems, essays, and drawings to explore themes of unity and diversity. Awiakta uses the Cherokee story of corn as a "compass-story" to keep readers oriented throughout her lessons.

The book draws on Cherokee storytelling traditions, the Appalachian landscape, and observations of contemporary society to provide "tribal-specific, decolonizing lessons". She also uses the book to explore connections between her claimed Celtic, Scots-Irish, and Cherokee descent. Despite self-identifying as having Eastern Band Cherokee heritage, Awiakta is not a citizen of the Eastern Band of Cherokee Indians.

== Basketweaving ==
Awiakta draws on Cherokee basket double-weaving traditions throughout the book.

== Adaptations ==
Selu was later adapted into a Grammy-nominated audio recording.
