= Leopold Bachmann =

Swiss real estate investor (1933–2021)

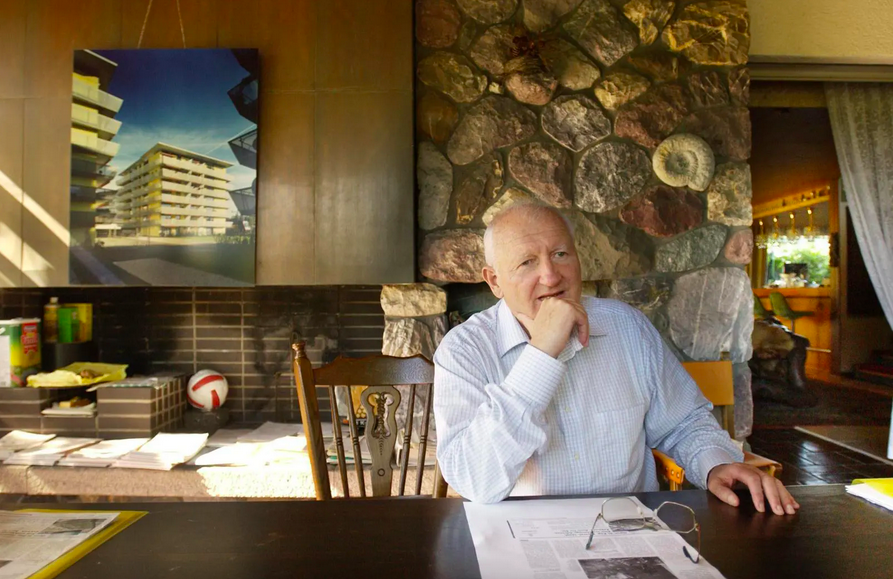
- Bachmann in 2002
- Born: February 22, 1933; Innsbruck in Tyrol, Austria
- Died: December 26, 2021 (aged 88); Zurich, Switzerland
- Occupation: Real estate investor
- Spouse: Johanna Bachmann
- Children: 5

Leopold Bachmann (February 22, 1933 - December 26, 2021) was a Swiss real estate mogul, investor, and philanthropist. He became known as the pioneer of affordable housing in Switzerland.

== Early life ==
Bachmann was born near Innsbruck in Tyrol. He grew up with four siblings and moved to Switzerland in 1954 to study.

== Work ==
He was initially employed as a civil engineer before starting to develop housing projects of his own in 1963.

He became known for his fast and efficient construction methods. While most of Switzerland's new real estate was focused on luxury housing, he chose to build apartments for middle and lower-earning tenants as well as families with children, leading the media to give him the title "low-cost builder of the nation". He built around 1,500 rental apartments in large estates in Zürich, Winterthur and Uster between 1998 and 2003.

He accused the construction industry of "building far too expensively" and thus failing to meet the needs of families and lower-income groups. In 2002, Bachmann was one of the largest private housing providers in Zürich. When he died at the age of 88, he owned around 5,000 apartments as well as other holdings and extensive building land, including the CeCe graphite works site, which he developed in 2007 to hold a residential complex of 515 apartments.

== Philanthropy ==
Bachmann established the private Leopold Bachmann Foundation in 1997, which uses its income to benefit social aid organizations as well as educational and environmental projects around the world. Endowed with an initial equity of more than fifty million Swiss francs from properties contributed by Bachmann, the foundation reportedly made donations of around sixty million Swiss francs in the first twelve years of its existence. As of 2021, it was listed as one of the wealthiest foundations in Switzerland, with assets of around one billion Swiss francs.

== Personal life and legacy ==
An obituary in the Tages-Anzeiger newspaper called Bachmann a "pioneer of affordable housing".

Bachmann was married to Johanna Bachmann, with whom he had five children. He lived in Rüschlikon, near Zürich.

The Leopold Bachmann Foundation continues to be directed by his heirs and works to support social projects and charities in Switzerland and abroad.
