= Jesse Bruchac =

American writer

Jesse Bowman Bruchac
- Born: 1972 (age 53–54)
- Education: B.A., Goddard College
- Occupations: Film Dialect/Dialogue Coach, Translator, Writer, Musician, MMA instructor
- Children: Carolyn Bruchac, Jacob Bruchac
- Website: jbruchac.com

Jesse Bowman Bruchac (born 1972) is an author and language teacher from the Nulhegan Band of the Coosuk Abenaki Nation, a state-recognized tribe in Vermont. He has dedicated much of his life to studying the Abenaki language and preserving the Abenaki culture. He created the first Abenaki language website.

Bruchac has traveled throughout the United States teaching both the Abenaki language and culture. When he is not traveling, Jesse works as the treasurer for The Ndakinna Education Center and teaches wilderness survival classes. He also is an active martial artist, skilled in Brazilian jiu-jitsu, isshin-ryū, pentjak silat, and taekwondo.

Jesse has worked extensively with the Abenaki language and taught other Eastern Algonquian languages including the Lenni Lenape languages Munsee and Unami; Mohegan-Pequot, and Passamaquoddy. He is the webmaster of WesternAbenaki.com, a free online language learning portal. Abenaki scholar Frederick Matthew Wiseman, author of The Voice of the Dawn, calls him an "important contributor to the Abenaki Renaissance."

He has worked in a short film by Alanis Obomsawin, When All the Leaves Are Gone (2010). Jesse was a translator for the AMC hit show Turn: Washington's Spies. Jesse was also a translator, dialect/dialogue coach and composer for the National Geographic movie Saints & Strangers (2015), a film which includes over an hour of translated dialogue in the Western Abenaki language and two months of on set actor training and filming in South Africa with over two dozen actors.

== Life and education ==
Bruchac was born to Joseph Bruchac and Carol Bruchac. He is a member of the Nulhegan Band of the Coosuk Abenaki Nation, a state-recognized tribe in Vermont. Previously, he was a member of the Abenaki Nation of Missisquoi, another state-recognized tribe in Vermont. He attended Saratoga Springs High School. He studied at Goddard College in Plainfield, VT, where he was primarily interested in creating a syllabus for teaching the Abenaki language. Since then, Jesse has dedicated his life to the preservation and revitalization of the Abenaki language and culture. In The Language of Basketmaking, Bruchac particularly focuses on revitalizing important writers such as Henry Lorne Masta and Joseph Laurent. He began teaching conversational Abenaki first at the high school level, and then through the Abenaki Tribal Museum and Cultural Center, until he moved onto other projects in 1999. In 2020, he became director of the new School of Abenaki at Middlebury College.

Bruchac lives in his hometown Greenfield Center, New York, with his two children, Carolyn Bruchac and Jacob Bruchac.

== Martial arts ==
Bruchac began wrestling at the age of 6. In 1990 he became his high school's team captain and the New York State Class A champion for the Suburban Council Championship team, and was awarded the Steve Rue Memorial Award. As an adult, he has competed in six different North American Grappling Association championships. From these, he brought home four gold medals and two silver medals. He has also competed as a part of the International Brazilian Jiu-Jitsu Federation, and from these tournaments has brought home five gold medals. Jesse co-founded Western New York Mixed Martial Arts (WNYMMA) which has "thrived and helped produce major BJJ competitors and MMA talent." In 2011, he joined his brother Jim Bruchac as a martial arts instructor at the Saratoga Kyokushin.

== Public appearances ==
Bruchac appeared in several episodes of a public access television program called Story By Story, which aired out of Proctor's Theater. In 1993, he co-founded a musical group, The Dawnland Singers, with his father Joseph Bruchac, brother James Bruchac, and aunt Marge Bruchac. John Kirk and Ed Lowman are accompanying instrumentalists. The group has performed across the United States, Canada, and Europe; it once opened for The Grateful Dead at Woodstock 2 in Highgate, VT.

In July and August 2011, Bruchac presented at the Adirondack Center for Writing's Native American Writers Series, which celebrates a diverse set of writers, including but not limited to the Abenaki and Mohawk nations.

== Books ==
- Bruchac, Jesse, Joseph Alfred Elie Joubert, and Jeanne A. Brink. L8dwaw8gan Wji Abaznodakaw8gan: The Language of Basket Making. Greenfield Center, NY: Bowman, 2010. ISBN 978-0557632107
- Bruchac, Jesse. Mosbas and the Magic Flute. Greenfield Center, NY: Bowman, 2010. ISBN 978-0878861484
- Bruchac, Jesse. The Woman and the Kiwakw. N.p.: Lulu.com, 2013. ISBN 978-1300657576
- Bruchac, Joseph, and Jesse Bruchac. Nisnol Siboal = Two Rivers: Poems in English and Abenaki. Greenfield Center, NY: Bowman, 2011. ISBN 978-1257430680
- Wzôkhilain, Pial, and Jesse Bruchac. The Gospel of Mark Translated into the Abenaki Indian, English and French Languages. N.p.: Lulu.com, 2011. ISBN 978-1105197055
