= Marilou Awiakta =

American poet

- Born: January 24, 1936 (age 90); Knoxville
- Education: University of Tennessee B.A. magna cum laude, in English and French, 1958
- Occupations: Poet, author
- Children: Three children

Marilou Awiakta (born January 24, 1936, in Knoxville, Tennessee) is an American writer known for her poetry and essays about her experiences growing up in Oak Ridge, Tennessee.

== Biography and career ==
Marilou Awiakta is the seventh generation of her family to grow up in Appalachia, mostly in East Tennessee. Since 1730, her family has lived in the mountainous area of the state.

Awiakta graduated from the University of Tennessee in 1958 receiving a B.A. magna cum laude, in both English and French.

== Awards ==
- Distinguished Tennessee Writer Award, 1989
- Appalachian Heritage Writer's Award, Shepherd College, 2000

== Books ==
- Abiding Appalachia: Where Mountain and Atom Meet. Memphis: Saint Luke's Press, 1978. Rpt. Bell Buckle, TN: Iris Press, 1995. 71 pp. Rp. 2006 Pocahontas Press, 65 pp.
- Rising Fawn and the Fire Mystery: A Child's Christmas in Memphis, 1833. Memphis: Saint Luke's Press, 1983.
- Selu: Seeking the Corn-Mother's Wisdom. Golden, CO: Fulcrum, 1993. A blend of story, essay, and poetry.

== Analysis ==
Awiakta's poetry is analysed at length in Our Fire Survives the Storm by Daniel Heath Justice (Cherokee Nation).
