= Joseph Bruchac =

American writer, poet, and storyteller (born 1942)

- Born: October 16, 1942 (age 84)
- Education: Cornell University (BA); Syracuse University (MA); Union Institute (PhD)
- Occupations: Writer; educator; storyteller
- Spouse: Carol Bruchac (died)
- Children: 2, including Jesse
- Writing career
- Period: 1971–present
- Genres: Fiction; music; poetry
- Notable awards: Spur award
- Website: joebruchac.com

Joseph Bruchac (born October 16, 1942) is an American writer and storyteller based in New York.

He writes about Indigenous peoples of the Americas, with a particular focus on northeastern Native American lives and folklore. He has published poetry, novels, and short stories. Some of his notable works include the novel Dawn Land (1993) and its sequel, Long River (1995), both of which feature a young Abenaki man before European contact.

== Early life and education ==
Bruchac was raised in Saratoga Springs, New York. He earned a Bachelor of Arts in English from Cornell University in 1965. At Cornell, he was a varsity heavyweight wrestler. He earned a master's degree in literature and creative writing from Syracuse University in 1966. He earned a PhD in comparative literature from the Union Institute & University in 1974.

== Career ==
=== Teacher ===
Bruchac volunteered as a teacher in Ghana from 1966 to 1969. He taught English at Skidmore College from 1969 to 1973 and from 1973 to 1981 taught classes to maximum security prisoners as part of a program run by the college.

=== Writing career ===
Bruchac is a writer and storyteller who has published more than 120 books. Much of his work explores Abenaki identity and Native storytelling. He began publishing in 1971 and became a full-time writer in 1981.

In 1999, he received the Lifetime Achievement Award from the Native Writers' Circle of the Americas.

Coauthor with Michael J. Caduto of the Keepers of the Earth series, Bruchac's poems, articles and stories have appeared in over 500 publications, from Akwesasne Notes and The American Poetry Review to National Geographic Magazine and Parabola. He has edited a number of anthologies of contemporary poetry and fiction, including Songs from this Earth on Turtle's Back, Breaking Silence (winner of an American Book Award) and Returning the Gift.

As one of the founders of the Wordcraft Circle of Native American Writers and Storytellers, he has helped Native American authors and authors who identify as being of Native descent get their work published. For more than five decades, he has been a part of Native American literary networks in the Northeast and across the continent, advocating for reciprocal relationships that connect writers, archives, and communities.

With his late wife, Carol, he founded the Greenfield Review Literary Center and the Greenfield Review Press.

=== Musician ===
Bruchac plays several instruments, including the hand drum, Native American flute, and the double wooden flute, which produces two notes at the same time. He performs with his sister, Marge Bruchac, and his sons, Jim and Jesse, as part of The Dawnland Singers.

== Personal life ==
Bruchac lives in Porter Corners, a hamlet in the town of Greenfield, New York. He has two children, Jim and Jesse Bruchac.

He has collaborated on eight books with his son Jim.

Bruchac has studied various martial arts. He has black belts in Brazilian Jiu-Jitsu and karate and runs martial arts classes.

=== Ancestry dispute ===
Bruchac identifies as being of Abenaki, English, and Slovak ancestry. He is a member of the Nulhegan Abenaki Nation, a state-recognized tribe in Vermont. Bruchac said that being Native American was not only about ancestry, and that one could earn "cultural membership" via hard work. He compared it to karate, asking if he was not a black belt in the sport due to not being born as one.

In 1991, Bruchac's sister, Mary Ann Bruchac Lynch, wrote, in response to an article about her brother, that their grandfather had never indicated any Abenaki heritage to their mother, and "he referred to himself only as French Canadian".

Bruchac's claims, and the Nulhegan Abenaki Nation's claims, to Abenaki identity have been contested by the Odanak First Nation in Quebec. In 2025, the Odanak and Wôlinak communities commissioned a genealogical report into prominent members of Vermont-recognised Abenaki groups, over claims they had falsified their Indigenous descent. The report found that Bruchac was "99% European, with one identified Mohawk ancestor". Its conclusions were disputed by the Vermont groups.

== Works ==
- Indian mountain, and other poems, by Joseph Bruchac (1971)
- The Buffalo in the Syracuse Zoo and other poems, by Joseph Bruchac (1972)
- The poetry of pop, by Joe (Joseph) Bruchac (1973)
- Great Meadow: Words of hearsay and heresy, by Joseph Bruchac (1973)
- The Manabozho poems, by Joseph Bruchac (1974)
- Turkey Brother, and other tales: Iroquois folk stories, as told by Joseph Bruchac, illustrated by Kahonhes (Kahionhes) (1975)
- Flow, by Joseph Bruchac (1975)
- The Road to Black Mountain: A Novel, by Joseph Bruchac (1976)
- Garter snakes / Joseph Bruchac (1976)
- Mu'ndu Wi-'go: Ooems from Mohegan stories and the Mohegan diary of Flying Bird (Mrs. Fidelia A. H. Fielding), by Joseph Bruchac (1978)
- There are no trees inside the prison Joseph Bruchac (1978)
- Dreams of Jesse Brown, by Joseph Bruchac. (1978)
- Stone giants & flying heads: Adventure stories of the Iroquois, as told by Joseph Bruchac, illustrated by Kahonhes (Kahionhes) and Brascoupé (1979)
- The good message of Handsome Lake, by Joseph Bruchac (1979)
- How to start and sustain a literary magazine: practical strategies for publications of lasting value, by Joseph Bruchac (1980)
- Iroquois stories: heroes and heroines, monsters and magic, as told by Joseph Bruchac; illustrated by Daniel Burgevin (1985)
- Survival this way: interviews with American Indian poets / Joseph Bruchac (1987)
- Near the mountains, by Joseph Bruchac (1987)
- Keepers of the earth: Native American stories and environmental activities for children, by Michael J. Caduto and Joseph Bruchac, foreword by N. Scott Momaday (Kiowa), illustrations by John Kahionhes Fadden (Mohaw) and Carol Wood (1988) (1997)
- The faithful hunter: Abenaki stories / as told by Joseph Bruchac; illustrations by Kahionhes. (1988)
- Return of the sun: Native American tales from the Northeast Woodlands, by Joseph Bruchac; illustrations by Gary Carpenter. (1989)
- Long memory and other poems, by Joseph Bruchac; illustrations, Kahionhes; translation, Hartmut Lutz = Langes Gedächtnis und andere Gedichte, by Joseph Bruchac; Illustrationen, Kahionhes; Übersetzung, Hartmut Lutz. (1989)
- Native American stories / told by Joseph Bruchac; illustrations by John Kahionhes Fadden. (1991)
- Hoop snakes, hide behinds, and side-hill winders: tall tales from the Adirondacks / by Joseph Bruchac; illustrated by Tom Trujillo. (1991)
- Keepers of the animals: Native American stories and wildlife activities for children / Michael J. Caduto and Joseph Bruchac; foreword by Vine Deloria, Jr.; story illustrations by John Kahionhes Fadden and David Kanietakeron Fadden; chapter illustrations by D.D. Tyler and Carol Wood. (1991)
- Turtle meat and other stories, by Joseph Bruchac; illustrations by Murv Jacob. (1992)
- Native American animal stories, told by Joseph Bruchac; foreword by Vine Deloria, Jr.; illustrations by John Kahionhes Fadden and David Kanietakeron Fadden. (1992)
- Thirteen Moons on Turtle's Back: a Native American Year of Moons, by Joseph Bruchac and Jonathan London; illustrated by Thomas Locker. (1992)
- Flying with the Eagle, Racing the Great Bear: tales from Native North America, told by Joseph Bruchac. (1993) (2011)
- The Native American sweat lodge: history and legends, by Joseph Bruchac 1993)
- Dawn Land: A novel / Joseph Bruchac (1993)
- Fox song / Joseph Bruchac; illustrated by Paul Morin (1993)
- The First Strawberries: A Cherokee story, told by Joseph Bruchac, pictures by Anna Vojtech (1993)
- A boy called Slow: the true story of Sitting Bull / Joseph Bruchac, illustrated by Rocco Baviera (1994)
- Keepers of the night: Native American stories and nocturnal activities for children, by Michael J. Caduto and Joseph Bruchac; story illustrations by David Kanietakeron Fadden; chapter illustrations by Jo Levasseur and Carol Wood; foreword by Merlin D. Tuttle (1994)
- The great ball game : a Muskogee story, told by Joseph Bruchac; illustrated by Susan L. Roth (1994)
- The girl who married the Moon: tales from Native North America told by Joseph Bruchac and Gayle Ross (1994) (2006)
- Keepers of Life: Discovering Plants through Native American Stories and Earth Activities for Children, by Michael J. Caduto and Joseph Bruchac; foreword by Marilou Awiakta; story illustrations by John Kahionhes Fadden and David Kanietakeron Fadden; chapter illustrations by Marjorie C. Leggitt and Carol Wood. (1994)
- The earth under Sky Bear's feet: native American poems of the land / Joseph Bruchac; illustrated by Thomas Locker. (1995)
- Long River : a novel, by Joseph Bruchac (1995)
- The story of the Milky Way: a Cherokee tale, by Joseph Bruchac and Gayle Ross; paintings by Virginia A. Stroud (1995)
- The boy who lived with the bears: and other Iroquois stories, told by Joseph Bruchac; illustrated by Murv Jacob. (1995)
- Gluskabe and the four wishes, told by Joseph Bruchac; illustrated by Christine Nyburg Shrader. (1995)
- Dog people : native dog stories, by Joseph Bruchac. (1995)
- Roots of survival : Native American storytelling and the sacred, by Joseph Bruchac. (1996)
- Between earth & sky : legends of Native American sacred places, by Joseph Bruchac; illustrated by Thomas Locker. (1996)
- Four ancestors : stories, songs, and poems from Native North America, told by Joseph Bruchac; pictures by S.S. Burrus. (1996)
- Children of the longhouse / Joseph Bruchac. (1996)
- Native American gardening : stories, projects, and recipes for families, by Michael J. Caduto and Joseph Bruchac; interior illustrations by Mary Adair, Adelaide Murphy Tyrol, and Carol Wood; foreword by Gary Paul Nabhan; preface by Marjorie Waters. (1996)
- The circle of thanks / told by Joseph Bruchac; pictures by Murv Jacob (1996)
- The maple thanksgiving / written by Joseph Bruchac; illustrated by Anna Vojtech (1996)
- Eagle song / Joseph Bruchac; pictures by Dan Andreasen (1997)
- Many nations : an alphabet of Native America / by Joseph Bruchac; illustrated by Robert F. Goetzl (1997)
- Tell me a tale : a book about storytelling, by Joseph Bruchac (1997)
- Lasting Echoes: An oral history of Native American people, by Joseph Bruchac; assemblage and painting by Paul Morin (1997)
- Bowman's store: a journey to myself, by Joseph Bruchac. (1997) (2001)
- The heart of a chief: with connections, by Joseph Bruchac. (1998)
- The arrow over the door / Joseph Bruchac; pictures by James Watling. (1998)
- When the Chenoo howls : Native American tales of terror / Joseph and James Bruchac; illustrations by William Sauts Netamux́we Bock. (1998)
- The waters between : a novel of the dawn land / Joseph Bruchac. (1998)
- Heart of a chief : a novel / Joseph Bruchac. (1998)
- Seeing the circle / by Joseph Bruchac; photographs by John Christopher Fine. (1999)
- No borders : new poems / Joseph Bruchac. (1999)
- The Trail of Tears / by Joseph Bruchac; illustrated by Diana Magnuson. (1999)
- Squanto's journey : the story of the first Thanksgiving / Joseph Bruchac; illustrated by Greg Shed. (2000)
- Crazy horse's vision / by Joseph Bruchac; illustrated by S.D. Nelson. (2000)
- Sacajawea : the story of Bird Woman and the Lewis and Clark Expedition / Joseph Bruchac. (2000)
- Native American games and stories / James Bruchac and Joseph Bruchac; illustrations by Kayeri Akweks. (2000)
- Trails of tears, paths of beauty / Joseph Bruchac. (2000)
- Pushing up the sky : seven native American plays for children / Joseph Bruchac; illustrated by Teresa Flavin. (2000)
- Skeleton Man / Joseph Bruchac. (2001)
- Journal of Jesse Smoke: a Cherokee boy / Joseph Bruchac. (2001)
- How Chipmunk got his stripes: a tale of bragging and teasing / as told by Joseph Bruchac & James Bruchac; pictures by Jose Aruego & Ariane Dewey. (2001)
- Navajo long walk: the tragic story of a proud people's forced march from their homeland / by Joseph Bruchac; with illustrations and captions by Shonto Begay. (2002)
- Winter people / Joseph Bruchac. (2002)
- Seasons of the circle : a Native American year / by Joseph Bruchac; illustrated by Robert F. Goetzl. (2002)
- Warriors / Joseph Bruchac. (2003)
- Turtle's race with Beaver: a traditional Seneca story / as told by Joseph Bruchac & James Bruchac; pictures by Jose Aruego & Ariane Dewey. (2003)
- Pocahontas / Joseph Bruchac. (2003) (2005)
- Our stories remember : American Indian history, culture, & values through storytelling / Joseph Bruchac. (2003)
- Can Turtle fly? : a Lakota folk tale, told by Joseph Bruchac; illustrated by Gerald McDermott. (2004)
- Rachel Carson : preserving a sense of wonder, by Thomas Locker & Joseph Bruchac (2004)
- The dark pond / Joseph Bruchac; illustrations by Sally Wern Comport. (2004)
- Hidden Roots / Joseph Bruchac. (2004)
- Jim Thorpe's bright path / by Joseph Bruchac; illustrated by S.D. Nelson. (2004)
- Raccoon's last race : a traditional Abenaki story / Joseph Bruchac & James Bruchac; pictures by Jose Aruego & Ariane Dewey. (2004)
- Code talker : a novel about the Navajo Marines of World War Two / Joseph Bruchac. (2005)
- Foot of the mountain and other stories / Joseph Bruchac; illustrations by Chris Charlebois. (2005)
- At the end of Ridge Road / Joseph Bruchac. (2005)
- Whisper in the dark, by Joseph Bruchac; illustrations by Sally Wern Comport. (2005)
- Wabi: a hero's tale, by Joseph Bruchac. (2006)
- Geronimo, by Joseph Bruchac. (2006)
- The return of Skeleton Man, by Joseph Bruchac; illustrations by Sally Wern Comport. (2006)
- Jim Thorpe: original All-American, by Joseph Bruchac. (2006)
- Bearwalker, by Joseph Bruchac; illustrations by Sally Wern Comport. (2007)
- March toward the thunder, by Joseph Bruchac. (2008)
- Lay-ups and long shots: an anthology of short stories, by Joseph Bruchac. (2008)
- The girl who helped thunder and other Native American folktales, told by James Bruchac and Joseph Bruchac; illustrated by Stefano Vitale. (2008)
- Buffalo song, by Joseph Bruchac; illustrated by Bill Farnsworth. (2008)
- Night wings, by Joseph Bruchac; illustrations by Sally Wern Comport. (2009)
- Dawn land, by story by Joseph Bruchac; adaptation and art by Will Davis. (2010)
- My father is taller than a tree / by Joseph Bruchac; illustrated by Wendy Anderson Halperin. (2010)
- Wolf mark, by Joseph Bruchac. (2011)
- Dragon castle, by Joseph Bruchac. (2011)
- Rabbit's snow dance: a traditional Iroquois story, by as told by James and Joseph Bruchac; illustrated by Jeff Newman. (2012)
- Killer of Enemies, by Joseph Bruchac. (Tu Books, 2013)
- Walking two worlds, by Joseph Bruchac. (2015)
- The Hunter's Promise: An Abenaki Tale / By Joseph Bruchac; Illustrated by Bill Farnsworth. (2015)
- Trail of the dead, by Joseph Bruchac. (2015)
- Chenoo: a novel, by Joseph Bruchac. (2016)
- Brothers of the buffalo: a novel about the Red River War / Joseph Bruchac. (2016)
- (The) Long Run / Joseph Bruchac. (2016)
- Talking Leaves / Joseph Bruchac. (2016)
- Arrow of lightning / Joseph Bruchac. (2017)
- Chester Nez and the unbreakable code: a Navajo code talker's story / Joseph Bruchac; pictures by Liz Amini-Holmes. (2018)
- Two roads / Joseph Bruchac. (2018)
- Giving Thanks / Joseph Bruchac. In anthology Thanku: Poems of Gratitude. Ed. Miranda Paul, illustrated by Marlena Myles. (2019)
- Peace Maker, by Joseph Bruchac (2021)

== Awards and honors ==
In 1996, Bruchac was awarded the Knickerbocker Award for Juvenile Literature by the New York Library Association. This recognizes "a New York State author who has demonstrated, through a body of work, a consistently superior quality which supports the curriculum and the educational goals of New York State School".

Bruchac's 2004 work, Jim Thorpe's Bright Path, won the Carter G. Woodson Book Award in 2005.

Other honors include a Rockefeller Humanities fellowship, a National Endowment for the Arts Writing Fellowship for Poetry, the Cherokee Nation Prose Award, the Hope S. Dean Award for Notable Achievement in Children's Literature, and both the 1998 Writer of the Year Award and the 1998 Storyteller of the Year Award from the Wordcraft Circle of Native Writers and Storytellers. He received the annual NWCA Lifetime Achievement Award in 1999.
