= Bel Abbey =

American anthropologist (1916–1992)

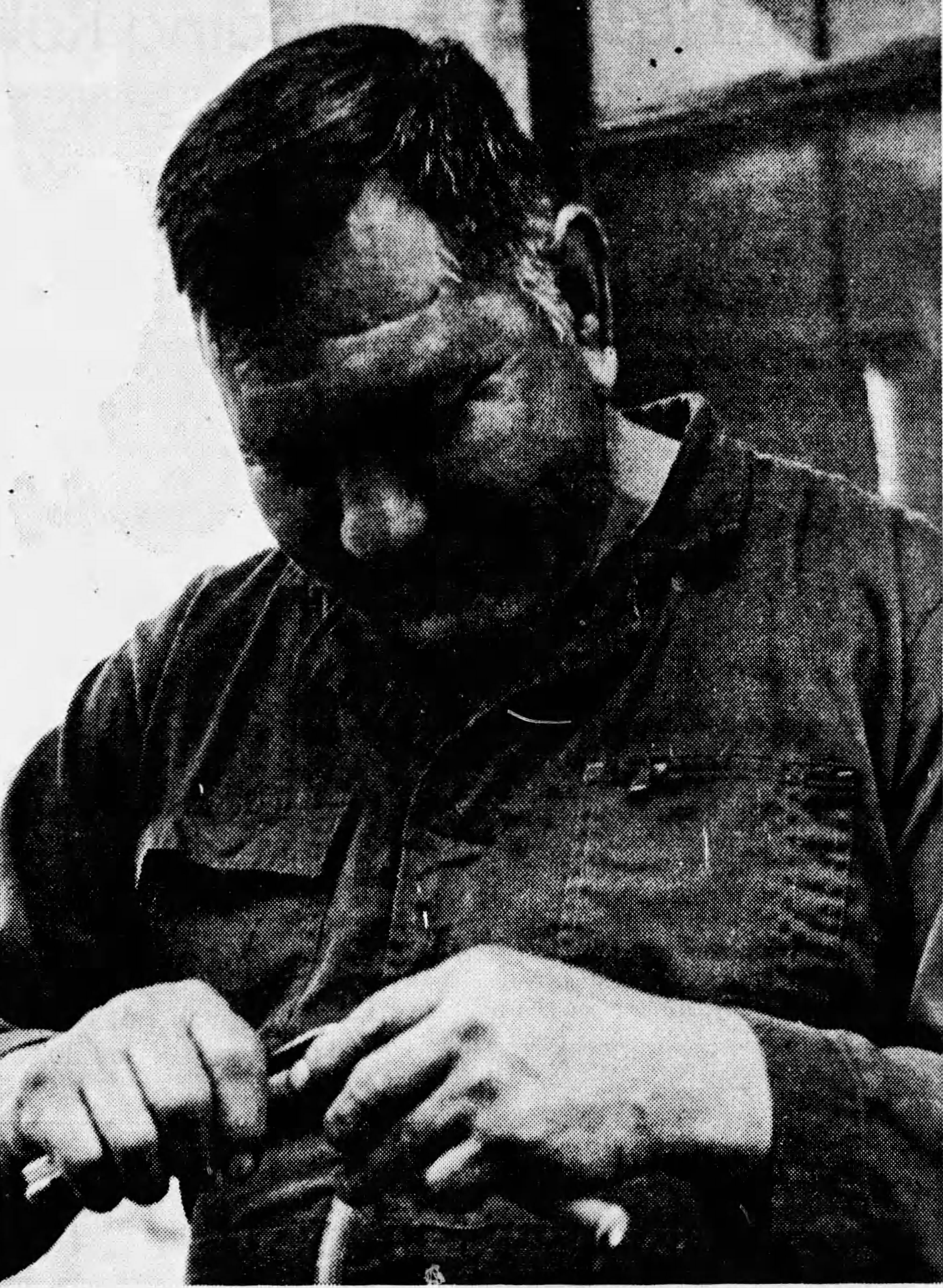
Image of Bel Abbey

Bel Abbey (April 10, 1916 – 1991), was a Koasati folk artist and herbalist who specialized in blowgun making, wood carving, and Koasati storytelling.

Born in a Koasati settlement near Elton, Louisiana, Abbey was raised by his grandmother, mother, and maternal uncles in the traditional Koasati culture—part of the last generation to do so. He grew up speaking Koasati and later learned to speak closely related languages—Alibamu, Choctow, and Mobilian—and unrelated ones, like Cajun French and English. Mainly self-taught, Abbey learned to read and write during World War II.

Abbey translated for his mother, who spoke only Koasati, and became a resource for anthropologists, ethnologists, and linguists studying the language. As a result of his work, Abbey was entered into the 1982 class of the Hall of Master Folk Artists, and he was also selected to be a part of the Smithsonian's 1985 Festival of the American Folklife.

Abbey was an involved church and community member, dedicated to preserving, sharing, and passing down the Koasati language and culture. He recorded the language and traditional stories, and contributed to the publication of the Koasati Grammar in 1991. He died in 1991.
