= Nikki Loftin =

American author of middle grade fiction (born 1972)

- Born: April 12, 1972 (age 54)
- Education: University of Texas at Austin
- Occupation: Writer
- Writing career
- Genre: Middle grade fiction
- Website: www.nikkiloftin.com

Nikki Loftin (born April 12, 1972) is an American author of middle grade fiction. Her first book, The Sinister Sweetness of Splendid Academy, was published by Razorbill/Penguin in August 2012. A second novel, Nightingale's Nest, was released in April 2014.

== Biography ==
Nikki Loftin is an American author of middle grade fiction. Born and raised in Central Texas, she attended The University of Texas at Austin for both her Bachelor of Arts (French, BA, '92) and Master of Arts (English/Fiction Writing, MA, '98) degrees.

Loftin currently resides in Texas.

== Works ==
The Sinister Sweetness of Splendid Academy, Razorbill/Penguin, August 2012.
Nightingale's Nest, Razorbill/Penguin, February 2014.

== Reception ==
The Sinister Sweetness of Splendid Academy has been positively reviewed. Kirkus called The Sinister Sweetness of Splendid Academy "deliciously scary and satisfying," while Shelf Awareness called it "a feast of magic and mystery.". Publishers Weekly found it "mesmerizing... a fantasy that feels simultaneously classic and new." The Austin American Statesman named the novel one of its twelve highly recommended fantasy novels of summer 2012.

Loftin is also a contributor to the Dear Teen Me anthology, which has been named a Junior Library Guild selection.
