= Adele Griffin =

American young adult fiction author

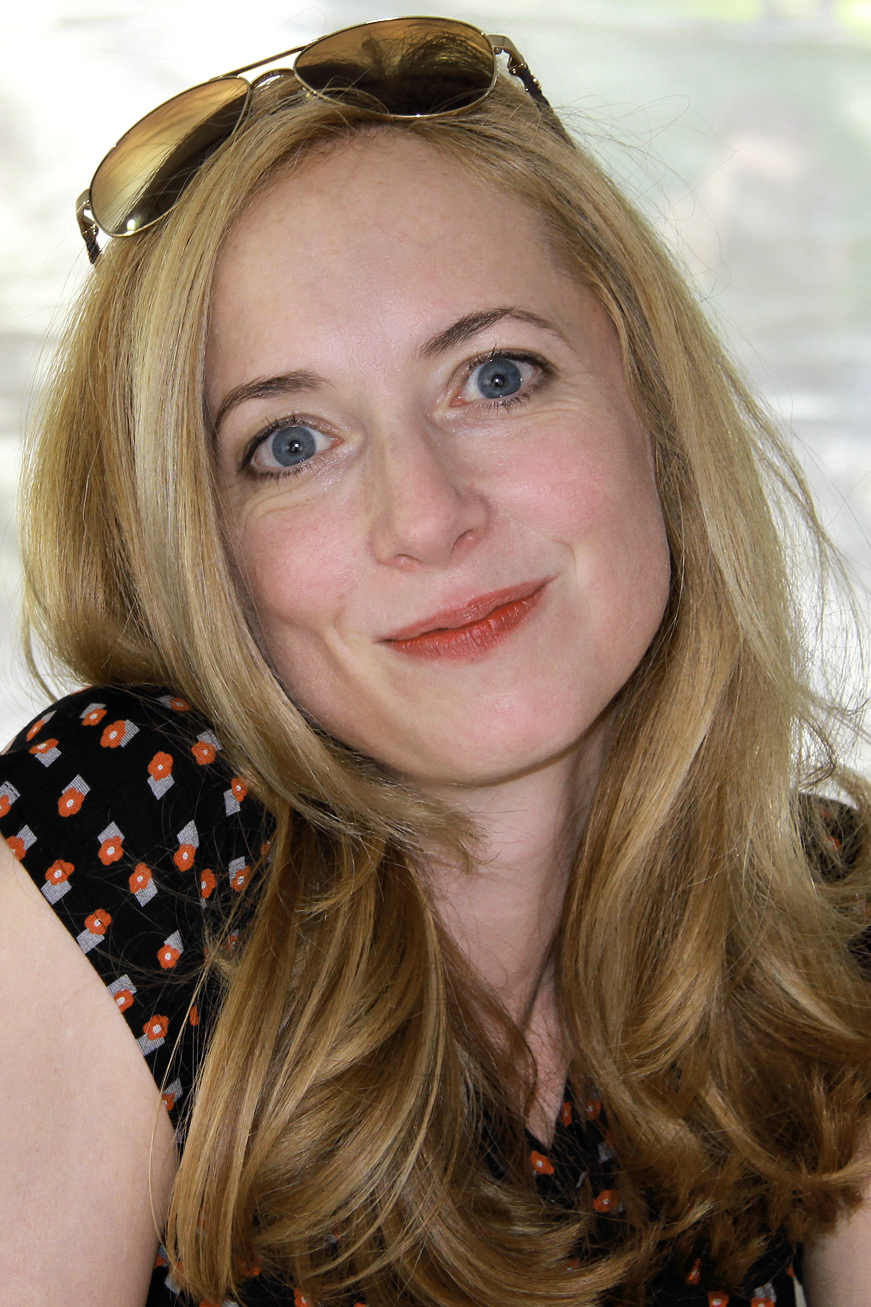
Adele Griffin at the 2014 Texas Book Festival.

Adele Griffin (born July 29, 1970) is the author of over thirty English language books across a variety of genres, including Sons of Liberty and Where I Want to Be, both National Book Award finalists. Her debut adult novel The Favor explores themes of friendship, surrogacy, and nontraditional family building. In 2024, Adele and her mother Dr. Priscilla Sands (former head of the Marlborough School) began cohosting the podcast So, Mom. Adele co-writes a dark romance series with author Julie Buxbaum under the pen name Taylor Hutton.

== Personal life ==
Adele Griffin was born and raised in Philadelphia, Pennsylvania. She lives with her husband and their two children in Los Angeles, California.

== Awards and recognition ==
- 2014 The Unfinished Life of Addison Stone Booklist 100 Best YA Mysteries of the Past 10 Years, YALSA 2015 Best Fiction for Young Adults, Booklist Top Ten Arts Books for Youth, Amazon Best Books 2014: Teen & Young Adult, School Library Journal Best Book 2014, Romantic Times Finalist for Book of the Year
- 2013 Loud Awake & Lost Booklist Editor's Choice, YALSA 2014 Best Fiction for Young Adults
- 2012 All You Never Wanted
- 2011 Tighter: Kirkus Best Book
- 2005 Where I Want to Be: National Book Award finalist, Kirkus Best Book, ALA Best Book
- 2002 Amandine: Publishers Weekly Best Book, ALA Best Book
- 2001 Hannah Divided: Booklist Editor's Choice
- 1998 The Other Shepards: SLJ Best Book, ALA Notable Book and ALA Best Book, Publishers Weekly Best Book
- 1997 Sons of Liberty: National Book Award Finalist, ALA Best Book

== Works ==
- First Love Last Love (Fall 2026)
- The Favor (June 2023)
- The Blackberry Farm series (illustrated by LeUyen Pham)
  1. The Becket List (2019)
  2. All Pets Allowed (2021)
- Tell Me No Lies (2018)
- Be True to Me (2017)
- The Oodlethunks series (illustrated by Mike Wu)
  1. Oona Finds an Egg (2016)
  2. Steg-O-Normous (2016)
  3. Welcome to Camp Woggle (2017)
- The Unfinished Life of Addison Stone (2014)
- Loud Awake and Lost (2013)
- All You Never Wanted (2012)
- Tighter (2011)
- The Julian Game (2010)
- Picture the Dead (2010)
- Vampire Island series
  1. V Is for Vampire (2009)
  2. The Knaveheart’s Curse (2008)
  3. Vampire Island (2007)
- My Almost Epic Summer (2006)
- Where I Want to Be (2005)
- Overnight (2004)
- Hannah, Divided (2003)
- Dive (2002)
- Amandine (2000)
- Witch Twins series
  1. Witch Twins (2001)
  2. Witch Twins at Camp Bliss (2003)
  3. Witch Twins and Melody Malady (2003)
  4. Witch Twins and the Ghost of Glenn Bly (2004)
- The Other Shepards (1998)
- Sons of Liberty (1997)
- Split Just Right (1996)
- Rainy Season (1996)
