= Vermont Abenaki =

Four state-recognized tribes in Vermont identifying as Abenaki

Two chiefs of the Vermont Abenaki speaking at an event.

The Vermont Abenaki are four state-recognized tribes identifying as Abenaki in the state of Vermont in the United States.

They are the following:

- Elnu Abenaki Tribe
- Koasek Abenaki Tribe
- Missisquoi Abenaki Tribe
- Nulhegan Band of the Coosuk Abenaki Nation

Vermont granted them recognition in 2011 and 2012. They also have communities in New Hampshire, where they lack recognition.

Their identity as Indigenous is contested by scholars, the Abenaki First Nations of Odanak and Wôlinak, and the Assembly of First Nations Quebec-Labrador, who say they are committing Indigenous identity fraud. The U.S. Bureau of Indian Affairs and the office of Vermont's attorney general both published reports saying there was no evidence of historical hidden Abenaki communities in Vermont. News outlets such as Vermont Public, VTDigger, and NHPR have revised their coverage on the Vermont Abenaki after newer research into their origins.

== History ==
The Vermont Abenaki say their ancestors were small family bands remaining south of the Canada–United States border in Vermont. They say they hid their Indigenous identity for two centuries, due to policies of sterilization in the state. Their ancestors were sometimes referred to as "gypsies" [sic], as they migrated to sell goods seasonally. Scholar Darryl Leroux and a report by the State of Vermont both stated the group descends from 19th-century French-Canadians who migrated to Northwest Vermont from Canada. (Note: Leroux writes that Catherine Pillard, one of the filles de roi, is claimed as an Indigenous ancestor by many members of the Vermont Abenaki.) Leroux says the Abenaki had to flee north to Canada due to violence by residents of Vermont, and the ones that returned are not related to the Vermont Abenaki. Research by the U.S. Bureau of Indian Affairs and Vermont Public echo these findings.

=== Vermont Eugenics Survey ===
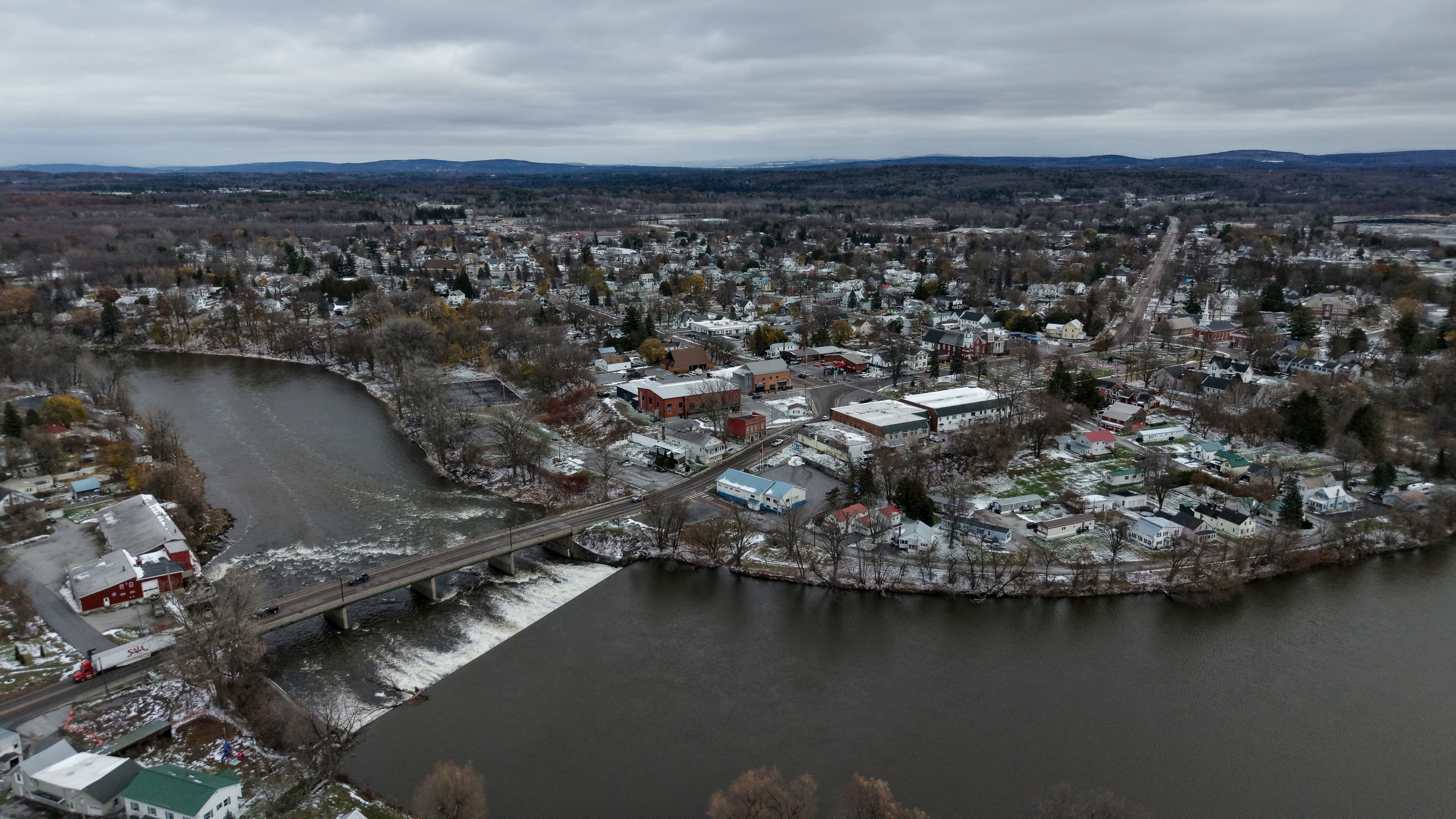
Swanton, in Franklin County, Vermont, where ancestors of the Vermont Abenaki resided.

Henry Farnham Perkins established the Vermont Eugenics Survey in 1925, hoping to establish a relationship between one's degree of French-Canadian ancestry and mental incompetence. In 1991, scholar Kevin Dann said "gypsies" [sic] mentioned in the report had Abenaki ancestry, but did not cite a source for this claim. In 2023, he said he did not find evidence of Abenaki people being targeted by the Vermont Eugenics Survey, which he said chief Homer St. Francis had claimed. Leaders of the Vermont Abenaki say they hid their Native identity out of fear of sterilization during the survey. Some members of the Vermont Abenaki's ancestors were indicated on the survey.

Scholar Richard Witting writes that Swanton, where the ancestors of the Vermont Abenaki resided, had 1-2 sterilizations under the program. Swanton's county, Franklin, had the lowest rate of sterilization in Vermont. Leroux writes that Franklin County had the highest ratio of French-Canadian men working as laborers in Vermont, and that opposition to their labor resulted in the Vermont Eugenics Survey. He says available evidence indicates that families were targeted for being French-Canadian. Scholars write there is no evidence that Abenaki people were targeted by the Vermont Eugenics Survey.

=== Tribal organization ===
The first organized government among the Vermont Abenaki was in the 1970s. Fred Wiseman of the Missisquoi Abenaki Tribe says families from other regions followed suit after Homer St. Francis organized a tribal council. St. Francis said there had been an Abenaki Holocaust in Vermont, citing the writings of Kevin Dann. While he was chief, St. Francis vocally described his desire to have control over large areas of land in the state, which were previously inhabited by the Abenaki.

Then called the St. Francis Band of Abenaki, the Missisquoi won hunting rights within Vermont in State v. St. Francis (1980), but had them removed by the Vermont Supreme Court in State v. Elliot (1992). They had also staged "fish-ins" in 1979, 1988, and 1987, where they fished without licenses. This was done to protest their lack of hunting and fishing rights, and to publicize their claims to land and access to Native American remains.

=== Recognition ===
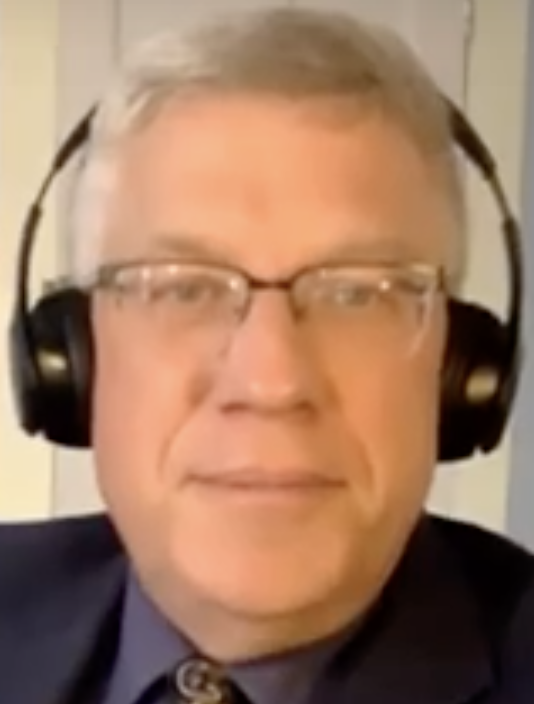
Rep. Tom Stevens said it was racist to require descent to determine indigeneity in Vermont. Descent from Native Americans was removed as a recognition requirement in the state.

The Missisquoi were recognized by Vermont by Governor Thomas P. Salmon in 1976. The following governor, Richard A. Snelling, then withdrew their recognition. The tribe applied for federal recognition in the 1980s.

Vermont recognized these four organizations in 2011 and 2012, after the requirement of demonstrating direct descent from an Indigenous ancestor was removed for state recognition. (Note: Scholar Darryl Leroux writes that modifications to the state recognition process meant that the Vermont Abenaki only needed to prove they lived in areas where Abenaki had lived previously.) The Nulhegan and Elnu were recognized in 2011, and the Missisquoi and Koasek were recognized in 2012. With recognition, the four groups obtained hunting and fishing licenses in Vermont. The First Nations of Odanak and Wôlinak attempted to testify as part of the process, but were barred from doing so. (Note: Their inability to testify was referenced by Seven Days in an article about committee chairs and their influence in politics, as the decision to bar them had been made by the committee chair Vincent Illuzzi.)

Vermont representative Troy Headrick later criticized the state's recognition process, referencing later genealogical research on the Vermont Abenaki. He introduced Bill H.362 to review the state recognition process in Vermont, which did not advance past the House. Democratic representative Tom Stevens stated that he was happy with the current state-recognition process in Vermont. He said a requirement of descendancy from Native Americans to determine indigeneity in Vermont was "supremacist and racist".

A fifth band, the Ko'asek Traditional Band of the Sovereign Abenaki Nation, has failed to achieve state recognition.

==== Federal recognition ====
The Bureau of Indian Affairs rejected the Missisquoi Band in 2007, saying they did not locate evidence of a continuous Abenaki community in Vermont. The tribe failed four out of six criteria required for federal recognition. They wrote that under 1%, or eight people in the band, had any descent from Native Americans. Later in 2016, chief Lawrence 'Moose' Lampman of the Missisquoi expressed his desire to obtain federal recognition via legislation. Representatives for the tribe met with a delegation the same year.

==== Recognition in New Hampshire ====
Representative Sherry Gould, a member of the Nulhegan Band, filed a 2023 resolution to recognize the band in New Hampshire after first being elected in the state. In 2025, a bill in New Hampshire to interface with the Vermont Abenaki failed.

== Activities and programs ==
The Vermont Abenaki hold their annual two day Abenaki Heritage Gathering at the Mount Norris Scout Reservation, located in Eden Mills, Vermont.

=== Vermont Commission on Native American Affairs ===
The Vermont Commission on Native American Affairs (VCNAA) oversees Native American policies and programs in the state, and is appointed by the governor of Vermont. The first chair of the commission was Luke Willard, the former chief of the Nulhegan Band. While he was chairman, the commission approved all four groups in the Vermont Abenaki for state-recognition, after which lawmakers officially recognized them. State-recognized tribes in Vermont are given priority to sit on the commission.

==== School curriculum ====
The Vermont Native American Commission have released a school curriculum regarding the history of the Vermont Abenaki, titled the American Abenaki Curriculum. Vermont company Seventh Generation Inc. donated $50,000 USD towards its creation.

Two Abenaki First Nations in Quebec criticized the curriculum for not mentioning their history, saying they were not consulted in its creation and that Abenaki identity predated colonial borders. The creators said they did not cover the Abenaki in Quebec as the curriculum was meant to cover their communities alone, and to focus on the experiences of Vermonters. Vermont Commission on Native American Affairs chair Dan Coutu said that the commission was created to help Native Americans in Vermont, and not in other states or countries. Some books written by the Vermont Abenaki were removed from Champlain Valley Union High School in 2025.

=== Indian Child Welfare Act ===
The Vermont Department for Children and Families hired an "Indian Child Welfare Act coordinator" in 2022 to handle childcare cases with the Vermont Abenaki. Policy manager Lindsay Barron said that individuals were usually uncertain if they were enrolled Vermont Abenaki, and gave uncertain answers. Journalist Tiffany Tan writes the coordinator will determine and verify if a minor is a registered tribal member.

=== Abenaki language sign ===
In 2020, legislation was passed mandating any new state park signage have Abenaki names listed in addition to English ones. Thus in 2022, an Abenaki-language sign was added to Sweet Pond State Park when the old one was replaced. The sign says Amiskwbi, meaning 'Beaver water' in the Abenaki language. The name is speculatory, as the park is man-made and did not exist in the 1700s. The name was criticized by Odanak First Nation, who said the proper term would be nebes or nebesis, for marsh, and that 'Beaver water' did not correspond to a beaver pond.

== Discussions of origin ==
The Odanak and Wôlinak First Nations in Quebec say the Vermont Abenaki have no Abenaki ancestry, and are identifying as Abenaki with no or little genealogical documentation. They held an event against the Vermont Abenaki in 2022, at the University of Vermont with members of the Tribal Alliance Against Frauds. Odanak musician Mali Obomsawin referred to the Vermont Abenaki as the 'pretendian Abenaki movement' in Vermont, and called them misogynist.

Little Thunder criticized Vermont's Truth and Reconciliation Commission, saying they should have allowed the First Nations of Odanak and Wôlinak to speak about harm to their communities.

In 2023, Lakota activist Beverly Little Thunder resigned from the Vermont Native American Commission, saying members were misogynist and falsely claiming to be Indigenous. She later criticized Vermont's Truth and Reconciliation Commission for not including Abenaki in Quebec. The Odanak and Wôlinak criticized the commission for tying its work to people that it says "identify as Native American or Indigenous", saying these groups cannot confirm legitimate Indigenous ancestry. Former enrolled Vermont Abenaki Douglas Buchholz said he grew up believing he was Indigenous, but discovered he was not after doing research on his genealogy. He said he discovered the same about the Vermont Abenaki after doing further research.

In 2024, Odanak, Wôlinak, and the Assembly of First Nations Quebec-Labrador sent a delegation to the 23rd session of the United Nations Permanent Forum on Indigenous Issues to denounce the Vermont Abenaki and speak at an event on Indigenous identity fraud in Canada and the United States. They sent another to the 17th session of the Expert Mechanism on the Rights of Indigenous Peoples the same year. A study by scholar Richard Witting the same year stated the Vermont Abenaki stated the group was of white origin, and had reimagined themselves as Native Americans using a narrative of persecution using eugenics studies.

At a 2024 University of Vermont symposium addressing contested Indigenous identity, sociologist Darryl Leroux stated the Vermont Abenaki have no Abenaki ancestry. He said a lack demonstation of Abenaki ancestry had stood out in research by both the federal and Vermont governments. (Note: Pam Palmater and Gordon Henry also spoke on Indigenous identity fraud at the event.) The event was denounced by the Vermont Abenaki. Speaking at a course in the same university in 2026, the Odanak and Wôlinak re-iterated their view that the Vermont Abenaki were not of Abenaki origin, and had emerged in 1975.

=== Responses from the Vermont Abenaki ===
Member of the Nulhegan Band discussing the genealogy of the Vermont Abenaki.

In 2023, a symposium where Kim Tallbear and two other attendees spoke about "race-shifting" was held at the University of Vermont. At the event, a member of the Penobscot confronted Vermont Abenaki Brenda Gagne, saying her tribe had falsified its cultural heritage. A delegation from the university met the Missisquoi Tribe to address their grievances regarding the confrontation, which some members of the tribe labelled hate speech. Gagne mentioned that pamphlets were handed out at the event with links to websites denouncing the Vermont Abenaki. The university said they would investigate hate speech, and the tribe was left unsatisfied with the meeting. Leadership of the Vermont Abenaki refers to criticism of their tribes as inaccurate and lateral violence.

Donald Stevens, chief of the Nulhegan Band, says his family is well documented as "being Indian and being gypsies [sic]..." in response to criticism. (Note: APTN News reports that Stevens has one Indigenous ancestor from 1664, Marie Sylvestre, who has 800,000 descendants today and was not Abenaki. They write that genealogies by other media outlets report a similar lack of Abenaki ancestry. Leroux writes that Sylvestre is claimed as an ancestor by several organizations in Canada and the United States, including those in the Vermont Abenaki.) Referring to the Odanak and Wôlinak, he asked legislators why a foreign entity from a foreign country was being entertained over local constituents. Leaders of the Vermont Abenaki asked legislators to ignore requests by the Odanak and Wôlinak to revisit the recognition process in the state. The tribes issued a joint statement saying a report questioning their lineage was an attempt by the Odanak and Wôlinak to obtain money from land claims within Vermont.

=== Impacts of discussions on news coverage ===
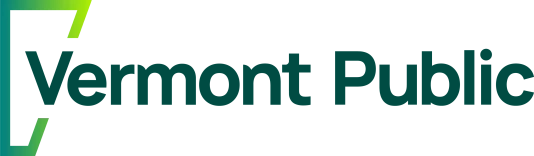
Vermont Public published a report calling the identity of the Vermont Abenaki into question.

News organizations have revised their coverage on the Vermont Abenaki in light of discussion on the Vermont Abenaki.

In 2023, New Hampshire Public Radio published a report stating there is no evidence Stevens was Indigenous. The report said leaders of the Vermont Abenaki had very different definitions of Indigeneity than other tribes. They pledged to verify Indigenous identity claims before reporting on communities in the future. VTDigger published a report on the tribe the same year including critical views of the tribes, in consultation with a member of the Indigenous Journalists Association.

In 2026, Vermont Public refused to rebroadcast an older documentary covering the Vermont Abenaki, stating it lacked recent context on the group. The outlet now directs viewers to a three part series calling their legitimacy into question. They write that the series was created with the assistance of Indigenous editors, including former IJA president Tristan Ahtone. Vermont Public states their investigation produced similar conclusions as those reached by Odanak and Wôlinak.

=== Impact of discussions on conservation groups ===
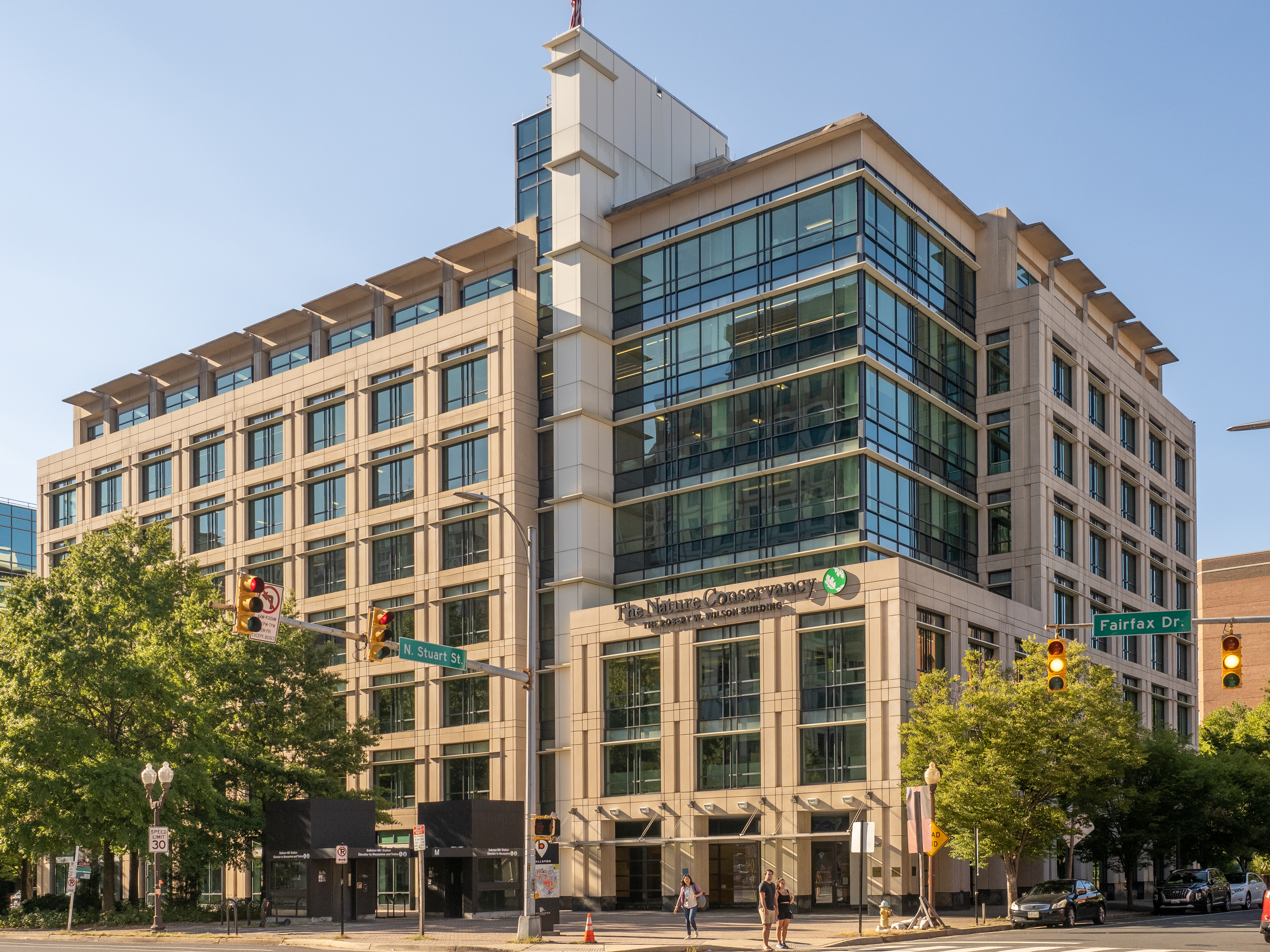
The Nature Conservancy, which allowed Vermont Abenaki hunting and fishing rights on land they owned, paused their relationship with the tribes at the request of Odanak First Nation.

The Odanak First Nation emailed 30 conservation groups in Vermont in June 2023 delineating their view that the Vermont Abenaki are illegitimate. They cited reports from the BIA and Vermont Attorney General's Office.

In response, the South Hero Land Trust and The Nature Conservancy's Vermont chapter both paused collaboration with the Vermont Abenaki. Other groups met with the Odanak virtually in October of that year. A spokesperson for the Elnu Abenaki tribe said the organizations had not expressed interest in offers to share his perspective. He said some educational initiatives had been put on pause due to the controversy.

=== Responses from lawmakers ===
Lawmaker Kesha Ram Hinsdale personally apologized to Odanak First Nation for her role in Vermont's state-recognition process. She said she had been called racist when challenging the Vermont Abenaki during the process, adding that she had been one of the only people of color present. State senator Thomas Chittenden said he was concerned about the residency requirements that excluded Odanak from testifying at hearings pertaining to state-recognition in Vermont. He said he wanted Vermont's Truth and Reconciliation Commission to address Odanak and Wôlinak's concerns.

Katherine Sims, who facilitated the Native caucus of Vermont, said it was an "internal Indigenous issue" and due diligence had already been done. Representative Tom Stevens said he was disappointed in the conversation, and the desire to attack people. Representative Troy Headrick brought Abenaki leaders from Canada to Vermont to host a forum, titled "What if we got it wrong?". He also said Vermont was a cautionary tale, and that state-recognition alone did not address genealogical and historical concerns.

=== Impact of discussions on state recognition outside Vermont ===
==== Bill LD 813 (Maine) ====
Maine Representative Adam R. Lee referenced the state recognition process in Vermont as an argument against the 2025 Bill LD 813, which would establish a similar process in Maine. He said the process had harmed Vermont's relationships with federally recognized tribes. A non-profit organization advocating for Wabanaki people also referenced the concerns of the Odanak and Wôlinak against Vermont when arguing against the process. Maine legislators later rejected the bill.

==== Bill HB 161 (New Hampshire) ====
Vermont representative Troy Headrick advocated against New Hampshire Bill HB 161, referencing statements of the Odanak and Wôlinak asserting the Vermont Abenaki had not suitably proved Abenaki ancestry. Headrick and Daniel Nolett, General Director of the Abenaki Council at Odanak, requested New Hampshire legislators reconsider state recognition of Abenaki-identifying groups in the state. Bill HB 161 later failed.

== See also ==
- Carrizo Comecrudo Nation of Texas
- Eastern Metis
- French-Canadian Americans
- French Vermonters
- History of the Franco-Americans
- Jeanne Brink
- Jesse Bruchac
- Joseph Bruchac
- Social identity theory
- State v. Elliott

== Bibliography ==
- Leroux, Darryl (14 July 2023). "State Recognition and the Dangers of Race Shifting: The Case of Vermont". American Indian Culture and Research Journal. 46 (2): 53–84. doi:10.17953/aicrj.46.2.leroux. ISSN 0161-6463 – via eScholarship.org.
- Artman, Carl J. (22 June 2007). Summary under the Criteria and Evidence for Final Determination against Federal Acknowledgement of the St. Francis/Sokoki Band of Abenakis of Vermont (PDF) (Report). Washington, DC: Department of the Interior.
- Cason, James E. (9 November 2005). Summary under the Criteria for the Proposed Finding on the St. Francis/Sokoki Band of Abenakis of Vermont (PDF) (Report). Washington, D.C.: Department of the Interior.
- Leroux, Darryl (2019). Distorted Descent: White Claims to Indigenous Identity. Winnipeg, Manitoba, Canada: University of Manitoba Press. ISBN 978-0-88755-596-1.
- Sorrell, William H.; Jacobs-Carnahan, Eve (January 2003). State of Vermont’s Response to Petition for Federal Acknowledgment of the St. Francis/Sokoki Band of the Abenaki Nation of Vermont (PDF) (Report) (Second ed.). State of Vermont. Archived (PDF) from the original on 7 April 2025.
- Witting, Richard (2024). Price, Ian; Rockhold, Jocelyn; Colgrove, Nathan; Hessler, Meghan; O’Brien, Monica; Shore, Jacob; Sterner, Abigail; Ueland, Tora; Wapshare, Emma (eds.). "Accounting for Those Sterilized: An Analysis of Eugenical Sterilization Certificates Filed Under Vermont's 1931 Act for Human Betterment by Voluntary Sterilization" (PDF). History Department. The University of Vermont History Review (34). Burlington, VT: University of Vermont. Archived (PDF) from the original on 8 November 2025.
