= Vincent Illuzzi =

American politician

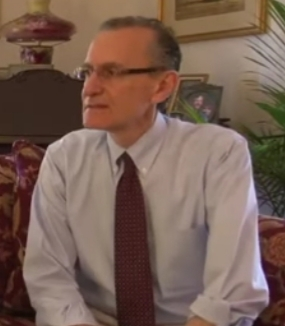

Member of the Vermont Senate from the Essex-Orleans district
- In office January 1981 – January 2013
- Succeeded by: John S. Rodgers

Essex County State's Attorney
- Incumbent
- Assumed office January 1999

Personal details
- Born: Vincent Illuzzi, Jr. September 17, 1953 (age 73) Montpelier, Vermont, U.S.
- Party: Republican
- Other political affiliations: Vermont Progressive; Democratic; Libertarian
- Spouse: Eileen Maher
- Education: Saint Michael's College
- Profession: Attorney

Vincent Illuzzi Jr. (born September 17, 1953) is an American lawyer and politician from Derby, Vermont, who formerly served as a Republican member of the Vermont State Senate representing the Essex-Orleans senate district.

Illuzzi was first elected to the Vermont Senate in 1980. From 1976 to 1979, he was a correspondent for the Burlington Free Press. In 1978, he interviewed Peter Galbraith when he was chair of the Vermont Democratic Party; some 40 years later, they served together in the Senate. At 27, Illuzzi was the youngest person ever elected to the Vermont Senate, a record he held until 2024. He served from 1981 to 2013. He did not run for reelection in 2012, and was the unsuccessful Republican nominee for Vermont Auditor of Accounts.

He currently serves as the State's Attorney for Essex County, although a resident of neighboring Orleans County. The question of residency was the subject of a State Superior Court case:

Arguably, there is an equally compelling policy reason for allowing voters to elect officials who do not reside in the voters’ county: it increases the pool of eligible candidates to fill those positions. Such a consideration may be important for small counties like Essex which may have few lawyers or law enforcement officers willing to run for state's attorney or sheriff. Without a residency requirement, voters may be better assured that they are electing the most competent and qualified person willing to hold the office. If the framers had intended county officials to be county residents, they would have specifically mandated that in the constitution.
- Noble v. Sec’y of State, No. 48-9-10 Excv (Manley, J., Oct. 21, 2010)

== Background and personal life ==
Vincent Illuzzi was born in Montpelier, Vermont, on September 17, 1953. An attorney, he received his A.B. degree from Saint Michael's College in 1975 and a J.D. degree from Vermont Law School in 1978.

Illuzzi is married to Eileen Maher. The couple live in Derby and have one son, Vincent.

Illuzzi is the son of Vincent Illuzzzi, Sr. (1920–2013), born in Giovinazzo, Italy, who emigrated to the US at the age of 17 and became a granite sculptor. Illuzzi Sr. carved one of the largest monuments ever shipped from Barre, a granite sculpture depicting a person chained to a wall that is part of the Taras Shevchenko Memorial located near Dupont Circle, Washington DC. He also supported the restoration of the Old Labor Hall and the Vermont Granite Museum in Barre. In 2012, the newspaper Seven Days published a tribute to the elder Vincent Illuzzi, titled "Rock Star."

As Illuzzi Jr. summed it up when he delivered his father's eulogy:

Not bad for a 17 year old kid with an eighth grade education who couldn't speak English who left home and traveled to a faraway place called America to make his mark on life.

Illuzzi was a correspondent for the Burlington Free Press from 1973 through 1978, covering mostly Barre-Montpelier local news. He started working summers during college and then throughout law school on a part-time basis. His recollections from those days are captured in the PBS documentary Headline Vermont.

In a 1974 article, he documented the Democratic Platform Convention and a resolution made by Peter Galbraith condemning Nixon's pardon.

== Public life ==
=== Senate ===
Illuzzi was first elected to the Senate in 1980 and was re-elected every two years through 2010.

In the Senate, he served as Assistant Minority leader from 1985 to 1988 and Assistant Republican leader from 1991 to 1992 and 1997 to 2005. He served as Republican leader in 2005.

=== Legislative accomplishments ===
In 2005, Illuzzi was appointed chair of the Senate Economic Development, General Affairs & Housing Committee, and served on the Senate Appropriations Committee.

The Economic Development Committee was substantially responsible for the Vermont Recovery and Reinvestment Act (Act 54 of 2009, or H. 313) the purpose of which was “to promote the economic development of the state and the prosperity of its businesses and citizens. In the near-term . . . to address the immediate economic crisis facing Vermont.”

In November 2010, Illuzzi was honored at the Vermont Businesses for Social Responsibility (VBSR) annual conference for his "conviction and courage in taking the deficit in the Unemployment Insurance (UI) Fund head on" and passing "a bill out of his committee that offered a viable solution." "In 2009 Senator Illuzzi also worked with VBSR to ensure passage of the Farm to Plate Investment Program law."

Six years later, the Farm to Plate initiative, a part of Act 54 of 2009, appeared "to be doing its job and has noticeably helped bolster Vermont's farm and food economy" according to a report conducted by the Vermont Sustainable Jobs Fund.

Another major bill introduced by the Economic Development Committee was S. 288, the “Jobs Bill,” which became Act 78 of 2010. This law appropriated $8.665 million to build on the work in Act 54 of 2009. It included funding for the Vermont Economic Development Authority to buy down interest rates on approved projects; the Vermont Telecommunications Authority for rural broadband deployment; the Vermont Employment Training Program to assist with training Vermont workers; marketing tourism in regional markets; assisting Vermont farmers to restructure and refinance debt and other projects.

The committee also cleaned up the law regarding the sale and ownership of mobile homes, making clear to municipalities, and to the buyers and sellers of mobile homes, their rights and responsibilities. Mobile homes are the only way that many Vermonters can secure affordable housing, but the law never had been comprehensively updated. Act 140 of 2010, or H. 542

The committee was also charged with finding cost savings and efficiencies in the Unified Economic Development Budget, which includes regional development corporations, regional planning commissions and workforce development programs. To that end, it implemented "Challenges for Change. Act 146 of 2010, or H. 792

Governor Howard Dean, whose tenure as governor largely tracked Illuzzi's tenure as chair of Senate Institutions, on December 10, 2002, said at the dedication ceremony of the McFarland House that Illuzzi had been particularly sympathetic to the appropriation requests from Washington County.

Illuzzi served as chair of the Senate Committee on Economic Development, General and Military Affairs from 2005. In October 2007, he was on a week-long diplomatic trade mission to Taiwan, that included Rhode Island's lieutenant governor and legislative leaders from Maine, Rhode Island, Massachusetts and New Hampshire, when that country was Vermont's number two trading partner.

In that capacity, on March 30, 2012, Illuzzi, along with fellow committee members, Senators Peter Galbraith and Bill Doyle, visited Windham County to be accessible to and to hear testimony from local officials, business owners on the effects of the uncertainty surrounding the possible closure of the Vermont Yankee Nuclear Plant and the region's recovery from Tropical Storm Irene. Numerous individuals testified, likely even more than listed in the official meeting record. A video of the hearing is available, courtesy of Brattleboro Community Television.

Sen. Illuzzi and Sen. Hinda Miller (D-Chittenden) introduced a bill, S. 208, on January 3, 2012, that would make some changes to the healthcare reform bill. Illuzzi argued that until the state is fully ready to implement a single payer health care model, insurance plans that are working should be left up and running. The proposed bill allowed the Health Exchange to comply with federal law but take advantage of different options.

In a 2012 "Miscellaneous Tax Bill", Illuzzi, whose brother is a dentist, spoke in favor of an amendment in favor of a sales tax exemption for the toothbrushes dentists hand out to patients. He argued that dentists see the toothbrushes and floss they hand out as gifts that help send a message about proper oral hygiene.

After serving in the State Senate for 31 years, the Caledonian Record summed up his career by saying: "His ability to work with both sides of the aisle has been praised by moderates who admire his work ethic and his ability to get things done."

In that 2012 article, Illuzzi said by way of summary:

"When I entered the political arena as a Republican almost a third of a century ago, I quickly found myself voting as a moderate Vermont Republican. In those early years, I served with independent-thinking individuals like Senators Arthur Gibb, Robert Gannett and George Little. They too were moderate Vermont Republicans.

"I learned from them that Vermont leaders have a responsibility to act in the best interest of all Vermonters regardless of party affiliation."

Stated in a different way, former Vermont Democratic Party Chairwoman Judy Bevans was quoted in a Burlington Free Press article:

“Vince Illuzzi is a strange person,” Bevans said, eliciting laughter from the crowd (she later said she meant he's an anomaly). “He actively supported Peter Welch. He was one of those people who really did bridge the gaps.”

Seven Days conducted an admittedly unscientific survey in 2010 in which Illuzzi received 10 votes as the "Best Dealmaker" in the legislature. Illuzzi was quoted in that article as saying, "When you're a Republican in a dominantly Democratic legislature, you need to be able to talk to everybody and make things work."

=== Vermont Veterans' Cemetery ===
An example of how Illuzzi used the legislative appropriation process to champion Vermont values is his inclusion of the following provision in a 1992 Capital Construction Bill:

The Vermont veterans' memorial cemetery. . . shall allow for freedom of choice by the family of a veteran, a veteran's spouse and a veteran's minor child, who will be interred, of an upright or flat memorialization to mark the grave. Preference shall be given to the use of Vermont granite, Vermont slate, and Vermont marble for all memorialization. Cf: 20 V.S.A. § 1585

While the national Veterans' Administration preferred to use markers flush to the ground to make it easier to mow the grass and maintain the grounds, Illuzzi recalled his father's work as a sculptor in the granite industry and knew that markers flush to the ground are not as visually significant and their use would certainly undercut the Barre granite industry and the West Rutland and Proctor marble industry.

After including that requirement as a condition of the appropriation, the US Department of Veterans Affairs reconsidered its national policy and about six months after the Vermont cemetery opened, the Secretary of Veterans Affairs on January 19, 1994, authorized the nationwide reintroduction of upright granite headstones.

While Illuzzi was unable to attend on the day of the dedication of the cemetery, as chair of the Senate Institutions Committee, he designated a member of the committee, Senator Julius Canns of St. Johnsbury, Caledonia County, to appear and speak in his place. Senator Canns was a World War II veteran who served in the Pacific Theatre as a sergeant in the U. S. Marine Corps and he is now buried at that cemetery.

=== Mt. Mansfield Towers ===
A controversy developed in 1996 involving the Mt. Mansfield Colocation Association, WCAX and other entities wanting access to Vermont's highest mountain for transmission purposes.

Sens. Illuzzi and Elizabeth Ready, D-Addison, proposed that a five-member public commission replace the private Mt. Mansfield Colocation Association as the organization charged with planning the future of the peak.

"There is an inherent unfairness when you have a competitor acting as a regulator," Illuzzi said. "All we wanted was fairness."

Just five minutes before lawmakers were to hold a hearing on the proposal Thursday, the competing stations announced they had made a deal. Peter Martin of WCAX-TV, chairman of the Mount Mansfield association, presented lawmakers with the letter of agreement, which said WFFF-TV could join the group in developing a master plan for the mountaintop. The new station's tower would be part of the plan, Martin said.

In 2005, the State appropriated $425,000 for either Vermont Public Television conversion to digital broadcasting format and/or their share of the colocation project on Mt. Mansfield.

H.518 FY06 Capital Bill Act 43, signed by the Gov. 6/7/2005

Sec. 17. VERMONT PUBLIC TELEVISION

The sum of $425,000 is appropriated to the department of buildings and general services for Vermont Public Television for either or a portion of both of the following purposes:

(1) The federally mandated conversion of Vermont Public Television's transmission sites to digital broadcasting format.

(2) Vermont Public Television's share of the costs of a state-mandated collocation project on Mount Mansfield.

=== Old Labor Hall ===
Illuzzi led the effort to secure the first state appropriation to save from likely demolition the Socialist Labor Party Hall, also known as the Old Labor Hall, at 46 Granite Street in Barre. A section of the 1998 Capital Bill provided for the sum of $30,000 to be matched “when two dollars have been raised from non-state sources, for each dollar appropriated.” The provision specifically stated that “the match from non-state sources may include in-kind contributions,” making the seed money a community endeavor. Later, the building was slated for a foreclosure auction and several Barre residents were concerned it would be torn down. Illuzzi, as chair of the Senate Institutions Committee (1991–2015), and with support from Washington County Sen. Bill Doyle, a member of that committee, successfully secured a $40,000 appropriation in 2001 to the “Barre Historical Society, Inc., for restoration and repair of flood damage to Old Labor Hall”, to stave off the foreclosure and convince the local bank that the Barre Historical Society could raise the necessary funds to pay off the mortgage and restore the building.

=== The Champion Lands purchase ===
A major accomplishment during Illuzzi's tenure as chair of the Senate Institutions committee (1991–2013) was the purchase of the Champion Lands in Essex County. Now renamed the Kingdom Heritage Lands, it has been called "one of the largest and wildest swaths of forest in the state."

In 1997, Champion International Co, one of the world's largest paper companies, put up for sale 133,000 acres in VT and 200,000 acres in NH & NY. A coalition of conservation groups supported a $26.5 M deal to buy the land in VT. The overall deal required the legislature to approve $4.5 M with private foundations and The Conservation Fund to come up with the remainder, all part of a $76.2 M deal to buy all 300,000 acres of Champions holdings.

In commenting on negotiations intended to bring together competing interests on the use of the land, Illuzzi was quoted as saying, "We seized a monumental, but momentary opportunity to protect and preserve an invaluable resource for generations to come.... I am convinced our children will be always grateful."

The extent to which the state's share of the land, the “core reserve” of the West Mountain Wildlife Management Area, would remain in a virtually pristine condition, continued to be a subject of negotiations in the state legislature in 2002. Illuzzi floated a proposal to attempt to break the logjam.

=== Vermont Granite Museum ===
The Vermont Granite Museum of Barre, incorporated in 1995, was another project spearheaded by Illuzzi, when he was chair of the Senate Institutions Committee. From 1895 to 1975, the Jones Brothers Company had operated two granite sheds on North Main Street in Barre. The remaining shed was falling into a state of disrepair. Washington County Senators Bill Doyle, Matt Krauss and other Washington County legislators approached Illuzzi to help Barre residents secure state funding to preserve the building before it collapsed. In a 2001 capital bill, at Illuzzi's recommendation, a $200,000 state appropriation was included as well as a provision encouraging the cities of Bare and Montpelier and the towns of Barre and Berlin authorize their own appropriations "for the purpose of contributing to the acquisition, development, and improvement" of the Museum.

=== Haskell Free Library and Opera House ===
From 1993 to 1997, the opera house was closed due to government requirements involving handicapped access and fire safety. After a year of construction, and the addition of sprinklers, an elevator, and a fire escape tower – all respecting the historic character of the building – the opera house was reopened amid much fanfare.

The project to make safety and accessibility improvements required bipartisan in the Vermont legislature as well as international support.The improvements were required by the State of Vermont, and the Province of Quebec through its cultural ministry agreed to pay 40 percent of certain renovations. The Vermont Legislature's intent was that an appropriation would enable the facility to be reopened and operated, in accordance with the original will of its donor, as a cultural resource benefiting all members of the unique American and Canadian community. The renovations themselves entailed bi-national cooperation.

=== CCC Campground and State Park; Spruce Peak development in Stowe ===
In the mid- to late 1990s, Sen. Illuzzi and Rep. Robert Wood of Brandon were approached by President Hank Greenberg of AIG, owner of the Mount Mansfield Company, to help lay the groundwork to build the Spruce Peak Project.

Illuzzi chaired the Senate Institutions Committee while Wood chaired the House Institutions Committee. Those two committees are in effect the public works and infrastructure committees of the Vermont General Assembly and oversee state lands and buildings.

Greenberg needed legislative approval to remove the 1930s Smugglers Notch State Park, which was built by the depression era Civilian Conservation Corps (CCC), from land near where The Lodge at Spruce Peak would be located. When the then surviving members of the CCC crew that built the campground and park, a significant historic site, heard of the proposals, they protested the destruction of this testament to their work as young men, part of the New Deal.

Illuzzi met with the Vermont CCC Alumni Association and then he and Wood held legislative hearings at the State House with the then elderly CCC workers, and some of the descendants of those who already had died. Following those efforts, Illuzzi and Wood struck a compromise with Greenberg, whereby the General Assembly authorized moving the entire CCC park and campground on the condition that it be rebuilt, stone by stone, structure by structure, at a new location in the Smugglers' Notch State Park, all at the expense of the Mt. Mansfield Company. “All of the historic structures originally built by the Civilian Conservation Corps were carefully relocated and restored, preserving the work of these pioneering conservationists.” The compromise recognized the contributions of the then young CCC workers to their state and country. The park was relocated in 2003.

The enabling legislation arranged land transfers in the area conditioned on the CCC facilities being “relocated in the Smuggler's Notch area in a manner which is consistent with the appropriate provisions of the historic preservation compliance procedure." J.R.H. 118 (Act R-170 of the Laws of 1996) subdiv. (6) as amended by Act 148 of the Laws of 1998 Sec. 35, authorizing the commissioner of forests, parks and recreation:

(1) To exchange lands with the [Mount Mansfield] company . . . the exchange shall take place simultaneously with the execution of a lease between the state and the company permitting the state to continue to use and operate the campground at its present location, at no cost to the state and until such time as the conditions of subdivision (6)(A) of said resolution have been met.

(2) To exchange lands with the company, by which the company shall convey to the state a parcel of approximately 35 acres, as a site for relocating the campground, including a 200-foot-wide permanent protective easement surrounding the parcel, as a buffer to enhance a wilderness experience at the campground, in return for which the state shall convey to the company a parcel of approximately 115 acres, with the following conditions:

(A) The appraised value of the parcel to be conveyed by the company shall be equal to or greater than the appraised value of the parcel to be conveyed by the state; or, if the appraised value of the parcel to be conveyed by the company is determined to be less than the appraised value of the parcel to be conveyed by the state, then the exchange shall be modified by increasing the amount of company land to be conveyed, or by decreasing the amount of state-owned land to be conveyed, or both, so that as a result the value of the land conveyed by the company is equal to or greater than the value of the land conveyed by the state; after the completion of appraisals referred to in this subdivision regarding land to be exchanged, each such appraisal shall be public information.

The lease with Smugglers' Notch Resort, within Mt. Mansfield State Forest in Cambridge and Stowe was also amended to incorporateland on which ski trails are located in addition to ski trail corridors connecting Sterling Mountain of the Smugglers' Notch Resort with Spruce Peak of the Mt. Mansfield Company, Inc. J.R.H. 160 (Resolution 223 of the Laws of 1998, Sec. 5(A)

=== Indigenous peoples in Vermont ===
Illuzzi established a relationship with Chief Homer St. Francis shortly after a "fish-in" in Franklin County which resulted in charges of fishing without a license against a group of the Missisquoi Abenaki Tribe, a subpart of the Western Abenaki Tribe. The defendants moved to dismiss the charges based on the doctrine of "aboriginal rights." District Court Judge Joseph Wolchick agreed but his decision was later reversed by the Vermont Supreme Court, in State v. Elliot.

St. Francis later testified in the Senate Institutions Committee in connection with the purchase of a historic burial ground on Monument Road in Swanton. In subsequent years, state appropriations from the annual capital construction act for activities concerning Native Americans were recorded as follows:

- 1989 - $43,750 - In Highgate, for a precontact burial site and to stabilize the Mississquoi River bank - Act 52, sec. 4(b)(2)
- 1991 - $50,000 - To secure land to bury Abenaki remains - Act 93, sec. 4(c)
- 1995 - $200,000 -This reparation was made possible under Illuzzi's leadership by the inclusion of the appropriation in a Capital Bill for the “purchase of a parcel of land, including buildings and improvements, in Highgate, which is recognized as a significant Native American burial ground dating as far back as circa 885 B.C. to 100 B.C.”Act 62, sec. 20 According to an Associated Press account: At the behest of the Abenaki Indians, the State of Vermont is planning to buy property in the nearby town of Highgate where an ancient Abenaki burial ground was disturbed 21 years ago, when a house was built on the site. The purchase will allow the remains to be reburied at the site, where they had been undisturbed for dozens of centuries until 1974.
- 1996 - $25,000 - To restore the Native American burial ground historic site in Highgate and assist with the reburial of remains at the site. Act 185, sec. 18i
- 1997 - $5,000 - To study the feasibility of rehabilitating a historic building in Swanton for a Native American cultural heritage museum, "with each dollar used from this appropriation to be matched with two dollars contributed from non state sources" Act 62, sec. 12(b)

At a February 29, 2008, Senate Economic Development Committee Hearing, April St. Francis Merrill daughter of Chief Homer St Francis testified along with others in support of tribal recognition. At that time, Illuzzi was quoted as saying, “What I’ve said to them is that we cannot pass a bill that upsets as many as it pleases. Everybody's got their positions and they're well-reasoned, and I respect their positions ... Right now, it's up to the different groups to come to some consensus.” The Bill on the Recognition of Tribes and Bands of Native Americans, passed the Senate but was not enacted into law. The bill proposed that the state of Vermont recognize the Koasek Traditional Band of the Sovereign Abenaki Nation (led by Chief Brian Chenevert and Chief Nancy Millette), the Sovereign Abenaki Nation of Missisquoi St. Francis/Sokoki Band (led by Chief April St. Francis), and the Nulhegan Band of the Abenaki Nation (led by Chief Luke Willard) as original Native American tribes who reside in Vermont.

In 2011, when Illuzzi was chair of Senate Economic Development, Housing and General Affairs, statutory changes were made to the Governor's Commission on Native American Affairs, including that commission members receive a per diem stipend.

By the 2011-2012 Legislative Session, several bills sponsored by Illuzzi became law recognizing the Nulhegan Band of the Coosuk Abenaki Nation and the Elnu Abenaki Tribe as state-recognized tribes by the state of Vermont. as well as a bill which legally recognized the Koasek Abenaki as a tribe.

Responding to criticism of his support of these bills, Illuzzi said at the time that “critics have been unable to explain to him why it would hurt the state to recognize what he described as tribes ‘that have existed here for generations but have been required to go underground because of the eugenics movement and other anti-Indian sentiments of the past. Until they convince me otherwise I'm on board.’”

Illuzzi worked with the Abenaki for years and his efforts are still seeing results years later. A 2020 news article explored his association with Don Stevens, a political activist and chief of the Nulhegan Band of the Coosuk-Abenaki Nation. Stevens said that Illuzzi "touched all the bases and smoothed the way to the legislation being enacted by the General Assembly and being signed into law by [then-governor] Peter Shumlin."

In October 2023, Vermont Public produced a special series from Brave Little State entitled Recognized about Abenaki peoples and the ongoing dispute about who belongs to their communities. Illuzzi is quoted in the podcast. VTDigger also addressed the issue and quoted Illuzzi on the issue of recognition of the Vermont tribes as saying:

Like anything else, the Legislature's like a jury. Somebody comes in and makes their case and you choose to believe them or not,. . . . And you know, we chose to believe them.

In a 2026 WCAX article about a confrontation between a member of the Abenaki Nation of Missisquoi and Rep. Troy Headrick, I-Burlington, who was hosting members of the Odanak First Nation of Quebec, Illuzzi was quoted:

They [the later recognized tribes] didn’t show up one day and say, ‘Hey, let’s go to the Statehouse and get recognized.’ This was a lifelong process for many of these people .... These folks had demonstrated to our satisfaction that they were descendants of Abenakis that used to roam these hills and valleys thousands of years.

=== Working Lands ===
Illuzzi chaired the conference committee that created the Working Lands Enterprise Fund and Board [cf Working Lands Enterprise Initiative] which became law in May 2012. The legislation's intent was to “stimulate a concerted economic development effort on behalf of Vermont's agriculture and forest product sectors by ... advancing entrepreneurism, business development, and job creation.”

=== Abenaki Tribal Forest ===
Illuzzi helped support the creation of “the first communal land of the Nulhegan Abenaki in 200 years” in a forest in Barton, VT. Illuzzi assisted a coalition consisting of the Vermont Land Trust, the Sierra Club, and the VT Housing & Conservation Board, in finding a solution with the town of Barton enabling the Abenaki to purchase the land. Of the project, Illuzzi said at the time:

As one of the state senators from the NEK, it has been my pleasure to actively support this project. I am proud to live in a state where we can forge such creative, new, approaches to deal with the issues of wildlife conservation, economic development, and setting right the historic wrongs suffered by the Native American people. This is the “Vermont Way.”

The nonprofit Abenaki Helping Abenaki bought the land in December 2012.

=== Merger of Central Vermont Public Service into Green Mountain Power ===
On October 17, 2011, Vincent Illuzzi and 45 other Vermont residents and ratepayers filed a motion to intervene in a Public Service Board Docket over the merger of Central Vermont Public Service [CVPS] into Green Mountain Power [GMP] and in addition filed a Petition to Appoint Independent Counsel to ensure that the ratepayers’ interest and the public good of Vermonters was well represented in the proceedings.

By intervening in the case, Illuzzi was able to strengthen the hand of Vermont Department of Public Service [DPS] Commissioner Miller to press GMP and its parent company Gaz Métro (now Énergir) for as many seats as possible on the privately owned, but regulated transmission operator, the Vermont Electric Power Company VELCO. The result is that while Gaz Métro held majority control of the board, it operated with public members and was therefore obligated to consider the "public good" before proposing policy changes that may adversely impact retail electric customers.

As noted in the Board's Final Order dated June 15, 2012:

Several parties reached settlement agreements with the Petitioners that increased or clarified the benefits to be provided to ratepayers and other entities as a result of the Proposed Transaction. . . . The DPS MOU also improves the Petitioners' proposal for preventing the Combined Company from exercising majority shareholder control over VELCO and VT Transco. pp. 5-6

Illuzzi's effort to champion the "public good" in electricity transmission followed the scholarship "to enhance the transparency of RTO [Regional Transmission Organizations] governance and other measures (including greater state governmental involvement) to increase the diversity of views presented" and perhaps also a legacy of former Gov. George Aiken.

=== Search and rescue ===
On the evening of January 9, 2012, Levi Duclos, 19 of New Haven, Connecticut, was reported as an overdue hiker in Ripton. Police initiated a ground search on the morning of Jan 10 during which Duclos was found dead. Illuzzi proposed a study committee to address criticism of the Vermont State Police response to the missing hiker report. Iluzzi was quoted at the time as saying, "The [Vermont State Police] is still a relatively small police force...and we can’t expect them to respond to every rescue, and therein lies the problem."

Illuzzi's ideas that “the department of public safety ... develop and implement an interim protocol establishing responsibility and authority for search and rescue operations” and to create “a search and rescue strategic plan development committee to recommend how search and rescue operations ... be conducted in Vermont on a permanent basis” were incorporated in a larger bill making changes in municipal government that was enacted into law in May 2012. S. 106 (Act 155), sec. 30 & 31

In 2013, a state search and rescue coordinator was named. Today there exists within the Vermont State Police a dedicated Search and Rescue Team which coordinates with the Department of Fish & Wildlife and other local and regional private and municipal rescue services.

=== Resolutions ===
Illuzzi was also instrumental in using the March 2012 meeting to honor former State Senator Robert Gannett in what would turn out to be his last public appearance. State Representative Sarah Edwards read the Senate Concurrent Resolution honoring Gannett.

In 1992, Illuzzi authored what became a Joint Resolution ordering that the new Addison County courthouse in Middlebury, Vermont be named the Judge Frank Mahady Courthouse.

Illuzzi led the effort to name the courthouse in Chittenden County after Judge Edward Costello, who served as chief trial judge from 1967 to 1980. The resolution is quoted as stating that "...during all of those years, Judge Costello was known as a fair, efficient and impartial judge..."

During his tenure in the Senate, Illuzzi either led or otherwise guided the effort to rename a number of other State facilities, including: the Asa Bloomer State Office Building in Rutland; the Robert H. Wood Jr. Criminal Justice and Fire Service Training Center of Vermont in Pittsford; the Edgar M. Weed State Fish Hatchery in Grand Isle; the John J. Zampieri State Office Building in Burlington; the Emory A. Hebard State Office Building and the adjacent Warren "Jersey" Drown Parking Facility in Newport.

=== Other government service ===
Illuzzi holds the office of Essex County State's Attorney, to which he was first elected in 1998. He has been endorsed by and accepted the nomination of all parties to serve in this office.

In December 2025, Illuzzi prosecuted a case in which a defendant convicted of trafficking in methamphetamine was found in possession of "a stack of EBT and gift cards, wrapped with rubber bands, along with the pound of methamphetamine." The defendant "had been accepting the EBT cards, which are provided to needy Vermonters in order to buy food, in exchange for payment of drugs."

He also served on the Governor's Committee on Children and Youth and the Governor's Commission on the Administration of Justice.

=== Statewide office ===
In 2007, Illuzzi was mentioned by then State Senator Peter Shumlin (a Democrat) as a potential independent candidate for governor.

In 2012, Illuzzi chose to run for State Auditor, as Republican incumbent Tom Salmon was retiring. Illuzzi had reportedly considered running as an independent. He had some endorsements from labor unions, and had hoped that would make voters not see him as a typical Republican. The Caledonian-Record endorsed his candidacy, saying:

The Republican candidate, Senator Vince Illuzzi of Newport, has served 32 years in the Senate, and also for many years as Essex County state's attorney. A liberal Republican who has been elected on both party tickets, he has earned high marks from both sides for his mastery of the legislative process and his knowledge of the workings of state government.

Iluzzi lost in the general election to Democratic and Progressive candidate Doug Hoffer. He said after the election, "It was a tsunami for Democrats... I can sense that running as a Republican was a real liability."

== Robert Drew ==
On October 11, 1993, on Larry King Live, Paul Bogosian, a local talk show host, and Illuzzi "heatedly argued the facts" of the case of Robert Drew, a Vermont native who was on death row in Texas for the previous 10 years for stabbing a teenager, with a Texas legislator and a district attorney in Amarillo Texas.

A co-defendant was sentenced to life in prison after testifying that Drew carried out the killing, but recanted his story 101 days after Drew was sentenced to death. Texas law states that new evidence must be presented within 30 days of sentencing, so the recantation could not be used in Drew's appeals.

Illuzzi said with respect to the Texas law which prohibits the introduction of new evidence more than 30 days after a defendant's sentencing, “You folks are making the decisions here on the basis of a calendar when what you are dealing with is a man's life.”

Gov. Howard Dean of Vermont had urged his Texas counterpart, Gov. Ann W. Richards, to commute Mr. Drew's sentence.

After the CNN show, a Texas appellate court granted an injunction stopping the execution hours before Drew was scheduled to be executed. His appeal to the Fifth Circuit Court of Appeals was denied on August 1, 1994, and Drew was executed on August 2, 1994.

== Controversy ==
In 1993, Illuzzi received a six-month suspension of his law license for filing three complaints to the Judicial Conduct Board against Vermont Judge David Suntag. The complaints related to Suntag's scheduling Essex County cases in other courtrooms. During the fifth month of his suspension, the Vermont Supreme Court and the Vermont Professional Conduct Board found that Illuzzi had made unfounded complaints against a trial judge, and his law license suspension was continued. His license was restored in 1998.

The Vermont Supreme Court, over the years, has attempted to close some of the more rural courthouses. Essex County has always been on the list. In 1992, responding to appeals from Essex County's assistant judges that Judge David Suntag was hearing Essex County family court cases as far away as Chelsea, over 100 miles (160 km) away, Illuzzi inserted a provision in that year's Capital Construction Bill that read included the sentence: "No Essex Family Court cases shall be heard at any other location, except Guildhall."

Suntag subsequently scheduled cases elsewhere. Illuzzi, on his Senate letterhead, then filed complaints against Suntag with the Judicial Conduct Board. The leading complaints related to Suntag's continued refusal to hold family court hearings in Essex County at the court house in Guildhall. Illuzzi was not involved in those cases as an attorney.

The Judicial Conduct Board of the Vermont Supreme Court dismissed the complaints against Suntag and filed a complaint against Illuzzi for filing them. Since Illuzzi was a lawyer, the Supreme Court had jurisdiction over his law license.

The Professional Conduct Board, which is appointed by the Supreme Court, investigated the Court's complaint and recommended Illuzzi be disbarred for filing the complaint in his capacity as a state senator against Suntag. Suntag's wife, the Bar Counsel, prosecuted Illuzzi. The charges were that Illuzzi violated the Vermont Bar's Disciplinary Rule DR 8-101(A)(2) (a lawyer who holds public office shall not use position to influence tribunal to act in favor of himself or client); DR 1-102(A)(5) (a lawyer shall not engage in conduct prejudicial to administration of justice); and DR 1 -102(A)(7) (lawyer shall not engage in conduct that adversely reflects on fitness to practice law). Illuzzi stipulated to an 18-month suspension with the expectation that his stipulations would mitigate the Supreme Court's complaint, but the Professional Conduct Board recommended disbarment.

Illuzzi appealed the Board's recommendation to the Vermont Supreme Court and he asked that Justices Gibson, Dooley, Johnson and Morse recuse themselves because they filed the complaint and would be sitting in judgment of the resolution of the complaint, and other reasons. When Dooley, Johnson and Morse refused, he sued them in U.S. District Court. The presiding federal district court judge delayed ruling on the case until Dooley, Johnson and Morse recused themselves (164 VT 623). A substitute Supreme Court then agreed to a negotiated 18-month suspension of Illuzzi's law license (165 VT 598). In ratifying the suspension, the Supreme Court noted that Illuzzi had been guilty of five prior disciplinary offenses.

As of February 9, 1998, Illuzzi had completed all requirements for reinstatement of his license to practice law, including successful completion of an ethics course and support from other lawyers and judges. However, the Court refused to sign the two-sentence reinstatement order until July 28, 1998. Three days later, the state's largest newspaper, The Burlington Free Press, editorialized that Illuzzi was being unfairly treated by the Supreme Court. The editorial was titled "Disorder in the court: Vermont's Supreme Court behaved in far too political and personal a fashion in the case of state Sen. Vincent Illuzzi". The editorial criticized the Court for its handling of the case and commented: "The court restored Illuzzi's license to practice law this week, but that is no more remedy than a bank robber's returning the cash. Illuzzi, who never deserved to lose his license in the first place, should have had it back six months ago."

However, the General Assembly heard arguments against reelecting Suntag for another six-year term of office, but ultimately voted him in. (Vermont judges are reelected by the General Assembly every six years.)

Illuzzi was profiled in a Boston Globe article by Jon Margolis shortly after he was reinstated to practice.

== "A rush to judge the judge" ==
In 2006, Vermont District Court Judge Edward Cashman was criticized by a WCAX reporter, Brain Joyce, for handing down a “60 day sentence” in a case of a child rapist, State v Hulett. The reporter went on to say that the judge “no longer believes in punishment and is more concerned about rehabilitation." Bill O'Reilly of the O’Reilly Factor, then focussed national attention on the case, repeating the criticism.

Illuzzi pointed out that the “national outcry has been based on the grossly inaccurate report of a remark the judge never actually made.” The facts were: “Judge Cashman never said he did not believe in punishment. What he did say was . . . ‘And I keep telling prosecutors, and they won't hear me, that punishment is not enough.’ “

In the Hulett case, the Vermont Department of Corrections policy in effect at the time of the initial sentencing would not offer treatment for the offender if he were to be incarcerated, while another policy would release him after serving just 60 days of a 60-day-to-10-year sentence. The Judge was forced to balance the alternatives available to him.

Illuzzi's commentary was also reprinted in the Boston Globe.

Judge Cashman resentenced Hulett to 3–10 years because the State administration had changed its policy so that offenders like Hulett could get treatment on the inside.

In January 2020, Hulett was sentenced in the US District Court in Rutland to a term of 120 months in prison and a ten-year term of supervised release upon his plea to possession of child pornography. Hulett is currently incarcerated at FCI Otisville with a release date of November 20, 2027.

== Non-governmental service ==
Illuzzi is a member of the Assembly of Overseers of Dartmouth Hitchcock Medical Center, and serves on the National Advisory Board of the Calvin Coolidge Presidential Foundation.

While in Vermont Law School, he served as a student member on the board.

As a private citizen, Illuzzi testified on April 8, 2021, before the Vermont Senate Natural Resources and Energy Committee concerning provisions of bill relating to the management of fish and wildlife.

== Post-Senate career ==
After losing the 2012 election for auditor, Illuzzi resumed practicing law full-time. He also advises clients on legislation and government relations.

Illuzzi questioned the State Department of Corrections decision to release on furlough an habitual offender, Harley Breer, to live in a remote community with little police coverage. “The rural Northeast Kingdom, the town of Canaan, is not an appropriate placement for someone with Mr. Breer's history," Illuzzi was quoted as saying.

== See also ==
- Members of the Vermont Senate, 2005-2006 session
- Members of the Vermont Senate, 2007-2008 session

Party political offices
Preceded by Thomas M. Salmon	Republican nominee for Vermont State Auditor; 2012	Vacant Title next held by Dan Feliciano
