= Jeanne Brink =

American basket artist and cultural preservation (born 1944)

Jeanne Anne (DeForge) Brink
- Born: November 12, 1944; Montpelier, Vermont
- Died: August 5, 2025; Madisonville, Tennessee
- Citizenship: United States
- Education: Norwich University
- Occupations: Artist and cultural preservationist

Jeanne Brink (1944-2025) was an American artist who specialized in traditional basket making, and the cultural and linguistic preservation of the Abenaki people. She was a member of the Abenaki Nation of Missisquoi. Brink was known for her miniature fancy baskets and for co-compiling a Western Abenaki dictionary.

== Biography ==
Jeanne Brink was born in Montpelier, Vermont on November 12, 1944. Jeanne passed away on August 5, 2025 at Madisonville, Tennessee at the age of 80. Her accomplishments were memorialized in a story published by Vermont Public Radio at the time of her death. She was a member of the Obomsawin family of Thompson's Point, Vermont; her great-grandfather Simon Obomsawin was originally from the Odanak Reservation in Quebec, and moved to Vermont in the early 20th century.

Her grandmother Elvine Obomsawin and great-aunts were basketmakers and spoke Western Abenaki, but Brink's mother and aunts moved away from the traditions in order to be more accultured into Anglo society. Marie Elvine Obomsawin was born 1886 in Odanak. Brink's mother, Nettie Royce, was born in 1925 in Florida before the family returned to Vermont.

Brink attended Vermont College of Norwich University and earned an MA in Native American Studies, a BA in liberal studies, and AS in executive administrative assistance. From her obituary: In 2018, the Trustees of Middlebury College recognized her contributions to the Abenaki arts and folklife by awarding her an honorary Doctorate of Arts degree.

=== Career ===
Brink started to learn basketmaking in 1986. Her first experience with basket-making was a class with a non-native teacher. She was frustrated and did not finish the basket. She spoke with her mother, who explained that students do not start with baskets, but with bookmarks, in order to learn the techniques.

She was the first recipient of the Arts Apprenticeship Program from the Vermont Folklife Center. She studied under Sophie Nolett, an Abenaki basketmaker in Odanak, for 2 years. She did not anticipate making this her career but wanted to continue the family tradition. All of Brink's students were said to be of Abenaki heritage in order to preserve this cultural tradition; she has had 26 apprentices.

Brink was a consultant and teacher who held workshops and lectured about Abenaki culture, language, history, and basketmaking. She served as the cultural awareness director of the Dawnland Center in Montpelier. She coordinated pow-wows traditional arts and crafts, and the W'Abenaki Dancers.

In order to preserve the culture and history, Brink has also interviewed and recorded Abenaki people to keep the oral tradition alive.

Her work is in the collections: Memorial Hall Museum and Worcester Art Museum in Massachusetts; New Hampshire Historical Society; Chimney Point State Historic Site, and St Albans Historical Society in Vermont.

Brink has been the artist-in-residence at Dartmouth College, Arts Center at Old Forge, New York, and Worcester Art Museum. She received grants from Vermont Council on the Arts and Vermont Council on the Humanities, received an Award of Merit from Vermont Council on the Arts.

Her cultural heritage work included being the project director and curator of the material culture and art exhibit "Spirit of the Abenaki" and co-director and curator of Abenaki art exhibit "Shamanism, Magic and the Busy Spider."

She sat on the board of directors for Robert Hull Fleming Museum at the University of Vermont, and Vermont Historical Society in Montpelier.

After being appointed by Governor Jim Douglas, Brink served on the Vermont Commission on Native American Affairs for a short time at its outset about 2006 and appeared in roll-calls until at least March 2008.

=== Authorship ===
Starting in 1989, Brink worked with Gordon Day to compile an Abenaki dictionary. They wrote the Alnobaodwa Western Abenaki Language Guide, and Brink digitized Day's Western Abenaki Dictionary.

In 2006, she published a children's book called Malian's Song, which tells the story of the 1759 attack by British Major Robert Rogers on the St. Francis Abenaki community. The story follows the eyewitness account of Brink's grandmother Elvine Obomsawin who lived through the raid. Brink's ancestor Malian Obomsawin wrote "Lonesome Song" after the event.

=== Artist style ===
Brink is known for her miniature fancy baskets. She used sweetgrass and is known for a green candy-stripe pattern using sweetgrass.

=== Personal life ===
Brink is the mother of 3 and grandmother of 6. She lived with her husband in Barre, Vermont before moving to Madisonville, Tennessee later in life to be with family.

== Published works ==
- Bruchac, Margaret M. Malian's Song. Lebanon, Vermont Folklife Center, 2005.
- Bruchac, Jesse Bowman, Joseph Alfred Elie Joubert, and Jeanne A. Brink. L8dwaw8gan Wji Abaznodakaw8gan: The Language of Basket Making. United States, Bowman Books, 2010.
- Day, Gordon. Western Abenaki Dictionary, Volume 1: Abenaki-English. Canadian Museum of Civilization. 1994.

== Recognition ==
- 2018, Honorary Degree from Middlebury College
