= Sherry Gould =

American politician

Member of the New Hampshire House of Representatives from the Merrimack 8th district
- In office December 7, 2022 – December 2024

Personal details
- Party: Democratic (until 2024); Republican (June 1, 2024)

Sherry Gould was an American politician. She served as a member for the Merrimack 8th district of the New Hampshire House of Representatives for one two-year term. At the end of her term she switched to the Republican Party in the spring of 2024.

== Background ==
Sherry Gould is an enrolled member of the Nulhegan Band of the Coosuk Abenaki Nation. She is a basketmaker, tribal genealogist for the Nulhegan Band, and was named to the board of directors of the Mount Kearsarge Indian Museum in 2006. Gould had previously been an independently contracted genealogist, and assisted in the creation of a 2004 genealogy of settlers in Bradford, New Hampshire.

=== Analysis of ancestry ===
In 2023, NHPR reported that when interviewed about her ancestry, Gould said she concluded her mother's family was Abenaki after finding newspapers discussing them living a "gypsy" [sic] lifestyle during the 1800s-1900s. She successfully petitioned New Hampshire to change her mother's birth certificate from "white" to "Native American".

Separate genealogical studies by genealogist Dominique Ritchot, former Vermont Abenaki Douglas Buchholz, NHPR, and Vermont Public conclude she has no connection to the Abenaki people.

== Political career ==
Gould was formerly the chair of the New Hampshire Commission on Native American Affairs.

In 2023, she sponsored Senate Bill 231, to establish a tax credit on historic housing, and establish appropriations for affordable housing and workforce housing.

In 2024, she contributed to a report recommending physician assistants have the requirement of supervision by physicians removed. It also recommended the modernization of their practice laws, which the report said would improve patient care.
