= Missiquoi =

Historic First Nations people in Quebec and Vermont

Total population
- fewer than 2,101

Regions with significant populations
- Quebec, formerly Vermont

Languages
- Western Abenaki language, English, Canadian French

Related ethnic groups
- other Western Abenaki groups

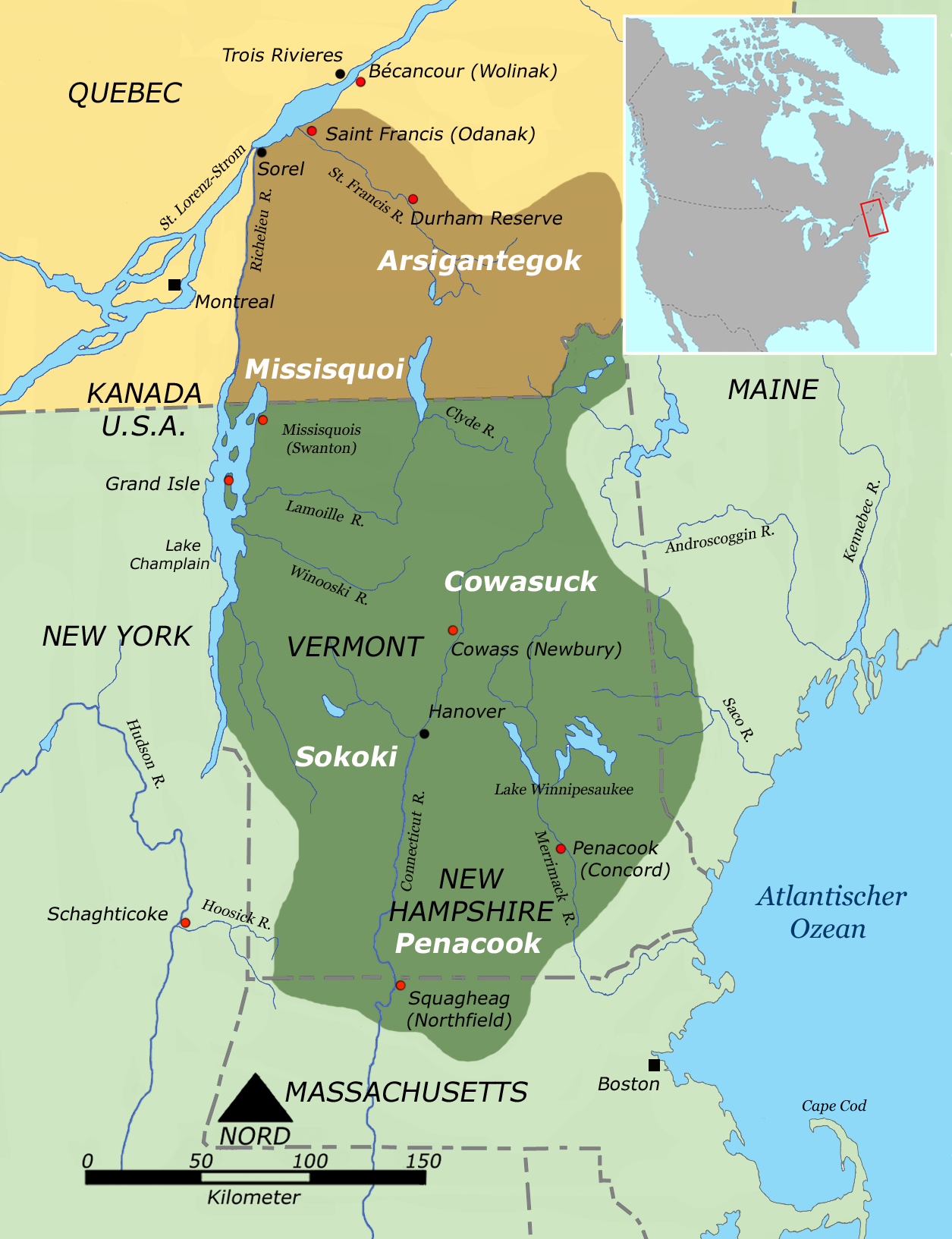
Missiquoi territory within the larger Western Abenaki territory

The Missiquoi, or the Missisquoi (Abenaki: mazipskoi sg., mazipskoiak pl.), were a historic band of Abenaki Indigenous peoples who resided in what is now southern Quebec and northern Vermont. This group lived along the northern and eastern shores of Lake Champlain at the time of the European incursion. After the US Revolution, they retreated to Odanak, driven away by the incursion of New England settlers. Today, they are part of the Abenaki First Nation at Odanak.

Missiquoi is also the name of a 17th-century Abenaki i village in northern Vermont, for which the sub-tribe was named.

== Name ==
The name Missisquoi comes from mazipskoiak meaning "flint people," which comes from mazipskoik or "at the flint," meaning a chert quarry near what is now Swanton, Vermont. It's also spelled Missiassik or Masipskoik a word that means "where there are many big rocks or boulder" in Abenaki.

== History ==
Prior to European contact, some Western Abenaki founded villages at the mouth of the Missisquoi River. By the 17th century, Western Abenaki from across Lake Champlain consolidated into the main village at Missisquoi in northern Vermont, so historians began to use the term "Missisquoi tribe" for all Champlain Valley Abenakis.

After enduring French and English colonists, the Missisquoi withdrew from areas of conflict during the American Revolutionary War. Linguist and historian Gordon M. Day wrote, "After this war, the Western Abenakis did not return to any of their former locations in force but rather united or reunited with their brethren at Saint Francis." Some held on to land claims in the United States and even collected rent. In 1805, the British Crown deeded lands near Durham, Quebec, to Abenaki people who fled the American Revolutionary War; these lands became the Durham Reserve.

By 1850, this group became part of the large St. Francis village (Odanak).

== State-recognized tribe ==
The St. Francis-Sokoki Band of the Abenaki Nation of Missisquoi is state-recognized by Vermont and claim to be Missiquoi descendants. The group is based in Swanton, Vermont. The Abenaki First Nations at Odanak and Wôlinak do not recognize this band or the other three Vermont state-recognized groups as Abenaki, or as relations.

The group applied for but was denied U.S. federal recognition as a Native American tribe in 2007. The summary of the proposed finding (PF) stated that "The SSA petitioner claims to have descended as a group mainly from a Western Abenaki Indian tribe, most specifically, the Missisquoi Indians" and went on to state: "However, the available evidence does not demonstrate that the petitioner or its claimed ancestors descended from the St. Francis Indians of Quebec, a Missiquoi Abenaki entity in Vermont, any other Western Abenaki group, or an Indian entity from New England or Canada. Instead, the PF concluded that the petitioner is a collection of individuals of claimed but undemonstrated Indian ancestry 'with little or no social or historical connection with each other before the early 1970's'...."

== See also ==
- Missisquoi River
- Missisquoi County, Quebec
- Missisquoi National Wildlife Refuge
- Brome—Missisquoi, an electoral riding formerly known as Missisquoi
- Brome-Missisquoi Regional County Municipality, Quebec
- Treaty of Watertown
