= Marblehead Riot of 1677 =

Due to King Philip's War, tensions were rising along the East coast, and in 1677, a riot in Marblehead, Massachusetts transpired. After Native American troops devised a plan to intercept and capture fishing boats from the English, citizens of Massachusetts decided that it was time to fight back. This led to several English fishermen capturing two natives and bringing them to a port in Marblehead. The natives were then violently beaten to death by a group of angry women.

== Background ==
=== King Philip's War and Impact on Community ===
In 1677, Marblehead, Massachusetts was full of tension much like many of the east coast colonies at the time. These tensions stemmed from King Philip's War which took place from 1675 to 1678. This war involved guerilla warfare in which it is reported that nearly every citizen of Marblehead, Massachusetts had lost a family member or friend. In addition to losing friends and family members, Marblehead was hit hard economically due to an interference in trade and rising taxes to fund the war. Scholars have stated that King Philip's War "amounted to twenty-one pounds per household, a sum more than the annual salary of the deputy governor of Connecticut at the time."

In addition to English communities being highly impacted, Native communities were also greatly affected by this war. Men, women, and children that resided in Native communities were "killed, carried to captivity, or died of starvation and exposure as a result of raids and attacks." Although many of the Natives did not actively participate in this war, just like the English women, they lost many friends and family members and their community quickly fell towards devastation.

=== King Philip's War and Impact on Women ===
During these challenging times, gender roles began to shift rapidly and women were greatly affected. As the war went on, women were not necessarily involved in physical combat; however, many became "widows and refugees who scrambled to find ways to survive." Because of this shift, women were no longer sitting by passively awaiting for their husbands to protect them. Instead, "disregarding the commands of authorities, these women directed their hostility against those they viewed to be to blame for their suffering." Many citizens, specifically women, were becoming anxious due to the war, and they felt a need to protect their family. King Philip's War, among other smaller wars, pushed English women to "disobey the law and defy deeply rooted cultural conventions concerning respect for authority." Therefore, colonial women during this time period began to attack those involved in governmental processes like tax collectors and constables. The Marblehead women began to take initiative in performing attacks and uprisings because it was their job to control the household and protect their families.

== The Uprising ==
The origin of the riot occurring in Marblehead, Massachusetts during 1677 can be traced back to December 1676 where Mugg Heigon, a member of the Sokokis tribe, proposed a way to destroy Boston by interfering with fishing boats and taking resources from the English. This kind of guerilla style warfare was not uncommon due to the rising tensions of King Philip's War. Therefore, the Natives intercepted and captured many fishing boats which were run primarily by citizens of Marblehead. Massachusetts reacted to these attacks by sending out 40-50 men in order to protect the ships that were going out.

In 1677, residents of Marblehead were notified that a ship was taken, and they assumed that everyone on the ship was killed; however, when the ship later returned safely, Marblehead citizens discovered that the fishermen had taken two Natives as captives. After arriving in Marblehead, the fishermen were surrounded with concerned citizens but also a group of women who proceeded to "stone and club" the Natives to death. Romeo states that the women "grabbed the Indian men by the hair" and beat them until their heads and flesh were gone. Even after the Natives had died, the women continued to attack and mutilate their lifeless bodies.

== Commentary involving the riot ==
Scholars have argued that this act of violence is solely due to the increasing tensions and guerilla style warfare that occurred during King Philip's War. However, there are many theories about why the women may have attacked the Natives so violently. Some of these include the idea that the women believed that if the prisoners were taken to Boston, they "would have been set at liberty." This argument seems almost sympathetic to the women due to the fact that they were only attempting to protect their families.

However, another argument is the idea that this riot should be documented as the "nastiest riot in seventeenth-century colonial America." This explanation differs from the previous as it does not show any sympathy for the women who attacked the Natives and argues against any excuses for the torture that these Natives experienced. By stating that this riot is nasty, it sets an overall negative connotation for the event and shows a sense of condemnation for the perpetrators.
