= Koasek Abenaki Tribe =

State-recognized tribe in Vermont, United States

https://koasek.org/
- Koasek Traditional Band of the Koas Abenaki Nation
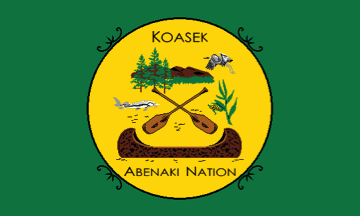
- Flag
- Named after: Cowasuck, Abenaki word for "young pine tree", Abenaki people
- Type: Vermont state-recognized tribe
- Location: United States
- Official language: English
- Website: koasek.org

The Koasek Traditional Band of the Koas Abenaki Nation is a state-recognized tribe in Vermont, who claim descent from Abenaki people. The original tribe name listed on the Vermont Act, Sec. 1. 1 V.S.A. § 855 for state recognition is Koasek Abenaki of the Koas Abenaki Nation. Their current name given on their website is Koasek Traditional Band of the Koas Abenaki Nation. Their current symbol has been updated, see their website.

They are not federally recognized as a Native American tribe. Vermont does not have any federally recognized Native American tribes. The Abenaki First Nations at Odanak and Wôlinak in Québec regard this band as a fraudulent Abenaki organization.

Their website (as of 26 Sep 2026) does not name their chief or leaders. Paul "Gwilawato" Bunnell has been known to be the chief.

This organization should not be confused with the Ko'asek (Co'wasuck) Traditional Band of the Sovereign Abenaki Nation, an unrecognized organization based in New Hampshire, or the many other groups who use the term Cowasuck.

== Name ==
The term Koasek is an Abenaki language term that translates as "young pine tree." Another version of the word, Cowasuck, was applied to a brook that was a tributary to the Sudbury River in Massachusetts.

== State recognition ==
Vermont recognized the Koasek Abenaki Tribe as in 2012. The other state-recognized tribes in Vermont are the Nulhegan Band of the Coosuk Abenaki Nation, Elnu Abenaki Tribe, and the Mississquoi Abenaki Tribe.

== Heritage ==
The Koasek Abenaki Tribe are one of four state-recognized tribes in Vermont. They had 60 members in 2016.

University of Ottawa professor Darryl Leroux's genealogical and historical research found that the members of this and the other three state-recognized tribes in Vermont were composed primarily of "French descendants who have used long-ago ancestry in New France to shift into an 'Abenaki' identity."

In 2002, the State of Vermont reported that the Abenaki people had migrated north to Quebec by the end of the 18th century.

== Activities ==
They participate in Abenaki Heritage Weekend, held at the Lake Champlain Maritime Museum in Vergennes, Vermont.

== 501(c)(3) corporation ==
The Koasek Traditional Band operates a 501(c)(3) named Koasek of Turtle Island, tex exempt issued April 2019 under category: Arts, Culture and Humanities / Museum, Museum Activities (NTEE). As of 26 Nov 2026, no financials have been filed.

=== Land Gift ===
In February 2021 the corporation accepted a gift of just over 11 acres of land on 252 Elm Street in Claremont, New Hampshire, which was accepted by Chief Paul “Gwilawato” Bunnell. The donors were Jeanne Kennedy and Rick Bascom. "Local couple Rick Bascom and Jeanne Kennedy decided to give the land to the tribe after seeing the racial strife play out following George Floyd’s death in Minneapolis last summer, Bunnell said. 'During all the turmoil last year they felt they wanted to give one of their pieces of property to native Americans,' Bunnell said. 'They looked me up, and here we are.'" The land will be used as a tribal center.

== Property tax ==
Vermont H.556, "An act relating to exempting property owned by Vermont-recognized Native American tribes from property tax," passed on April 20, 2022.

== Notable members ==
- Billy Kidd, former alpine ski racer
