= Elnu Abenaki Tribe =

State-recognized tribe in Vermont, United States

Elnu Abenaki Tribe Elnu Abenaki Incorporated
- Formation: 2020 (Elnu Abenaki Incorporated)
- Founded at: Brattleboro, Vermont
- Type: state-recognized tribe, nonprofit organizations
- Tax ID no.: EIN 84-3882521
- Legal status: arts, culture, and humanities nonprofit; charity
- Purpose: A23: Cultural, Ethnic Awareness
- Headquarters: Jamaica, Vermont
- Location: Brattleboro, Vermont, United States
- Members: 60 (2016)
- Official language: English
- Website: elnuabenakitribe.org

The Elnu Abenaki Tribe is a state-recognized tribe in Vermont, who claim descent from Abenaki people. They are not federally recognized as a Native American tribe. Vermont has no federally recognized tribes. They are the smallest of Vermont's four state-recognized tribes with 60 members in 2016. The Abenaki First Nations at Odanak and Wôlinak based in the province of Québec, whose traditional homeland Ndakina includes northern Massachusetts, Vermont, New Hampshire, Maine, and into Québec and the Maritimes and who regard it as a fraudulent organization.

== State recognition ==
Vermont recognized the Elnu Abenaki Tribe as a state-recognized tribe in 2011. The other state-recognized tribes in Vermont are the Nulhegan Band of the Coosuk Abenaki Nation, Koasek Abenaki Tribe, and the Mississquoi Abenaki Tribe.

== 501(c)(3) corporation ==
In 2020, the group created 'Elnu Abenaki Incorporated, a 501(c)(3) nonprofit organization, based in Brattleboro, Vermont. The catefory is Arts, Culture and Humanities / Cultural, Ethnic Awareness (NTEE) Their registered agent is Rich Holshuh.

The current officers (latest report filed 2025) are:

- Roger Sheehan, president
- James Taylor, vice-president
- Richard Holschuh, secretary/treasurer.

Tax Filings by year ^{9/26}
Year	Revenue	Expenses	Net Income	Net Assets	Comp: Pres	Comp: V-Pres	Comp: Sec/Tr
2025	$198,845	$138,068	$60,777	$714,055	$79,892	$0	$0
2024	$152,261	$146,469	$5,792	$656,340	$0	$0	$0
2023	$206,488	$174,037	$32,451	$650,529	$0	$0	$0
2022	$424,441	$6,211	$418,230	$434,268	$0	$0	$0

== Heritage ==
University of Ottawa associate professor Darryl Leroux's genealogical and historical research found that the members of this and the other three state-recognized tribes in Vermont were composed primarily of "French descendants who have used long-ago ancestry in New France to shift into an 'Abenaki' identity."

The State of Vermont reported in 2002 that the Abenaki people migrated north to Quebec at the end of the 18th century.

== Activities ==
They participate in Abenaki Heritage Weekend, held at the Lake Champlain Maritime Museum in Vergennes, Vermont.

== Property tax ==
Vermont H.556, "An act relating to exempting property owned by Vermont-recognized Native American tribes from property tax," passed on April 20, 2022.
