= Western Abenaki language =

Nearly extinct Algonquian language

Western Abenaki
- Abenaqui, Alnombak, Saint Francois, Western Abnaki
- Alnôbaôdwawôgan
- Native to: Canada, United States
- Region: Quebec, New Brunswick, Maine, Vermont, New Hampshire
- Ethnicity: Abenaki
- Native speakers: 14 (2007–2012)
- Language family: Algic: Algonquian; Eastern Algonquian; Abenaki; Western Abenaki
- Writing system: Latin script

Official status
- Official language in: Wabanaki Confederacy

Language codes
- ISO 639-3: abe
- Glottolog: west2630
- ELP: Western Abenaki
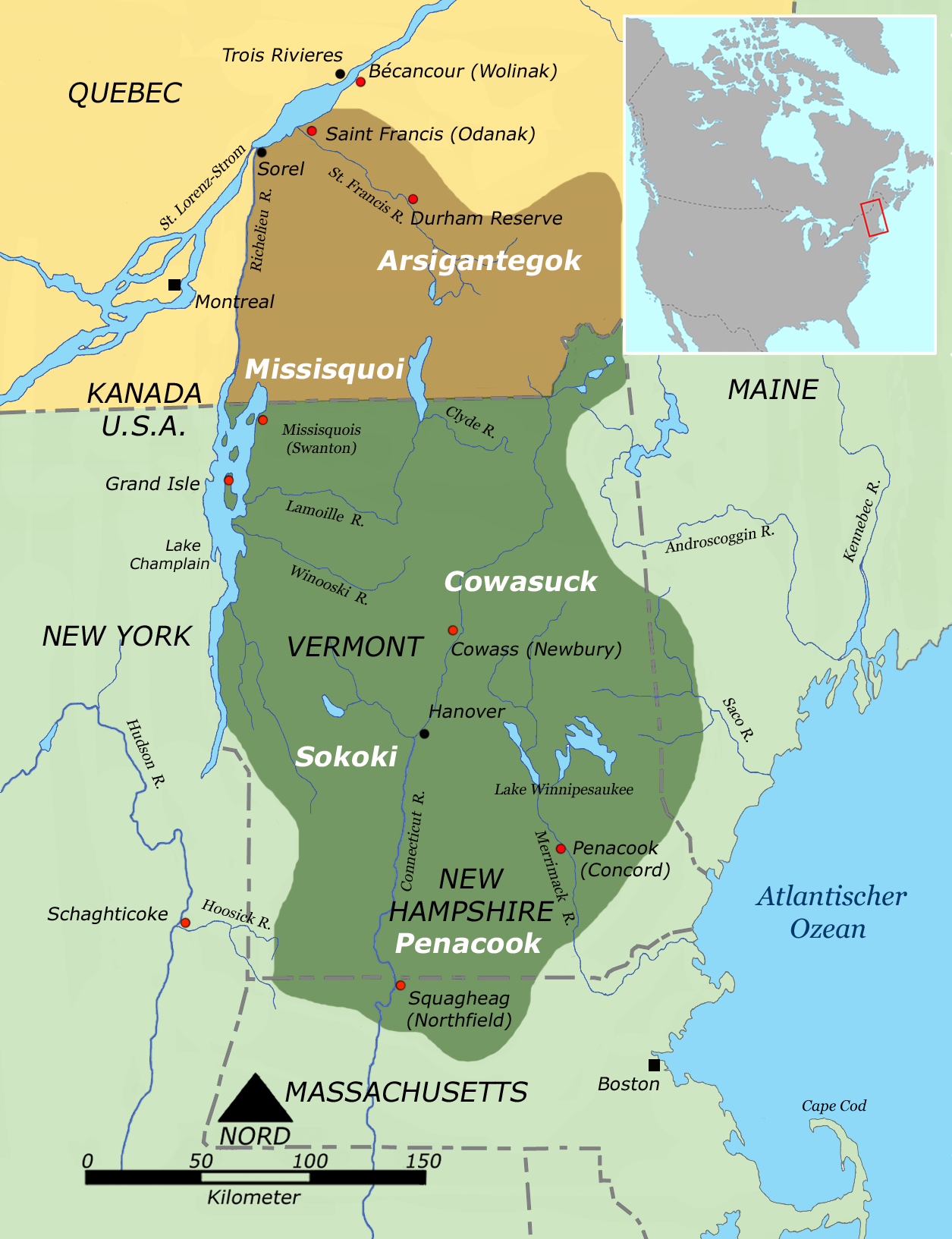
- Western Abenaki territory

- Western Abenaki is classified as critically endangered by the UNESCO Atlas of the World's Languages in Danger.

Western Abenaki is a nearly extinct Algonquian language spoken by the Abenaki people in New Hampshire, Vermont, north-western Massachusetts, and southern Quebec.

Odanak, Quebec is a First Nations reserve located near the Saint-François River. After the 1700s and arrival of English colonists, they called these peoples Saint Francis Indians, after the river in their territory.

In his book L8dwaw8gan Wji Abaznodakaw8gan: The Language of Basket Making, fluent speaker Jesse Bruchac notes that Western Abenaki is a polysynthetic language. Abenaki consists of both dependent and independent grammar which addresses the gender of the speaker. Abenaki parts of speech include nouns, pronouns, verbs, and adjectives. The structure of the sentence or phrase varies depending on whether the noun is animate or inanimate.

The few remaining speakers of Western Abenaki live predominantly in Odanak. The last fully fluent speaker, Cécile (Wawanolett) Joubert, died in 2006. A revitalization effort was started in Odanak in 1994; however, as of 2004, younger generations are not learning the language. The remaining speakers are elderly, making Western Abenaki nearly extinct.

== Revitalization ==
As with most Indigenous languages, due to residential schooling and colonialism, and with the fading of generations, the number of speakers has declined. Abenaki had as few as twelve native speakers in 2015, but with recent focus and extra efforts in the Abenaki community, this number seems to be growing. Today, there are some passionate Abenaki, like Jeanne Brink, and non-Abenaki people who are trying to revitalize Abenaki culture, including their language and basket-making traditions. Currently, there are about 12,000 people of varying Abenaki heritage in the Canadian and New England regions. In Maine, there are about 3,000 Penobscot Native Americans, and this group is a large driving force of the language resurrection.

A new generation is actively preserving and revitalizing the language. The late Joseph Elie Joubert from the Odanak reservation and Bruchac, lead partial immersion classes in the language across the Northeastern United States. They have created several Abenaki books, audio, video, and web-based media to help others learn the language. Middlebury College in Vermont, in collaboration with Bruchac, opened its School of Abenaki in 2020, which offers a two-week immersion program in the summer.

In addition to Brink and others, Bruchac is a prominent voice in the Abenaki culture. He has written and published books in Abenaki, and served as a dialect/dialouge coach and composer for the National Geographic miniseries Saints & Strangers. The miniseries includes over an hour of dialouge in the Western Abenaki language and two hours of on-set actor training and filming.

Although written primarily in English, Aln8bak News helped to preserve the Western Abenaki language through the inclusion of Abenaki words and their translations. Aln8bak News was a quarterly newsletter that discussed cultural, historical, and contemporary information regarding the Cowasuck Band of the Pennacook Abenaki. It was started in 1993 by Paul Pouilot, Sagamo of the Cowasuck Band of the Pennacook Abenaki. The word Aln8bak/Alnôbak (pronounced /'al.nɔ̃.bak/) is often used as a synonym for Abenaki. Initially the newsletter was called Aln8ba8dwa National News (Aln8ba8dwa or Alnôbaôdwa means 'Speaking Abenaki'). Issues of the quarterly newsletter from 2003 to 2010 were published by the Cowasuck Band of the Pennacook Abenaki on their website. According to a statement made by the Band, after 2010, they stopped publishing the newsletter on their website due to a lack of financial support from online readers. Aln8bak News included community-related information such as updates on governance issues, notices of social events, and obituaries. The newsletter also included Band history, genealogy, language lessons, recipes, plant and animal studies, books reviews, and writings by Band members.

== Phonology ==
=== Vowels ===
	Front	Central	Back
Close	ɪ ~ i		o ~ ʊ
Mid	(e)	ə	o ~ ʊ
Open-mid			ɔ̃
Open		a ~ ɑ	

- /a/ is an open back unrounded vowel; before /m/ in a final syllable it becomes close to [u] in English 'goose'.
- /ə/ is a mid central vowel; pronounced like in the English word 'label'; occurs only in the middle of a word between consonants.
- /e/, pronounced like in the English word 'end', occurs in only three words, where it is the initial segment––enni 'which', enna 'who' and enigakw 'a spear'.
- /i/ is a lower-high front vowel; normally pronounced between the English words 'peat' and 'pit', it varies between the high front tense vowel [i] and the mid front lax vowel [e].
- /o/ is a higher mid-back vowel pronounced like in the English word 'poke'; however, some speakers pronounce it like [ʊ].
- /ɔ̃/ is a rounded nasal vowel.

Historically, it was common for speakers to drop /h/ between vowels and to drop /w/ before the nasal vowel [ɔ̃].

=== Consonants ===
Western Abenaki has 18 consonant sounds in total.

		Bilabial	Alveolar		Palatal	Velar		Glottal
		Bilabial	plain	sibilant	Palatal	plain	labial	Glottal
Nasal		m	n					
Plosive/ Affricate	voiceless	p	t	ts		k	kʷ	
Plosive/ Affricate	voiced	b	d	dz		g	gʷ	
Fricative	voiceless			s				h
Fricative	voiced			z				
Approximant			l		j		w	

In Western Abenaki there is a distinction between fortis consonants (always voiceless and aspirated) represented as [p, t, k, s, ts], and lenis consonants (voiced between resonants, voiceless in word-initial and word-final positions and before a fortis consonant, unaspirated but become aspirated when they close a strongly accented syllable, which includes all final syllables) represented as [b, d, g, z, dz]. The lenis consonants generally exist between vowels and at the end of words but rarely next to each other or at the beginning of words.

- /p/ is a bilabial stop, tense, voiceless, unaspirated, and long in all positions; it is similar to the combined sounds of English /p/ ending a word and beginning the next, like in 'stop payment'.
- /b/ is a lax bilabial stop; between [a, e, i, o, j, m, n, l] it is voiced and pronounced like in the English word 'habit'; beginning a word it is voiceless and pronounced like a weak English /p/ but unaspirated; at the end of a word it is voiceless and made long by the stress assigned on the final syllable.
- /t/ is a tense apico-alveolar stop that is always voiceless and long, longer than the English /t/, similarly to the Western Abenaki /p/.
- /d/ is a lax apico-alveolar stop that is voiced between resonants and pronounced like in English word 'body'; at the start of a word it is voiceless and pronounced like a weak English /t/ but unaspirated; at the end of a word is it voiceless and made long and tense by the stress assigned on the final syllable, pronounced like in English 'hit'.
- /k/ is a tense, dorso-velar stop, long, voiceless and unaspirated in all positions and pronounced like /k/ in English word 'score'.
- /g/ is a lax velar stop; between resonants is it pronounced like in English 'ago'; beginning a word it is pronounced like a weak unaspirated [k]; at the end of a word it is voiceless and made long and tense by the stress assigned on the final syllable, pronounced like English /k/ in 'score'.
- /ts/ is a tense apico-alveolar affricate that is voiceless in all positions and pronounced by most speakers like /ts/ in English 'hats'.
- /dz/ is an apico-alveolar affricate pronounced between resonants like the /dz/ in English word 'adze'; at the start of a word it is pronounced like /ts/ in the English word 'lets'; at the end of a word it is pronounced like the /ts/ in 'hats'.
  - Historically, Western Abenaki speakers varied in the ways they pronounced the alveolar affricate phonemes /ts/ and /dz/. More than half of the population pronounced them as [ts] and [dz] respectively, while the rest pronounced them as [ʃ] and [ʒ].
- /s/ is a tense alveolar fricative that is always voiceless and long, much like the English /s/ in all positions.
- /z/ is a lax alveolar fricative that is voiced, and between resonants is pronounced like English /z/; voiceless when it is at the beginning of a word, both voiceless and long when it is at the end of a word.
- /h/ occurs only before a vowel or /l/ and is pronounced like in English word 'heel', 'hat', or 'hit'; lax consonants before it become voiceless; when is it between vowels it is usually dropped by speakers in most words.
- /m/ is a bilabial nasal sonorant pronounced in all positions like English /m/.
- /n/ is an apico-alveolar sonorant pronounced in all positions like English /n/.
- /l/ is a lateral sonorant; it is pronounced with a lot of tongue tension and is influenced by the vowel which follows it, or, in syllable-final position, by the vowel that precedes it.
- /j/ is a high front non-syllabic with a similar sound to [i] but is pronounced before a vowel with greater tongue tension than [i].
- /w/ is a mid-back rounded non-syllabic with a similar sound to [o]; occurs before or after a vowel; at the end of a word after /k/ or /g/ it becomes a voiceless fricative.

=== Stress ===
Stress within words in Western Abenaki is based on an alternating stress rule:

- Stress is initially assigned to the final syllable and then to every other syllable from right to left. Yet this assignment skips the vowel /ə/ and falls to the next syllable, even if the nucleus of that syllable is also /ə/. In fact, the presence of the unstressed /ə/ results instead in a lengthening of the preceding consonant and the vowel is often deleted in writing and rapid speech.
- Personal prefixes ne-, ke-, we- are not stressed, thus in words containing these prefixes, the stress shift will not occur on the syllable to the right.

As of 2004, linguists are unsure if a minimum syllable count is present in order for a word to be stressed.

Stress within sentences:

- In a declarative sentence, the pitch goes from high-low.
- Questions have a low-high pitch at the end of the sentence, yet the entire sentence is generally said with a higher pitch.
- Stressed syllables that exist in the middle of a sentence tend to be pronounced at a standard pitch level.

When a word is pronounced on its own, its stressed final syllable is typically high pitched. However, this is not necessarily characteristic of the specific word, because as stated above, declarative sentences end on a low pitch.

== Orthography ==
There is not one Western Abenaki orthography that is generally accepted by linguists or Abenaki speakers, but speakers typically do understand the orthographies of Joseph Laurent and Henry Lorne Masta––Western Abenaki writers who taught the language at Odanak.

The following table compares Masta and Laurent's orthographies.

Phoneme	Allophone	Masta	Laurent
p	'p	ph	-
p	p	p	p / pp
b	p	p	p
b	b	p / b	b
t	't		
t	t	t / tt	t
d	t	t	t
d	d	t / d	d
k	'k	kh	
k	k	k / kk	k
g	k	k	k
g	g	k / g	g
s	's	sh	
s	s	s / ss	s
z	s	s	s
z	z	s / z	z
c	'c	ch	
c	c	c / ts	ch
j	c	c / ts	c
j	j	c / j / dz	j
m	m	m	m
n	n	n	n
h	h	h	h
w	w	w / u	w / u / '
l	l	l	l
l	'l	lh	hl
i (ɛ)	i (ɛ)	i	i
ə	ə	e	e / u
a	a	a	a
ɔ̃	ɔ̃	8	ô
o	o	o / w	o

== Morphology ==
The words of Western Abenaki are generally made up of a central core (the root) with affixes attached. Often a single word will translate to a phrase in English. The affixes themselves typically do not translate to just one word either. Western Abenaki utilizes both suffixes and prefixes, often in combination (prefix-...-suffix; ...-suffix -suffix; etc.). The affixes tend to be quite short compared to the root of the word. With these observations in mind, Western Abenaki can be considered a synthetic agglutinative language.

=== Nouns ===
Like all Algonquin languages, the animacy of nouns is important to distinguish in Western Abenaki. Animate nouns refer to animals, people, and other living or powerful things. Inanimate nouns refer to lifeless things. This is necessary to know because the animacy of a noun plays a large role in what form the endings of other words connected to them will take. However, some classifications are arbitrary. For example, the word zegweskimen 'raspberry' is animate while the word zata 'blueberry' is inanimate. So the animacy of certain nouns must be learned individually.

==== Noun plurality ====
The plural suffixes of both noun forms:

- Animate: -ak, -ik, -ok, -k
- Inanimate: -al, -il, -ol, -l

Each suffix is used according to the final sound of the noun:

- -ik after d, t; both -dik and -tik become -jik
- -il after g, k
- -ok, -ol after -gw, -kw and the w drops (also sometimes words ending in m or n)
- -k, -l after a, ô
- -ak, -al after other consonants and the vowels o, i

There are a few exceptions to these rules that have to be learned individually.

=== Pronouns ===
In most Western Abenaki sentences, pronouns are expressed as affixes attached to other words. However, separate words are sometimes used to emphasize the pronoun in use.

Pronoun	English	Term	Possessive Pronoun Affixes
nia	I, me	1st person singular	n- / nd-
kia	you (singular)	2nd person singular	k- / kd-
agma	he, she, him, her	3rd person singular	w- (o-) / wd-
niona	we, us (exclusive)	1st person plural exclusive	n- / nd- ... -na(w)
kiona	we, us (inclusive)	1st person plural inclusive	k- / kd- ... -na(w)
kiowô	you (plural)	2nd person plural	k- / kd- ... -(o)wô
agmôwô	they, them	3rd person plural	w- (o-) / wd- ... -(o)wô

The first person plural exclusive and inclusive pronouns are very important distinctions in Western Abenaki. The inclusive form means you are including the person you are talking to in the "we" or "us", while the exclusive form means you are excluding them from the "we" or "us".

The form of the possessive pronoun affix you must use depends on the sound next to it. The forms nd-, kd-, wd- are used if the word begins with a vowel. The w- forms become o- in front of consonants. If a k- form needs to be attached to a word that begins with g- or k-, they fuse into a single k- as the prefix. Possessive pronoun prefixes are written with an apostrophe before the word (as shown in examples below).

Note that /w/ is pronounced as /o/ when it appears at the beginning or end of a word before a consonant or between two consonants. It is sometimes written as ⟨o⟩ in these situations and is still considered a consonant.

Examples of the possessive pronoun affixes on an animate and inanimate noun:

		Possessed animate noun 'cow'	Possessed inanimate noun 'gun'
my		n'kaozem 'my cow'	n'paskhigan 'my gun'
thy		k'kaozem 'thy cow'	k'paskhigan 'thy gun'
his		w'kaozema 'his cow'	w'paskhigan 'his gun'
our	excl	n'kaozemna 'our cow'	n'paskhiganna 'our gun'
our	incl	k'kaozemna 'our cow'	k'paskhiganna 'our gun'
your		k'kaozemwô 'your cow'	k'paskiganowô 'your gun'
their		w'kaozemwô 'their cow'	w'paskhiganowô 'their gun'

=== Verbs ===
Two main verb distinctions in Western Abenaki are intransitive verbs and transitive verbs.

- Intransitive verbs only need one participant that is doing the action or has the quality, such as 'to run', 'to jump', or 'to be angry'. Western Abenaki examples are abi 'to sit' and aloka 'to work'.
- Transitive verbs need two participants: one doing the action (subject) and one being acted on (object), such as 'to hit', 'to see', 'to love'. Western Abenaki examples are namiha 'to see' and wawtam 'to understand something'.

In thinking about these two verb types along with Western Abenaki's distinction between animate and inanimate things, this results in a split of four different types of verbs in Western Abenaki (which is true of all Algonquian languages).

Transitivity and animacy in Western Abenaki
	Inanimate	Animate
Intransitive	wligen 'it is good'	nd’abi 'I sit'
Intransitive	gezabeda 'it is hot'	kd’aloka-ji 'you will work'
Transitive	giktawa 'to listen to someone'	agida 'to read'
Transitive	n’namiô 'I see him/her'	miji 'to eat'

=== Morphophonological processes ===
There are seven morphophonological processes in Western Abenaki. These processes are used to describe the changes to affixes that occur when they are combined in different ways.

- Vowel truncation –– the initial vowel of a suffix is deleted when it follows a vowel. The only exception is -wi followed by peripheral formatives, here the initial vowel of the suffix is not deleted.
- Final glide delegation –– suffix-final glide w is deleted after a vowel when the suffix is word-final.
- Vocalization –– glide w changes to a vowel o when the glide becomes the nucleus of a syllable due to affixation.
- Coalescence of aw+e –– the combination of aw+e results in a single vowel o or 8.
- Coalescence of aw+a –– the preterit -ob is created from the combination of aw+ab(ani).
- Coalescence of a+a –– long /a:/ becomes nasalized [ɔ̃] in some instances such as -ba+ab(ani).
- Coalescence of wV –– w coalescence that explains why the plural peripheral formative -ak occasionally becomes -ok.

== Syntax ==
In general, the sentence structure appears to be SOV (Subject-Object-Verb), but word order is largely free, being mainly dependent on pragmatic factors. While the verb phrase tends to not have a common, basic order, there are still complementizer phrases and inflectional phrases that are more clear. In Abenaki, there are no apparent complementizers, but it is assumed that wh-words (who, what, when, why) start complementizer phrases, while declarative sentences are assumed to be inflectional phrases.

=== Enclitic particles ===
Enclitic particles function in a syntactically interesting way. In Western Abenaki, there are ten enclitic particles.

=ahto 'probably'	=ka 'focus'
=akʷa 'they say, it is said'	=nawa 'then, therefore'
=ci 'future'	=pa 'conditional'
=hki 'contrast, focus'	=ta 'emphasis'
=hpəkʷa 'in fact'	=tahki 'but, however'

These are also known as 'second-position' clitics because they come after the first word within the complementizer phrase or inflectional phrase. However, clitics do not always simply follow the first word of a sentence. Clitics can also attach to clause-initial conjunctions, such as tta 'and', ni 'and then', and ala 'or' or to the word that follows the conjunction. A focused noun phrase sometimes appears between a conjunction and the word that could potentially host the clitic, in this case the clitic will not be attached to the conjunction, but to the word after the noun phrase. In general, though they may typically exist in the second word of the sentence, clitics are mainly clause dependent, and are situated according to what clauses are functioning in a sentence and where, according to conjunctions.

== Vocabulary ==
=== Numerals ===
Western Abenaki numerals
W. Abenaki	gloss
pazekw	one
nis	two
nas	three
iaw	four
nôlan	five
ngwedôz	six
tôbawôz	seven
nsôzek	eight
noliwi	nine
mdala	ten

=== Roots ===
A root is an element in a stem; it does not have lexical meaning like a stem does. In other words, a root is dependent on other pieces of meaning to create a word.

This list is just a handful of Western Abenaki roots. Roots attached to the front of a stem are written with a hyphen at the front (typically refer people or parts of the body), roots that are attached to the end of a stem are written with a hyphen at the end, and roots that constitute the only element of a stem are written without a hyphen.

Western Abenaki roots
W. Abenaki	English
adag-	dishonest, uncertain, unreliable
akika	sow, plant
alem-	continuing, going farther
aodi-	fight (as in 'battle', 'make war')
azow-	change, exchange, trade
basoj-	near in space or time
-beskwan	the back of the body
bid-	unintentional, accidental, by mistake
cegas-	ignite, kindle, burn
cik-	sweep
cow-	must, certain, need, want
dab-	enough
dok-	wake
-don	mouth
gata-	ready, prepared
gelo-	speak, talk
gwesi-	respect, honor
-ilalo	tongue
jajal-	incapable
-jat	sinew, tendon
jig-	let, allow
-kezen	shoe, moccasin
kwaji-	outside, outdoors
la	be true
lakann-	travel
legwas-	dream
lina-	seem, feel, appear like
mad-	bad
msk-	grass
nakwh-	sneeze
-nijôn	child
nsp-	with
odana	village
ômilka	smoke dry meat
-ôwigan	spine, backbone
pkwam-	ice
pôlôba-	proud, vain
segag-	vomit
skoôb-	wait and watch
spôz-	early, in the morning
tekwen-	arrest, make prisoner
-tôgan	Adam's apple
waja-	kiss
wazas-	slippery
wôgas	bear's den
-zegwes	mother-in-law
zowi	sour
zôkwta	exhaust, run out of

=== Place names ===
Western Abenaki place names
W. Abenaki	English
bitawabagwizibo	Lake Champlain River
masisoliantegw	Sorel River
masipskwbi	Missisquoi Bay
baliten	Burlington

=== Other words ===
Western Abenaki vocabulary
W. Abenaki	English
sanôba	man
phanem*	woman
kwai	hello (casual)
pahakwinôgwezian	hello; lit. you appear new to me (after long separations)

* letters in square brackets often lost in vowel syncope.

=== Loanwords ===
Due to French and English contact with Western Abenaki people in the 1640s and earlier, many loan words were quickly incorporated into Western Abenaki and have stayed for nearly four centuries. During the latter half of the 19th century, word borrowing increased due to many Western Abenaki people being in close contact with summer resorts in Vermont and New Hampshire, as well as continued contact with French-Canadians. Notably, plural English nouns were borrowed into Western Abenaki as a singular form that were then made plural by adding Abenaki plural endings. For example, the word oxen was borrowed as asken 'an ox' that was pluralized into aksenak. Similarly, the word potatoes was borrowed as badades 'potato' that was pluralized into badadesak.

== In popular culture ==
The 2015 National Geographic Channel miniseries Saints & Strangers told the story of the founding of Plymouth Plantation and the celebration of the "First Thanksgiving". It contained a considerable amount of dialogue in Western Abenaki. Several actors, including Tatanka Means (Hobbamock), and Raoul Trujillo (Massasoit) spoke the language exclusively throughout the series, and Kalani Qweypo (Squanto) spoke both Abenaki and English. Western Abenaki language teacher Jesse Bruchac of Ndakinna Education Center was hired as a language consultant on the film.

== Bibliography ==
- Bach, Emmon (2014). "Wôbanakiôdwawôgan: Sketch of Western Abenaki Grammar". Linguistics Department Faculty Publication Series. Amherst: University of Massachusetts. — this paper has been withdrawn
- Beach, Jesse (2004). The Morphology of Modern Western Abenaki (Thesis). Dartmouth College.
- Day, Gordon M. (1994a). Western Abenaki Dictionary. Vol. 1: Abenaki to English. Hull, QC: Canadian Museum of Civilization. ISBN 978-0-660-14024-7.
- Day, Gordon M. (1994b). Western Abenaki Dictionary. Vol. 2: English to Abenaki. Hull: Canadian Museum of Civilization. ISBN 978-0-660-14030-8.
- Harvey, Chris. "Abenaki". Language Geek.
- Heald, B. (2014). A History of the New Hampshire Abenaki. Charleston, SC: The History Press.
- Laurent, Joseph (2006) [1884, Quebec, Joseph Laurent]. New Familiar Abenakis. Vancouver: Global Language Press. ISBN 0-9738924-7-1.
- LeSourd, Philip S. (June 2011). "Enclitic Particles in Western Abenaki: The Syntax of Second Position". Anthropological Linguistics. 53 (2): 91–131. doi:10.1353/anl.2011.0009.
- LeSourd, Philip S. (July 2015). "Enclitic Particles in Western Abenaki: Form and Function". International Journal of American Linguistics. 81 (3): 301–335. doi:10.1086/681577. S2CID 141980112.
- Masta, Henry Lorne (2008) [1932; Victoriaville, QC; La Voix des Bois-Franes]. Abenaki Legends, Grammar and Place Names. Toronto: Global Language Press. ISBN 978-1-897367-18-6.
- Warne, Janet (1975). A historical phonology of Abenaki (MA thesis). McGill University.
