= Nulhegan Band of the Coosuk Abenaki Nation =

State-recognized tribe in Vermont, US

- Named after: Nulhegan River, Cowasuck people, Abenaki people
- Type: arts, culture, and humanities nonprofit; museum; charity
- Tax ID no.: EIN 84-1704125
- Location: Shelburne, Vermont, United States of America
- Members: 1,400
- Official language: English, New England French
- President: Don Stevens
- Subsidiaries: AHA "Abenaki Helping Abenaki"
- Website: abenakitribe.org

The Nulhegan Band of the Coosuk Abenaki Nation is a state-recognized tribe and nonprofit organization, called AHA "Abenaki Helping Abenaki", whose headquarters and land are based in Vermont. They are often referred to as the Nulhegan Abenaki Tribe or simply, Nulhegan.

The Nulhegan Band has approximately 1,400 members, most of whom reside in the Northeast Kingdom region of Vermont.

Vermont recognized the Nulhegan Band of the Coosuk Abenaki Nation in 2011. The Nulhegan are one of four state-recognized tribes in Vermont. They participate at the state level in many ways, including in the Vermont Commission of Native American Affairs.

They are not federally recognized as a Native American tribe. Vermont has no federally recognized tribes.

== Etymology ==
The Nulhegan Band of the Coosuk Abenaki Nation draws its name the Nulhegan River, a tributary to the Connecticut River and Nulhegan Basin near Brighton, Vermont. Its name means "the place of log traps." The band is also named for the Cowasuck people and Abenaki people, one of the tribes that inhabited a large portion of eastern Vermont and western New Hampshire.

== Leadership ==
Donald Stevens giving a presentation at Burlington's Fletcher Free Library.

The Nulhegan Abenaki government is made up of a Chief (Sogomo), who is nominated by the councils and decided by election. The current Sogomo of the Nulhegan is Chief Don Stevens.

The legislative branch includes an elected Tribal Council of 5-11 members from various families within the tribe.

The judicial branch is represented by the Council of Elders. "It is the responsibility of the Council of Elders to interpret the Nulhegan constitution during disputes where two or more parties acting on behalf of the tribe cannot agree and/or when allegations are filed. Tribal Elders are inducted through ceremony and remain Elders for life. They are responsible for preserving our culture."

The government manages the tribe's land, activities, and gatherings and interacts with the state of Vermont in official matters.

== 501(c)(3) corporations ==
=== AHA Abenaki Helping Abenaki Inc. ===
The Nulhegan Band founded a 501(c)(3) nonprofit organization called AHA "Abenaki Helping Abenaki" in 2006. In 2019, the Tides Foundation provided it with a grant of $50,000. The category for this nonprofit is given as Arts, Culture and Humanities / Museum, Museum Activities (NTEE)

Lucy Neel, based in Barton and Derby Line, Vermont, is the organization's registered agent.

The current officers (latest report filed 2025) are:

- Chief Donald Stevens, president
- Nicole St. Onge, treasurer
- Lucy Cannon-Neel, secretary.

Tax Filings by year ^{9/26}
Year	Revenue	Expenses	Net Income	Net Assets	Comp: Pres	Comp: Secy	Comp: Treas
2025	$593,356	$574,029	$19,327	$1,758,598	$130,753	$37,500	$0
2024	$740,886	$564,060	$176,826	$1,570,197	$90,015	$37,500	$2,400
2023	$1,350,118	$448,203	$901,915	$0	$90,015	$32,289	$7,200
2022	$487,858	$317,625	$170,233	$0	$86,099	$6,965	$3,709
2021	$279,990	$283,664	-$3,674	$0	$26,154	$0	$0
2020	$0	$0	$0	$1	$0	$0	$0

=== Nulhegan Band of the Coosuk Nation Inc. ===
Nulhegan Band of the Coosuk Nation Inc. was incorporated as a domestic nonprofit corporation on December 9, 2022, based out of Derby Line, Vermont. Lucy Neel is the organization's registered agent as well. The most recent filling (2025) was on 17 Aug 2026

== Land ==
In 2012, the Nulhegan Abenaki Tribe acquired some of the first tribal-owned and controlled land in Vermont for nearly 200 years. The 65 acres located in Barton VT where the tribal headquarters are, "will be an economic, educational and cultural resource for the tribe, which worked with the Vermont Land Trust and the Sierra Club to acquire the forestland."

350 acres of Wheelock VT land in the Northeast Kingdom were donated to the Nulhegan's non-profit Abenaki Helping Abenaki by Molly Davies in October 2023.

In July 2026, 270.5 acres of land in Cabot and Peacham, the former Covenant Hills camp, were given by the New England Conference of the United Methodist Church. The land was turned over to the Abenaki Helping Abenaki non-profit.

== State and Federal Laws ==
The Vermont Fish and Wildlife Department granted members of state-recognized Vermont tribes a free permanent fishing license, or if the applicant qualifies for a hunting license, a free permanent combination hunting and fishing license.

Vermont H.556, "An act relating to exempting property owned by Vermont-recognized Native American tribes from property tax," passed on April 20, 2022.

As a state-recognized tribe, the Nulhegan Abenaki may legal obtain eagle feathers and other animals parts of endangered animal species for usage but not sale.

== History ==
=== 20th-century eugenics survey effects ===
The Abenaki, along with French Canadians and other victims deemed "undesirable" were subject to eugenics practices occurring in Vermont during the 1920s and 1930s. Due to this, some Abenaki families hid their heritage. Chief Don Stevens of the Nulhegan said, "My grandmother was listed in the eugenics survey, which caused her to deny her heritage, and she wasn't able to be proud of that."

The Abenaki who chose to remain in the United States did not fare as well as their Canadian counterparts. Tribal connections were lost as those Abenaki who were tolerated by the Anglo population were assimilated into colonial society. What familial groups remained were often eradicated, in the early 20th century, through forced sterilization and pregnancy termination policies in Vermont. Official records list 253 recorded cases of sterilization, but some estimate there were over 3,400 cases of sterilization of Abenaki having been performed, many of which involved termination of an unborn fetus. No documentation of informed consent for these procedures was found. At the time, many of the children who were sterilized were not even aware of what the physicians had done to them. This was performed under the auspices of the Brandon School of the Feeble-Minded, and the Vermont Reform School. It was documented in the 1911 "Preliminary Report of the Committee of the Eugenic Section of the American Breeder's Association to Study and to Report on the Best Practical Means for Cutting Off the Defective Germ-Plasm in the Human Population."

In 2021, the State of Vermont and the University of Vermont both formally apologized and recognized its role in the eugenics surveys in a formal resolution.

== Federal Recognition attempts and State recognition ==
=== Federal recognition attempts of Vermont bands ===
During this time, many groups consisting of small families said they were now returning to their Abenaki heritage after having denied it for the first half of the 20th century. Other claimants to Abenaki heritage also emerged, including those who had never before claimed Abenaki ancestry. This included the Nulhegan, who began as a nonprofit organization. This caused tension between the European Americans claiming Abenaki status and the extant Abenaki First Nations in Canada, such as the Odanak First Nation who see the Vermont Abenaki as illegitimate due to their lack of Abenaki ancestry, and their lack of cultural continuity from any historic tribe.

On November 15, 1980, the first record of a repatriation and reburial of Abenaki remains in the United States took place in Vermont after a set of Abenaki remains were discovered at the Putney Historical Society in Putney, Vermont. Blackie Lampman and Richard Phillips asked Beverly Bolding to facilitate the repatriation.

In the final determination of the 2005 petition for federal recognition by a related state-recognized tribe, the St. Francis/Sokoki Band Abenakis of Vermont, the BIA states: "The details of this claimed process of living 'underground,' however, are not explained by the petitioner. Some of the available documentation indicates that some of the group's ancestors moved from various locations in Quebec, Canada, to the United States over the course of the 19th century, but the available evidence does not demonstrate that the petitioner or its claimed ancestors descended from the St. Francis Indians of Quebec, another Indian group in Canada, a Missisquoi Abenaki entity in Vermont, or any other Western Abenaki group or Indian entity from New England in existence before or after 1800. The available evidence indicates that no external observers from 1800 to 1975 described the petitioner or its claimed ancestors, or any group of Indians, as an Indian entity or a distinct Indian community in northwestern Vermont," referring to groups such as the Nulhegan and Ko'asek.

=== Vermont State recognition ===
The State of Vermont designated the Nulhegan Band of the Coosuk Abenaki Nation as a state-recognized tribe through Vermont Statutes Title 1, Section 854 in 2011. The other three state-recognized tribes in Vermont are the Missisquoi Abenaki Tribe, Elnu Abenaki Tribe, and the Koasek Abenaki Tribe. In 2006, The Vermont Legislature recognized the Abenaki as a "Minority Population" within the State of Vermont under Statute 853. This entitled the Abenaki protections as a disadvantaged race of people. However, since there were no recognized Abenaki Indian Tribes in Vermont, there were "legally" no Abenaki people under the law. On March 16, 2008, the Vermont Indigenous Alliance is formed by Elnu Abenaki Tribe, Koasek Abenaki Tribe, Missisquoi Abenaki Tribe with the purpose of unifying the tribes and pursuing official state-recognition from Vermont. Finally, on April 22, 2011, the Nulhegan was officially recognized by the State of Vermont as an Abenaki Indian Tribe.

In 2013, Wabanaagig TV from the Aboriginal Peoples Television Network in Canada produced the movie, The Vermont Abenaki: A struggle for recognition, which documents the struggle for Vermont State recognition and culminates with the celebration of state recognition.

From August 19 to 22, 2015, the annual Wabanaki Confederacy Conference was held in Shelburne, Vermont. This was the first and only time the Wabanaki Confederacy was hosted in Vermont.

=== New Hampshire recognition attempt ===
In New Hampshire, which has no state or federally recognized tribes, attempts have been made to begin recognition for the Nulhegan, but so far have failed. In 2023 Bill LSR 23-0685 (later House Bill 535) was put forward to recognize the Nulhegan Band of the Coosak Nation and to restructure the membership appointments to the New Hampshire Commission on Native American Affairs, but it did not pass. The controversy was covered by New Hampshire Public Radio.

== Heritage claims ==
The Nulhegan Band of the Coosuk Abenaki Nation identify as being Abenaki and Cowasuck.

=== Controversy ===
The unreliability of family stories or misinterpreted records from this era, have resulted in non-Abenaki believing they have Abenaki heritage when they do not.

In State v. Elliott, 1992, the Vermont Supreme Court ruled that all aboriginal title in Vermont was extinguished "by the increasing weight of history."

In 2002, the State of Vermont reported that the Abenaki people had migrated north to Quebec by the end of the 18th century.

In 2019, the leadership of the Odanak Abenaki Band Council, the governing body of the Abenaki First Nation at Odanak, denounced any groups claiming to be Abenaki in the United States. The legitimacy of groups such as the Nulhegan Band have been questioned due to claims that the root ancestors they claim were Abenaki were actually Europeans. Other root ancestors, though Native, have been found to not have been Abenaki.

University of Ottawa professor Darryl Leroux's genealogical and historical research found that the members of this and the other three state-recognized tribes in Vermont were primarily French descendants who have used long-ago ancestry in New France to shift into an 'Abenaki' identity. He presented his findings at the University of Vermont's forum, "Indigenous Belonging & Rights in the Northeast" in 2024 and at the Vermont State House in February 2025, "What if We Got it Wrong?"

== Activities ==
The Nulhegan Abenaki Tribe host multiple gatherings every year, including drumming events and an annual pow wow. The first is at the Winter Solstice in late December. The second is the annual Snow Snake Games held at the end of February or early March. The last and biggest gathering is the annual Nulheganaki gathering held every year at the end of August or beginning of September.

Vermont, unofficially in 2016 and officially in 2020, celebrated Indigenous Peoples Day instead of Columbus Day. The state did not want to celebrate Christopher Columbus, due to his role in the genocide of Indigenous peoples of the Americas. Celebrations of Indigenous heritage and culture are now held across the state. The Nulhegan Abenaki host "Indigenous People's Day Rock".

In 2020, Nulhegan Band launched the Abenaki Trails Project, which provides educational material about Abenaki historic sites beginning in West Hopkinton, New Hampshire.

The Nulhegan Band has spoken with Middlebury College regarding the college's land acknowledgment, which highlights the Western Abenaki.

== Notable people ==
- Jesse Bruchac, author and linguist
- Joseph Bruchac, author
