= Missisquoi Abenaki Tribe =

State-recognized tribe in Vermont, United States

Missisquoi Abenaki Tribe, Maquam Bay of Missisquoi, Inc.
- Named after: Missisquoi people, Abenaki people
- Formation: 2015
- Type: state-recognized tribe, nonprofit organizations
- Tax ID no.: EIN 47-3962858
- Legal status: mental health organization, substance abuse program, charity
- Purpose: F20: Alcohol, Drug, and Substance Abuse, Dependency Prevention and Treatment
- Location: Swanton, Vermont, United States
- Official language: English
- Chief: Brenda Gagne
- Revenue: $116,856 (2018)
- Expenses: $126,720 (2018)
- Funding: grants, contributions, program services
- Website: abenakination.com
- Formerly called: St. Francis/Sokoki Band of the Sovereign Republic of the Abenaki Nation of Missisquoi

The Missisquoi Abenaki Tribe (Abenaki: mazipskoiak or mazipskoik alnôbak) is one of four state-recognized tribes in Vermont, who claim descent from the Abenaki people. The Missisquoi Abenaki Tribe specifically claims descent from the Missiquoi people.

They are not federally recognized as a Native American tribe. Vermont has no federally recognized tribes. It is unrecognized by the Abenaki First Nations at Odanak and Wôlinak based in the province of Québec, whose traditional homeland Ndakina includes northern Massachusetts, Vermont, New Hampshire, Maine, and into Québec and the Maritimes.

The chief of the Missisquoi Abenaki Tribe is Brenda Perretta-Gagne.

== Name ==
The Missisquoi Abenaki Tribe is also known as the Abenaki Nation of Missisquoi. They have also gone by the name St. Francis-Sokoki Band of the Abenaki Nation of Missisquoi, the Abenaki Tribal Council of Missisquoi, and the St. Francis/Sokoki Band of the Sovereign Republic of the Abenaki Nation of Missisquoi.

Although they use "Nation" in their name, they are not a recognized tribe of the United States and have no nation to nation relations with the US or with the two Abenaki First Nations in Canada.

== State recognition ==
Vermont recognized the Missisquoi Abenaki Tribe as 2012. The other state-recognized tribes in Vermont are the Nulhegan Band of the Coosuk Abenaki Nation, Elnu Abenaki Tribe, and the Koasek Abenaki Tribe.

== 501(c)(3) corporations ==
=== Maquam Bay of Missisquoi, Inc. ===
In 2015, the group created Maquam Bay of Missisquoi, a 501(c)(3) nonprofit organization, based in Swanton, Vermont. Their registered agent is Richard Mendard. The category for the 501(3)(c): Mental Health, Crisis Intervention / Alcohol, Drug Abuse, Treatment Only (NTEE).

From the CauseIQ website in 2026, their mission is "To promote wellness in the Abenaki community through holistic approaches that integrate health, education, and the environment." The organization is run by Bob Richard and has served as board president.

The Maquam Bay of Missisquoi board of directors are (date not given without paywall fee - needs verified):

- April Lapan, treasurer
- Brian Barratt, director
- John Lavoie, director
- Holly Lafrance, director and secretary
- John Lavoie, secretary
- Chris Lafrance, director
- Cody Hemenway, director
- Arthur Blackhawk, director..

From 2025 Form 990, one officer is recorded: Nicole Perretta, president.

Maquam Bay of Missisquoi Tax Filings by Year
Year	Revenue	Expenses	Net Income	Net Assets	Exec Comp
2025	$179,741	$179,906	-$165	$224,220	$0
2024	$341,929	$343,120	-$1,191	$224,385	$0
2023	$383,587	$445,354	-$61,767	$225,576	$0
2022	$40,917	$45,362	-$4,445	$48,928	$0
2021	$176,694	$78,555	$98,139	$147,067	$0
2020	-				
2019	-				
2018	-				
2017	$96,289	$79,637	$16,652	$25,870	$0
2016	$38,795	$33,550	$5,245	$9,218	$0
2015	$8,299	$3,484	$4,815	$4,815	$0

=== Abenaki Self Help Association, Inc. (ASHAI) ===
The Abenaki Self Help Association predates state recognition. It was formed in 1976 with a mission to improve the socio-economic, educational, cultural andhousing conditions of Native Americans residing in Vermont. This was heavily funded through US Department of Labor grants. Through HUD, the ASHAI sponsored a housing project, "Abenaki Acres" and rental housing for about a dozen families. This housing initiative was sold to the Vermont State Housing Authority in 2011. They supported an annual Heritage Festival for the tribe and to connect with other tribes.

The ASHAI form 990 for 2013 describes the mission of the organization: "The Abenaki Self Help Association provides information, ourreach and technical assistance to Tribal Members who need help in obtaining necessities of life, such as food, energy and medical help. [ASHAI] provides information and technical assistance to tribal members in obtaining education and employment. This assistance was primarily related to the helping of participants in gaining experience in work related skills, career understanding, and job seeking skills such as resume writing and job interview skills. Additionally assistance was provided to participants to further their education."

They filed their last 990 form in 2018. Its operations and social-good works were folded into Maquam Bay of Missisquoi, Inc.

In November of 2021 the former federal grants director of the organization plead guilty to embezzling over $100,000 from Abenaki Self Help between 2015-2018. The director was in charge of overseeing a grant from the US Department of Labor. The organization was a service arm of the Abenaki Nation of Missisquoi, which worked to improve the socioeconimic and educational conditions of community members, per the tribe's website in 2021.

Abenaki Self Help: available Tax Filings
Year	Revenue	Expenses	Net Income	Net Assets	Exec Comp
2013	$179,172	$194,590	-$15,223	$253,505	$0
2012	see link				
2011	see link				
2010	see link				
2009	see link				
2008	-				
2007	-				
2006	-				
2005	-				
2004	$113,421	$110,942	$2,479	$174,588	$0

== Petitions for federal recognition ==
The Missisquoi Abenaki Tribe is the only Vermont state-recognized tribe to have petitioned for federal recognition.

Under the name St. Francis/Sokoki Band of Abenakis of Vermont, the group applied for federal recognition first in 1980, then 1992, and finally in 2007. Two of them were denied and one of them was withdrawn due to legal issues with the State of Vermont. The group applied for but was denied federal recognition as a Native American tribe in 2007. The summary of the proposed finding (PF) stated that "The SSA petitioner claims to have descended as a group mainly from a Western Abenaki Indian tribe, most specifically, the Missisquoi Indians" and went on to state: "However, the available evidence does not demonstrate that the petitioner or its claimed ancestors descended from the St. Francis Indians of Quebec, a Missiquoi Abenaki entity in Vermont, any other Western Abenaki group, or an Indian entity from New England or Canada. Instead, the PF concluded that the petitioner is a collection of individuals of claimed but undemonstrated Indian ancestry 'with little or no social or historical connection with each other before the early 1970's'...."

== Heritage ==
The Missisquoi Abenaki Tribe is one of four state-recognized tribes in Vermont. It had 60 members in 2016.

In 2002, the State of Vermont reported that the Abenaki people had migrated north to Quebec by the end of the 17th century. The Missisquoi Abenaki Tribe of Vermont claims descent from the historic Missisquoi band of Abenaki, that they did not all leave for Canada.

University of Ottawa associate professor Darryl Leroux's genealogical and historical research found that the members of this and the other three state-recognized tribes in Vermont were composed primarily of "French descendants who have used long-ago ancestry in New France to shift into an 'Abenaki' identity."

== Activities ==
The Missisquoi Abenaki Tribe participates in Abenaki Heritage Weekend, held at the Lake Champlain Maritime Museum in Vergennes, Vermont.

The Missisquoi Abenaki Tribe maintained a USDA food shelf for the local community and held a BIPOC COVID-19 vaccine clinic in 2021 during the COVID-19 pandemic.

== Property tax ==
Vermont H.556, "An act relating to exempting property owned by Vermont-recognized Native American tribes from property tax," passed on April 20, 2022.

== See also ==
- State v. Elliott, 616 A.2d 210 (Vt. 1992), Vermont Supreme Court decision

== Bibliography ==
- Leroux, Darryl (2019). Distorted Descent: White Claims to Indigenous Identity. Winnipeg: University of Manitoba Press. ISBN 978-0887558979.
