= State v. Elliott =

- Court: Vermont Supreme Court
- Full case name: State of Vermont v. Raleigh Elliott, et al.
- Decided: June 12, 1992
- Citation: 616 A.2d 210, 159 Vt. 102 (Vt. 1992)

Case history
- Subsequent actions: Reargument denied (Aug. 25, 1992), cert. denied, 507 U.S. 911 (1993)

Court membership
- Judges sitting: Allen, C.J., Gibson and Morse, JJ., and Albert W. Barney, C.J. (ret.) and Peck, J. (ret.), specially assigned

Case opinions
- Morse

State v. Elliott, 616 A.2d 210 (Vt. 1992), is a decision of the Vermont Supreme Court holding that all aboriginal title in Vermont was extinguished "by the increasing weight of history." The Vermont Supreme Court has clarified that its holding in Elliott applies to the entire state.

== Background ==
In 1987, the land claim became an issue in the Abenaki chief election between Homer St. Francis and Lester Lampman. Lampman advocated that the tribe take a more aggressive stance in pushing its claim to "all of Vermont as well as parts of New Hampshire, Massachusetts and Maine." St. Francis won the election.

On October 18, 1987, St. Francis organized a "fish-in" with 35 other tribal members on the Missisquoi River, conducted without licenses from the state.

Just prior to the district court's decision, Chief St. Francis withdrew the tribe's petition for federal recognition, saying: "We don't need a Government we don't recognize to tell us we exist."

== Prior history ==
The case arose in the aftermath two Vermont District Court decisions.

=== State v. Saint Francis (1989) ===
In State v. Saint Francis, on August 14, 1989, Judge Joseph J. Wolchik of the Vermont District Court in Franklin County, in a 96-page decision, held that the Abenaki were a tribe, retained aboriginal rights to hunt and fish, and therefore did not need to acquire fishing licenses from the state. Judge Wolchik held that the Abenaki's aboriginal area consisted of 500,000 acres in northwestern Vermont: Grand Isle County, most of Franklin County, and some of Chittenden and Orleans counties. Wolchik dismissed the charges against all but six of the defendants; he held that the remaining six were not tribal members.

In the aftermath of the decision, Chief St. Francis vowed to file a land claim "as soon as possible." By then, St. Francis estimated the tribe's claim area as "all of Vermont, all of New Hampshire, and parts of northern Massachusetts, western Maine, upstate New York and southern Quebec."

By September 12, 1990, several title insurance companies in Vermont attempted to amend their standard policy contracts (an action that requires approval from the state banking department) to exclude a potential Abenaki claim from coverage.

=== State v. Bellevue (1990) ===
In State v. Bellevue, on August 13, 1990, in another fishing rights case, Judge Edward Cashman of the Vermont District Court in Franklin County held that the Abenaki were not exempt from state criminal jurisdiction. Judge Cashman, unlike Judge Wolchik, held neither tribal status nor aboriginal fishing rights could exist in the absence of a federal treaty.

== Opinion ==
The Vermont Supreme Court reversed and remanded Judge Wolchik's decision.

The opinion's main legal innovation was holding that "[a]n historical event, although insufficient by itself to establish an extinguishment, may contribute to a finding of extinguishment when analyzed together with other events" and that "a century-long course of conduct may demonstrate extinguishment, even though the exact date on which Indian title is extinguished is difficult to determine."

The court concluded that "a series of historical events, beginning with the Wentworth Grants of 1763, and ending with Vermont's admission to the Union in 1791, extinguished the aboriginal rights claimed here."

== Reception ==
Legal commentary on the Elliott decision has been generally negative. According to Joseph William Singer, a professor at Harvard Law School:

[I]t defies both precedent and the longstanding policy of protecting Indian title to conclude that Congress, by the simple admission of Vermont to the Union, casually obliterated all Abenaki title in the State of Vermont, whether currently settled by non-Indians or inhabited by Abenakis.

Gene Bergman wrote in the American Indian Law Review:

Elliot misinterprets Abenaki/Vermont history during the period from 1763 to 1791. An honest account of history would not have found extinguishment under the traditional rules. Hence, to avoid this conclusion, the Vermont Court created a radical new test that undermines the United States Supreme Court's rules and purposes protecting aboriginal title. . . .
Essentially, the court changed the test from an examination of intent/purpose to a review of cumulative effects. Under this new test, a sovereign need not have known that the consequences of an act would eliminate aboriginal title. Therefore, if the sovereign unleashed forces which eventually frustrated Indian occupancy, Elliot would find extinguishment in that act. Elliot implicitly holds that the cumulative effects need not be manifested at the time of or near in time to the sovereign action. The functional result of Elliot is that courts will weigh the cumulative effects of a sovereign's action over a long time—say, 200 years. This removes the barrier prohibiting the light imputing of extinguishment. Elliot undermines the entire framework of aboriginal title law.

According to John Lowndes:

This controversial decision marks a clear departure from the longstanding aboriginal title doctrine expounded in the early nineteenth century by Chief Justice John Marshall and the United States Supreme Court. The Vermont court's decision not only breaks with the rule that a tribe must consent to extinguishment of its aboriginal title, but also rejects the requirement that the dominant sovereign must express its intent to extinguish title with a "plain and unambiguous action." The Vermont Supreme Court's holding that the "increasing weight of history" alone can terminate Indian title disposes of the rule of law, and replaces it with a selective reading of the conqueror's history.

== Aftermath ==
=== State recognition ===
Vermont extended state-recognition to the Abenaki in 2006. The original recognition act provided:

This chapter shall not be construed to recognize, create, extend, or form the basis of any right or claim to land or real estate in Vermont for the Abenaki people or any Abenaki individual and shall be construed to confer only those rights specifically described in this chapter.

The language was amended and re-codified in 2010:

Recognition of a Native American Indian tribe shall not be construed to create, extend, or form the basis of any right or claim to land or real estate in Vermont or right to conduct any gambling activities prohibited by law, but confers only those rights specifically described in this chapter.

The amendment bill also added the following language:

State-recognized Native American Indian tribes and their members will continue to be subject to all laws of the state, and recognition shall not be construed to create any basis or authority for tribes to establish or promote any form of prohibited gambling activity or to claim any interest in land or real estate in Vermont.

=== Federal recognition ===
The St. Francis/Sokoki Band of Abenakis of Vermont were denied federal recognition on July 2, 2007. The Department of Interior determined that the Abenaki failed to satisfy four of the seven criteria for federal recognition:

1. that external observers identify the group as an American Indian entity on a substantially continuous basis since 1900,
2. that a predominant portion of the group comprises a distinct community and has existed as a community from historical times until the present,
3. that the group has maintained political influence or authority over its members as an autonomous entity from historical times until the present, and
4. that the group's membership consist of individuals who descend from a historical Indian tribe or from historical Indian tribes that combined and functioned as a single autonomous political entity.
