= Wôlinak =

- First Nations reserve
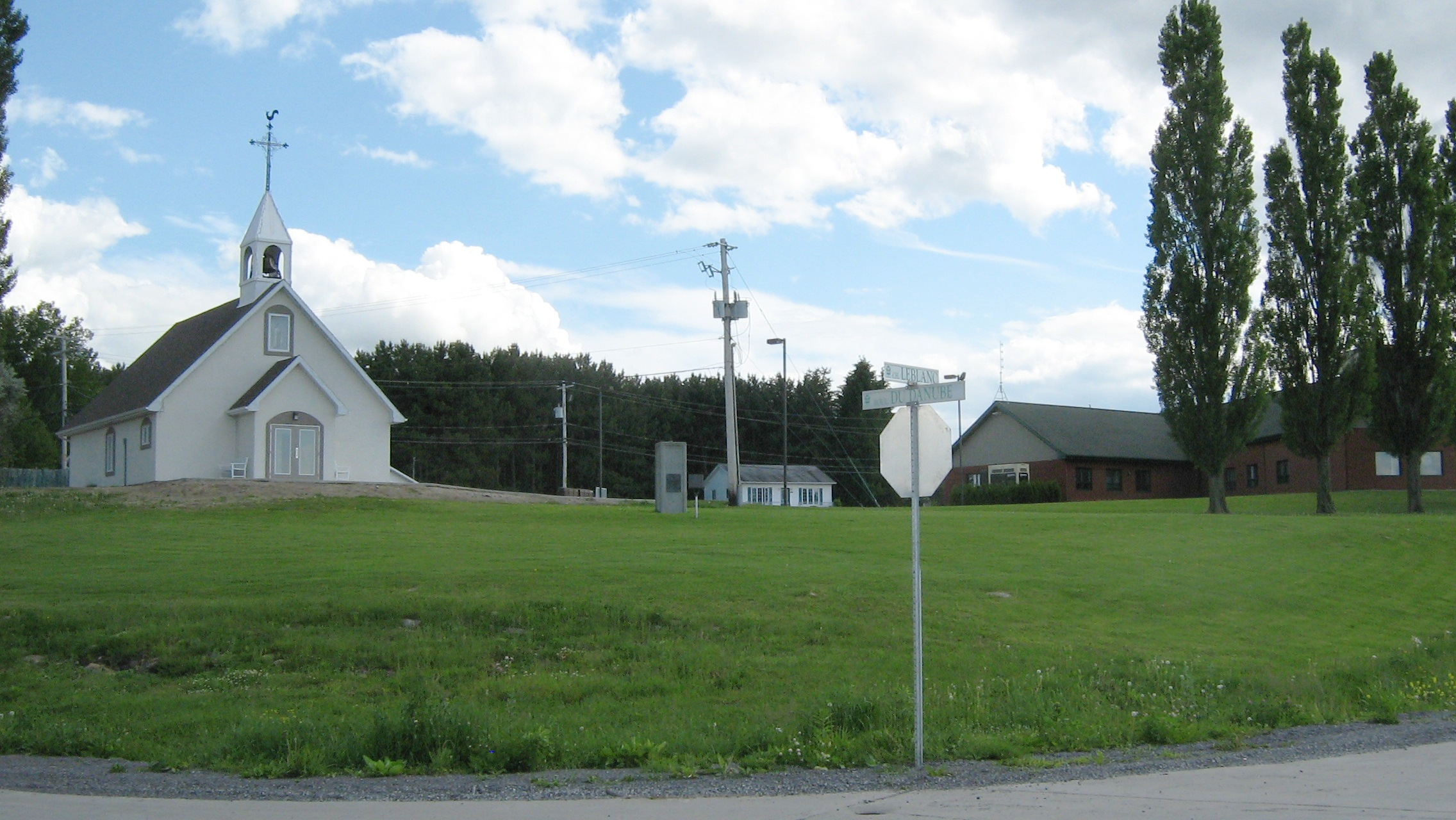
- Wôlinak village

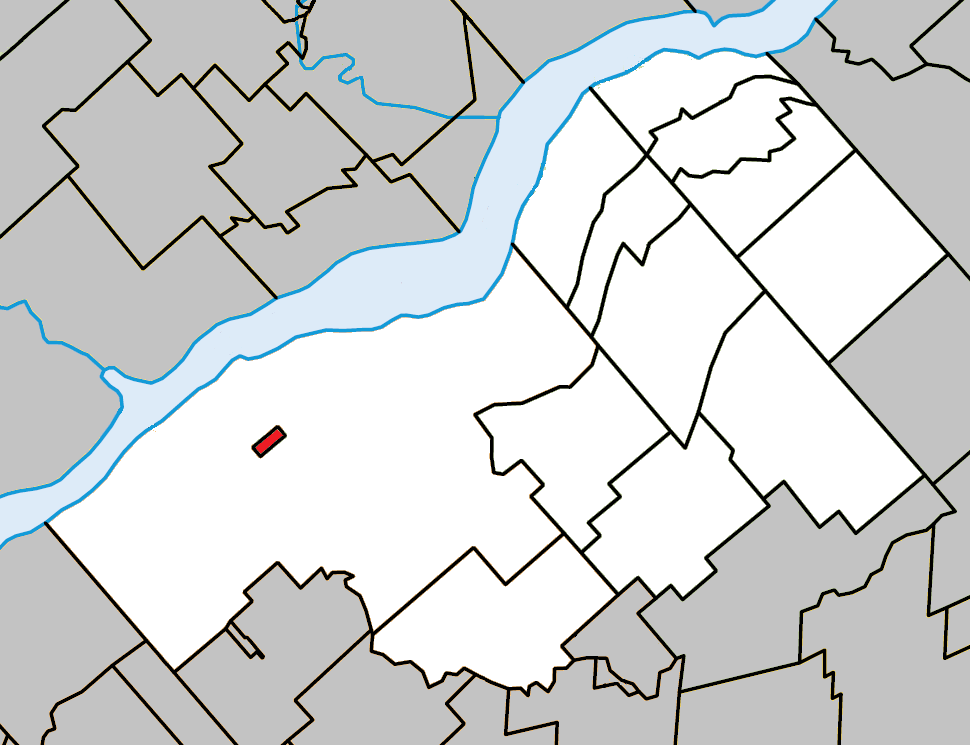
- Location within Bécancour RCM.

- Location in southern Quebec.
- Coordinates: 46°19′N 72°25′W
- Country: Canada
- Province: Quebec
- Region: Centre-du-Québec
- RCM: None
- Constituted: unspecified

Government
  - Type: Band council
  - Federal riding: Bécancour—Nicolet—Saurel—Alnôbak
  - Prov. riding: Nicolet-Bécancour

Area
  - Total: 0.80 km^{2} (0.31 sq mi)
  - Land: 0.74 km^{2} (0.29 sq mi)

Population (2021)
  - Total: 194
  - Density: 262.8/km^{2} (681/sq mi)
  - Pop 2016-2021: ▼4%
  - Dwellings: 106
- Time zone: UTC−5 (EST)
  - Summer (DST): UTC−4 (EDT)
- Area code: 450
- Highways: No major routes

Wôlinak is an Abenaki First Nations reserve in the Centre-du-Québec region, Quebec, Canada. An enclave within the city of Bécancour, it was one of the Seven Nations of Canada.

The Wôlinak Reserve covers an area of 80.4 hectares. It is located on lots 488, 489, 574, 580 (part), 581 (part), and 582 (part) of the parish of Notre Dame de la Nativité de Bécancour in the seigniory of Bécancour. The reserve is situated alongside the Bécancour River, 20 kilometres southeast of Trois-Rivières.

== History ==
Around 1600, a few Abenaki families and Sokokis families established themselves on the Puante river (name given after a battle with the English colonists against the French colonists) which later, was given the name of Bécancour River from the name of M. de Bécancour, Baron de Portneuf, who was also established there.

From 600 inhabitants in the beginning, their numbers diminished after wars and epidemics.

The Wôlinak Reserve is a First Nations reserve in Quebec, Canada, that covers an area of 80.4 hectares. It is located on lots 488, 489, 574, 580 (part), 581 (part), and 582 (part) of the parish of Notre Dame de la Nativité de Bécancour in the seigniory of Bécancour. The reserve is situated alongside the Bécancour River, 20 kilometres southeast of Trois-Rivières.

The land title history of the Wôlinak Reserve dates back to April 30, 1708, when Pierre Robineau donated a part of the Bécancour seigniory to the Abenakis. The overall area of land allotted to the different tribes residing in Lower Canada would not be more than 230,000 acres, as authorized by the 14-15 Victoria, chapter 106 (Statutes of Canada) on August 30, 1851.

On June 8, 1853, John Rolph, the Commissioner of Crown Lands, proposed a distribution list of lands set apart according to the 1851 Act, according to which the Indians of Bécancour were allotted an area of 2,000 acres. The distribution list submitted two months earlier was approved by the Governor General in Council on August 9, 1853.

On January 27, 1873, the cadastre of the Bécancour seigniory was developed, and lots 488, 489, 574, and 582 of the parish of Notre Dame de la Nativité de Bécancour were mentioned as belonging to the Abenakis, with an indicated area of 150.13 acres.

On November 17, 1913, the Government of Canada sold a portion of lot 582, parish of Notre Dame de la Nativité de Bécancour, measuring 13.23 acres to the Quebec, Montreal & Southern Railway Company for railway construction purposes. However, the government repurchased the land (portion of lot 582) on January 14, 1946, which had become the Canadian National Railway Company by then, and authorized its payment out of the Band's funds on May 29, 1946.

On January 18, 1972, the Government of Canada added the lands repurchased on January 14, 1946, to the territory of the Bécancour Indian Reserve through Order in Council 1972-28. The government also provided for the sale of a portion of lot 582 of the parish of Notre Dame de la Nativité de Bécancour, measuring 5.09 acres, to the Canadian National Railway Company through letters patent on April 28, 1972.

On September 19, 1972, the Government of Canada purchased a portion of lots 580 and 581 of the parish of Notre Dame de la Nativité de Bécancour from the Canadian National Railway Company, with an area mentioned as 27.71 acres. The lands purchased were added to the territory of the Bécancour Indian Reserve through Order in Council 1973-2946 on October 4, 1973.

On June 30, 1983, the Bécancour Indian Reserve changed its name to the "Wôlinak Indian Reserve." Today, the Wôlinak Reserve is home to the Abenaki First Nation, which has preserved its traditional way of life while embracing modernity.

== See also ==
- Odanak
- Western Abenaki
- Seven Nations of Canada
