= Abenaki language =

Algonquian language

Abenaki
- Geographic distribution: Quebec, New Brunswick, Maine, Vermont, New Hampshire; Canada, United States
- Ethnicity: 1,800 Abenaki and Penobscot (1982)
- Native speakers: <20 Western Abenaki (2025); Last known fluent native speaker of Eastern Abenaki died in 1993.
- Linguistic classification: Algic: Algonquian; Eastern Algonquian; Abenaki
- Subdivisions: Western; Eastern †

Language codes
- Glottolog: aben1250 Abenaki

- People: Alnôbak (Wôbanakiak)
- Language: Alnôbaôdwawôgan
- Country: Ndakinna; Wabanaki

Abenaki (Eastern: Alənαpαtəwéwαkan, Western: Alnôbaôdwawôgan) is an endangered Eastern Algonquian language of southern Quebec and the northeastern United States of New England, historically and traditionally spoken by the Abenaki populations. The language has Eastern and Western forms which differ in vocabulary and phonology and are sometimes considered distinct languages, while maintaining a degree of mutual intelligibility across a dialect continuum.

== Vocabulary ==
The English word skunk, attested in New England in the 1630s, is probably borrowed from the Abenaki seganku.
