= Gray Lock =

Western Abenaki warrior chieftain (1670–1750)

Chief Grey Lock
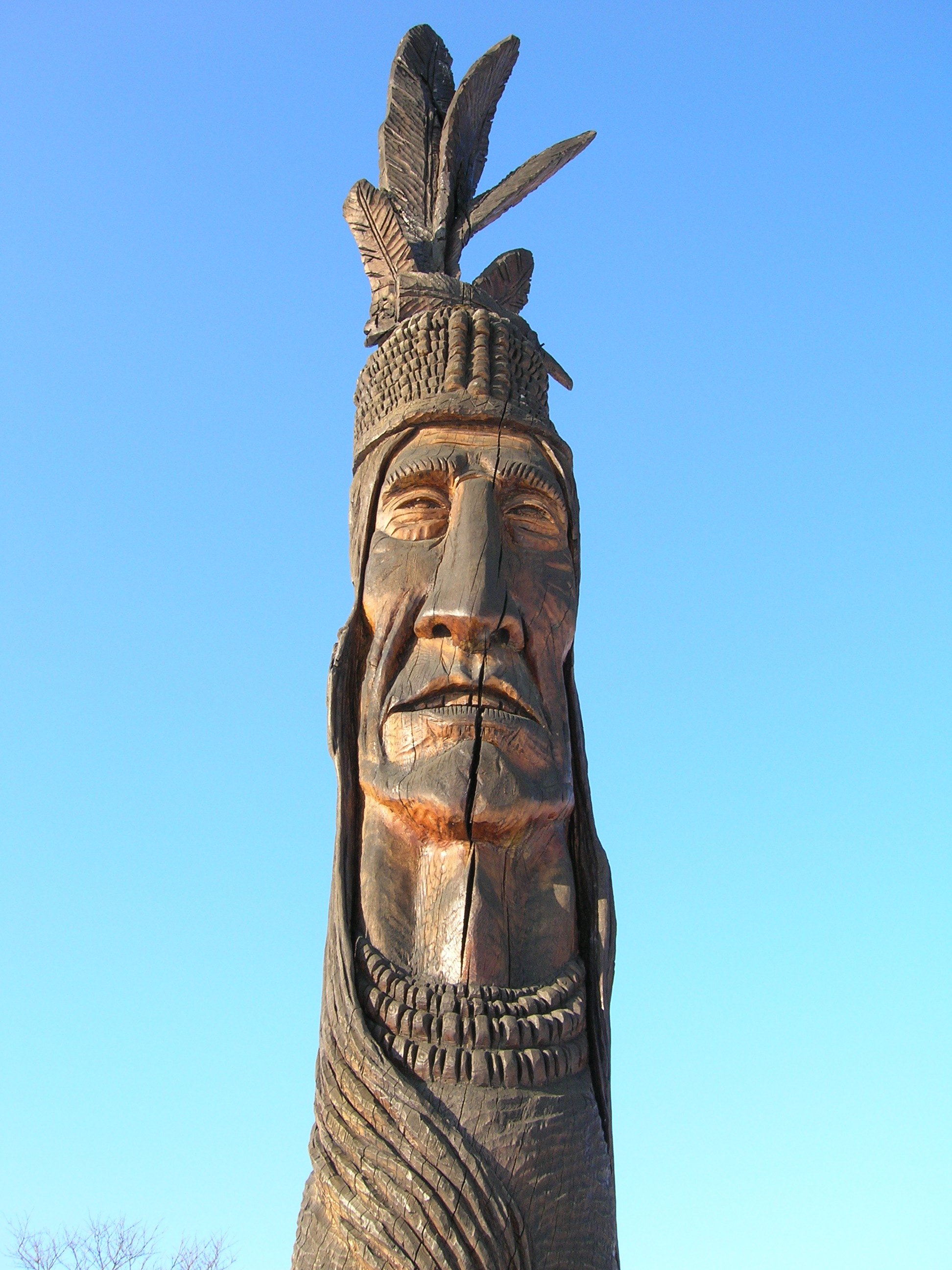
- Monument dedicated to Chief Grey Lock in Battery Park in Burlington, Vermont
- Born: Wawanotewat c. 1670; Near Westfield, Massachusetts
- Died: c. 1750
- Occupation: Indian chieftain

Chief Gray Lock (Grey Lock or Greylock, born Wawanotewat, Wawanolewat, or Wawanolet), (c. 1670 – c. 1750), was an Abenaki warrior chieftain of Woronoco/Pocumtuck ancestry who came to lead the Missisquoi Abenaki band. Born near what is now Westfield, Massachusetts, he eventually became the most illustrious and prominent leader to arise among the dwindling Waranoak, once the predominant original inhabitants of the central Connecticut River Valley in today's New England region.

== Dummer's War ==
The mid-1720s conflict known as Dummer's War (also known as Greylock's War, Three Years War, Lovewell's War, Father Rale's War, or the 4th Indian War) was a series of battles and raids between the region's English colonists and groups of the Wabanaki Confederacy. Chief Gray Lock rose to prominence during this period, marshaling and organizing Native resistance based along the lower Otter Creek and, further to the northwest, on the Missisquoi near today's Swanton, Vermont, both in what is now Vermont.

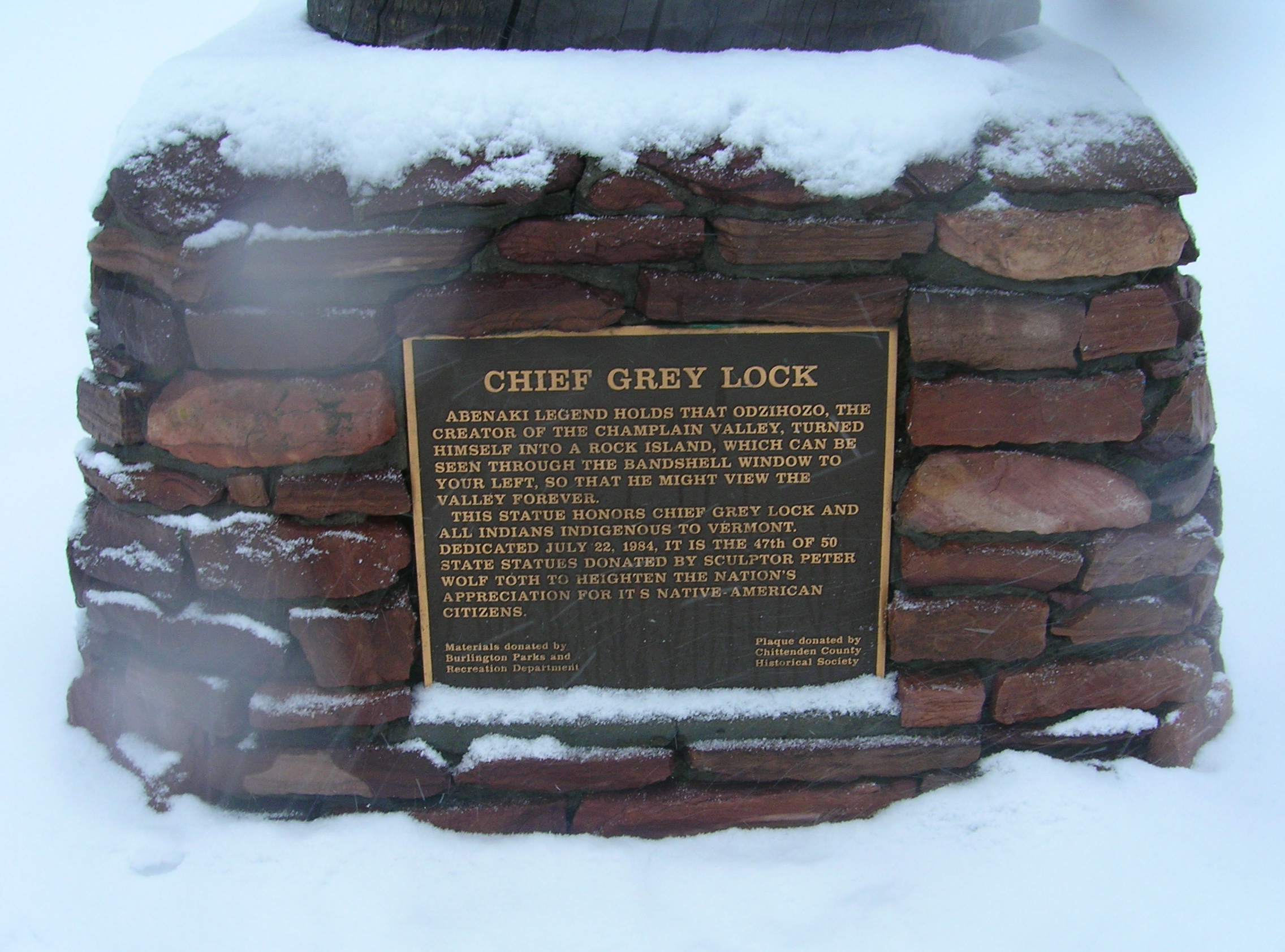
Tablet of the Chief Grey Lock monument, Battery Park (Burlington, Vermont)

French colonists and traders are recorded as the first Europeans to explore the Kennebec River area, in what is now Maine, with Samuel Champlain arriving in 1604 and claiming the area for France. Soon afterward, however, English colonists began to homestead lands along the Kennebec long occupied by the Abenaki people, who regarded them as their own. As the pattern of English colonial settlements in the area continued, the French and Abenaki formed an alliance against them.

The rising tensions erupted into open conflict in 1722. With the French, English colonists of the Province of New York, and the Iroquois looking on, Abenaki war parties commenced raiding the expanding English northern-tier colonial settlements of the Massachusetts Bay Colony, all the way from coastal Maine to Lake Champlain. Gray Lock rapidly distinguished himself as a pre-eminent Abenaki military leader, conducting frequent and successful guerrilla raids in areas of what are now southern Vermont and western Massachusetts. He consistently eluded his pursuers, acquiring among his peers the warrior's name of Wawanolet (v. Wawanolewat, Wawanotewat), which means roughly "he who fools the others, or puts someone off the track."

In August 1723, he led a war party which descended upon the English colonial settlements at Northfield and Rutland in Massachusetts escaping with captive settlers. The English colonial militia were mustered and put on high alert, but in October, Gray Lock once again attacked Northfield, escaping safely. With additional settler troops being raised and deployed as a result, early in 1724, by Massachusetts Bay Colony decree, a blockhouse known as Fort Dummer was erected by the colonists on the west bank of the Connecticut River about ten miles north of Northfield, immediately south of today's Brattleboro, Vermont, to help guard against future attacks. The colonial garrisons already established at Northfield, displacing the Abenaki from their traditional winter hunting grounds and camps, were strengthened as well.

The last of these settler parties withdrew from the field in March and April 1725, whereupon Gray Lock's contingent left their winter quarters, again throwing the settlements into a state of alarm. Intending reprisals, Captain Benjamin Wright set out in July for Missisquoi with a body of recruits, but having provisioned inadequately, aborted their mission and returned south. Gray Lock dogged Wright all the way to Northfield, with alarms and skirmishes continuing in and around Fort Dummer and Deerfield for the remainder of the summer months.

Eastern Abenaki groups made peace with Massachusetts in 1725 and 1726, and Abenaki bands in Canada agreed to peace terms in 1727, but Gray Lock refused, mounting sporadic raids on the colonies over the next two decades or so. The best available accounts indicate that Gray Lock died a free man around 1750, his name already a legend even among his enemies, and with family and stalwart followers around him.

== Legacy ==
Mount Greylock in Western Massachusetts is thought to have been named in tribute to chief Gray Lock. Although it is not clear whether chief Gray Lock was actually ever personally associated with this mountain, the name "Mount Greylock" first appeared in print around 1819, and came into popular use by the 1830s.

=== "Gray Lock" statue controversy ===
A statue and plaque were dedicated to Chief Gray Lock in Battery Park, Burlington, Vermont in 1984. The statue was designed by Peter Wolf Toth, a Hungarian immigrant who studied at Ohio State University. Toth was so moved by the stories of the indigenous nations that he wanted to create artwork honoring local indigenous people for each state in the US and province in Canada, calling his project the Trail of the Whispering Giants. While Toth meant his creations to be anonymous representations of the natives of the area, Vermont's state tribes asked this one to be named in honor of Gray Lock. The plaque (see image) attached to its base was entitled "Grey Lock" in his honor and it became universally known as such, and included some legendary and historic information.

By 2025 the wood of the statue had deteriorated to such an extent that it had to be removed for safety reasons. A gift was made by a state recognized tribe, the Abenaki Nation of Missisquoi, who members of the Abenaki First Nation at Odanak claim have no proven ties to the 17th and 18th century's historic Missiquoi people of Graylock. The historic Missisquoi were suffering from the Vermont settlers' encroachment onto their land and hunting grounds; renowned University of Ottawa scholar Gordon M. Day wrote that the historic Missisquoi quit the area by 1800. A Vermont artist was hired to create the replacement statue but the new, now commonly known as Gray Lock image on the front, was carved by a member of the state recognized band with their name and logotype. Descendants of Graylock (Wawanolet and Nolett family names) including General Director Daniel G. Nolett from Odanak along with local family members and allies, attended a meeting of the Burlington City Council resulting in a vote of 11–1 to not accept the proposed gift.

== Notable descendants ==
- Jean-Paul Nolet (born Wawanoloath)
- Alexis Wawanoloath , Canadian politician
- Christine Sioui-Wawanoloath , Canadian First Nations writer and artist
- Monique Sioui, indigenous rights activist
- Sophie Nolet, renowned basket maker and teacher, Odanak
- Danlel Gauthier Nolett, Directeur général/Kin8dokawawinno, Conseil des Abénakis d’Odanak

== Additional references ==
- The Western Abenakis of Vermont, 1600-1800: War, Migration, and the survival of an Indian people, by Colin G. Calloway (University of Oklahoma Press, 1990)
- The Original Vermonters: Native Inhabitants, Past and Present, by William A. Haviland and Marjory W. Power (University Press of New England, 1994)
- In Search of New England's Native Past: Selected Essays, by Gordon M. Day (Amherst: University of Massachusetts Press, 1998)
