= Metallak =

- Born: c.1727 or c.1750
- Died: February 1847
- Burial place: Stewartstown, New Hampshire
- Citizenship: Androscoggin
- Occupations: Hunter, guide
- Known for: last surviving member of the Androscoggin tribe
- Spouse: Oozalluc
- Children: 3

New Hampshire historical marker in Stewartstown

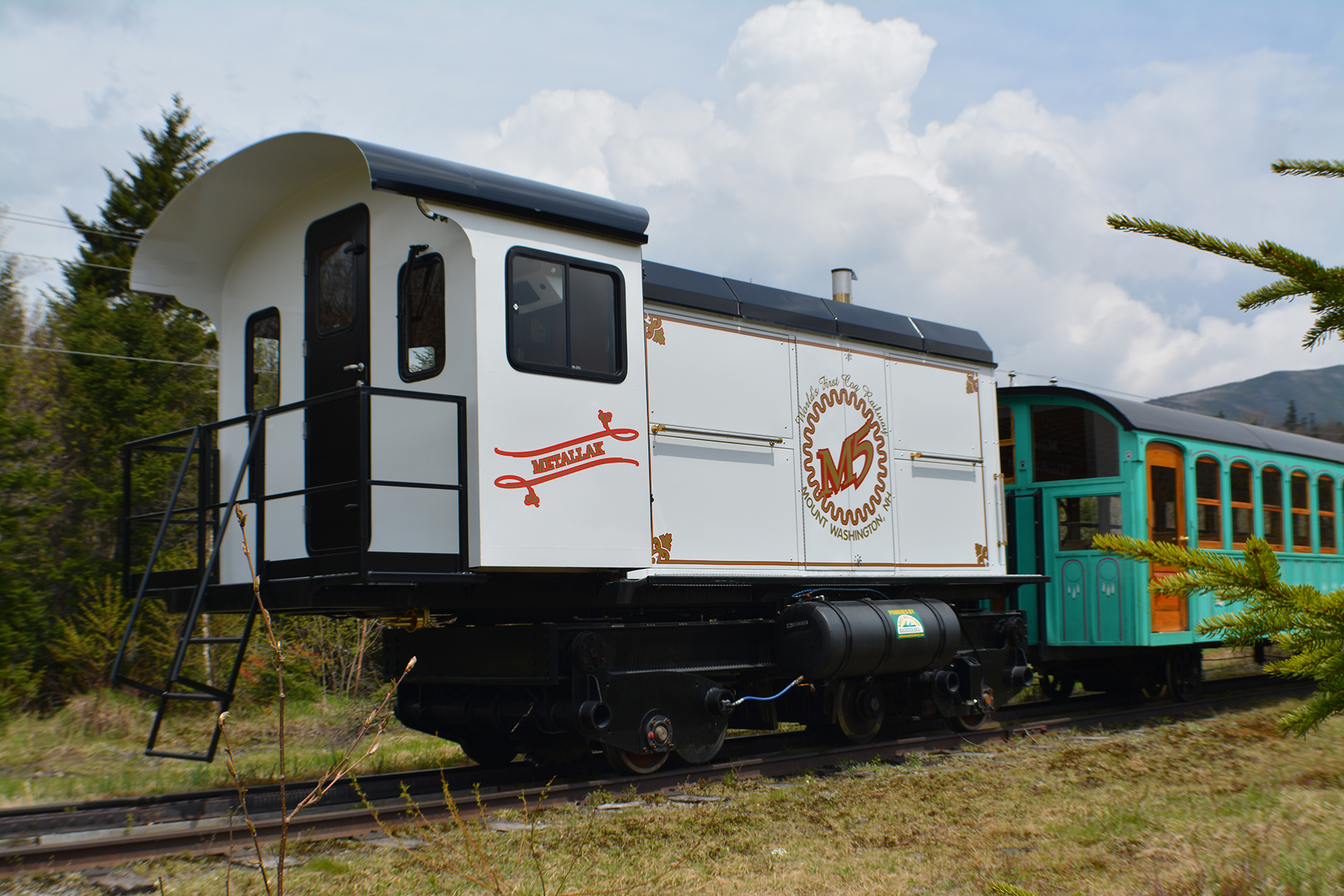
Metallak, biodiesel engine number 5, Mount Washington Cog Railway

Metallak (born c. 1727–1847) was a member of the band of Native Americans known as the Androscoggin, Cowasuck or, more properly, the Amascongan. The band, part of the Abenaki nation, inhabited the upper Androscoggin and Magalloway rivers along the northern border of New Hampshire and Maine. They also lived in the village of St. Francis in the Canadian province of Quebec. Metallak was, by at least one account, the youngest son of Piel, chief of the tribe. Note that this history naming Piel is controversial, put forth by the Nulhegan Band of the Coosuk Abenaki Nation, who are not recognized as kin/related community by the Abenaki First Nations of Odanak and Wôlinak.

Metallak was well known by early European settlers in the area and was on friendly terms with most of them according to local histories.

== Life ==
Metallak has been associated with Northern New Hampshire near Lake Umbagog. He, like Molly Ockett, lived in this area during years of encroachment and settlement by the English. Fact and myth are intertwined in the storytelling of Metallak. Neither the headstone (1850), erected by the village of Stewartstown, New Hampshire, nor the state historical marker on Route 145 (1847) agree on a date of death and neither give his birth. The two agree that he was “the Lone Indian of the Magalloway” which indicates he was of the Androscoggin band of Abenaki.^{:19} The date of death carved on his headstone is “about 1850,” and was erected by people of the community and other friends after his death. Local stories give his age at death as between 102 and 120 per Herbert.^{:19-20}

Like his place of birth the parents of Metallak are unknown.^{:11} ^{:20} According to Woodrow, “…it is thought by many that he was born in the Androscoggin valley,” possibly around 1727 or later. “History claims that in 1755 there were several hundred Indians living between Canton and Bethel. In that year they were visited by an epidemic of Small Pox …Their numbers were greatly decimated.” Around this time many Maine Abenaki retreated to Canada, some temporarily; it was a time of great danger and conflict, the early years of the French and Indian War.^{:11}

A captive narrative exists from Lieutenant Nathaniel Segar who was captured in Bethel, Maine, and taken to St. Francis after Tomhegan’s raid of this English settlement in 1781. Segar wrote, “When I got to Canada, I saw Metallak with the St. Francis Indians.” ^{:104} ^{:11} This indicates that Metallak was known to the inhabitants of early Bethel (formerly Sudbury, Canada).

As a hunter, trapper and fisherman, Metallak was a guide later in his life, accompanying many prominent men including Maine's Governor Enoch Lincoln.^{:104} He traveled regularly throughout the region, and it was his small family band who brought Molly Ockett to Andover at the time of her final illness in 1816.

In his memoir, Peter Smith Bean (1824-1911) remembered Metallak from when he was a young boy and Metallak was an old man; Peter said he was still “tall and straight” “an expert in woods craft” and “on very good terms with the Bean family” being invited to stay for meals when he was visiting the area. He had a camp on Lake Umbagog on what is known today as Metallak Point. The last time Bean saw Metallak was in 1833 when he came to his grandfather’s funeral where Metallak was much moved.^{:20} Bean has related how Metallak died:

“He went to his camp on the Magalloway. Afterward he fell and put out one of his eyes on a stub by his camp which caused the loss of both eyes. The neighbors went to the camp and found him helpless. They took him to Nat Bean’s and notified his daughter in Canada. She came with a team and took him back home with her. His daughter married a Frenchman and was well off. That is the last I ever saw of Metallak.”

Herbert offers a similar account with an alternate ending; he states that Metallak’s daughter Parmachenee (Parmachenne Lake located near Umbagog Lake is said to be named for her) came from Canada for Metallak but he was so unhappy being away from the land he loved that he hired a youth to bring him back. The story goes that the boy robbed Metallak and abandoned him; he was later found by two trappers who took him to Stewartstown where he lived a few more years as a public charge.^{:21} This closing of his life be it truth or legend speaks to “the noble Indian” myth surrounding Metallak's attachment to his land.

== Legacy ==
Metallak was married at least two times. The names of his children who are verified are sons Wilumpa [Antoine], a younger son Parmayillet [Pierre/Joseph], and daughter Parmachenee [Catherine]. Other persons surnamed Metallak or similar, including Mary Ann, are thought to be his children. About 1829 or 1830, these two sons went to Canada, but could not persuade Metallak to go with them. From that time, he made his home on the Upper Magalloway, most of time living alone.

Burial

Metallak is buried in Stewartstown, New Hampshire. On the gravestone is written "last of the Coashaukes". Along Route 145, a New Hampshire historical marker (number 47) notes his nearby gravesite. It reads:

"Hunter, trapper, fisherman and guide, well and favorably known by the region's early settlers. 'The Lone Indian of the Magalloway' was the last survivor of a band of Abnaki inhabiting the Upper Androscoggin. Blinded by accidents, Metallak died a town charge in 1847 at the reputed age of 120. He is buried in the North Hill Cemetery on road to the east."

His name survives in place names such as Metallak Island in Umbagog Lake and Richardson Lake, Metallak Pond, Metallak Brook, and two different Metallak Mountains, one in Maine and one in New Hampshire. A locomotive at the Mount Washington Cog Railway is also named after him. He was a friend of Governor Enoch Lincoln.

Various spellings of his name include Metalluc, Matalak, Metalak, Mettalak, Metalluk, and Netalluc.; Metallic and Natalluc ^{:104}; Mettalak, Metalluc, Matalak, Metalak ^{:20.} A few BMD records for his children include the name "Louis" as their father.
