= Prince William Sound College =

Public college in Valdez, Alaska, US

Coordinates: 61.1339°N 146.3560°W

- Established: 1978; 48 years ago
- President: Dennis Humphrey
- Students: c. 1,000
- Location: Valdez, Alaska
- Campus: Valdez, Alaska
- Colors: Blue & yellow
- Website: pwsc.alaska.edu

Prince William Sound College (formerly Prince William Sound Community College and also known as PWSC and P-DUB) is a college located at 303 Lowe St. in Valdez, Alaska. PWSC comprises one main campus in Valdez and extension campuses in Glennallen and Cordova. The college is part of the University of Alaska Anchorage under the aegis of the University of Alaska System.

PWSC serves approximately 44,000 sq. mi., about the area of Ohio. Around 1,000 local, rural, and out-of-state students attend the college either face-to-face, through ITV classrooms or via Blackboard. There is no out-of-state tuition.

== History ==
Dr. John Devens founded the college in 1978 with an endowment of $50,000 he requested from the City of Valdez. For fiscal year 2012, Valdez allocated $700,000 for the school.

Since 1989, the college has been housed in what was formerly Growden-Harrison Elementary School, built on the new Valdez town site soon after the 1964 Alaska earthquake. The three buildings in the dormitory complex were originally government housing. The college acquired them in 1977 for one dollar and fully renovated them in 2010.

PWSC instituted the Last Frontier Theatre Conference in 1993.

In 1998, Maxine Whitney donated a large collection of native artifacts to the college. The collection now resides in the Maxine & Jesse Whitney Museum, located on the PWSC campus.

In a cost-saving move, the University of Alaska Anchorage regents in 2014 requested the college drop its separate accreditation by the Northwest Commission of Colleges and Universities and come under UAA's accreditation. The commission approved the change in July, 2015. At the same time the college began the process of dropping "Community" from its name.

== Academic programs ==
=== Associate degrees ===
Associate of Arts (General Studies), AA

Industrial technology

Millwright, AAS
Oil Spill Response, AAS
Safety Management, AAS

Nursing, AAS* (requires additional clinical sequence)

Outdoor leadership (ODS), AAS

ODS Concentrations: Adventure Filmmaking, Adventure Tourism, & Expedition Specialist (Alpine or Aquatic)

*Offered in partnership with University of Alaska Anchorage (UAA) via distance
**Offered in partnership with University of Alaska Southeast (UAS) via distance

=== Certificates ===
Industrial Technology Certificates:

Oil Spill Response
Safety Management

=== Occupational endorsement ===
Millwright

=== Accreditation ===
PWSC is accredited by the Northwest Commission of Colleges and Universities.

=== Distinctive programs ===
The AAS degree in outdoor leadership is offered at Prince William Sound Community College in Valdez, Alaska, a campus within the University of Alaska system.

Valdez is known world-over for its epic backcountry skiing, amazing fishing, and as a premiere sea kayaking destination. Valdez has a grip of many lesser known treasures and activities. Valdez is small, remote, and surrounded by some of the most beautifully rugged wilderness in the world.

== Facilities ==
=== Campus ===
The main campus is located at 303 Lowe Street, in Valdez. There are numerous classrooms, a health and fitness center, student lounge, and a computer lab, as well as the Maxine and Jesse Whitney Museum, a collection of Native Alaskan artifacts. Historical photographs from the original Valdez town site taken by P.S. Hunt, who was a photographer working throughout Alaska in the early 1900s, are also on the main campus.

=== Residence halls ===
The residential complex in the 100 block of Pioneer Dr. comprises three newly remodeled buildings called Copper Basin Hall, Cordova Hall, and Valdez Hall, each named after one of the Prince William Sound campuses. Of particular interest is the large Whispering Giant wooden carving by Peter Wolf Toth. The halls are just over half a mile from the main campus.

The residence halls were completely renovated in 2010 and can house up to 44 students in 3-bedroom, 2-bedroom, 1-bedroom, and studio apartments. Each building has its own laundry room, and the dormitory complex includes a student lounge and computer lab.

=== Health and Fitness Center ===
The Health and Fitness Center has a variety of cardio and resistance equipment, free weights, and a variety of fitness classes. There are also other various pieces of equipment: stairs, body balls, jumping ropes, punching bag and boxing pads. The facility also has showers, lockers and towel service. The cardio areas also have cable TV.

The Sound Wellness Alliance Network (SWAN) contributes to a program that allows the Health & Fitness Center to loan out X-Country Skis and Snowshoes which can be used on the various trails and backcountry in Valdez.

=== Library ===
Located at 212 Fairbanks St., the Valdez Consortium Library serves both the Prince William Sound Community College and the community of Valdez. The library has three levels, with elevator access available to the downstairs. The main level is home to two Alaskan murals painted by local artists.

The online library catalog contains the combined holdings of the Valdez Consortium Library, University of Alaska Anchorage libraries and Anchorage Public Libraries. Services provided by the Valdez Consortium Library includes Public internet access with wireless, Inter Library Loan, access to database and articles, reference assistance, Listen Alaska (digital e-books and audio book collection), Mango Languages and more.

All students, staff, and faculty are eligible to receive library cards from the Valdez Consortium Library. PWSC ID cards also serve as library cards, and can be activated at the library.

=== The Whispering Giant ===
Located in front of the residence halls, the Whispering Giant Indian head is the 40th statue in the Trail of the Whispering Giants cycle created by Peter Wolf Toth and was completed in October 1981. This work was carved from a mammoth Sitka Spruce and stands 25 feet high. Toth returned to Valdez in 2007 and completed a restoration project of the Whispering Giant for conservation and to extend the longevity of the work.

== Student life ==
Clubs include Phi Theta Kappa, PWSC Student Government, and Archery Club.

The college is also host to various concerts and fundraisers.

== Last Frontier Theatre Conference ==
The Last Frontier Theatre Conference is an annual event started in 1993 hosted by PWSC in Valdez, Alaska. The two-week event centers around American Theatre with an emphasis on playwriting. The conference involves theatrical productions, panel discussions, symposia, and workshops.

The three basic parts of the Last Frontier Theatre Conference are the Play Lab, various workshops and panel discussions, and lastly, the evening performances. The evening shows comprise works from attendants both past and present and are performed by imported and Alaskan theatre companies.

Plays are submitted from playwrights, then selected plays are read by actors to audiences. After the reading, the play is critiqued by academics, theatre professionals and the viewers, thus allowing development and growth for those involved. Participants are given the opportunity to work and study under award-winning members of the theatre community.

Along with the Play Lab, some of the events include: The Fringe Festival, The Ten-Minute Play Slam, The Monologue Workshop, and Acting for Singers (co-produced with Anchorage Opera). On the closing day there is a gala dinner.

The Last Frontier Theatre Conference has received the Jerry Harper Service Award and annually awards the Sue Nims Distinguished Playwriting Award. Attendees have included August Wilson, John Guare, Arthur Miller, Horton Foote, Patricia Neal, Robert Anderson, Jean Stapleton and Terrence McNally.

== Maxine & Jesse Whitney Museum ==
Prince William Sound College is home to the Maxine & Jesse Whitney Museum. The museum houses one of the largest collections of Native Alaskan art and artifacts in the world.

Coming to Alaska in 1947, Maxine opened a gift shop. She traveled around the state to Native villages purchasing works directly from artists, basket weavers and furriers, to later be sold in her store; she continued to gather items into the 1980s. The Eskimo Museum in Fairbanks came under ownership of Maxine in 1969. Ms. Whitney donated her collection of art and artifacts to PWSC in 1998, and it now resides on the main campus.

Exhibits include masks, dolls, fur garments, various sizes of ivory and baleen with scrimshaw work. There are also Alaska wildlife mounts, including a moose and a polar bear; along with other exhibits on Alaska and its rich history. The Whitney Museum is open Memorial Day through Labor Day or by appointment during the winter months.

== Partnerships ==
=== Prince William Sound Science Center ===
Created in 1989, this non-profit research center fosters understanding of the ecosystems of Prince William Sound and the Copper River Delta. Education is done through outreach and research.

=== Sound Wellness Alliance Network ===
Sound Wellness Alliance Network (SWAN) is a network of community members committed to promoting healthy lifestyles to the citizens of Valdez. SWAN partnered with the PWSC Wellness Center to create the Ski For Free program. The Ski For Free program loans ski equipment to members of the Valdez community for free.
