= Chief Kno-Tah =

Statue by Peter Wolf Toth

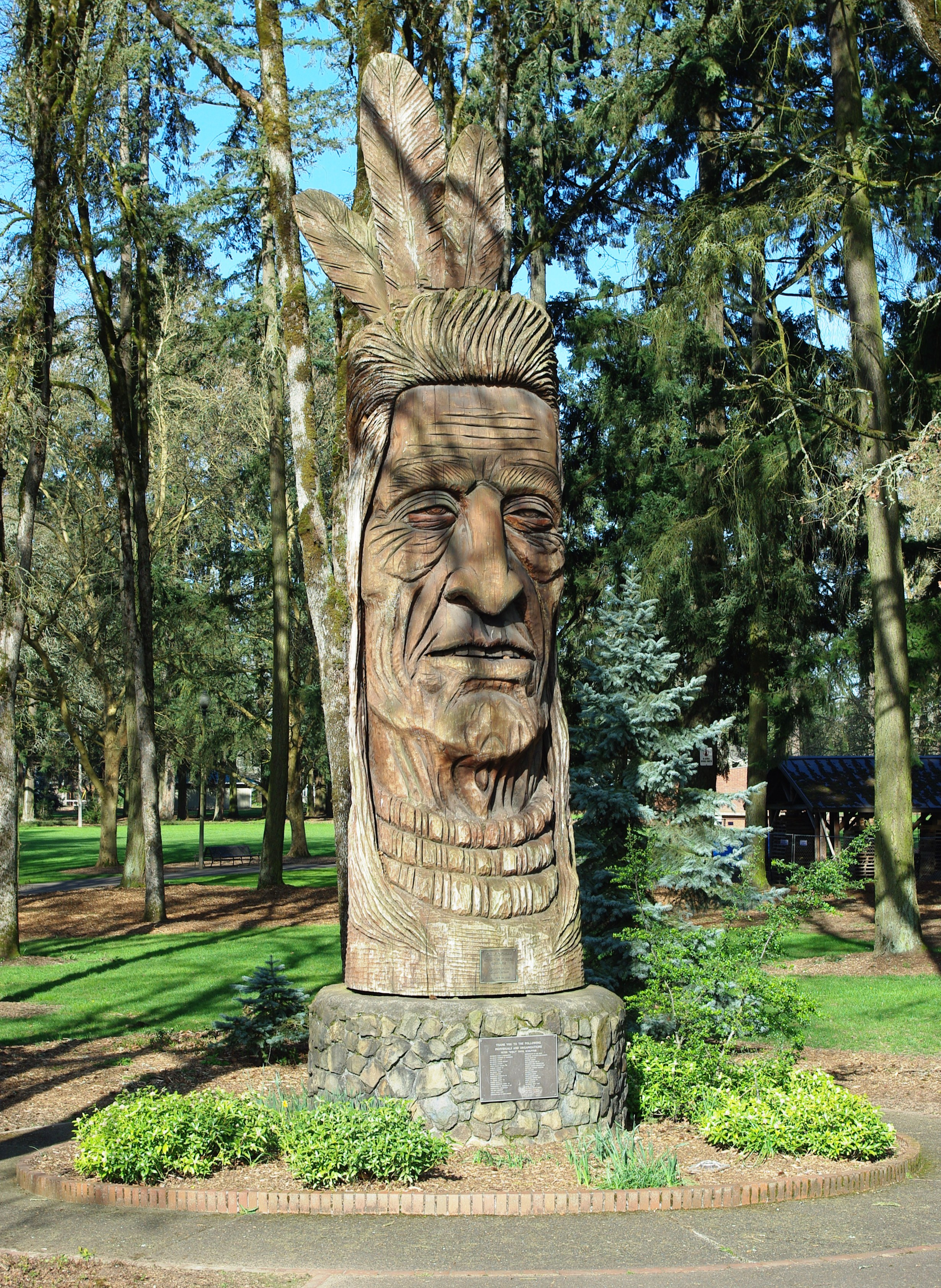
- The sculpture in 2010
- Artist: Peter Wolf Toth
- Year: 1987
- Type: Sculpture
- Medium: Wood
- Dimensions: 7.6 m (25 ft)
- Location: Hillsboro, Oregon, United States; 45°30′47″N 122°58′27″W

Chief Kno-Tah was a wooden statue located in Shute Park in Hillsboro in the U.S. state of Oregon. Carved by Peter Wolf Toth, it was the 56th Native American head in his Trail of the Whispering Giants series. The 25-foot (7.6 m) tall, 250,000-pound (110,000 kg) statue was the first of two carved by Toth in Oregon. Completed in 1987, the statue was named in honor of a chief of the local Atfalati tribe. In early 2017, the statue was damaged by a tree blown over in a windstorm. It was ultimately determined to be beyond repair and was removed in June 2017.

== History ==
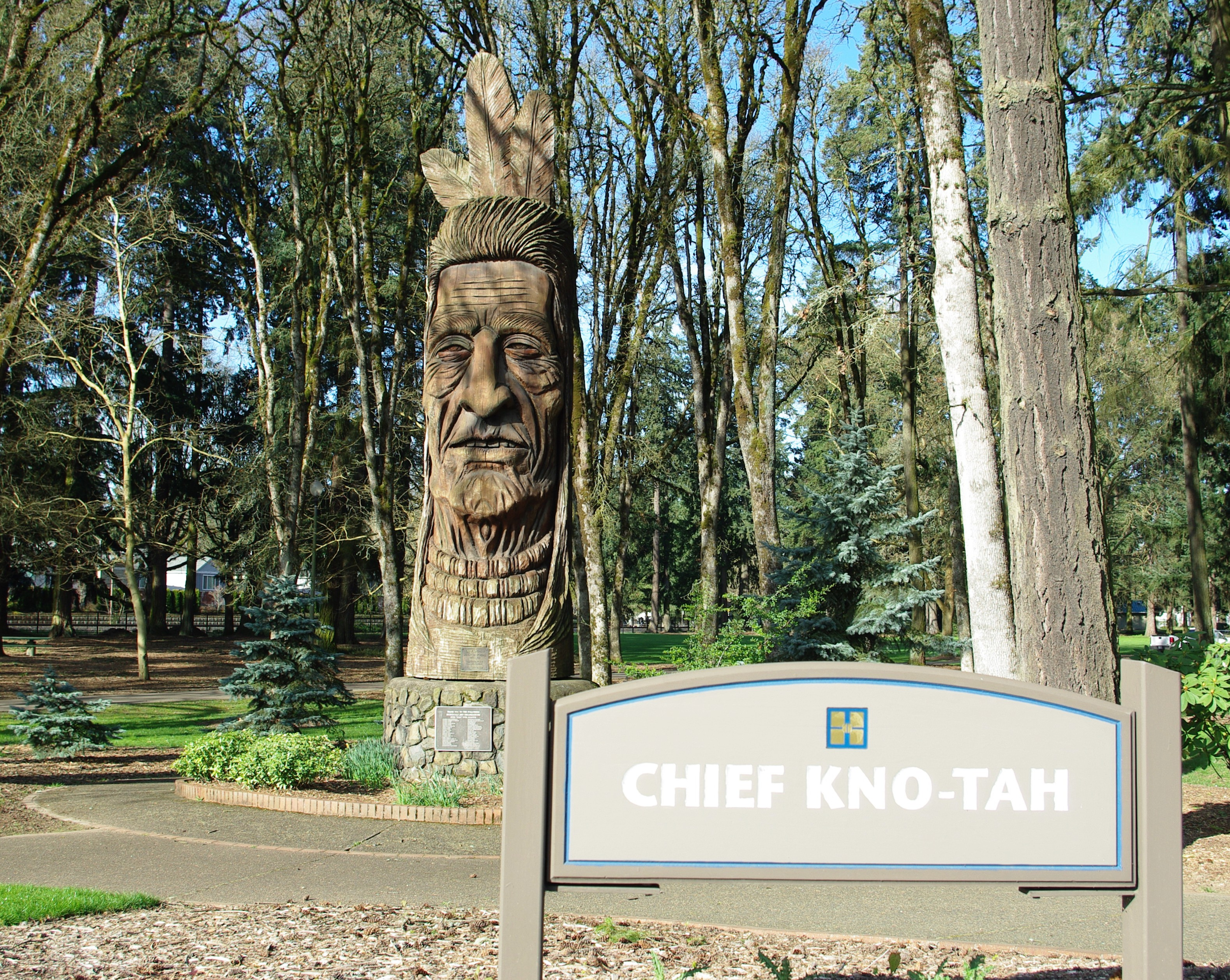
Front of the sculpture along with city park sign

Toth selected Shute Park in Hillsboro for his first sculpture of a Native American head in Oregon in July 1987. He wanted a location in the Portland metropolitan area to allow easy access for a large population to see the statue that would include features drawn from Chief Joseph of the Nez Perce tribe in northeastern Oregon. For his Trail of the Whispering Giants series, Toth carved a statue in each U.S. state with Oregon as the penultimate state. He began sculpting that month on a log of Douglas fir, Oregon's state tree. The 250,000-pound (110,000 kg) log was donated by Stimson Lumber Company and delivered free of charge by local companies.

On August 13, the partly carved log was lifted onto its base at the park along Tualatin Valley Highway by J. L. Craigg Construction. Toth carved it by hand, except for the use of an electric sander. The statue was later treated with wood preservatives and fiberglass was applied to the top to protect against the weather.

On September 25, 1987, the sculpture was dedicated as Chief Kno-Tah in a ceremony featuring Native American singing and dancing. About 400 attended the ceremony on a day proclaimed as United American Indian Day by Hillsboro mayor Shirley Huffman. City and county civic leaders as well as local Native American leaders spoke at the ceremony. Kno-Tah was the leader of the Tualatin band of the Kalapuya group, who signed a treaty in 1855 with the government to cede their ancestral home on the Tualatin Plains to pioneer settlers. Students at the Chemawa Indian School in Salem, Oregon, selected the name from submissions from local residents.

The 25-foot (7.6 m) tall statue was Toth's 56th in his series of Native American heads. Toth donated the statue to the state as he did with each in the series. A plaque on the base was later added. After completing the statue, he carved a second statue in Oregon in Astoria later that year to honor coastal tribes. Until 1996, a picture of the sculpture was used by the Hillsboro Chamber of Commerce for their postcards. In February 2017, the top of the carving was damaged when a wind storm blew an adjacent tree into the front side, shearing off part of the head and causing the entire statue to lean. By that point, the internal parts of the carving were decomposing, leading many to attempt to raise funds for bronzing the sculpture. On June 15, 2017, after officials deemed the leaning statue a safety concern, it was removed.

== Description ==
Chief Kno-Tah was made of Douglas fir and was 25 feet (7.6 m) tall, and 6 feet (1.8 m) in diameter (19 cubic metres, 9.9 tonnes). The concrete base was 2 feet (0.61 m) tall and 8 feet (2.4 m) in diameter. The figure featured braided hair with feathers protruding from the back.

== See also ==
- 1987 in art
- List of public art in Hillsboro, Oregon
- Native Americans in popular culture
