= George Floyd protests in Vermont =

2020 civil unrest after the murder of George Floyd

- Part of George Floyd protests
- Date: May 30 – June 7, 2020 (1 week and 1 day)
- Location: Vermont, United States
- Caused by: Police brutality; Institutional racism against African Americans; Reaction to the murder of George Floyd; Economic, racial and social inequality

This is a list of protests in the U.S. State of Vermont related to the murder of George Floyd.

== Locations ==
=== Bellows Falls ===
On June 5, about 300 people marched through the streets in support of Black Lives Matter and held a moment of silence for eight minutes and forty-six seconds to honor George Floyd.

=== Brattleboro ===
On May 30, hundreds of protesters lined Main Street "one end to the other" with many slogans and the names of African Americans killed by the police.

=== Burlington ===
On May 30, around 1,200 people protested in Battery Park and moved toward the Burlington Police Department.

=== Essex Junction ===
On June 5, a group of around 300 protesters gathered at Five Corners to honor George Floyd, with some taking a knee and others lying down on their stomachs with their hands behind their backs.

=== Middlebury ===
On May 30, roughly 375 people congregated on and around College Park and the Cross Street Bridge.

=== Montpelier ===
On May 30, hundreds of people protested at the intersection of State and Main Streets.

=== Newport ===
On June 7, around 100 protesters marched from the downtown police station to Gardner Memorial Park along Route 5 to protest police violence.

=== Rutland ===
On June 7, approximately 600 people came to Main Street Park for a youth-led peaceful gathering to protest racial injustice and police brutality.

=== St. Albans ===
On June 2, people protested at Taylor Park in St. Albans. One man was arrested.

=== St. Johnsbury ===
On June 3, four arrests were made during a protest where more than 100 people gathered in front of the St. Johnsbury Police Station.
