= Délegyháza =

- Coat of arms

- Location of Délegyháza in Hungary
- Coordinates: 47.25093°N 19.06126°E
- Country: Hungary
- Region: Central Hungary
- County: Pest
- Subregion: Ráckevei
- Rank: Village

Area
  - Total: 25.42 km^{2} (9.81 sq mi)

Population (1 January 2008)
  - Total: 2,994
  - Density: 117.8/km^{2} (305.1/sq mi)
- Time zone: UTC+1 (CET)
  - Summer (DST): UTC+2 (CEST)
- Postal code: 2337
- Area code: +36 24
- KSH code: 09973
- Website: www.delegyhaza.hu

Délegyháza is a village in Pest county, Budapest metropolitan area, Hungary. It has a population of 2,930 (2007).

Since 2008 the village is the site of a Trail of the Whispering Giants sculpture, the first of Peter Wolf Toth's sculptures located in Europe. It is located along the Danube River.
