= Battery Park (Burlington, Vermont) =

Public park in Burlington, Vermont, United States

Coordinates: 44.4810733°N 73.2199423°W

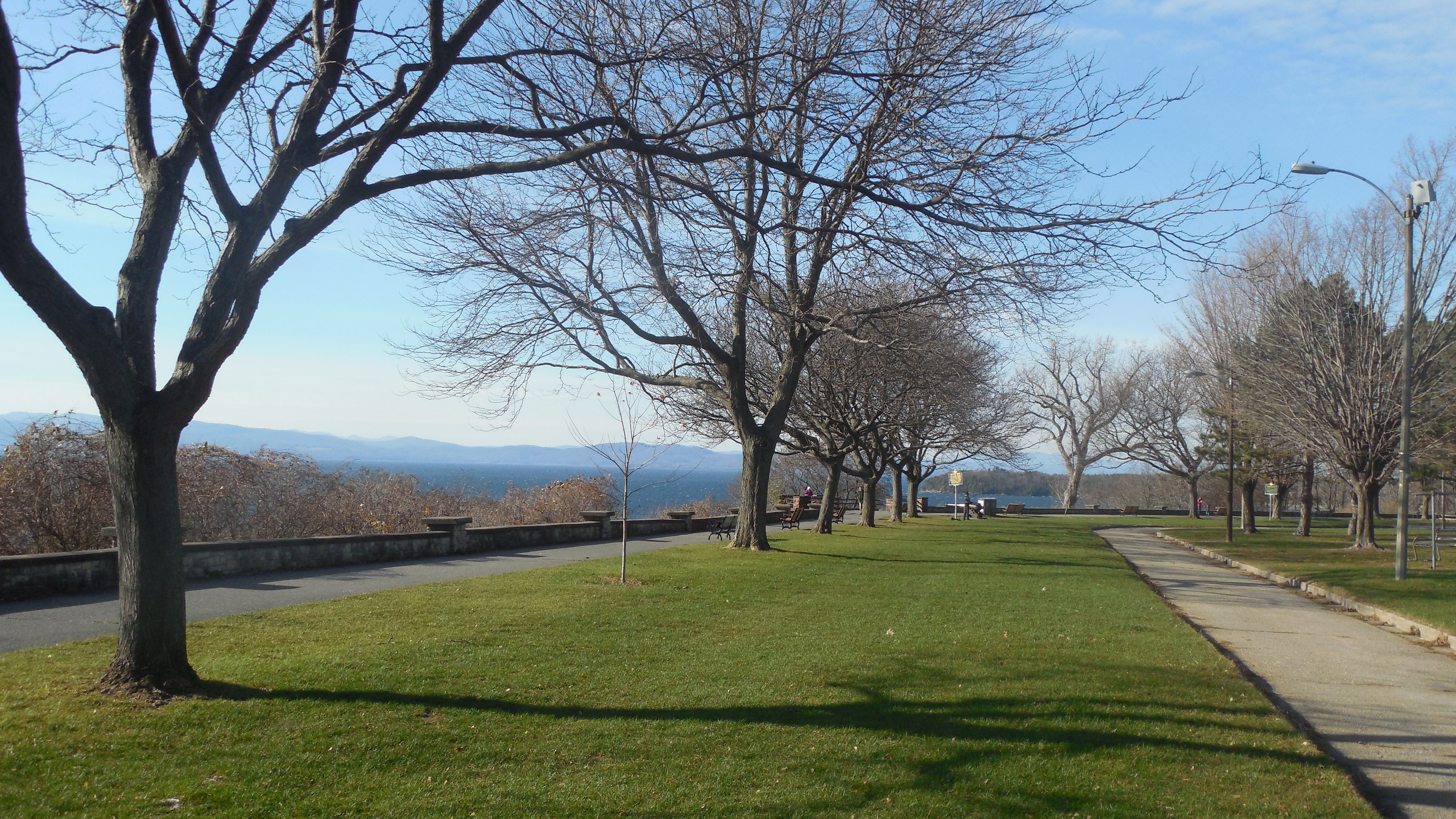
- Interactive map of Battery Park
- Location: Located at the top of Battery Street in downtown Burlington, Vermont
- Area: 14 acres (6 ha)
- Created: 1870
- Etymology: Built as a military camp during the War of 1812
- Operator: City of Burlington Parks, Recreation & Waterfront
- Website: http://enjoyburlington.com/venue/battery-park/

Battery Park is a public park overlooking Lake Champlain at the western end of downtown Burlington, Vermont. The park includes a bandshell, a playground, and various monuments, including a bronze statue of Civil War veteran General William W. Wells, and a red oak sculpture of Chief Gray Lock, a veteran of Gray Lock's War. Locally, it is popular for its wide, sweeping views of Lake Champlain.

== History ==
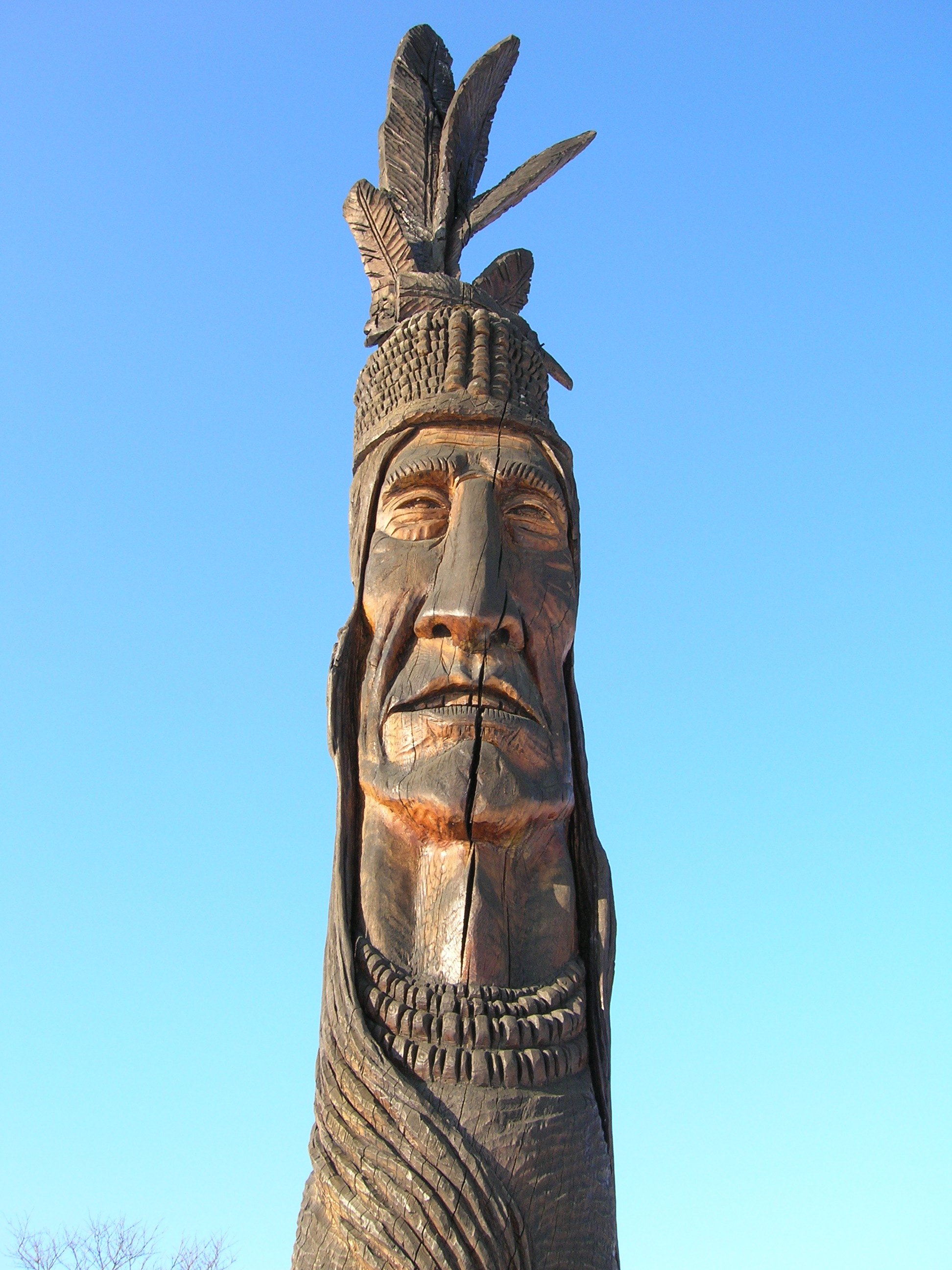
Monument to Gray Lock's War veteran Chief Gray Lock by Peter Wolf Toth.

Monument to American Civil War veteran General William W. Wells by J. Otto Schweizer.

The park was named for the artillery stationed there by American forces during the War of 1812. On August 13, 1813, American gunners, aided by the USS President, successfully defended their position against an attack by a British squadron led by Lt Colonel John Murray.

The park land was deeded to the City of Burlington in 1870, and the Battery Park Extension was added to the southern end in 1972.

== Trivia ==
- Because of its unobstructed view high above Burlingon's harbor, Battery Park is a very popular spot for observers of the Independence Day fireworks launched from a barge in the bay.
- According to noted author Rudyard Kipling (The Jungle Book), Battery Park has one of the two finest sunset views in the world, with the other location being Kenya's Ngong Hills.

== Links ==
- Vermont Department of Parks and Recreation
- President Lyndon B. Johnson's Remarks at Battery Park
- Battle at Burlington (1813)
