= Parmachenee Lake =

Lake in Maine, United States

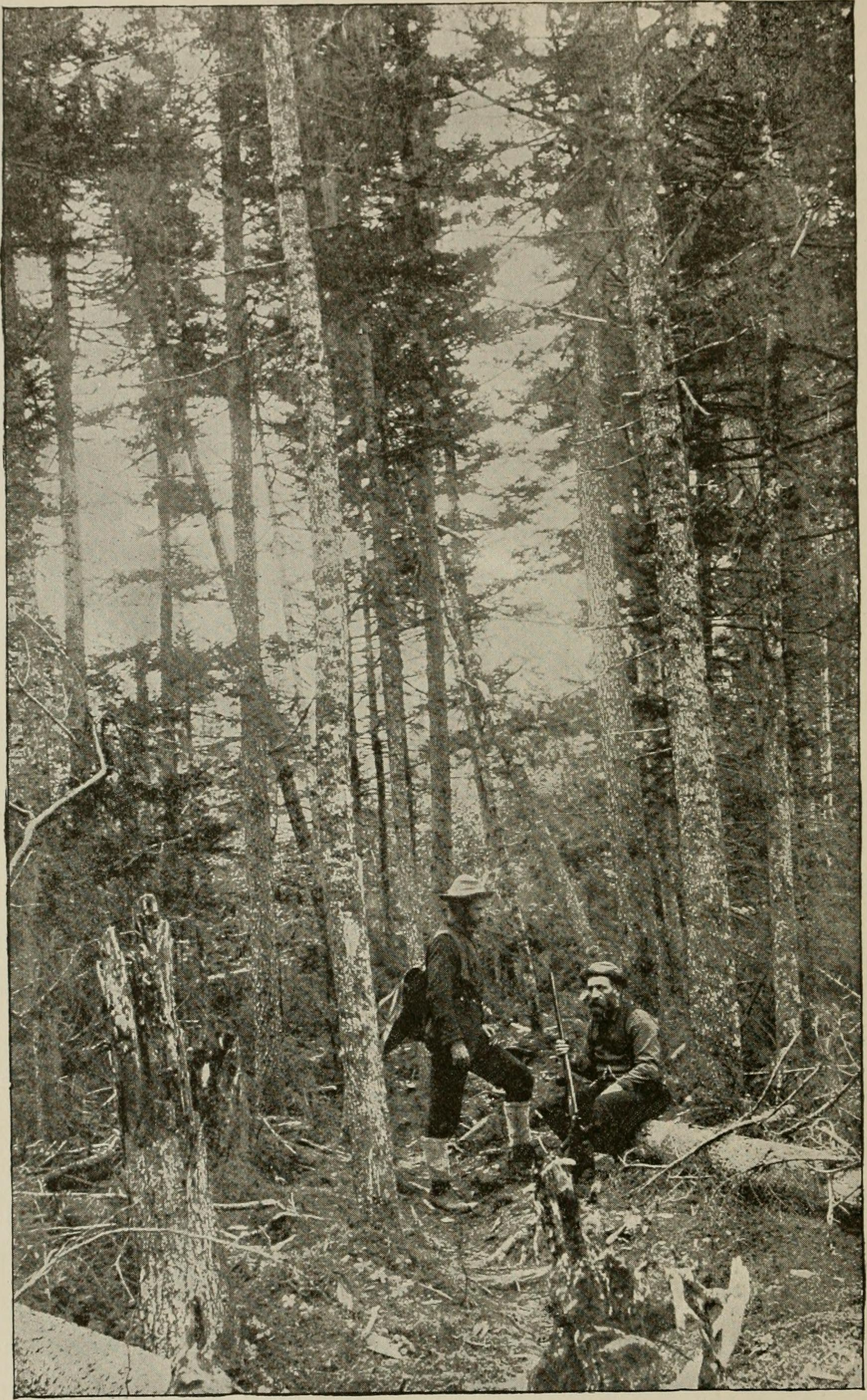
- Gilded age sportsmen carrying gear to Parmachenee Lake in the early days of the Parmachenee Club.

- Location within Maine Location within the United States
- Location: Oxford County, Maine
- Coordinates: 45°09′N 70°59′W
- Primary inflows: Magalloway River
- Primary outflows: Magalloway River
- Basin countries: United States
- Max. length: 2.9 mi (4.7 km)
- Surface area: 913 acres (369 ha)
- Max. depth: 93 feet (28 m)
- Water volume: 29,130 acre⋅ft (35,930,000 m^{3})
- Surface elevation: 1,629 ft (497 m)

Parmachenee Lake is on the Magalloway River near the Canadian border on the western edge of Maine. The lake was named after the daughter of Native American chief Metalluk, and is best known for the Gilded Age Parmachenee Club. The Magalloway River head-waters enter the north end of the lake in Parmachenee township, and the lake extends south into Lynchtown township where it overflows 2 miles (3.2 km) upstream of Aziscohos Reservoir.

== Angling ==
The lake is habitat for native brook trout and land-locked Atlantic salmon preying on rainbow smelt, minnows, and suckers. As trout and salmon disappeared from rivers in more heavily populated parts of the United States, a group of affluent New York lawyers pooled resources to preserve the Parmachenee Lake area for angling and sport hunting by their friends and families. Their Parmachenee Club protected the ecosystem from market hunters and commercial fishing until the Maine Department of Inland Fisheries and Wildlife implemented fisheries management on a statewide scale. Water quality remains good in the lake, and populations of native fish survive and reproduce without stocking.

== Parmachenee Club ==
The Parmachenee Club was formed in 1890 to lease 120,000 acres (49,000 ha) of commercial forest land extending south from the Canadian border where they built a camp in the meadows along the Magalloway River. Club members lodged at the camp while engaged in sport hunting and angling. The meadows and camp were seasonally flooded by a log driving dam built by Brown Mills Company and International Paper Company. Camp Caribou was originally a floating camp built by John Danforth who in 1870 relocated the camp to Treat's Island. In 1890 it was sold to the Parmachenee Club who expanded the facility with a farm house and farm on the east shore and a fish hatchery. Camp Caribou eventually consisted of a main lodge, maids' quarters, guides' quarters, a large woodshed and 13 individual family cabins. They also developed a hillside spring that was piped across the lake to the club. As angling opportunities declined on more accessible lakes before the advent of fishing licenses, fishing seasons, slot limits, and creel limits, the nearly aboriginal conditions of the private reserve of the Parmachenee Club became legendary among outdoor writers. Parmachenee Lake became a vacation retreat for the United States' industrial and political elite. One of the last visitors, before the club disbanded in the 1960s, was President Dwight D. Eisenhower in 1955 who slept in Cabin 5. The Brown Company eventually bought the property and used it as a corporate retreat. The island was then leased to a private individual and has been seasonally occupied since then.

== Parmachenee Belle ==
Fly fishing was the preferred angling method of the gilded age; and anglers often tied their own artificial flies. Rhode Island patent attorney and Parmachenee Club member Henry Parkhurst Wells invented an artificial fly he named the Parmachenee Belle in remembrance of fishing on Parmachenee Lake. The pattern has been widely copied and used across the United States.
