= List of public art in Hillsboro, Oregon =

List of public artworks in Hillsboro, Oregon, U.S.

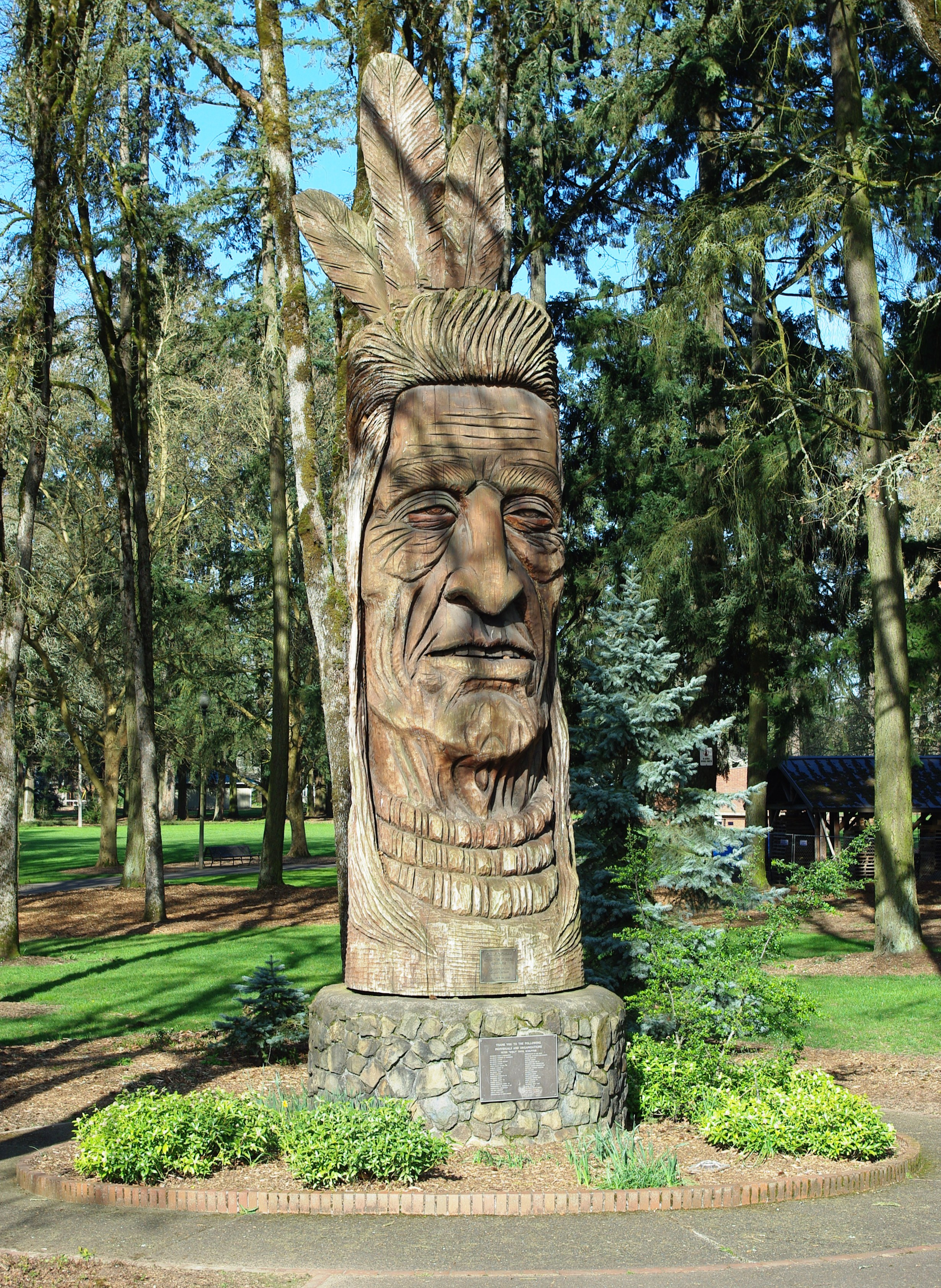
Chief Kno-Tah in 2010

Public artworks in Hillsboro, Oregon include:

- Barometer (2013)
- Bird Child Travels Through History (2014), Angelina Marino-Heidel
- Burger Family
- Champion Flock of Weed Eaters (2015)
- Chief Kno-Tah
- The Conflict (2017)
- Dancing Chairs (2009)
- Dynamic Orbits (2016), Adrian Litman
- Eastbound Train (2017)
- El Número Seis (2012)
- Fly with the Sun II (2014)
- Flight (2004)
- Get Down With da Dirt! (2014)
- The Grand Staircase (2005)
- Head Over Heels (2017)
- Hello Neighbor
- Jackson Bottom Mist (2011)
- Kids' Games (2004)
- Magnolia Park (2008)
- Main Street Bridge Lighting (2015)
- Mother Earth, Father Time (2004)
- Oasis Gargoyles (2016)
- On Main Street in Downtown Hillsboro (2017)
- Quintessential Eve (2012)
- Reflected Past (2015)
- Riverbed (2004)
- Rood Bridge Park with Mid Century Modern Style (2014)
- Rose Garden (2011)
- Seeds of Orenco (2016)
- Sequoia Collection
- Sequoia Frond (2004)
- Shute Park Library Pavers (2014)
- Shute Seeds (2016)
- Stewards' Gateway (2013)
- Symphony of Light (2013)
- Unrushed, at the Venetian (2015)
- Walking Warrior (2012)
- Wine with Friends (2012)
