= Barometer (sculpture) =

Sculpture in Hillsboro, Oregon, U.S.

- Sculpture in 2013
- Artist: Devin Laurence Field
- Year: 2013
- Type: Sculpture
- Medium: Stainless steel
- Dimensions: 4.6 m (15 ft)
- Location: Hillsboro, Oregon; 45.553547°N 122.907271°W

Barometer is a 2013 sculpture by Devin Laurence Field, to be installed at the newly constructed Hillsboro Ballpark in Oregon, United States. The stainless steel sculpture, commissioned by the City of Hillsboro, stands fifteen feet (4.6 meters) tall at the stadium's entry plaza. Installation of the work began on June 10, 2013.

== Description ==
Barometer, commissioned by the City of Hillsboro for the newly constructed Hillsboro Ballpark, was designed by Northwest sculpture Devin Laurence Field. Field's design was chosen from twenty qualified candidates by an artist, design team, the Hillsboro Arts & Culture Council, and the Parks and Recreation Department. The stainless steel sculpture stands fifteen feet (4.6 meters) tall at the stadium's entry plaza. According to Fields, "the piece takes the overall triangular form of the baseball diamond held aloft by columns and illuminated with color changing, sound activated LED lights. The laser-cut skin of the diamond form is adorned with intricate patterns of baseball bats and balls [and other sports equipment]. Around the sculpture are various 'instruments' people can play, a giant horn, a rattle roller, drum sets and chimes that together form a symphony of sounds. When no one is at the park there is no colored light, when there is noise it lights up — the louder the noise, the brighter the light. The art is a veritable Barometer of excitement for the ballpark."

== See also ==
- 2013 in art
- List of public art in Hillsboro, Oregon
- Weather Machine, a sculpture in Portland, Oregon that displays daily weather predictions
