= Théophile Panadis =

Abenaki-Canadian storyteller and artist (1889–1966)

- Born: February 28, 1889; Odanak, Quebec, Canada
- Died: October 30, 1966 (aged 77); Nicolet, Quebec, Canada
- Occupations: Storyteller and artist

Théophile Panadis (28 February 1889 – 30 October 1966) was an Abenaki Canadian storyteller and artist who is known for his defense of the Abenaki language, culture, tradition, and way of life. He was declared a Person of National Historic Significance by Parks Canada in 2011 and has a trilingual plaque dedicated to him located in Odanak, Quebec.

== Early life ==
Théophile Panadis was born on February 28, 1889, in the Abenaki village of Odanak, Quebec, as the sixth child of Nicolas Panadis and Monique Wawanolett. He grew up when traditional Abenaki culture, knowledge, and ways of life were still very much alive. From his father, uncle, and other men in the community Panadis learned to hunt and fish and live off the land for weeks and months at a time.

He would also sell furs he caught to the Hudson's Bay Company and other merchants in Montreal. Panadis and his family also made various traditional Abenaki crafts, such as baskets, moccasins, snowshoes, and canoes, to sell to tourists to make money. Panadis was taken out of school by his father at the age of fourteen to assist him with hunting.

== Work as "The Storyteller" ==
By the mid-20th century while the way of the Abenaki was under threat from the Canadian government's colonial practices and the growing forestry industry in Quebec Panadis committed himself to ensure the continuation of traditional skills and knowledge among the Abenaki people. Through this work, he became known as "8tlokad", or "The Storyteller". Panadis would tell stories of Abenaki history and culture, including the first time the Abenaki travelled to the Saint-François River. He also told stories about maewlinnoak, those with great spiritual power, and traditional creation tales.

He began working with multiple ethnologists, A. Irving Hallowell in the 1920s and Gordon M. Day in the 1950s and 1960s, being an invaluable source of information for recording the traditions, myths, cosmology, ceremonies, and material culture of the Abenaki. As an example, he shared knowledge of the boundaries of family hunting territories with Hallowell so they could create a map together.

Panadis was also trilingual, speaking English, French, and Abenaki, and worked to preserve the Abenaki language. He also acted as a guide for sport-hunting and sport-fishing, led a dance group, and worked as an artist. His art included paintings, engravings, sculptures, canoes, and calumets. He would create work for friends and tourists and have people watch him create to transmit and preserve the knowledge and crafts he used.

== Personal life and death ==
Panadis had a son, Adrien Paradis, with Emma Groslouis.

Panadis also struggled with alcoholism throughout his life.

In 1958 he was struck by a truck and developed bursitis in his shoulder, which hindered his ability to paddle and thus his ability to be a guide. He also had issues with cataracts.

On October 29, 1966, Panadis was struck by a drunk driver while walking home from the grocery store. He was transported to the hospital in Nicolet and died the following day.

== Legacy ==
Panadis is remembered as a "true legend" and a "living history book" and helped contribute to the strength and influence of Abenaki arts and identity.

In 2011 he was declared a Person of National Historic Significance by Parks Canada as part of a group of 13 new historical designations of people, sites, and events relating to Indigenous history in Canada. His plaque, which is presented in Abenaki, English, and French, was unveiled on August 22, 2021, in Odanak.

In 2022 Odanak singer-songwriter Mali Obomsawin sampled Panadis's voice in the track "Pedegwajois" from her debut album Sweet Tooth (2022). Panadis tells a story for the first two minutes of the song while Obomsawin accompanies with bass. Filmmaker Alanis Obomsawin also wrote a song dedicated to Panadis titled "Theo" and describes him as a major influence on her work.
