= Trail of the Whispering Giants =

Series of sculptures by Peter Wolf Toth

The Trail of the Whispering Giants is a collection of sculptures by American artist Peter Wolf Toth. The sculptures range in height from 20 to 40 feet (6.1 to 12.2 m), and are between 8 and 10 feet (2.4 and 3.0 m) in diameter. In 2009, there were 74 Whispering Giants, with at least one in each of the 50 U.S. states, as well as in Ontario and Manitoba, Canada, and one in Hungary. One in Oregon was removed in 2017 after irreparable windstorm damage, reducing the total to 73. In 1988, Toth completed his goal of placing at least one statue in each of the 50 states, by carving one in Hawaii, and in 2008, he created his first Whispering Giant in Europe, Stephen I of Hungary in Délegyháza, Hungary along the Danube River.

In 2009, eight more Whispering Giants were planned.

== The sculptures ==
The 74 Whispering Giants range from 15 to 40 feet (4.6 to 12.2 m) in height, and all resemble natives of the region in which they are located. Toth always donates the Whispering Giant he creates to the town he carved it in, and never charges a fee for his time. He does require that the raw materials (a large log between 8 and 10 feet (2.4 and 3.0 m) in diameter) be provided, as well as lodging and living expenses. The carvings have been appraised at a quarter of a million dollars each.

Toth uses a hammer and a chisel as the basic tools to create the Whispering Giants, but on occasion will use a mallet and an axe, or rarely power tools. Before starting work on a Whispering Giant, Toth confers with local Native American tribes and local lawmakers. The sculpture that is created is a composite of all the physical characteristics, especially facial features, of the local tribe or tribes, as well as their stories and histories. Toth dismisses the notion that the Whispering Giant sculptures are totem poles or represent Native American art, and has further stated that it would be inappropriate to carve totems because they were traditionally carved by Northwestern Indian tribes and had religious significance, where his carvings are intended as sculptures of Native American people.

"I don't know a thing about carving totem poles, never made one nor expect to. My monument depicts an Indian, not copies of Indian art."

— Peter Wolf Toth, 1974

Currently Peter Toth resides in Edgewater, Florida, where he has a small studio where he carves small wooden statues to raise money to create more Whispering Giants. He travels around America to repair Whispering Giants he carved in the past that have not been kept up, as well as to carve new ones. The latest Whispering Giant carved was in Vincennes, Indiana, in 2009 out of Black Oak, but there are still eight more statues planned to be built.

== The Trail ==
#	Date	Location	State/Province	Medium	Approx. Height	Picture/Name	Background	Status
1	1972, February	La Jolla	California	Rock beach cliff				Lost
2	1972, Summer	Akron	Ohio	Maple				
3	1973, January	DeLand	Florida	Oak	7 feet			Lost to rot
4	1973, February	Colquitt; U.S. Highway 27	Georgia	Red Cedar	18 feet			Replaced with number 70. Reason for replacement unknown.
5	1973, April	Dothan Houston-Love Memorial Library	Alabama	Oak	20 feet	Mus-Quoian		
6	1973, June	Sharon	Pennsylvania	Elm	20 feet	Seneca		
7	1973, August	Dunkirk Route 5, Lake Shore Drive West	New York	Elm	7.5 feet	Ong-Gwe-Ohn-Weh		Restored by the artist in 2014
8	1973, October	Wheeling	West Virginia	Elm	14 feet	Kanououara		Destroyed by Dutch elm disease
9	1973, December	Cleveland Museum Center at 5ive Points	Tennessee	Oak	10 feet	Cherokee Chieftain		
10	1974, January	Punta Gorda A. C. Freeman House, 311 West Retta Esplanade	Florida	Parota	15 feet	Calostimucu	The carving took three months to complete and originally resided in front of the Best Western hotel (previously the Holiday Inn) until Hurricane Charley in 2004 damaged the building. The only whispering giant to feature two faces, it features a Native American man and woman on either side of it, along with the dream of a dying bison upon its back next to an eagle with a broken wing emerging from atop the head, intended to symbolize the prejudice and injustice Native people have experienced.	Restored by Toth in summer 2005, it was rededicated on 20 January 2006 with a time capsule buried within its base.
11	1974, October	Vancouver	Washington	White Fir	25 feet			
12	1975, February	New Orleans	Louisiana	Oak				Restored 2010 and currently exhibited at the entry of Brechtel Park, 4401 Lennox Blvd, New Orleans, LA.
13	1975, April	Little Rock	Arkansas	Oak	20 feet			
14	1975, June	Fort Wayne	Indiana		25 feet		Destroyed by termites.	
15	1975, August	Lansing Potter Park Zoo	Michigan	Elm	29 feet 3 inches			Removed in 2012.
16	1975, October	Hopewell off IL-29 atop the hill going into Hopewell	Illinois	Oak	18 feet			
17	1975, December	Ocean Springs Davidson Park	Mississippi	Cypress	27 feet	Crooked Feather		Damaged by Hurricane Elena in 1985. Toth returned for repairs in 1987, before decay continued through the 1990s. Replica commissioned and completed by local sculptor Thomas King in 1999.
18	1976, March	Wilmington Greenfield Park	North Carolina	Oak	27 feet			In 1979, the statue was moved from Greenfield Park to a walking trail near the "Lion's Bridge". In 1986, it was moved again to Buckhead, NC. Replaced by Statue #71.
19	1976, May	Virginia Beach Mount Trashmore City Park	Virginia	Cypress	24 feet			
20	1976, July	Atlantic City	New Jersey	Tulip Poplar				Missing (status unknown).
21	1976, September	Ocean City South Second Street & Baltimore Avenue	Maryland	Oak	20 feet	Assateague		
22	1976, December	Bethany Beach	Delaware	poplar	27 feet	Chief Little Owl		Destroyed by high winds in 1992; remains located at Indian Museum in Millsboro. Replaced in early 1990s, and again in 2002 with Statue #69.
23	1977, February	Charleston	South Carolina Charles Towne Landing	Darlington Oak	24 feet	Landing Brave		Restored by Toth in 2005.
24	1977, May	St. Louis Forest Park	Missouri	Oak	19 feet			Struck by lightning, may no longer exist
25	1977, July	Two Harbors Information Center 8, Highway 61 East	Minnesota	Pine	30 feet			
26	1977, September	Hayward Carnegie Library	Wisconsin	Oak	34 feet	Tribute to the Ojibwe		
27	1977, November	Desert Hot Springs; Cabot's Pueblo Museum	California	Sequoia/Cedar		Waokiye		
28	1978, June	Iowa Falls	Iowa	Cottonwood				
29	1978, September	Troy Doniphan County Courthouse	Kansas	Burr Oak	27 feet	Tall Oak		Restored by Toth in 2010.
30	1979, May	Broken Bow Beavers Bend State Park Forest Heritage Center	Oklahoma	Cypress				
31	1979, August	Loveland 2033 Waterdale Drive, Rock Ridge Ranch	Colorado	Cottonwood	37 feet	Redman		Relocated to a private ranch on the northern side of US Route 34 (west of Loveland, CO) from its original location on the southern shore of Lake Loveland.
32	1979, October	Red Lodge Red Lodge Library	Montana	Ponderosa Pine	25 feet			
33		Winslow Winslow Visitor Center	Arizona	Ponderosa Pine	40 feet			
34	1980, May	Texarkana	Texas	Red Oak				Missing (status unknown).
35	1980, July	Lincoln Lincoln Indian Center	Nebraska	Cottonwood	25 feet			Fallen giant has succumbed to birds, bugs, and weather. It has been destroyed.
36	1980, September	Worland Washakie County Courthouse	Wyoming	Douglas fir	20 feet	Brave 36 of trail of whispering giants		
37	1980, November	Idaho Falls North Tourist Park, Lincoln Road and North Yellowstone Highway	Idaho	Douglas Fir	27 feet			
38	1981, June	Aberdeen Anderson Park	South Dakota	Cottonwood	25 feet			Moved indoors for repair; viewable by appointment.
39	1981, August	Mandan Stage Stop, 601 6th Avenue Southeast	North Dakota	Cottonwood	25 feet (original); approx. 20 feet (damaged)			Struck and damaged by a car in 2013; majority of headdress fell off in a storm in 2020.
40	1981, October	Valdez Prince William Sound College	Alaska	Sitka spruce	30 feet	Amid a grove of spruce trees at Prince William Sound College.		
41	1982, May	Osceola	Iowa	Cottonwood				Destroyed in 1993 by winds and flood; replacement created by Jesse Kuhs.
42	24 July 1982	Narragansett Sprague Memorial Park	Rhode Island	Douglas fir	20 feet	Enishkeetompauog Narragansett		
43	1982, October	Groton	Connecticut	Douglas fir				In storage.
44	1983, May	Ft. Lauderdale D.C. Alexander Park, State Road A1A	Florida	Cypress	30 feet	in D.C. Alexander Park	Originally constructed: Seminole Indian tribe trading post	
45	24 July 1983	Plymouth Tourist Information Center, Route 3, Exit 5	Massachusetts	Red Oak	30 feet	Enisketomp		
46	1983, October	Bar Harbor	Maine	Elm		Glooscap		Glooscap was relocated in May 2004 after a year restoration.
47	22 July 1984	Burlington Battery Park	Vermont	Red Oak	34 feet	Chief Grey Lock		The statue has undergone severe internal rot, but was LiDAR scanned on 23 August 2019 under guidance of a committee comprising the City of Burlington Department of Parks, Recreation and Waterfront; faculty members of the University of Vermont; a local non-profit "Branch Out Burlington"; and members of the Abenaki community.
48	1984, September	Laconia Opechee Park	New Hampshire	Red Oak	36 feet	Keewakwa Abenaki Keenahbeh		Lost to rot, but the sculpture was 3D scanned in hopes of creating a synthetic replica. After receiving city approval, the 3D replica was constructed and the replica was installed at the same location in October 2024.
49	1984, November	Springfield Forest Park	Massachusetts		15 feet	Omiskanoagwiah		
50	1985, May	Paducah Bob Noble Park	Kentucky	Red Oak	35 feet	Wacinton		The sculpture was restored during the summer of 2016.
51	1985, August	Akron Fairlawn Elementary School	Ohio	Red Oak	30 feet	Rotaynah		The sculpture was removed in Fall 2018 due to its deteriorating condition and safety concerns, The face of the sculpture (roughly 14 ft high) was saved, is in storage, and is looking for an indoor home to preserve it for future viewing. If you have an idea contact the Akron Public Schools.
52	23 November 1985	Murray City Park	Utah	Cottonwood		Chief Wasatch		
53	1986	Reno Idlewild Park	Nevada		17 feet	Wa-Pai-Shone		
54	1986	Las Cruces Southeast of Hwy 70	New Mexico	Pine	20 feet	Dineh		
55	29 November 1986	Johnson City Metro-Kiwanis Park	Tennessee	Chestnut Oak	25 feet	Chief Junaluska		The sculpture is in the process of being restored during October 2018.
56	1987, September 25	Hillsboro Shute Park	Oregon	Douglas Fir	25 feet	Chief Kno-Tah		Removed June 2017, after a windstorm caused damage that was deemed irreparable
57	1987	Astoria Youngs Bay Bridge	Oregon	Cedar	18 feet	Ikala Nawan		
58	1988, May	Hale'iwa 59-254 Kamehameha Highway, between Sunset Beach and Sunset Beach Elementary School	Hawaii	Douglas Fir or redwood	25 feet	Maui Pohaku Loa		Statue is no longer displayed. It is now horizontal on private property
59	1988, October	Wakefield Dock on Sunday Lake	Michigan		20 feet	Nee-Gaw-Nee-Gaw-Bow		
60	1988	Calvin Canadian Ecology Centre	Ontario, Canada		16 feet	Nibising		Originally displayed at the welcome Center in North Bay, Ontario. Can now be found resting horizontally in Calvin, Ontario.
61	1989, May	Ottawa off Hitt Street in Allen Park along the southern bank of the Illinois River	Illinois		13 feet	Ho-Ma-Sjah-Nah-Zhee-Ga		
62	1989	Utica Starved Rock State Park	Illinois	Oak	20 feet	Chief Walks with the Wind		
63	1989, September	Cherokee Museum of the Cherokee Indian	North Carolina	Sequoia	22 feet	Sequoyah		
64	1989	Concord "Buffalo Ranch" (defunct)	North Carolina		20 feet			Severely damaged
65	1989, October	Williamsport Brandon Park	Pennsylvania		20 feet	Woapalanne		Restored in 2019 and displayed at bus terminal at William St. and W. Willow St.
66		Hollywood Seminole Reservation	Florida					May have been moved to Fort Lauderdale, Florida.
67	1992	Winnipeg Beach In the Town Square	Manitoba, Canada	Cedar	30 feet	Anishinaabe		
68	1999	Iowa Falls Foster Blvd., adjacent to the Veterans Memorial overlooking the Iowa River	Iowa		30 feet			New statue replacing Statue #28
69	2002	Bethany Beach Front of Town Hall on Garfield Parkway	Delaware		25 feet	Chief Little Owl		In 1992, termites and high winds destroyed Statue #22. A replacement statue was carved out of white oak by Dennis D. Beach and lasted until 2000. Statue #69 carved by Peter Wolf Toth in 2002 replaces Statue #22
70	2002	Colquitt Chamber of Commerce building on Highway 27	Georgia		18 feet			New statue replaces Statue #4
71	2005	Buckhead Waccamaw Siouan Indians Reservation	North Carolina		16 feet			New statue replaces Statue #18 that was moved to this location from Wilmington, NC
72	2005	Whiteville North Carolina Museum of Forestry	North Carolina		16 feet			
73	2008	Délegyháza, Hungary				Stephen I of Hungary		
74	2009	Vincennes First and Hart streets	Indiana	Black Oak		Tecumseh		

== Criticism ==
While Toth intends for his sculptures to be a tribute to Native Americans that honors the injustices Native Americans have experienced, some critics view the statues as inauthentic and being based on caricatures and stereotypes of Native Americans. The statues are seen by some critics as anachronistic or racist. The columnist Maurice Switzer has condemned the statues as "ridiculous, offensive" and "lame-brained".
