= Androscoggin people =

Indigenous people of the Northeastern Woodlands

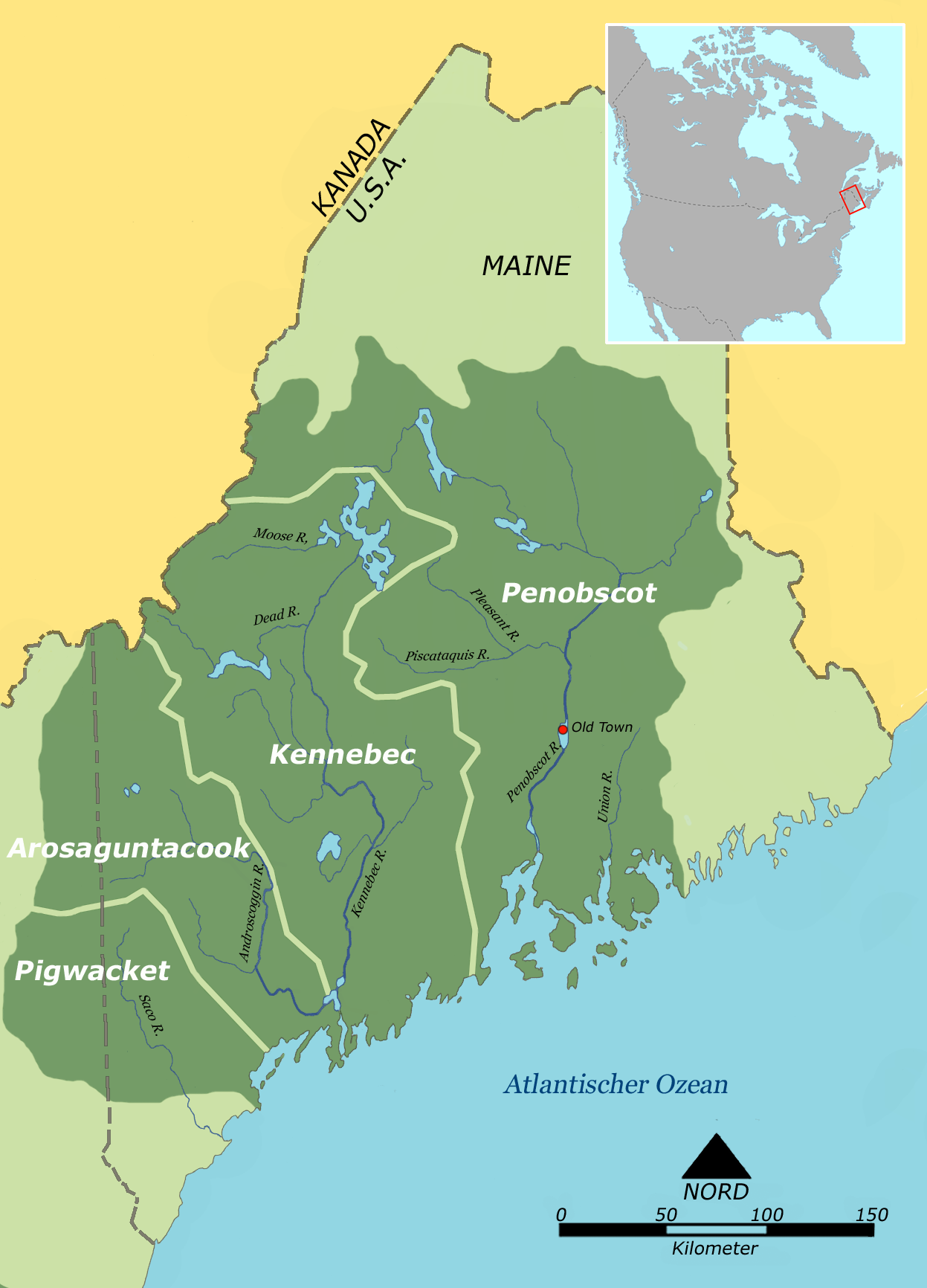
- Ammoscongan/Androscoggin territory, ca. early 17th century

Total population
- merged into St. Francis Abenaki

Regions with significant populations
- Quebec, formerly Maine and New Hampshire

Languages
- English, French, Abenaki language

Related ethnic groups
- other Abenaki people, notably the Pequawket

The Androscoggin were an Abenaki people and an Indigenous people of the Northeastern Woodlands. They historically lived along the Androscoggin River in what are now the U.S. states of Maine and New Hampshire. By the 18th century, they were absorbed by neighboring tribes and migrated north to Canada.

== Name ==
The Androscoggins' name was written at least 20 different ways, The name Arosaguntacook, often claimed to be the original name for the Androscoggin, is actually the Native village at Saint-Francis, across the St. Lawrence River from Odanak in Quebec.

The name of the Androscoggin is derived from an anglicization of the Abenaki-language term Ammoscongon, which was the name given for the portion of the Androscoggin River from Lewiston Falls northward, as stated by Pere Pole in 1793.

== Distribution ==
The Ammoscongon once lived in the Androscoggin River watershed, located in present-day southern Maine and northern New Hampshire. Their main village was located in the vicinity of present-day Lewiston, Maine. Together with the Pequawket (Pigwacket) near Fryeburg, Maine they formed the southernmost of the Eastern Abenaki tribes and were therefore one of the first in contact with the English colonists of New England.

== History ==
=== 17th century ===
In 1675, the Androscoggin took part in King Philip's War. The renowned hunter, trapper, fisherman and guide, Metallak (1727–1847), was a member of the Androscoggin tribe.

=== 18th century ===
In 1725, the Androscoggin joined the Pequawket and migrated to the Connecticut River in New Hampshire. Historian David L. Ghere wrote that several Androscoggin families returned in Maine after the 1727 Drummer's War and that they were written about in Maine through the 1730s.

They later migrated north to Canada, where they settled in Saint-François-du-Lac, Quebec, present day Abenaki First Nations of Odanak.

== Maps ==
Maps showing the approximate locations of areas occupied by members of the Wabanaki Confederacy (from north to south):

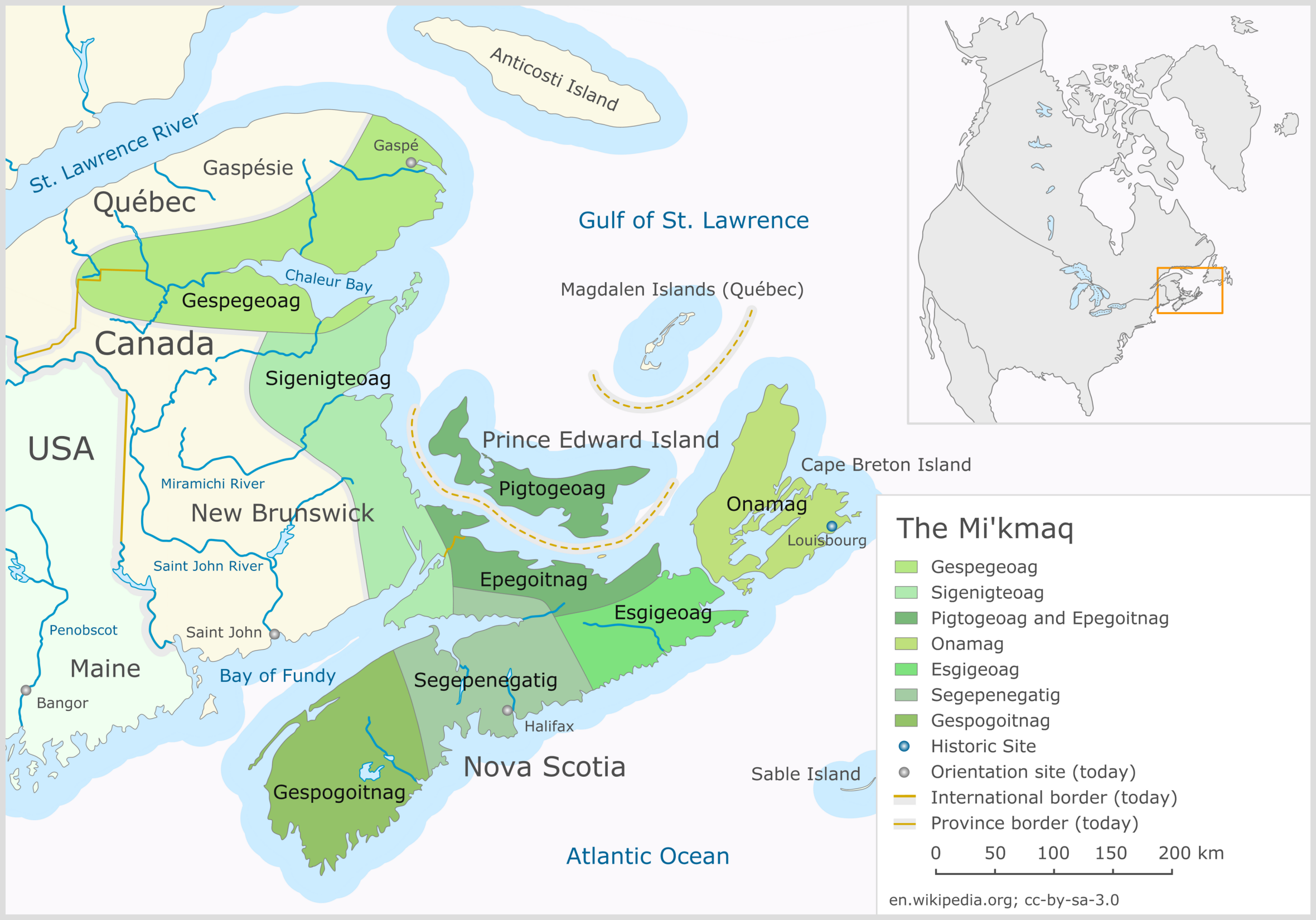
Mi'kmaq

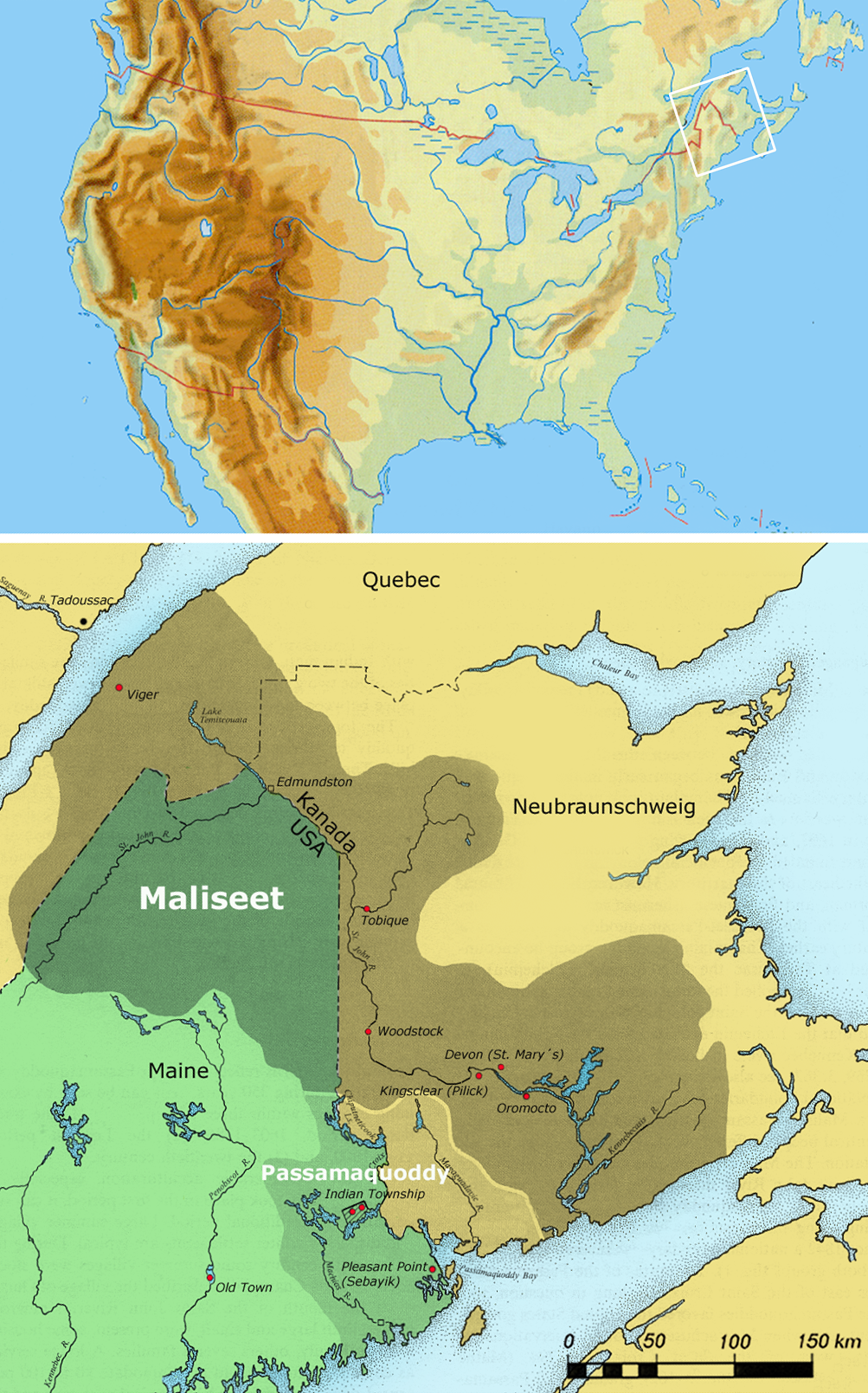
Maliseet, Passamaquoddy

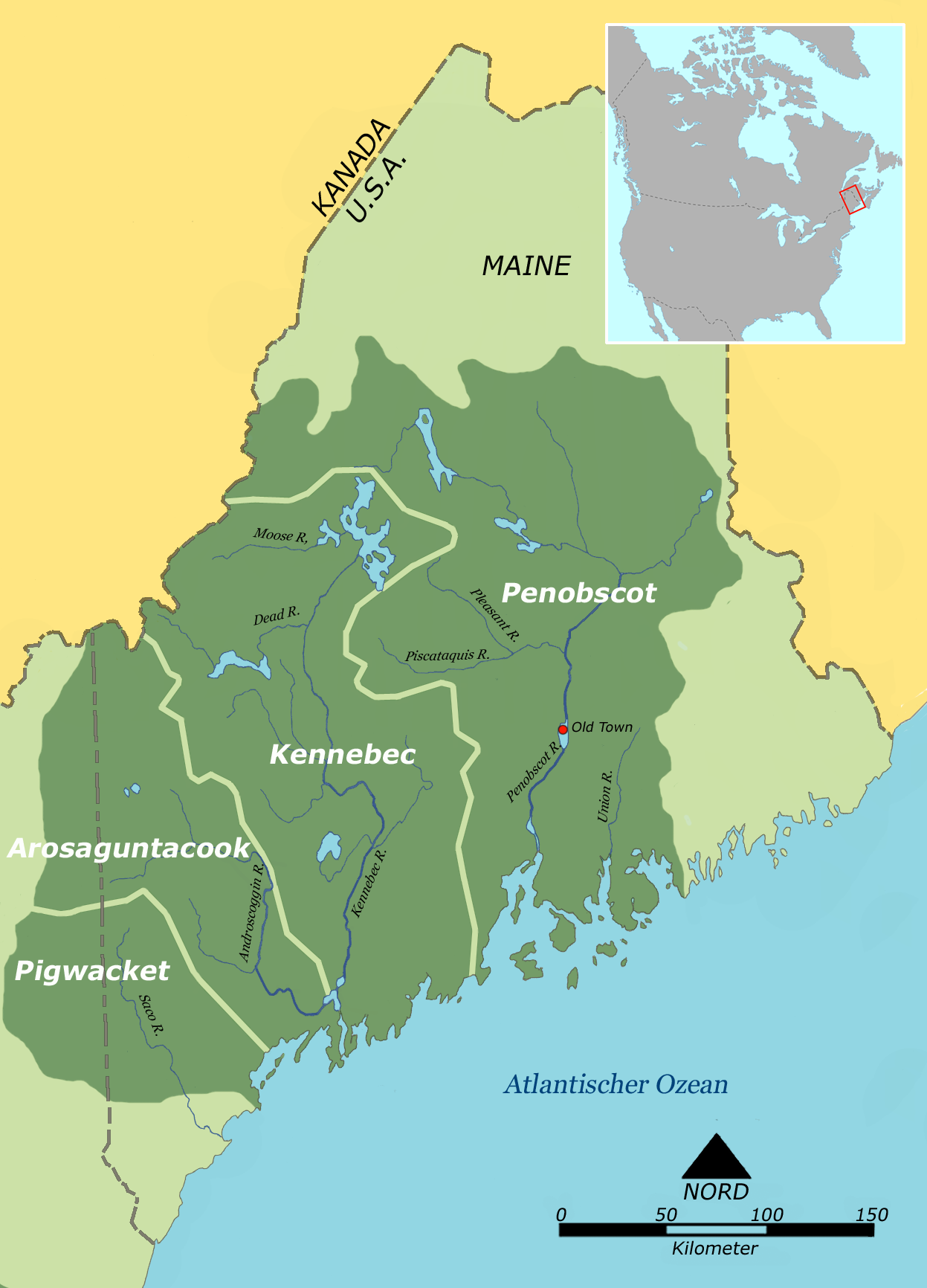
Eastern Abenaki (Penobscot, Kennebec, Pigwacket/Pequawket)

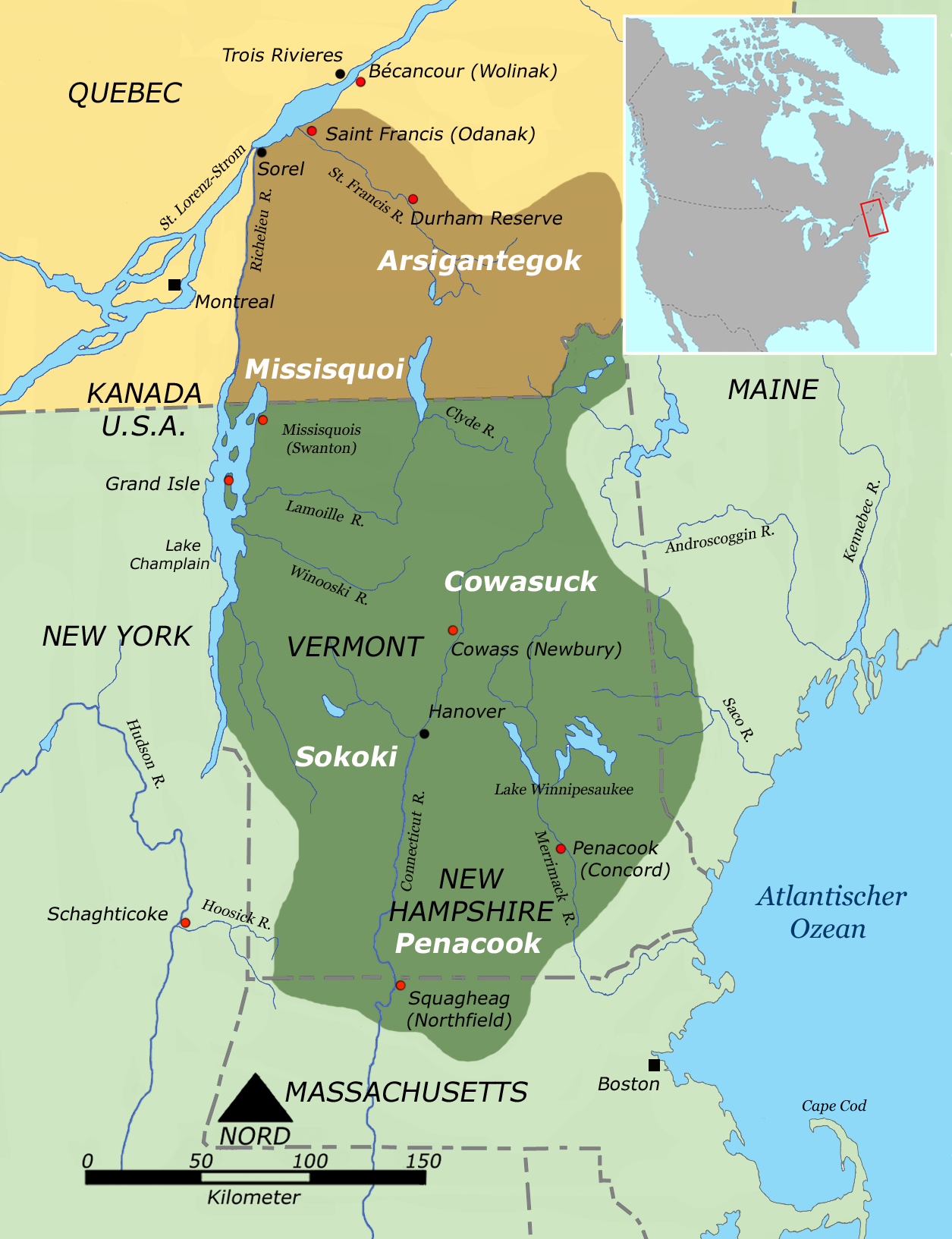
Western Abenaki (Arsigantegok, Missisquoi, Cowasuck, Sokoki, Pennacook

== See also ==
- List of Native American peoples in the United States
- Androscoggin County, Maine
