= Smallpox in society and culture =

Smallpox was a dangerous virus disease that caused deaths around the world. It may have been used as a form of biological warfare. It affected many famous historical figures from Ramses V to George Washington. Smallpox gods and goddesses have been worshipped in regions including China and India in the hope of warding off or curing the disease.

== Biological warfare ==
In 1763, Pontiac's War broke out as a Native American confederacy led by Pontiac attempted to counter British control over the Great Lakes region. A group of Native American warriors laid siege to British-held Fort Pitt on June 22. In response, Henry Bouquet, the commander of the fort, ordered his subordinate Simeon Ecuyer to give smallpox-infested blankets from the infirmary to a Delaware delegation outside the fort. Bouquet had discussed this with his superior, Sir Jeffrey Amherst, who wrote to Bouquet stating: "Could it not be contrived to send the small pox among the disaffected tribes of Indians? We must on this occasion use every stratagem in our power to reduce them." Bouquet agreed with the proposal, writing back that "I will try to inocculate [sic] the Indians by means of Blankets that may fall in their hands". On 24 June 1763, William Trent, a local trader and commander of the Fort Pitt militia, wrote, "Out of our regard for them, we gave them two Blankets and an Handkerchief out of the Small Pox Hospital. I hope it will have the desired effect." The effectiveness of this effort to broadcast the disease is unknown. There are also accounts that smallpox was used as a weapon during the American Revolutionary War (1775–1783).

According to a theory put forward in Journal of Australian Studies (JAS) by independent researcher Christopher Warren, Royal Marines used smallpox in 1789 against indigenous tribes in New South Wales. This theory was also considered earlier in Bulletin of the History of Medicine and by David Day. However it is disputed by some medical academics, including Professor Jack Carmody, who in 2010 claimed that the rapid spread of the outbreak in question was more likely indicative of chickenpox – a more infectious disease which, at the time, was often confused, even by surgeons, with smallpox, and may have been comparably deadly to Aboriginals and other peoples without natural immunity to it. Carmody noted that in the 8-month voyage of the First Fleet and the following 14 months there were no reports of smallpox amongst the colonists and that, since smallpox has an incubation period of 10–12 days, it is unlikely it was present in the First Fleet; however, Warren argued in the JAS article that the likely source was bottles of variola virus possessed by First Fleet surgeons. Ian and Jennifer Glynn, in The life and death of smallpox, confirm that bottles of "variolous matter" were carried to Australia for use as a vaccine, but think it unlikely the virus could have survived till 1789. In 2007, Christopher Warren offered evidence that the British smallpox may have been still viable. However, the only non-Aboriginal reported to have died in this outbreak was a seaman called Joseph Jeffries, who was recorded as being of "American Indian" origin.

W. S. Carus, an expert in biological weapons, has written that there is circumstantial evidence that smallpox was deliberately introduced to the Aboriginal population. However Carmody and the Australian National University's Boyd Hunter continue to support the chickenpox hypothesis. In a 2013 lecture at the Australian National University, Carmody pointed out that chickenpox, unlike smallpox, was known to be present in the Sydney Cove colony. He also suggested that all c. 18th century (and earlier) identifications of smallpox outbreaks were dubious because: "surgeons ... would have been unaware of the distinction between smallpox and chickenpox – the latter having traditionally been considered a milder form of smallpox."

During World War II, scientists from the United Kingdom, United States, and Japan (Unit 731 of the Imperial Japanese Army) were involved in research into producing a biological weapon from smallpox. Plans of large scale production were never carried through as they considered that the weapon would not be very effective due to the wide-scale availability of a vaccine.

In 1947, the Soviet Union established a smallpox weapons factory in the Scientific Research Institute of Medicine of the Ministry of Defense in Sergiyev Posad in Zagorsk, 75 km to the northeast of Moscow. An outbreak of weaponized smallpox occurred during testing at a facility on an island in the Aral Sea in 1971. General Prof. Peter Burgasov, former Chief Sanitary Physician of the Soviet Army and a senior researcher within the Soviet program of biological weapons, described the incident:

On Vozrozhdeniya Island in the Aral Sea, the strongest recipes of smallpox were tested. Suddenly I was informed that there were mysterious cases of mortalities in Aralsk. A research ship of the Aral fleet came to within 15 km of the island (it was forbidden to come any closer than 40 km). The lab technician of this ship took samples of plankton twice a day from the top deck. The smallpox formulation – 400 gr. of which was exploded on the island – "got her" and she became infected. After returning home to Aralsk, she infected several people including children. All of them died. I suspected the reason for this and called the Chief of General Staff of the Ministry of Defense and requested to forbid the stop of the Alma-Ata–Moscow train in Aralsk. As a result, the epidemic around the country was prevented. I called Andropov, who at that time was Chief of KGB, and informed him of the exclusive recipe of smallpox obtained on Vozrazhdenie Island.

Others contend that the first patient may have contracted the disease while visiting Uyaly or Komsomolsk-on-Ustyurt, two cities where the boat docked.

Responding to international pressures, in 1991 the Soviet government allowed a joint U.S.–British inspection team to tour four of its main weapons facilities at Biopreparat. The inspectors were met with evasion and denials from the Soviet scientists and were eventually ordered out of the facility. In 1992, Soviet defector Ken Alibek alleged that the Soviets had produced a stockpile of weaponized smallpox.

In 1997, the Russian government announced that all of its remaining smallpox samples would be moved to the Vector Institute in Koltsovo. With the breakup of the Soviet Union and unemployment of many of the weapons program's scientists, U.S. government officials have expressed concern that smallpox and the expertise to weaponize it may have become available to other governments or terrorist groups who might wish to use virus as means of biological warfare. Specific allegations made against Iraq in this respect proved to be false.

== Notable cases ==
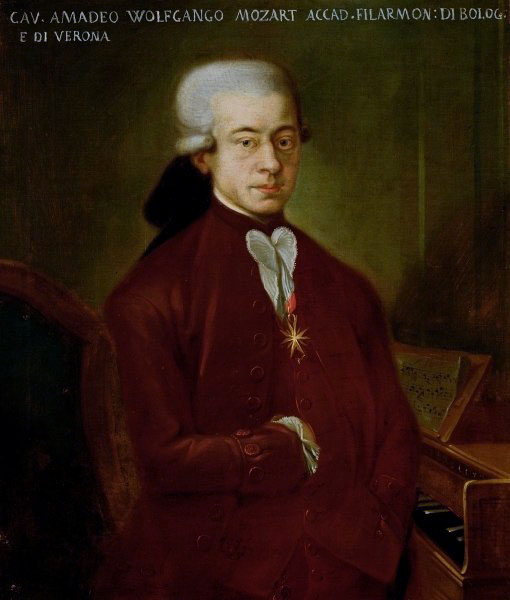
In 1767, the 11-year-old composer Wolfgang Amadeus Mozart survived a smallpox outbreak.

Famous historical figures who contracted smallpox include Ramses V. In Europe, deaths from smallpox often changed dynastic succession. Louis XV of France succeeded his great-grandfather Louis XIV through a series of deaths of smallpox or measles among those higher in the succession line. He himself died of the disease in 1774. Peter II of Russia died of the disease at 14 years of age. Peter III of Russia caught the virus and was left scarred and disfigured. His wife, Catherine the Great, was spared but fear of the virus led her to have herself inoculated by a British doctor, Thomas Dimsdale.

U.S. presidents George Washington, Andrew Jackson, and Abraham Lincoln all contracted and recovered from the disease. Washington became infected with smallpox on a visit to Barbados in 1751. Jackson developed the illness after being taken prisoner by the British during the American Revolution. Lincoln contracted the disease during his presidency, and was quarantined shortly after giving the Gettysburg address in 1863. The famous theologian Jonathan Edwards died of smallpox in 1758 following an inoculation.

Soviet leader Joseph Stalin fell ill with smallpox at the age of seven. His face was badly scarred by the disease. He later had photographs retouched to make his pockmarks less apparent. Hungarian poet Ferenc Kölcsey, who wrote the Hungarian national anthem, lost his right eye to smallpox.

== Tradition and religion ==
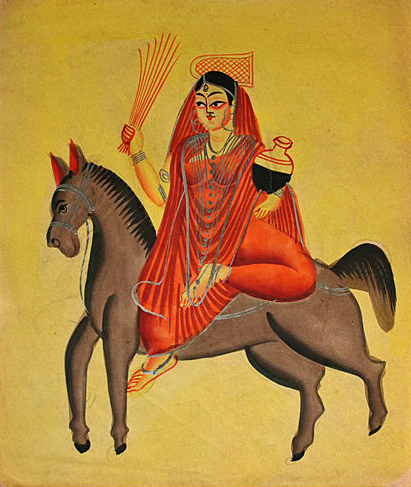
The Hindu goddess Shitala was worshipped to prevent or cure smallpox.

In the face of the devastation of smallpox, various smallpox gods and goddesses have been worshipped throughout parts of the Old World, for example in China and India. In China, the smallpox goddess was referred to as T'ou-Shen Niang-Niang (Chinese: 痘疹娘娘). Chinese believers actively worked to appease the goddess and pray for her mercy, by such measures as referring to smallpox pustules as "beautiful flowers" as a euphemism intended to avert offending the goddess, for example (the Chinese word for smallpox is 天花, literally "heaven flower"). In a related New Year's Eve custom it was prescribed that the children of the house wear ugly masks while sleeping, so as to conceal any beauty and thereby avoid attracting the goddess, who would be passing through sometime that night. If a case of smallpox did occur, shrines would be set up in the homes of the victims, to be worshipped and offered to as the disease ran its course. If the victim recovered, the shrines were removed and carried away in a special paper chair or boat for burning. If the patient did not recover, the shrine was destroyed and cursed, to expel the goddess from the house.

In the Yoruba language smallpox is known as ṣọpọná, but it was also written as shakpanna, shopona, ṣhapana, and ṣọpọnọ. The word is a combination of 3 words, the verb ṣán, meaning to cover or plaster (referring to the pustules characteristic of smallpox), kpa or pa, meaning to kill, and enia, meaning human. Roughly translated, it means One who kills a person by covering them with pustules. Among the Yorùbá people of West Africa, and also in Dahomean religion, Trinidad, and in Brazil, The deity Sopona, also known as Obaluaye, is the deity of smallpox and other deadly diseases (like leprosy, HIV/AIDS, and fevers). One of the most feared deities of the orisha pantheon, smallpox was seen as a form of punishment from Shopona. Worship of Shopona was highly controlled by his priests, and it was believed that priests could also spread smallpox when angered. However, Shopona was also seen as a healer who could cure the diseases he inflicted, and he was often called upon by his victims to heal them. The British government banned the worship of the god because it was believed his priests were purposely spreading smallpox to their opponents.

India's first records of smallpox can be found in a medical book that dates back to before 400 CE. This book describes a disease that sounds exceptionally like smallpox. India, like China and the Yorùbá, created a goddess in response to its exposure to smallpox. The Hindu goddess Shitala was both worshipped and feared during her reign. It was believed that this goddess was both evil and kind and had the ability to inflict victims when angered, as well as calm the fevers of the already affected. Portraits of the goddess show her holding a broom in her right hand to continue to move the disease and a pot of cool water in the other hand in an attempt to soothe patients. Shrines were created where many Indian natives, both healthy and not, went to worship and attempt to protect themselves from this disease. Some Indian women, in an attempt to ward off Shitala, placed plates of cooling foods and pots of water on the roofs of their homes.

In cultures that did not recognise a smallpox deity, there was often nonetheless a belief in smallpox demons, who were accordingly blamed for the disease. Such beliefs were prominent in Japan, Europe, Africa, and other parts of the world. Nearly all cultures who believed in the demon also believed that it was afraid of the colour red. This led to the introduction of the 'red treatment', where patients and their rooms would be decorated in red. The practice spread to Europe in the 12th century, performed by Charles V of France and Elizabeth I of England, among others. Afforded scientific credibility through the studies by Niels Ryberg Finsen showing that red light reduced scarring, this belief persisted until the 1930s.
