= Christine Sioui-Wawanoloath =

Canadian First Nations writer and artist (born 1952)

Christine Sioui Wawanoloath
- Born: 1952 (age 73–74)
- Education: Collège Manitou
- Occupations: Writer, playwright, sculptor, artist, poet
- Children: Alexis Wawanoloath
- Relatives: Monique Sioui
- Website: iosazaso.wixsite.com/sioui-wawanoloath

Christine Sioui-Wawanoloath (born 1952) is a First Nations writer and artist living in Quebec, Canada.

Her son Alexis served in the Quebec national assembly. Her sister Monique was a Native rights activist.

== Early life and education ==
The daughter of Augustin Sioui, Wendat (Huron), and Esther Wawanolett, Abenaki, she was born in Wendake. The name Sioui represents the meaning "He or she who carries the light", while Wawanoloath translates to which means "fools the enemy."

After the death of her father while she was still an infant, the remainder of the family moved to Odanak. She studied photography, art and history in Montreal and at Collège Manitou.

== Career ==
She worked as darkroom technician, photographer, graphic artist and journalist for First Nations publications in Ottawa, Frobisher Bay and Val-d'Or. In 1985, she became program director for the Centre d'amitié autochtone in Val-d'Or. From 1992 to 2002, she was director of the non-violence program for Femmes autochtones du Québec. She then became a communications specialist for Terres en vues/Land InSights. Sioui-Wawanoloath is a painter, illustrator and the author of three plays, two of which have already been staged: Femme et esprit and Femme, homme et esprits. She also creates sculptures and writes poetry and stories.

Sioui-Wawanoloath provided the text for Le clan des oiseaux, a show for the 400th anniversary of Quebec City which featured music performed by the Orchestre Symphonique de Québec and L'Arsenal à musique.

== Selected works ==
- La légende des oiseaux qui ne savaient plus voler (1995)
- Toloti (2003)
- Natanis (2005)
