= Monique Sioui =

Indigenous rights activist (1950-1997)

- Born: April 7, 1951
- Died: October 18, 1997 (aged 46)
- Occupation: Activist
- Organization: Quebec Native Women
- Spouse: Richard Kistabish
- Relatives: Christine Sioui-Wawanoloath (sister)

Monique Sioui (1950 – 1997) was an activist for the rights of Indigenous women and children. She was the sister of writer and artist Christine Sioui-Wawanoloath.

Sioui was the daughter of Augustin Sioui, Huron-Wendat, and Esther Wawanolett, Abenaki. She was a founding member of Quebec Native Women, serving as president in 1976. She dealt with issues such as discrimination against Indigenous women under the Indian Act and adoption of Indigenous children by non-Indigenous foster parents. In 1980, she went to the Netherlands to attend the Russell Tribunal where she identified discriminatory aspects of the Indian Act. She went on to work against domestic violence and spousal abuse in the Abitibi-Témiscamingue region. In 1998, she was awarded the Prix Droits et Libertés posthumously by the Quebec Commission des droits de la personne et des droits de la jeunesse.

Sioui was married to Richard Kistabish.
