= USS President (1812) =

Sloop-of-war of the United States Navy

History

United States
- Name: President
- Acquired: 1812
- Fate: Captured 1814

General characteristics
- Type: 12-Gun sloop
- Armament: 6 × 18-pounder columbiad guns and 4 × 12-pounder long guns

USS President was a 12-gun sloop and the second United States Navy ship to carry the name. Her dimensions and builder are unknown, but she was originally purchased by the War Department on Lake Champlain and turned over to the Navy late in 1812. President, together with other suitable craft that had been purchased and built, temporarily gave Americans dominance on Lake Champlain. She served simultaneously but separate from President during the War of 1812. President was captured by the Royal Navy in 1814 and taken into service as HMS Icicle.

In 1813 the ship flew 2 unique large flags. They both bore a white field with black text. One contained the words "no impressment," and the other "This is the haughty President, how do you like her?"
