= Odanak =

- Indian reserve
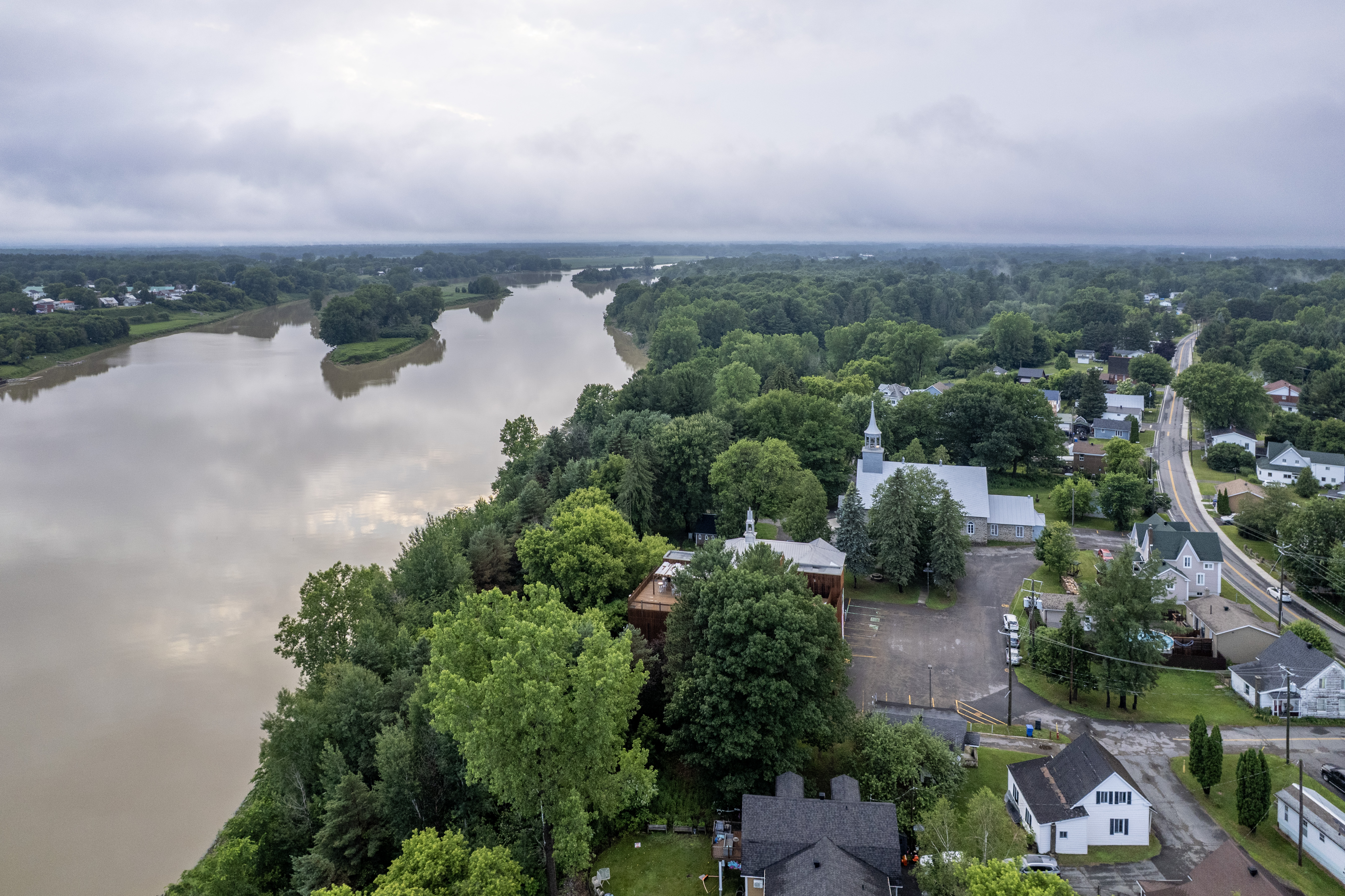
- Aerial view of Odanak

- Flag

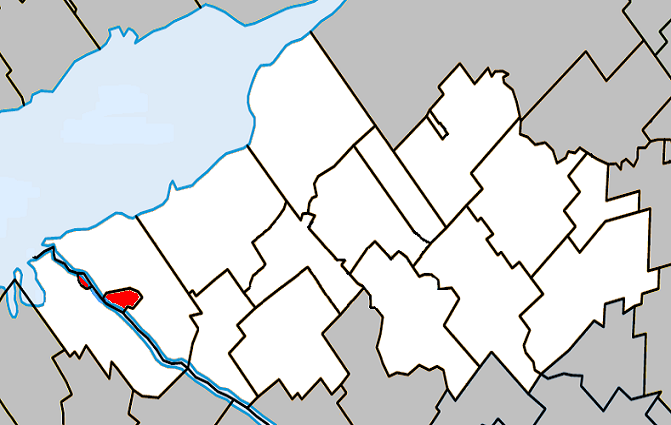
- Location within Nicolet-Yamaska RCM

- Location in southern Quebec Odanak (Quebec)
- Coordinates: 46°04′N 72°50′W
- Country: Canada
- Province: Quebec
- Region: Centre-du-Québec
- RCM: None
- Constituted: unspecified

Government
  - Type: Band council
  - Chief: Richard O'Bomsawin
  - Federal riding: Bécancour—Nicolet—Saurel—Alnôbak
  - Prov. riding: Nicolet-Bécancour

Area
  - Total: 5.70 km^{2} (2.20 sq mi)
  - Land: 5.61 km^{2} (2.17 sq mi)

Population (2021)
  - Total: 481
  - Density: 85.8/km^{2} (222/sq mi)
  - Dwellings: 243
- Time zone: UTC−5 (EST)
  - Summer (DST): UTC−4 (EDT)
- Area code: 450
- Access Routes: R-132; R-226

Odanak is an Abenaki First Nations reserve in the Central Quebec region, Quebec, Canada. The mostly First Nations population as of the 2021 Canadian census was 481. The territory is located near the mouth of the Saint-François River at its confluence with the St. Lawrence River. It is partly within the limits of Pierreville and across the river from Saint-François-du-Lac. Odanak is an Abenaki word meaning "in the village".

== History ==
Beginning about 1000 CE, Iroquoian-speaking people settled along the St. Lawrence River, where they practiced agriculture along with hunting and fishing. Archeological surveys have revealed that by 1300, they built fortified villages similar to those seen and described by French explorer Jacques Cartier in the mid-16th century, when he visited Hochelaga and Stadacona.

By end of the 16th century, these early villages and people were gone. Since the 1950s, historians and anthropologists have used archeological and linguistic evidence to develop a consensus that the people formed a distinct ethnic group, whom they have called St. Lawrence Iroquoians. They spoke Laurentian and were separate from the powerful Iroquois Confederacy of nations that developed in present-day New York and Pennsylvania along the southern edges of the Great Lakes.

Their disappearance by 1600 is believed to be due to attacks and decimation from the Mohawk people of the Iroquois Confederacy; they stood to gain the most by getting control of the hunting grounds along the St. Lawrence River and dominating the fur trade route on the river above Tadoussac, which was under Montagnais control. By the time of Samuel de Champlain's arrival, the St. Lawrence River Valley was essentially uninhabited; the Mohawk reserved it for use as hunting grounds and as a path for war parties.

=== 17th century ===
As French missionaries worked in present-day Quebec and central-western New York with Native peoples in the late 17th and early 18th centuries, they established mission villages for converted Indigenous people near the colonial towns of Quebec City and Montreal. The Abenaki who converted to Catholicism were allied with the French. Evidence supports the tradition that St. Francis was first occupied by the Sokoki (Ozogwakiakas in Abenaki) as early as 1660, with as many as 20 families; the earliest Sokoki baptism recorded in the area was nearby in Trois-Rivières in 1658. The Sokoki were a band or tribe within the larger Abenaki group.

The Androscoggin people, also known as Arosaguntacook, were another band of Abenaki who formerly lived in central Maine. They were driven out of the area by Europeans in 1690 sometime after King Philip's War (1675–1676).

=== 18th century ===
A new settlement at Odanak was established in 1700. While traveling along the banks of the St. François River the Jesuit Priest Jacques Bigot made the decision to relocate the Jesuit mission "La Mission de Saint François de Sale" that was established in 1684 at the mouth of the Chaudière River to the banks of the St. François River following years of successive crop failure due to agricultural overexploitation. The new mission was to be established in close proximity to a small village of both Abenaki and Sokokis that Bigot had previously observed during his travels throughout the region in the winter of 1684–1685. At the request of the Governor General of New France Louis-Hector de Callière and the Intendant Jean Bochart de Champigny, Marguerite Hertel the widow of Jean Crevier de Saint-François and her son Joseph Crevier granted one "demi lieu" of land from their seigneury to the Abenakis which was accepted on behalf of Bigot on which the new mission was to be constructed.

In 1704, the King Louis XIV of France ordered the King's Engineer, Levasseur De Néré to draw up a plan in order fortify the Jesuit mission during the War of the Spanish Succession to provide protection for the families of the Abenaki and Sokoki warriors who had sided with the French against the English and the Iroquois during the war and in prior conflicts. Governor Callière subsequently ordered the construction of defensive features such as redoubts and a 4.7 m high palisade that was to be reinforced with stone bastions. During this war, Abenaki warriors were involved in numerous raids and conflicts such as the infamous Deerfield Raid of 29 February 1704 in which 112 English captives were taken.

In 1706, the village was moved from its original location on the north-eastern bank of the St. François River downstream, near the current location of Pierreville in order to accommodate a growing population. In the summer of 1711, Odanak was temporarily abandoned due to the threats posed by Admiral Hovenden Walker's and Colonel Francis Nicholson's planned assault on Quebec City. The male Abenaki warriors of the village were called up to Quebec to take part in the defence of the city while the woman and children were temporarily relocated to Trois-Rivières and Montreal. Following the failure and withdrawal of Admiral Walker's fleet, the Abenaki would once again return to Odanak. In 1715, the village would be relocated once more. This time moving further downstream to the site of its current location situated high upon the bank of the St. François River to protect against seasonal flooding.

Following the conclusion of Dummer's War in 1725, Odanak would be further reinforced by the arrival of a contingent of 300 Abenaki warriors and their families from the Narransouac and Pentagouet missions in Maine.

On 4 October 1759, Odanak was sacked and destroyed by a contingent of 200 men under the command of Major Robert Rogers. Rogers was ordered by Jeffery Amherst to seek retaliation for numerous raids and attacks perpetrated by Abenaki warriors on British settlements. Rogers was able to take advantage of the absence of the majority of Abenaki warriors who were serving under the command of French General Montcalm in the defense of Quebec City. Rogers men subsequently destroyed and set fire to entirety of the village destroying the mission's records and archives. Casualty estimates from this attack vary considerably depending on the accounts with Roger's claiming 200 dead and 20 captives (both women and children) while French accounts claim 30 dead, 20 of whom were identified as being women and children. This would mark the last major event that took place during the era of New France.

The Androscoggin were relocated west at St. Francis, Canada. During the French and Indian War (the Seven Years' War), this settlement was destroyed and burnt by Rogers' Rangers in 1759. The Abenaki and some St. Francis residents participated in raids against English settlements. These were sometimes organized by Sébastien Rale and Abenaki chief Grey Lock in Dummer's War along the frontiers of New England in the early 18th century. Other Abenaki tribes suffered several severe defeats in reprisal during Father Rale's War, particularly the capture of Norridgewock in 1724 and the defeat of the Pequawket in 1725, which greatly reduced their numbers.

== Demographics ==
=== Population ===
Population estimates prior to 1759 are difficult due to the loss of records associated with the raid conducted by Major Rogers on 4 October 1759.

Population trend:

Census	Population	Change (%)
2021	481	▲7.1%
2016	449	▼1.6%
2011	457	▼2.6%
2006	469	▲10.4%
2001	425	▲8.4%
1996	392	▲17.7%
1991	333	▲27.1%
1986	262	▲14.9%
1981	228	0%
1976	228	▲6%
1971	215	▼10%
1966	239	▲10.6%
1961	216	▼13.6%
1956	250	▲11.1%
1951	225	▼26.9%
1941	308	▼2.2%
1931	315	▼7.9%
1921	342	N/A
1749	200 warriors + families	N/A
1711	260 warriors + families or 300 inhabitants + 260 warriors	N/A
1698	335 (census of mission prior to relocation)	N/A

=== Language ===
Mother tongue language (2021)

Language	Population	Pct (%)
French only	435	90.6%
English only	35	7.3%
Both English and French	5	1%
Other languages	5	1%

== Arts and culture ==
Odanak is the site of the Musée des Abénakis (Abenaki Museum), dedicated to the history, culture, and art of the Western Abenaki people.

Alanis Obomsawin (Abenaki), is a filmmaker who grew up in Odanak. Her documentary, Waban-Aki: People from Where the Sun Rises (2006) is a tribute to the people of St. Francis. Her most recent documentary film Gene Boy Came Home (2007) tells the story of Eugene "Gene Boy" Benedict. He was raised in Odanak. As a young man, he fought in the US Marine Corps against the North Vietnamese in the Vietnam War before returning to his home village.

== Education ==
In 2011, the only First Nations CEGEP, or publicly funded college, in Québec opened its doors in Odanak.

== Notable people ==
- Alanis Obomsawin (born 1932), filmmaker, musician, singer
- Christine Sioui-Wawanoloath, writer and artist living in Quebec
- Elijah Tahamont (1855–1918), silent film actor Dark Cloud
- Alexis Wawanoloath, member of National Assembly of Quebec
- Michelle O'Bonsawin, first Indigenous Supreme Court Justice in Canadian history
- Mali Obomsawin, musician, community organizer
- Théophile Panadis (1889-1966), storyteller and Person of National Historic Significance.

== See also ==
- List of municipalities in Quebec
