= Peter Wolf Toth =

American sculptor (born 1947)

- Born: December 1947 (age 78); Hungary
- Known for: Wood carving
- Notable work: Trail of the Whispering Giants

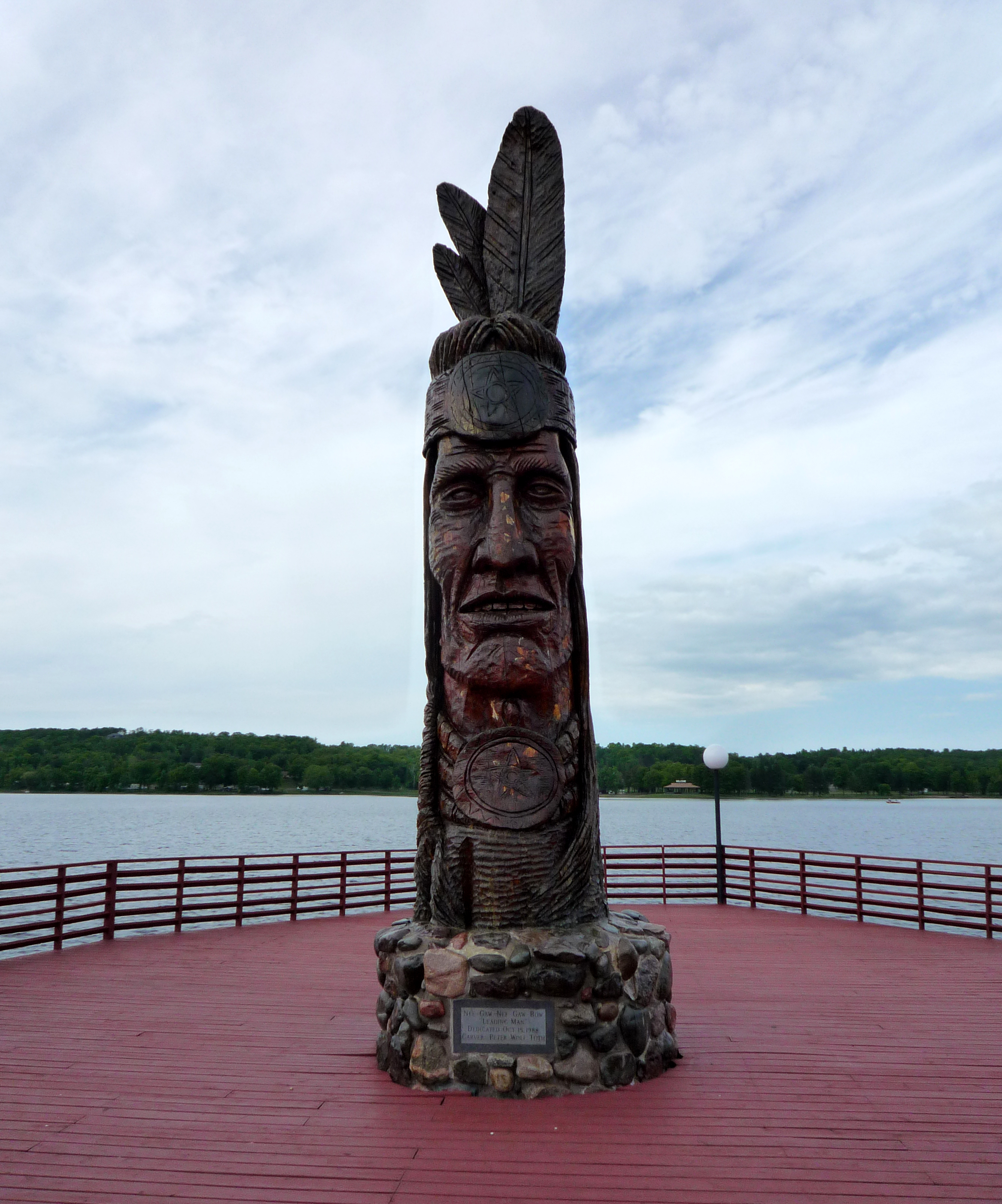
Toth's Nee-Gaw-Nee-Gaw-Bow (Leading Man, 1988) in Wakefield, Michigan was carved from one piece of pine donated by the Ottawa National Forest.

Peter Wolf Toth (born December 1947) is an American sculptor. Born in Hungary, Toth immigrated to the United States and settled in Akron, Ohio. He later studied art at Ohio University. He created a series of sculptures called Trail of the Whispering Giants to honor Native Americans. He has created more than 74 sculptures, including at least one in each state of the United States, and in several provinces and territories of Canada.

== Trail of the Whispering Giants ==
Toth completed his first sculpture, of stone, in La Jolla, California in February 1972. The sculpture of a Native American head, measuring nearly 6 feet (1.8 m) in height from chin to forehead, was carved into a sandstone cliff located between Marine Street and Windansea Beach, and represented three months of work.

Thereafter, he decided to embark upon a journey to create a sculpture in each state. His second sculpture was located in Sand Run Metropolitan Park in his American hometown of Akron, Ohio, which has since been destroyed and not replaced. Since then he has completed a statue in each of the 50 states, and in several provinces of Canada. Some states now have more than one sculpture. Florida has three sculptures located in Fort Lauderdale, Punta Gorda and another which was moved from Hollywood, FL, to Fort Lauderdale. Toth has replaced some destroyed sculptures with new ones, but not all. Peter Toth's mission to carve a "Whispering Giant" in all 50 United States was completed in May 1988, when he finished sculpture #58 in Hawaii.

Since then, Toth has continued his mission of honoring oppressed peoples in general and the American Indian in particular. His most recent Whispering Giant, #74, was completed in 2009 in Vincennes, Indiana. All are dedicated to the American Indian excepting #73 which is of Medieval King Stephen in Delegyhaza, Hungary, Toth's country of birth.

The largest sculptures stand over 20 feet (6.1 m) in height, with some exceeding 50 feet (15 m). When discussing his interpretation of what to sculpt for his Winslow, Arizona, project, Toth had this to say:

"I study the Indians of the area, then visualize an Indian within the log. It is a composite of all the native people of the state."

== After 1988 ==
Toth continues to plan further sculptures in other countries, and also spends time making repairs and performing maintenance on the existing sculptures. He has created replacement sculptures where statues have been damaged.
