= History of New Hampshire =

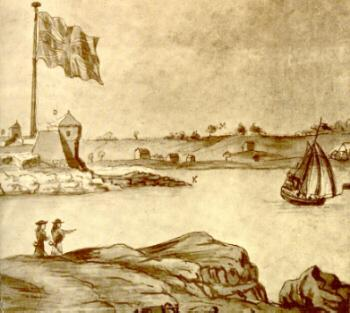
Fort William and Mary, 1705

New Hampshire was named after the English county of Hampshire.

New Hampshire is a state in the New England region of the northeastern United States. It has 234 municipalities. It is the 41st state by population (approximately 1,400,000) and the 46th by area. During the American Revolution, it was one of the Thirteen Colonies that revolted against British rule. Since the 20th century, the state has been known for its presidential primary, outdoor recreation, prestigious educational boarding schools, and its biotech industry.

== Precolonial period ==
Various Algonquian-speaking Abenaki tribes, largely divided between the Androscoggin, Ko'asek and Pennacook nations, lived in the area as long as 12,000 years before European settlement. Despite the similar language, they had a very different culture and religion from other Algonquian peoples. English and French explorers visited New Hampshire in 1600–1605, and David Thompson settled at Odiorne's Point in present-day Rye in 1623.

== Colonial period ==
In 1622, the Council for New England granted all the land between the Merrimack River and Kennebec River to Captain John Mason (former governor of Newfoundland) and Sir Ferdinando Gorges. Mason sent a group of colonists who arrived at Odiorne's Point in Rye (near Portsmouth) by a group of fishermen from England, under David Thompson in 1623, three years after the Pilgrims landed at Plymouth. Early historians believed the first native-born New Hampshirite, John Thompson, was born there. Thompson was followed a few years later by Edward and William Hilton. They led an expedition to the vicinity of Dover, which they called Northam. The first permanent European settlement was at Hilton's Point (present-day Dover), in 1623. This became known as the Upper Plantation.

In 1629, Mason and Gorges ended their partnership, and split their land at the Piscataqua River. Mason took the western half and named it New Hampshire, after the English county of Hampshire, one of the first Saxon shires. Hampshire was itself named after the port of Southampton, which was known previously as simply "Hampton". Gorges called the eastern half New Somersetshire, but it was also known as Maine. It would eventually become the core of the modern state of Maine, and the Piscataqua remains the southern portion of the boundary between Maine and New Hampshire. (Where in the river the boundary was to be drawn exactly, and thus which islands were included, was the subject of two U.S. Supreme Court cases in 1977 and 2001; see Piscataqua River border dispute.)

The Odiorne's Point settlement was abandoned in favor of Strawbery Banke (founded 1630) which became modern Portsmouth. This was known as the Lower Plantation. By 1631, the Upper Plantation comprised modern-day Dover, Durham and Stratham. The Upper and Lower Plantations had separate governors from 1630 to 1641. Captain Thomas Wiggin served as the first governor of the Upper Plantation.

Mason died in 1635 without ever seeing the colony he founded. Settlers from Pannaway, moving to the Portsmouth region later and combining with an expedition of the new Laconia Company (formed 1629) under Captain Neal, called their new settlement Strawbery Banke. In 1638, Exeter was founded by John Wheelwright.

Mason's colony was unprofitable and it was abandoned by his heirs. Settlers were divided as to whether they should remain independent or be governed by Massachusetts, which had also reasserted its claim to New Hampshire and Maine based on its original grant.137 A compact of governance was signed in 1639, which by 1641 put all New Hampshire towns under Massachusetts jurisdiction. Home rule of the towns was allowed. In 1653, Strawbery Banke petitioned the General Court of Massachusetts to change its name to Portsmouth, which was granted.

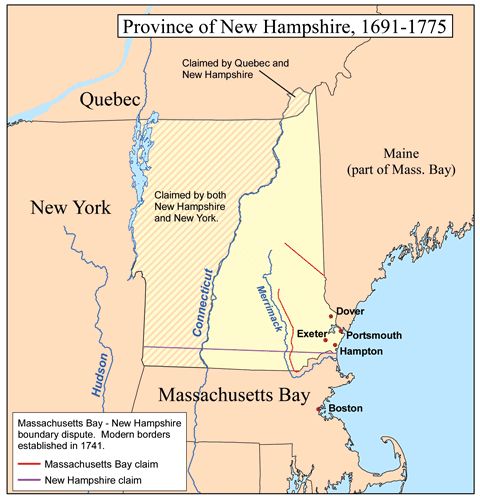
Map showing several claims and disputed borders, 1691–1775

The relationship between Massachusetts and the independent New Hampshirites was controversial and tenuous and complicated by land claims maintained by the heirs of John Mason. In 1679, King Charles II separated New Hampshire from Massachusetts, issuing a charter for the royal Province of New Hampshire, with John Cutt as governor. Cutt's administration was supposed to rule in favor of Robert Tufton Mason. When that did not happen, the Crown appointed Edward Cranfield as its royal enforcer. The backlash to his administration led to Gove's Rebellion. A consequence of the rebellion was that New Hampshire was absorbed into the Dominion of New England in 1686, which collapsed in 1689. After a brief period without formal government (the settlements were de facto ruled by Massachusetts) William III and Mary II issued a new provincial charter in 1691. From 1699 to 1741, the governors of Massachusetts were also commissioned as governors of New Hampshire.

The province's geography placed it on the frontier between British and French colonies in North America, and it was for many years subjected to native claims, especially in the central and northern portions of its territory. Because of these factors, it was on the front lines of many military conflicts, including King William's War, Queen Anne's War, Father Rale's War, Dummer's War, and King George's War. By the 1740s, most of the native population had either been killed or driven out of the province's territory.

Partly because New Hampshire's governorship was shared with that of Massachusetts, border issues between the two colonies were not completely settled for many years. As New Hampshire settlements expanded northward, the boundary with York County, Massachusetts (now Maine) became more important to delineate. King George II sent commissioners to perform a survey. They declared the eastern boundary of New Hampshire extended to the headwaters of the Salmon Falls River where it exits Great East Lake, and extends 120 miles north of the mouth of the Piscataqua River, along a line two degrees west of due north. This deviation from north approximately prevents curvature of the line on maps drawn to a different center meridian (such as the center of the colony). The Treaty of Paris of 1783, ending the Revolutionary War, declared the border with Canada as beginning at "the northwestern head of the Connecticut River", but the lack of precision in the terminology left the exact border unresolved until 1842.

Territory west of the Merrimack River was highly disputed. Issuers of the Massachusetts and New Hampshire charters had incorrectly believed the river to flow primarily from west to east. In the 1730s New Hampshire political interest led by Lieutenant Governor John Wentworth were able to raise the profile of these issues to colonial officials and the crown in London, even while Governor and Massachusetts native Jonathan Belcher preferentially granted land to Massachusetts interests in the disputed area. In 1741, King George II ruled that the border with southern Massachusetts (Maine was then also part of Massachusetts) was approximately what it is today, and also separated the governorships of the two provinces. Benning Wentworth in 1741 became the first non-Massachusetts governor since Edward Cranfield succeeded John Cutt in the 1680s.

Wentworth promptly complicated New Hampshire's territorial claims by interpreting the provincial charter to include territory west of the Connecticut River and began issuing land grants in this territory, which was also claimed by the Province of New York. The so-called New Hampshire Grants area became a subject of contention from the 1740s until the 1790s when it was admitted to the United States as the state of Vermont in 1791.

=== Slavery in New Hampshire ===
As in the other Thirteen Colonies and elsewhere in the colonial Americas, racially conditioned slavery was a firmly established institution in New Hampshire. The New Hampshire Assembly in 1714 passed "An Act To Prevent Disorders In The Night":

Whereas great disorders, insolencies and burglaries, are ofttimes raised and committed in the night time, by Indian, Negro, and Molatto servants and slaves, to the Disquiet and hurt of her Majesty's good subjects: No Indian, Negro, or Molatto servant or slave, may presume to absent from the families where they respectively belong, or be found abroad in the night time after nine o'clock; unless it is upon errand for their respective masters or owners.

Notices emphasizing and re-affirming the curfew were published in The New Hampshire Gazette in 1764 and 1771.

"Furthermore, as one of the few colonies that did not impose a tariff on slaves, New Hampshire became a base for slaves to be imported into America and then smuggled into other colonies. Every census up to the Revolution showed an increase in the black population, though they remained proportionally fewer than in most other New England colonies."

Following the Revolution, a powerfully-written petition of 1779 sent by 20 slaves in Portsmouth—members of what historian Ira Berlin identified as the revolutionary generations of enslaved people in his pivotal work Many Thousands Gone—unsuccessfully requested freedom for the enslaved. The New Hampshire legislature would not officially eliminate slavery in the state until 1857, long after the death of many of the signatories. The 1840 United States census was the last to enumerate any slaves in the households of the state.

While the number of slaves resident in New Hampshire itself dwindled during the 19th century, the state's economy remained closely interlinked with, and dependent upon, the economies of the slave states. Slave-produced raw materials, such as cotton for textiles, and slave-manufactured goods were imported. The ship Nightingale of Boston, built in Eliot, Maine in 1851 and outfitted in Portsmouth, would serve as a slave ship before its capture by the African Slave Trade Patrol in 1861, indicating the region's further economic connection to the ongoing Atlantic slave trade.

== Revolution: 1774–1815 ==
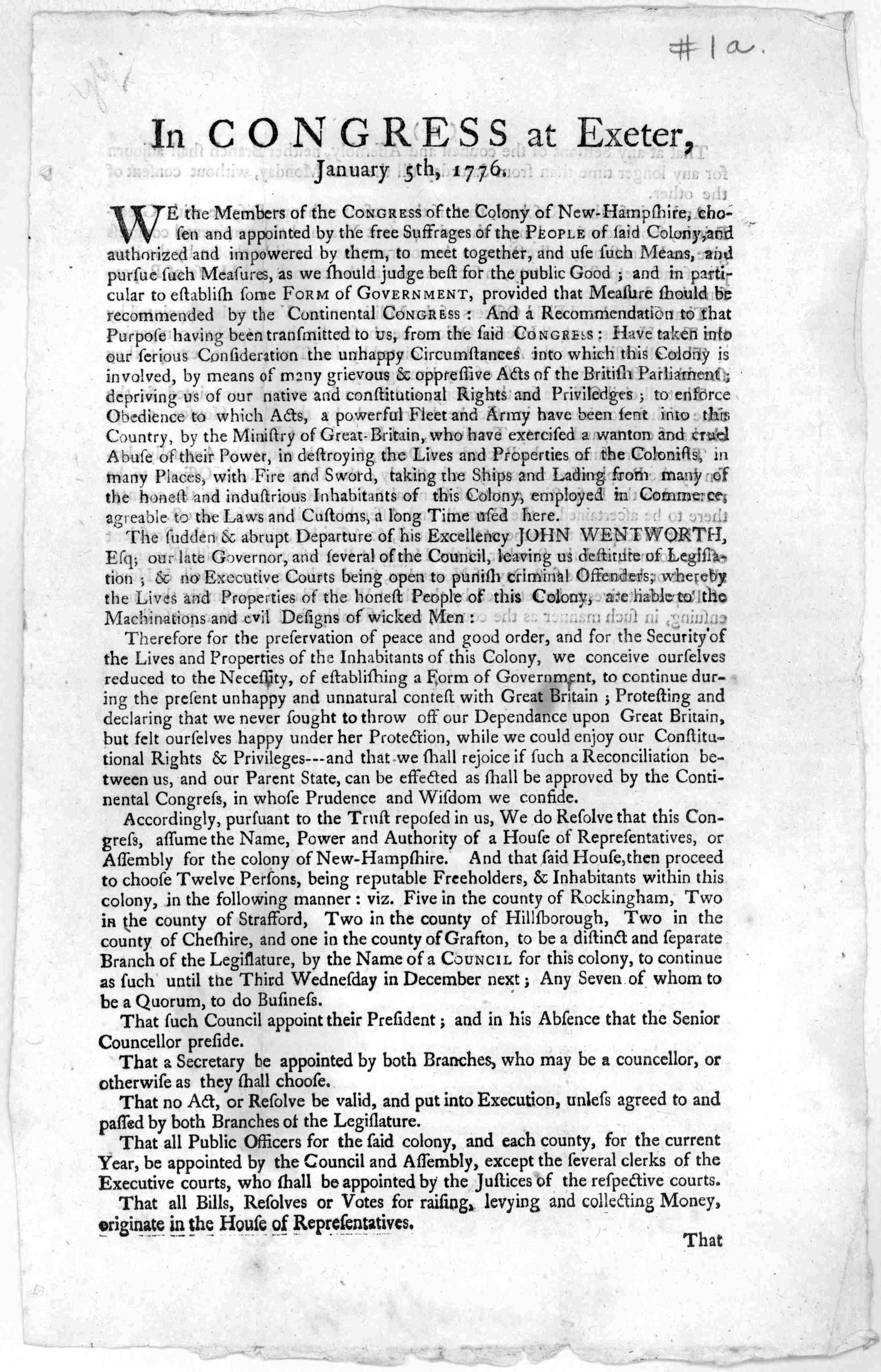
Broadside statement of Congress of the Colony of New Hampshire, referencing "sudden & abrupt departure" of Royal Governor John Wentworth, January 1776

The only battle fought in New Hampshire was the raid on Fort William and Mary, December 14, 1774, in Portsmouth Harbor, which netted the rebellion sizable quantities of gunpowder, small arms, and cannon over the course of two nights. (General Sullivan, leader of the raid, described it as "remainder of the powder, the small arms, bayonets, and cartouche-boxes, together with the cannon and ordnance stores".) This raid was preceded by a warning to local patriots the previous day, by Paul Revere on December 13, 1774, that the fort was to be reinforced by troops sailing from Boston. According to unverified accounts, the gunpowder was later used at the Battle of Bunker Hill, transported there by Major Demerit, who was one of several New Hampshire patriots who stored the powder in their homes until it was transported elsewhere for use in revolutionary activities. During the raid, the fort's garrison fired upon the rebels with cannon and muskets. Although there were apparently no casualties, these were among the first shots in the American Revolutionary period, occurring approximately five months before the Battles of Lexington and Concord. On January 5, 1776, New Hampshire became the first colony to declare independence from Great Britain, almost six months before the Declaration of Independence was signed by the Continental Congress.

New Hampshire was one of the Thirteen Colonies that revolted against British rule during the American Revolution. The Massachusetts Provincial Congress called upon the other New England colonies for assistance in raising an army. In response, on May 22, 1775, the New Hampshire Provincial Congress voted to raise a volunteer force to join the patriot army at Boston. In January 1776, it became the first colony to set up an independent government and the first to establish a constitution, but the latter explicitly stated "we never sought to throw off our dependence on Great Britain", meaning that it was not the first to actually declare its independence (that distinction instead belongs to Rhode Island). The historic attack on Fort William and Mary (now Fort Constitution) helped supply the cannon and ammunition for the Continental Army that was needed for the Battle of Bunker Hill that took place north of Boston a few months later. New Hampshire raised three regiments for the Continental Army, the 1st, 2nd and 3rd New Hampshire regiments. New Hampshire Militia units were called up to fight at the Battle of Bunker Hill, Battle of Bennington, Saratoga Campaign and the Battle of Rhode Island. John Paul Jones' ship the sloop-of-war USS Ranger and the frigate USS Raleigh were built in Portsmouth, New Hampshire, along with other naval ships for the Continental Navy and privateers to attack British merchant shipping.

Concord was named the state capital in 1808.

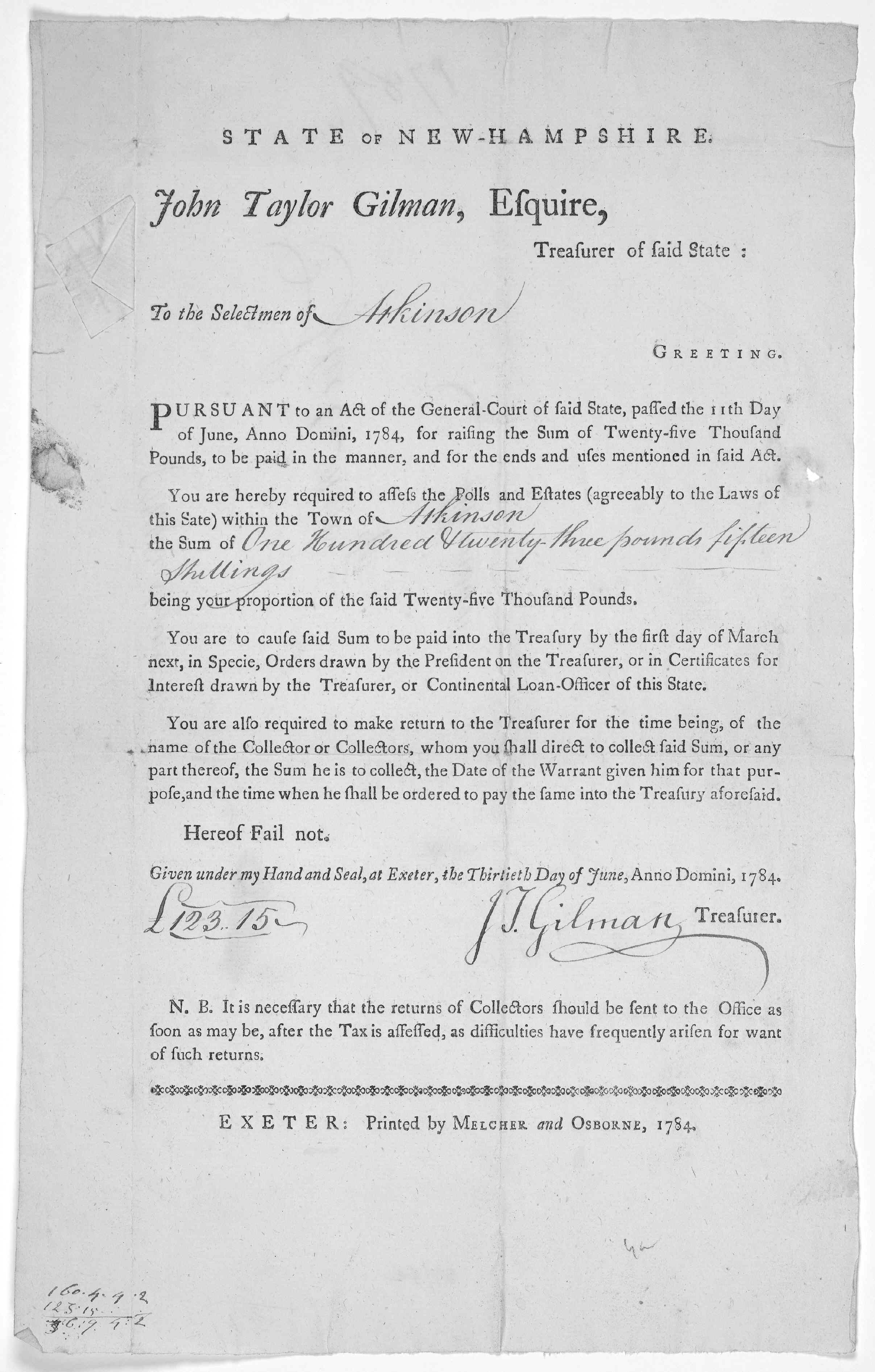
Order by John Taylor Gilman, State Treasurer and later Governor, 1784

== Industrialization, abolitionism and nativism politics: 1815–1860 ==
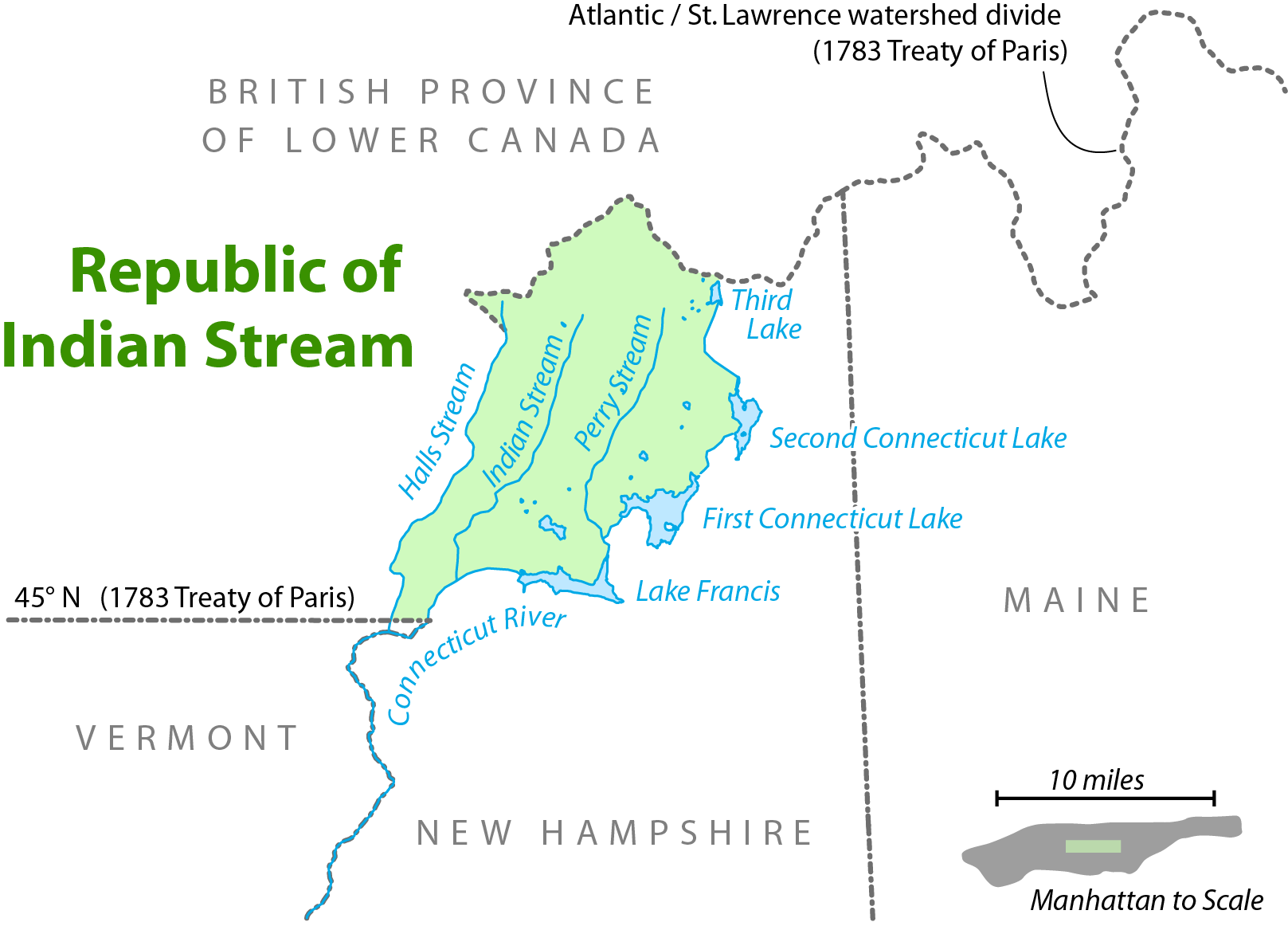
Map of the Republic of Indian Stream

In 1832, New Hampshire saw a curious development: the founding of the Republic of Indian Stream on its northern border with Canada over the unresolved post-revolutionary war border issue. In 1835 the so-called "republic" was annexed by New Hampshire, with the dispute finally resolved in 1842 by the Webster–Ashburton Treaty. This set the border as Halls Stream from the 45th parallel north to the continental divide between the St. Lawrence River and the Atlantic Ocean southeast of the mainland (which makes up the remainder of the New Hampshire-Quebec border).

Abolitionists from Dartmouth College founded the experimental, interracial Noyes Academy in Canaan, New Hampshire, in 1835, at a point in history when slaves still appeared in the households of New Hampshire in the census. Rural opponents of the school eventually dragged the school away with oxen before lighting it ablaze to protest integrated education, within months of the school's founding.

Abolitionist sentiment was a strong undercurrent in the state, with significant support given the Free Soil Party of John P. Hale. However the conservative Jacksonian Democrats usually maintained control, under the leadership of editor Isaac Hill.

Nativism aimed at the rapid influx of Irish Catholics characterized the short-lived secret Know Nothing movement, and its instrument the "American Party." Appearing out of nowhere, they scored a landslide in 1855. They won 51% of the vote against a divided opposition. They won over 94% of the men who voted Free Soil the year before. They won 79% of the Whigs, plus 15% of Democrats and 24% of those who abstained in the 1854 election for governor. In full control of the legislature, the Know Nothings enacted their entire agenda. According to Lex Renda, they battled traditionalism and promoted rapid modernization. They extended the waiting period for citizenship to slow down the growth of Irish power; they reformed the state courts. They expanded the number and power of banks; they strengthened corporations; they defeated a proposed 10-hour law that would help workers. They reformed the tax system; increased state spending on public schools; set up a system to build high schools; prohibited the sale of liquor; and they denounced the expansion of slavery in the western territories.

The Whigs and Free Soil parties both collapsed in New Hampshire in 1854–55. In the 1855 fall elections the Know Nothings again swept the state against the Democrats and the small new Republican party. When the Know Nothing ("American" Party) collapsed in 1856 and merged with the Republicans, New Hampshire now had a two party system with the Republican Party headed by Amos Tuck edging out the Democrats.

== Civil War: 1861–1865 ==
After Abraham Lincoln gave speeches in March 1860, he was well regarded. However, the radical wing of the Republican Party increasingly took control. As early as January 1861, top officials were secretly meeting with Governor John A. Andrew of Massachusetts to coordinate plans in case the war came. Plans were made to rush militia units to Washington in an emergency.

New Hampshire fielded 31,650 soldiers and 836 officers during the American Civil War; of these, about 20% died of disease, accident or combat wounds. The state provided eighteen volunteer infantry regiments (thirteen of which were raised in 1861 in response to Lincoln's call to arms), three rifle regiments (who served in the 1st United States Sharpshooters and 2nd United States Sharpshooters), one cavalry battalion (the 1st New Hampshire Volunteer Cavalry, which was attached to the 1st New England Volunteer Cavalry), and two artillery units (the 1st New Hampshire Light Battery and 1st New Hampshire Heavy Artillery), as well as additional troops for the Navy and Marine Corps.

Among the most celebrated of New Hampshire's units was the 5th New Hampshire Volunteer Infantry, commanded by Colonel Edward Ephraim Cross. Called the "Fighting Fifth" in newspaper accounts, the regiment was considered among the Union's best both during the war (Major General Winfield Scott called the regiment "refined gold" in 1863) and by historians afterward. The Civil War veteran and early Civil War historian William F. Fox determined that this regiment had the highest number of battle-related deaths of any Union regiment. The 20th-century historian Bruce Catton said that the Fifth New Hampshire was "one of the best combat units in the army" and that Cross was "an uncommonly talented regimental commander."

The critical post of state Adjutant General was held in 1861–1864 by elderly politician Anthony C. Colby (1792–1873) and his son Daniel E. Colby (1816–1891). They were patriotic, but were overwhelmed with the complexity of their duties. The state had no track of soldiers who enlisted after 1861; no personnel records or information on volunteers, substitutes, or draftees. There was no inventory of weaponry and supplies. Nathaniel Head (1828–1883) took over in 1864, obtained an adequate budget and office staff, and reconstructed the missing paperwork. As a result, widows, orphans, and veterans who served, received the postwar payments they had earned.

== Prosperity, depression and war: 1865–1950 ==
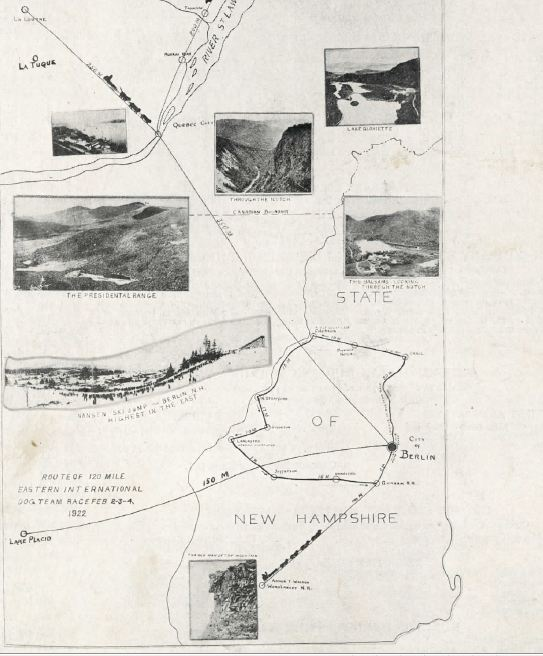
1922 map of New Hampshire published in the bulletin of the Brown Company in Berlin

Between 1884 and 1903, New Hampshire attracted many immigrants. French Canadian migration to the state was significant, and at the turn of the century, French Canadians represented 16 percent of the state's population, and one-fourth the population of Manchester. Polish immigration to the state was also significant; there were about 850 Polish Americans in Manchester in 1902. Joseph Laurent, a 19th/early 20th century Abenaki chief, immigrated from Quebec, wrote an Abenaki English language dictionary, set up an Indian trading post and served as its postmaster. Today the Intervale site has been listed on the National Register of Historic Places.

The textile industry was hit hard by the depression and growing competition from southern mills. The closing of the Amoskeag Mills in 1935 was a major blow to Manchester, as was the closing of the former Nashua Manufacturing Company mill in Nashua in 1949 and the bankruptcy of the Brown Company paper mill in Berlin in the 1940s, which led to new ownership.

== Modern New Hampshire: 1950–present ==
The post-World War II decades have seen New Hampshire increase its economic and cultural links with the greater Boston, Massachusetts, region. This reflects a national trend, in which improved highway networks have helped metropolitan areas expand into formerly rural areas or small nearby cities.

The replacement of the Nashua textile mill with defense electronics contractor Sanders Associates in 1952 and the arrival of minicomputer giant Digital Equipment Corporation in the early 1970s helped lead the way toward southern New Hampshire's role as a high-tech adjunct of the Route 128 corridor.

The postwar years also saw the rise of New Hampshire's political primary for President of the United States, which as the first primary in the quadrennial campaign season draws enormous attention.

== See also ==
- Abenaki
- History of New England
- List of historical societies in New Hampshire
- List of newspapers in New Hampshire in the 18th century
- New Hampshire historical markers
- Timeline of Manchester, New Hampshire
- Union (American Civil War)

== Resources ==
- Online books: New Hampshire
- New Hampshire: a Guide to the Granite State: "Chronology". Boston: Houghton Mifflin American Guide Series. Federal Writers' Project (1938)
