= Cowasuck =

Algonquian-speaking Native American tribe

Goasək
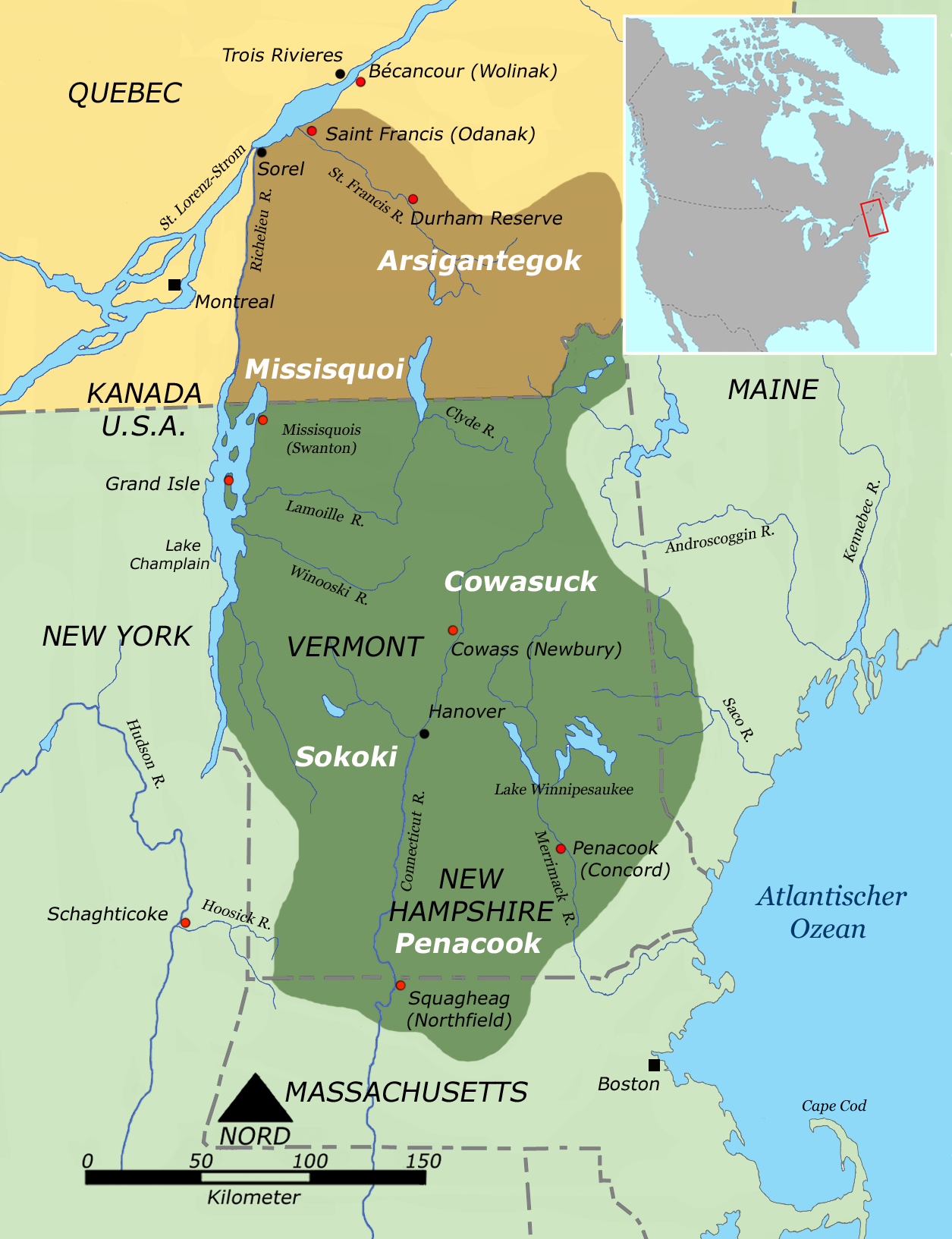
- Historical Cowasuck territory, c. 17th century

Total population
- Unknown, most merged with St. Francis Abenaki in the late 18th century

Regions with significant populations
- New Hampshire, Vermont, Quebec

Languages
- Abenaki language

Religion
- Indigenous religion, Roman Catholicism

Related ethnic groups
- other Western Abenaki people

The Cowasuck, also known as Cowass or Coosuc, were an Algonquian-speaking Native American tribe in northeastern North America. Cowasuck was also the name of their primary settlement.

Linguistically and culturally the Cowasuck belonged to the Western Abenaki and the Wabanaki Confederacy. They were Western Abenaki who lived in and around the village of Cowass, which became Newbury, Vermont.

== Name ==
The name Cowasuck comes from the Abenaki word Goasek which means "White Pines Place", an area near Newbury, Vermont. The members of the tribe were called Goasiak (singular: Goasi), which means "the people of the white pines".

Variant spellings of the place name include Koés in French and Cohass, Cohoss, or Coos in English, and an alternate demonym is Cohassiac. Coös County, the northernmost county in New Hampshire, derives from the Wôbanakiak word.

== Territory ==
The Cowasuck formerly resided on the upper Connecticut River, with the main village of Cowasuck, now Newbury, located in the states of New Hampshire and Vermont. The river valley forest was a mixture of deciduous trees, hemlocks, and white pines, growing on light soils or old fields. The villages were typically set up on the edge of a cliff or terraces, near the alluvial land suitable for growing corn, and with nearby rivers with sufficient water supply All villages were close to a river or lake, which served for fishing and as a travel route. Their wigwams were rectangular, covered with bark, had domed roofs with a hole as a flue for each fire, and had room for several families.

N’dakinna, "homeland" in Western Abenaki, is of central importance to the Cowasuck Abenaki people.

== History ==
Northeast Woodland Tribal presence of this region existed long before European settlement, as evidenced by a nearly 13,000-year-old Indigenous village found in Keene, New Hampshire demonstrating that Paleo-Indians were present in the region from around the end of the last ice age.

=== 16th century ===
Indigenous peoples lived along the Kwenitekw (Connecticut River/Long River) and its tributaries, along what is known today as the central borderlands of Vermont and New Hampshire. They are written about in colonial documents dating from the 17th century.

=== 17th century ===
French colonists wrote early accounts of the Western Abenaki, but the French preoccupation consisted of proselytizing and fighting the English. However, the French practice of calling the Cowasuck by the name Penacook, led to misunderstandings in their reports.This however is not mentioned in another authoritative source on the Penacook. The tribes of the Western Abenaki were referred to by the names of each individual group. Cowasuck and Pennacook appeared to be distinct groups.

The first French priests of the Jesuit Order came to New France around 1611. Unlike the grey-robed Puritans in New England, the Jesuits did not try to assimilate Native people into French society. From Abenaki oral history suggests that French missionaries were active since 1615 in Abenaki villages on the shores of Lake Champlain.

Jesuit Fathers often acted both as military and political agents of the French crown and as servants of God. They traveled alone in the Indigenous land, visited the villages of the Abenaki, and took part in the life of the Indigenous people. Some of them, like Father Sébastien Rale, became intimate connoisseurs of Native American culture. He produced an extensive dictionary of the Abenaki language.

The missionaries learned the language of the Native Americans, adopted their style of speech, and tried as far as possible to follow their customs and manners. They had no interest in the Abenaki land, in their women, or in the fur trade. Their poverty and devotion were respected and their courage, as well as their apparent immunity to the diseases that the communities healers faced helplessly, was admired by the natives. They shared the lives of the Indigenous peoples and earned their trust, although their missionary vocation demanded that they renounce Native American culture, the disempowerment of religious leaders, and the spiritual and social revolution. The missionaries were the lawyers for the Abenaki and helped them to better overcome the differences between Native American and European cultures. Sometimes they also represented the Abenaki in negotiations with the English. Men like Sébastien Rale became central figures in the Abenaki story. Soon the Abenaki were reputed to be the most pious Catholics and to be among the most loyal Native American friends of New France.

=== 18th century ===
The Cowasuck numbered around 300 in the early 18th century, but this includes different groups passing through the Cowass area, an important area connecting Canada and the Coastal United States. In 1704, Cowasucks sent representatives to meet with the Governor-General of New France Philippe de Rigaud, Marquis de Vaudreuil in Quebec. He suggested they move north to Quebec to avoid the English; however, they declined this opportunity. At that time Mohegans attacked residents of Cowass. Cowasucks likely fled to a remote area. In 1712, Cowass was deserted, and French maps from 1713 and 1715 labelled Cowass as "Koēs, ancien village des loups" and it was likely later reoccupied after peace resumed, which was a common Abenaki strategy for the time. At that time Mohegans attached residents of Cowass.

The era was marked by warfare, including the French and Indian War of 1754 to 1763, in which the Abenaki sided with the French, and the American Revolutionary War. While many Western Abenaki tried to remain neutral during the Revolutionary War, others joined in both sides of the war. Historian Colin G. Calloway wrote: "Traditionally, the final quarter of the eighteenth century stands as the time when the last western Abenaki disappeared from Vermont and New Hampshire, when the few survivors finally pulled up their roots and followed their relatives to Canada." However, he points out that some remained in Vermont during the Revolutionary War.

By 1798, most Cowasuck had joined the St. Francis Abenaki in Quebec, while hunting and fishing in their previous territories in New Hampshire.

=== 19th century ===
Joseph Laurent, an Abenaki chief (sôgmô) from Odanak, Quebec, moved to Intervale, New Hampshire in the late 19th century, maintained an Indian trading post and became a local postmaster. His former trading post is now a U.S. historical site. Laurent also wrote an Abenaki English dialogs dictionary.

== State-recognized tribes and heritage groups ==
Vermont has designated four state-recognized tribes, all of which identify as being Abenaki, and two specifically identify as being descendants of the Cowasuck people. Vermont recognized the Nulhegan Band of the Coosuk Abenaki Nation in 2011 and the Koasek Koas Abenaki Tribe in 2012.

New Hampshire has the New Hampshire State Commission on Native American Affairs but no state-recognized tribes.

Several organizations that self-identify as Native American tribes who identify as being Cowasuck are active in Vermont and New Hampshire; however, their claims to Abenaki ancestry are disputed. One NH group and its (sôgmô) requires native lineage proof.

One unrecognized organization, the Cowasuck Band-Abenaki People of Franklin, Massachusetts sent a letter of intent to petition for federal recognition as a Native American tribe in 1995 but have not followed through with a petition. The Ko'asek (Co'wasuck) Traditional Band of the Sovereign Abenaki Nation, a cultural heritage group with 430 members(2021), owns 10 acres in Claremont used for ceremonies.

== See also ==
- List of Native American peoples in the United States
