= Northeast Coast campaign (1750) =

The Northeast Coast campaign of 1750 occurred during Father Le Loutre's War from 11 September to December 1750. The Norridgewock as well as the Abenaki from St. Francois and Trois-Rivières, Quebec raided British settlements along the Acadia/ New England border in present-day Maine.

== Historical context ==
By the end of King George's War, there was a long history of the Wabanaki Confederacy and the Abenaki from Quebec attacking British settlements encroaching toward the border of Acadia, the Kennebec River. On October 28, 1748, at the end of King George's War, the Acadians and Mi'kmaq prevented John Gorham from landing to acquire an oath of allegiance. His rangers were fired upon; killing three of the rangers and wounding three, while Gorham took two Mi'kmaq prisoner. In response, Roland-Michel Barrin de La Galissonière, the governor of New France indicated that, in retaliation for British aggression, the native raids on the border may resume. At this time Mi'kmaq were given arms at Quebec to attack Fort St. Georges.

The Wabanaki Confederacy of Acadia retaliated for the founding of Halifax by attacking New England settlements along the coast of present-day Maine, below the Kennebec River, the former border of Acadia. In 1750, the natives attacked Falmouth killing one on June 8, 1750. In July 1750, natives took seven prisoners captive at New Meadows.

== Campaign ==
Wabanaki conducted the 1750 campaign against 10 settlements killing 2 and taking captive 24 people starting on 11 September. Tarrantines were suspected of being involved on the raid on Fort Richmond. Wabanaki raided Richmond (Fort Richmond), Dresden, Swan Island, Wikcasset, Sheepscot, Parker's Island, Georgetown, Maquoit, Windham, Gorhamtown, and New Gloucester.

On September 8, on Swan Island near Fort Richmond, 60 Norridgewock and St. Francis natives attacked two families who were in one dwelling, two were saved while 14 were taken captive. Later the same day the natives began to attack the fort for three hours, which had seven soldiers defending it. As they withdrew that took one prisoner and burned crops. On September 9, they attacked Wiscasset and Sheepscot, where they took two captives. September 10, they took captive a man at Berwick. On September 11, there is a report that natives attacked Fort Richmond for 2–3 days, killing cattle and taking off 12-13 cattle. On Sept 21, natives attacked New Marblehead (Windham) and captured one prisoner. By Sept. 26, along the border, natives captured 17 people on the border, wounded two and killed one.

== Aftermath ==
In the spring of 1751, the natives captured three boys at New Yarmouth. On June 8, natives killed a man close to Falmouth. In July, natives took seven prisoners at New Meadows. Toward the end of June, they again attacked Fort Richmond. Two weeks later they took captive 6 men and killed 1.

There was a Peace Treaty of 1752 signed August 3 at Fort St. Georges. The Mi'kmaq and the St. Francois natives were not present.

The raids continued once the British started to establish forts along the Kennebec River in 1754. During the war, along the former border of Acadia, the Kennebec River, the British built Fort Halifax (Winslow), Fort Shirley (Dresden, formerly Frankfurt) and Fort Western (Augusta).
