= Intervale, New Hampshire =

Unincorporated community in New Hampshire, United States

- Unincorporated community
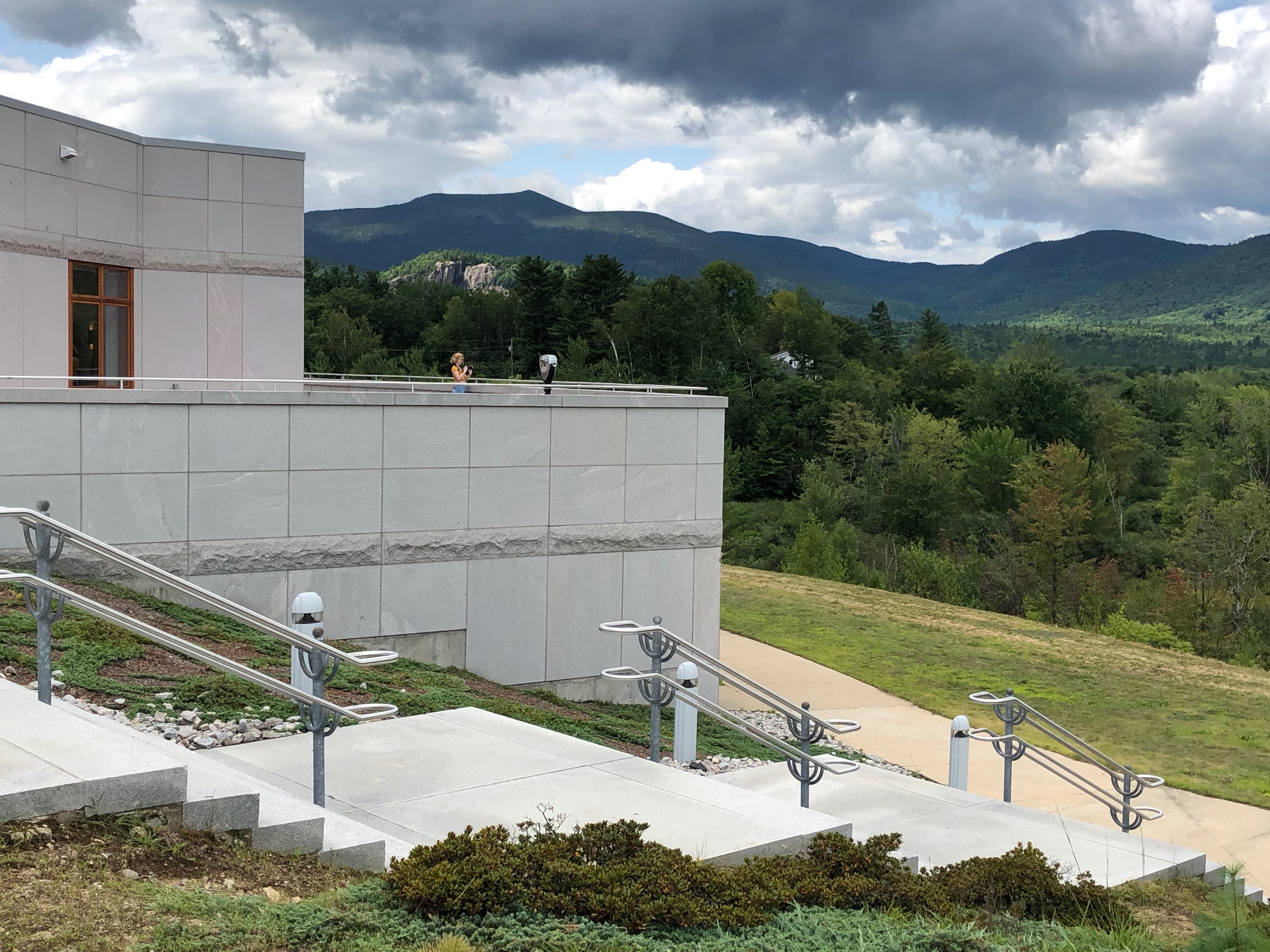
- The Intervale Scenic Vista along US 302 and NH 16

- Location within New Hampshire Location within the United States
- Coordinates: 44°04′36″N 71°08′21″W
- Country: United States
- State: New Hampshire
- County: Carroll
- Towns: Bartlett, Conway
- Elevation: 554 ft (169 m)
- Time zone: UTC-5 (Eastern (EST))
  - Summer (DST): UTC-4 (EDT)
- ZIP code: 03845
- Area code: 603
- GNIS feature ID: 872079

Intervale is an unincorporated community in Carroll County, New Hampshire, United States, located on the boundary between the towns of Bartlett and Conway in the White Mountains Region. The village is part of the Mount Washington Valley, a resort area that also includes the communities of North Conway and Jackson. The village has a separate ZIP code (03845) from surrounding communities in the Bartlett/Conway area.

Intervale is found along U.S. Route 302 and New Hampshire Route 16 at their intersection with Hurricane Mountain Road, 1.5 miles (2.4 km) north of the center of North Conway. New Hampshire Route 16A leads north from Intervale through the village of Lower Bartlett. A state highway rest area with a fine view of Mount Washington and the Presidential Range is located along Routes 302 and 16 in Intervale.

A former tourist's trading post run by Abenaki chief Joseph Laurent, the Abenaki Indian Shop and Camp, is located in Intervale near the state highway rest area and is listed on the National Register of Historic Places.

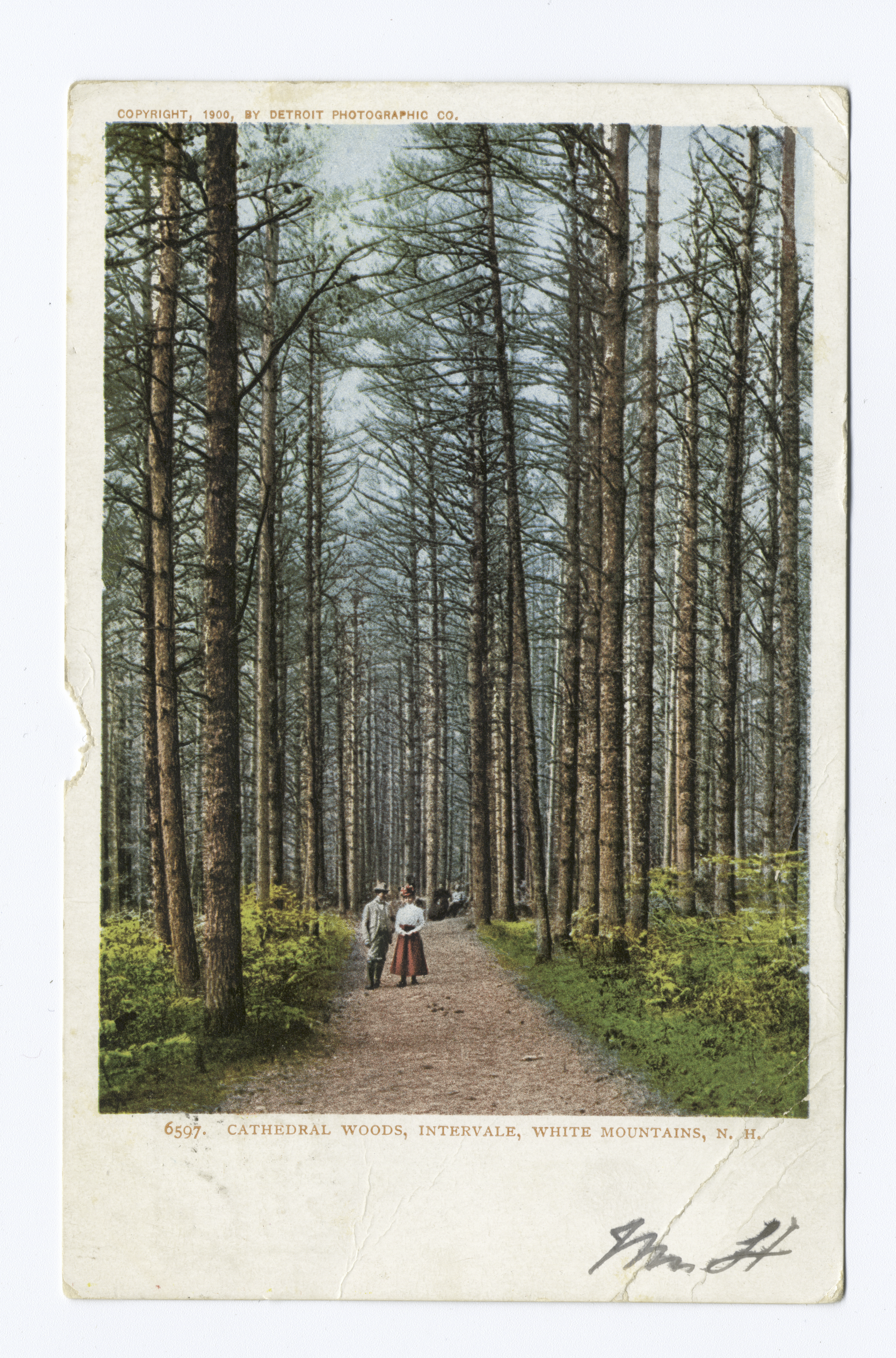
Cathedral Woods, Intervale

== See also ==
- New Hampshire Historical Marker No. 38: White Mountain School of Art (marker is located at the Intervale Scenic Vista)
