= Abenaki Indian Shop and Camp =

- U.S. National Register of Historic Places
- U.S. Historic district
- NH State Register of Historic Places
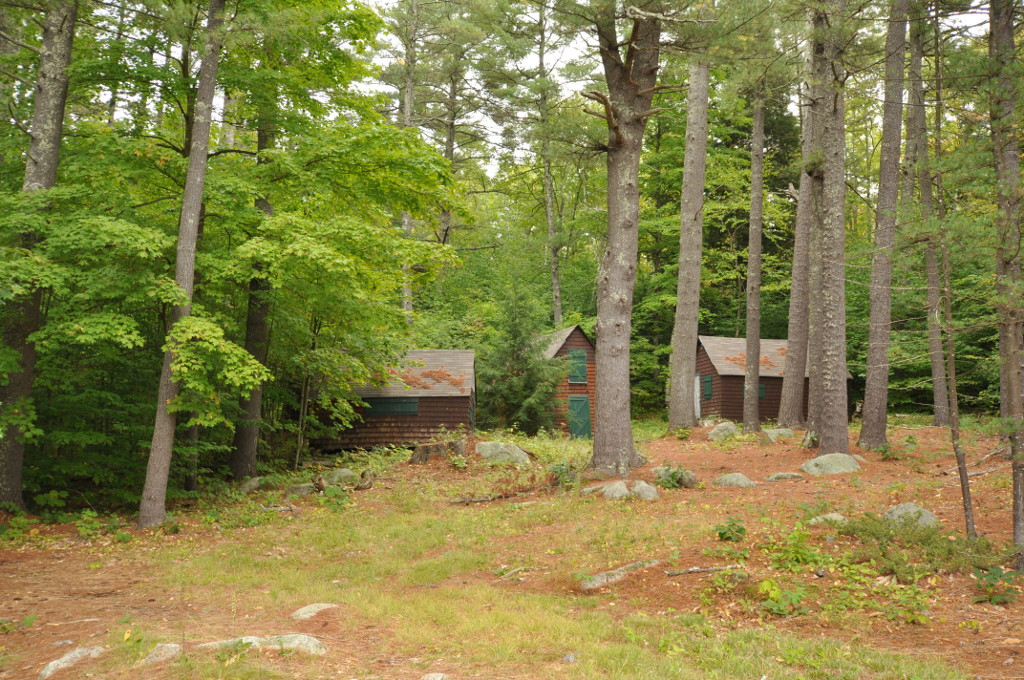
- Some of the cabins

- Location within New Hampshire Location within the United States
- Location: Intervale Crossroad, 1 mi. E of NH 16, Conway, New Hampshire
- Coordinates: 44°4′28″N 71°8′11″W
- Area: 3.8 acres (1.5 ha)
- Built: 1884
- Architect: Joseph Laurent
- NRHP reference No.: 91000218

Significant dates
- Added to NRHP: February 28, 1991
- Designated NHSRHP: July 1, 1992 (Note: Date listed by the New Hampshire Division of Historical Resources appears to pre-date establishment of the State Register (2001).)

The Abenaki Indian Shop and Camp is a historic Native American site in the Intervale section of Conway, New Hampshire. The site was listed on the National Register of Historic Places in 1991 and has also been listed on the New Hampshire State Register of Historic Places. It is located on Intervale Cross Road, about one mile east of New Hampshire Route 16, and is now a local public park. The area of the camp is in a grove of white pines known as Cathedral Woods.^{4} At the southern end is a single-story wood-frame building with a gabled roof, and a descriptive plaque set in a stone. A short way north of this are a grouping of small shingled gable-roofed cabins, set around a clearing in the woods. The shop was originally a service shed built by the Maine Central Railroad; it was purchased by Chief Joseph Laurent around 1900. Laurent is also credited with construction of the cottages in which the Abenaki lived. Since 1985, the property has been owned by the town, which now operates it as a small park with interpretive signage describing its history. View the 90 page application for the NRHP here, which includes a lengthy description and photographs.

== History of the store and camp ==
Chief Joseph Laurent, an Abenaki leader from Odanak (St. Francis, Quebec), came to the area in 1884 with his family and with what he called a group of Sokoki families. He established a seasonal camp on the site, at the time owned by a local hotel. Here they created a tourist attraction where Laurent and other Abenaki produced baskets and handicrafts for the hotel guests. Laurent died in 1919 but the Abenaki returned yearly until 1960, just before Joseph Laurent's widow passed. Laurent’s two sons, Emanuel and Stephen, lived in the camp year-round from the 1940s. The business itself was continued into the late 20th century by Laurent's youngest son Stephen.

Stephen Laurent took up permanent residence at Intervale, was a postmaster in a nearby town, and played the cello and violin in local chamber groups. In 1952 he married Margaret (Emily M. Pfister) an Abenaki woman from this summer group. Upon Stephen's death in 2001, his nephew from Odanak, Deny Obomsawin, took over the store and camp. Obomsawin said the site was initially chosen by Laurent because it was located within their traditional homelands, Ndakina, before English settlement pushed them farther north to the very edge of Abenaki territory on the St. Lawrence River.

== Importance to the Abenaki ==
=== Historical importance: traditional homelands ===
The Laurents were descended from the area's original Native American population who were driven from the area during the US colonial period.

Intervale was one of many sites in the US where Abenaki returned from St. Francis to their homelands, set up seasonal camps, sold baskets and other handmade items and shared their culture; this history is told in the 90 page application for the NRHP. The application refers to this process as Post-Colonial Native American Indian Acculturation and Revitalization. Beginning in the 19th century, it is the first step of the Abenaki returning to their homelands and imbuing new life into Abenaki culture.

Intervale is located within traditional Abenaki lands being 7 miles north of Conway, New Hampshire, and close to Fryeburg, Maine, a historic Pigwacket village site that is a 13.5 mi drive SE. All three locations are on the Saco River (GoogleMaps). While early historians had placed the Sokokis on the Saco, mistaking Saco for Sokoki, contemporary writers, such as Father Gabriel Druillettes in 1650/51 did not, saying "Kenetigouc [Connecticut] est la rivière des Sokokois" ^{241} to which Gordon M. Day agreed. Whether Laurent himself had heritage as a Sokoki or another Abenaki tribe at St. Francis, is not stated—either could be true.

=== Cultural importance: Stephen Laurent's work ===
Although the camp began as a tourist attraction catering to Native American nostalgia among the New Englanders, it grew into an important center for Abenaki language and cultural preservation. It was here, in 1965, that Stephen Laurent translated Father Sébastien Rasle's A Dictionary of the Abnaki Language in North America, written c1691-1725, from French and Abenaki into English. Soon afterwards he was given Father Joseph Aubrey's French Abenaki Dictionary, an ancient, fragile book whose first draft was created about 1710 with additional notes added until c1715. This was a much larger challenge; whereas Rasle's work had been typeset, Aubrey's was hand written with faded, faint script. Laurent spent three hours a day for 30 years translating it to English. With this, Laurent captured two of the earliest descriptions of the Abenaki language.

In an interview, 1991, Laurent related hearing the spoken language described by Rowland E. Robinson as, "so soft and fluttery it would not disturb the birds or jar with the rippling streams" ^{290} and his interviewer described the language "as singing without a tune." At the time of this interview in 1991, Laurent was described as being one of only five people who could speak the language fluently. Seeing the value of preserving oral Abenaki, Laurent recorded his father's book plus other works so the pronunciations would not be lost.

"Most amazing, perhaps," he said in a 1958 essay, "in view of all the complexity is the fact that without written academics or institutes to establish rules and prevent deterioration or alterations, the Indians managed to speak their language with grammatical correctness. In my many years of association with Abenakis of today, I have yet to hear one err in using the proper inflection."

Thus Intervale became a destination for scholars; here was a valuable source of information. His collection of rare books was an attraction, and if a volume were extremely rare, he would make and share copies for his visitors. His work drew academics to Intervale for discourse and collaboration.

To learn more about Stephen's father's life and his 1884 Abenaki language dictionary, visit Joseph Laurent's Wikipedia page.

To learn about another late 19th-20th century Abenaki language teacher and scholar at Odanak, see Henry Lorne Masta‘s Wikipedia page.

== Other sources ==
Abenaki Indian Shop & Camp, blog post by Gregory Couch, "History, Exploration, Photography," 15 Sep 2023 https://www.gregorycouch.com/blog/abenaki-indian-shop-amp-camp
