= Henry Lorne Masta =

Abenaki writer, teacher, and scholar

Henry Lorne Masta (March 11, 1853 – May 12, 1943) was a school teacher at Odanak and Abenaki language (aln8ba8dwaw8gan) and culture consultant to anthropologists Frank Speck and Alfred Irving Hallowell. He authored an Abenaki to English language primer in 1932 at the age of 79 which is still in use today, entitled Abenaki Indian Legends, Grammar and Place Names in which Hallowell wrote a preface. Henry Masta was fluent in French and English besides Abenaki and was a life long resident of St. Francis (Odanak). In addition to being an educator, he was a political leader serving his community and an elected official alternating between chief or councillor for several terms (1879-1897). Beginning about 1885 Masta maintained a seasonal basket making operation in the United States on the New Jersey shore and for a few years in the Catskills.

== Education and faith ==
Henry Lorne Masta received his early education at the St. Francis Protestant School, which was also known as the Dartmouth school, located in the Abenaki village of St. Francis. It had been founded by his uncle Peter Masta née Pierre-Paul Osunkhirhine in about 1835 after the village priest succeeded in ousting Pierre-Paul from his position as instructor at the government sponsored Abenaki school where he had held the teaching position since his graduation from Dartmouth College in New Hampshire.^{194-207} Osunkhirhine had arrived about 1829 ^{194} and in 1830 he created the first Abenaki to English language primer Wôbanaki Kimzowi Awighiganm published under the name P. P. Wzôkhilain which would have been the study book used by Henry during his early education. Henry's teacher at the school was Simon Annance, grandson of François Joseph Annance^{254}—like Osunkhirhine, both Annances were also graduates of Dartmouth College and the three had converted to the Anglican faith embraced by the school.

From Masta’s own writing (1929) when he was twelve he left the Dartmouth school in St. Francis and was sent to an Anglican school at Sabrevois PQ to be trained as a missionary, and where the lessons were all in French. Masta wrote that he struggled with both French and English. Although it seems he would have had a working knowledge of French from the community and learned at least some English at the Dartmouth school under Simon Annance, the focus at the school must have been Abenaki, if this is so. He remained at the Sabrevois missionary school for five years until 1870 until about age 17 at which point he had to make a decision whether he wanted to continue on with his studies at the Anglican Theological College (University of Lenoxville, PQ) to become a minister, or no. He decided that he did not want to serve in this capacity and chose to end his schooling and begin his teaching career. Masta revealed that his struggles with French and English greatly hampered his success but he is being modest, he must have done quite well since he was offered a teaching position at the Anglican school, an unusual attainment for someone who had just graduated.^{6} The following year he took a position at the Berthierville English Academy where he taught French. It was then about 1872 when he returned home to Odanak to teach at the St. Francis Protestant Indian School (aka the Dartmouth school) ^{6} where he took over Simon Annance's position.^{251}

In 1932, anthropologist A. Irving Hallowell presented a more robust but contradictory educational background in his forward to Masta's Abenaki Indian Legends, Grammar and Place Names, stating that Henry had attended both primary and secondary schools in St. Francis, moving on to Sabrevois College where he received instruction in Latin and Greek over a three year period. Not finding a Sabrevois College, Masta's own 1929 version of primary school at St. Francis, secondary at the Sabrevois Anglican missionary school, with no college in his narrative, seems to be correct but it is at this point unknown what correspondence transpired between the two during those three years between 1929-1932 while he was writing and publishing his Abenaki language primer.

Masta spent time in the US raising money from various Protestant societies in support of his school.^{201+} Traveling, preaching and fundraising during the next decades took him away for long periods of time and were a cause of criticism, sometimes landing him in trouble at the school or over his tribal enrollment eligibility, but the story he shared with US Protestant groups of being persecuted by the Catholics brought in financial donations.

== Masta/Laurent rivalry ==
=== Teaching and writing ===
Joseph Laurent and Henry Masta are well known today for being fierce rivals, both as educators in the two competing schools and in village politics; they seem to have been born at odds, Laurent and Henry's uncle Peter Masta/Pierre-Paul Osunkhirhine having had an antagonistic relationship before Henry came into the picture.^{Ch XIV-XV}

Joseph Basilide Hidalla Laurent (Joseph Laurent) was the teacher at the village's Catholic school when Henry took over the Dartmouth school, having been in this position for 10-15 years. Laurent was educated at Odanak's French school, his teachers had been Basilide Desfossés (his godfather) and secondly, William Edge.^{247} Desfossés did not know English for which he was criticized in the community; Edge, an English/Canadian man, did. With the help of the priest, Desfossés wrote a catechism in the Abenaki language in 1832, just two years after Pierre-Paul Osunkhirhine had published his Abenaki primer and a catechism, collaborating with the same priest—Osunkhirhine's catechism was rejected while his primer is still in use.^{194} Desfossés was an active opponent of Osunkhirhine, his school and his Protestant church.^{200-207} Joseph Laurent picked up the torch of his godfather and teacher, and of the catholic priests by opposing the two Masta school teachers.

Each of these three Odanak educators created a language primer that contributed to Abenaki language study and which are still in use to this day:

- P. P. Wzôkhilain (Pierre-Paul Osunkhirshine/Peter Masta). Abenaki to English vocabulary, stories in Abenaki: Wôbanaki Kimzowi Awighiganm, 1830.
- Joseph Laurent. Abenaki to English: New Familiar Abenakis and English Dialogues, 1884.
- Henry Lorne Masta. Abenaki to English, explains the etymology relating to selected place names, defines the grammar, and includes some traditional stories: Abenaki Indian Legends, Grammar and Place Names, 1932.

Two other books are attributed to Henry Lorne Masta: the first P8batammi linto8ganal ta lall8mw8ganal wji wawassi kwsih8mgi Kchi Niwaskw, is a Protestant hymnal likely created for fellow Anglicans at St. Francis. Being obscure, it has not yet been studied to understand if it is a direct translation or if it is original material set to familiar musical scores. The hymnal was published in 1883, a year previous to Laurent's primer. His second work is an uncompleted French-Abenaki dictionary, dates unknown.

=== Politics ===
In 1879 the two teachers Joseph Laurent and Henry Masta were elected into the tribal council. Masta considered himself superior to the more conservative Laurent. Their tenure mostly consisted of introducing projects, undoing the work of the other, and filing protests.^{251} It seems everyone at St. Francis chose a side. Elections were held every three years and either Masta or Laurent or both served on the council or as chief after each election—and the rivalry never lessened. In 1897 Masta came in fourth behind Joseph Portneuf, Peter Emmett (an Adventist preacher), and Joseph Laurent; and so he was no longer in office since the tribal rules were that the top three voter preferences would serve. It was a close, very heated contest in which election protests dragged on for months.^{274} This seems to have been Henry Masta's last run for office.

== Family life ==
On June 24, 1875, Henry Lorne Masta married Caroline Tahamont, daughter of Joachim Tahamont and Marie-Anne Portneuf.^{251} The couple were the parents of eight children, only two of whom survived to adulthood; Marie Adelaide Masta (b.1883) their sixth child, who married George Denis and had a son George Abraham Denis; and Alice Freda Masta (b.1892) their eighth, who married Oliver Wawanolet dit Nolet. Of their other children, Henry and Caroline had twin daughters born in New York City in October of 1875, no record was found afterwards for the girls. Three sons followed, Edward Hanan Masta (b.1877), Charles Henry Masta (b.1879), and Levi Porter Masta (b.1881); Edward died in 1878, Charles and Levi in 1882. Their seventh child, Carrie Everline, was born 26 Nov 1888 and baptized 10 Mar 1889 at St-Francois-de-Sales Parish, Odanak. No other record has been found for Carrie.

=== Basket Makers: seasonal residence in the United States ===
From the late 19th century until about 1920 was a period of affluence for Abenaki basket makers. Winters at Odanak were for making the merchandise and in the spring whole families would migrate to tourist resorts in the US, returning home again in the autumn. Often young women from the community came with the more prosperous Abenaki families to help at the shops, make baskets, and demonstrate the craft and skill needed to create their hand-crafted wares. Families who were more successful hired local help for housework and for business and sales positions so they could focus on creating goods.^{5} Henry Masta’s family enjoyed a profitable living making baskets, enough so they were able to purchase their splints ready-made and sweetgrass in braids rather than harvesting it themselves.^{272} They hired basket makers from Odanak, household servants and help to run the business, including salesmen. The Mastas bought and sold a few small lots of land in Belmar and Asbury Park. They resided on 9th and on Mattison Avenues in Belmar and on Sewell Avenue near the Casino in Asbury Park. Throughout, they kept their main residence in St. Francis.

As an example of profitability of the basket making trade during this time, Gaby Pelletier recorded that, "Gordon Day stated that about 1900 Oliver Wawanolet [future son-in-law] made about $4,400 in one season, a sizeable income at that period."^{6}

Canadian censuses show Henry L. and Caroline Masta living in the years between 1881-1911 at Pierreville, Québec and Odanak. The Mastas began seasonal residencies as early as 1885 in Belmar, New Jersey, then Asbury Park, two adjacent oceanside communities. There were two basket makers listed in the Belmar City Directory of 1885: Henry L. Masta on 9th Avenue and another Abenaki man, Alexander Benedict on 16th Avenue. Trouble came to the Mastas in the summer of 1897 when three of their hired salesmen were tried and convicted of stealing a great quantity of baskets. The thieves were sentenced on the 21st of April 1898 to five months in the county jail; a lighter sentence which might have been due in part to, “Mr. Masta …desired that the defendants be not punished too severely, and he also stated that a restitution was about to be made for the baskets taken.”

In 1900 there was a sojourn for the family to Shandaken (Pine Hill) in the Catskill mountains of New York. The US Census for 1900 recorded a group of Abenakis living in the household of Henry Masta, age 47, Basket Manufacturing: Caroline his wife, age 45; Enos (Ignace) Henry’s father, age 79 widowed; and basket makers Axina Lagrave [nee Exina Emmett], age 30 married [to Frederick Tahamont]; Mary J. Gevilmeir?, age 19; Odile Sioui, age 22; Philias Launiere, age 23; Emerentienne Launiere, age 24 married; Amanda Descoteaux, age 17; and Mary Emmett [sister of Exina Emmett Lagrave], age 24. Philias Launiere is likely the same Phileas Launière of Odanak, sole supplier of splints and other basket materials in the 1920s-1940s, who almost single-handedly controlled the industry and was loathed by many for his dominance.^{7} In 1905 Henry was alone in Shandaken after his father Ignace passed.

=== Caroline Masta, Basket Maker in Asbury Park ===
By 1901 Caroline Masta was living in Asbury Park, New Jersey, continuing to make baskets with their two daughters, Marie Adelaide and Alice Freda. In June of that year, she and Victoria Laeunear (sp?) gave a demonstration:

"The two Indian women who wove basket work last year at the Asbury avenue pavilion are there again and attract interested spectators as they do their work. The names of the women are Caroline Masta and Victoria Laeunear, her assistant, and they come from Pierreville, Quebec, Canada."

During this time, Caroline Masta became well known as a basket maker. Following is an excerpt from Otis T. Mason's 1904 book, Indian Basketry…^{272}

"Plate 120 shows Caroline Masta, an Abenaki Indian woman from Pierreville, Canada, seated in her humble laboratory at Belmar, New Jersey. Her materials are of black ash (Fraxinus nigra) and sweet grass (Savastana odorata). The former has been worked out by machinery in Canada, and is piled up around her; the latter is gathered and braided by her relatives, and sent to her all ready for the last step in manufacture. This Indian woman conducts a thriving business, not being able to make up ware as fast as there is demand for it. [page 272]

In 1910 Caroline Masta was enumerated with her two daughters and niece Dora Masta in Asbury Park, Ocean County, New Jersey, Basket Manufacturers, along with Caroline's nephew (Dora's husband) Frederick Tahamot [Tahamont], servant.

Also during this time Caroline was frequently noted as a speaker at Salvation Army meetings and as a singer. A few musical performances at these meetings were publicized: a holiday concert with Miss Mary Obomsawin along with singing in the "Indian Language" at a later meeting. In 1916 Caroline suffered a paralyzing stroke. She died in 1925 at her home in Ottawa, Canada. The burial was at Odanak.

=== Henry's later years at Odanak ===
On 19 February 1906 Henry Masta made an announcement to a full assembly of the tribe, promising to abstain from alcohol for six years and asked the others to do the same. He bested that vow by approximately 37 years. In 1909 he resumed his position at the village’s Protestant school where he taught until 1930.^{291} In 1929 Masta began work on his primer, Abenaki Indian Legends, Grammar and Place Names. He was seventy-nine years of age when it was published.

During his last years, Henry Masta lived with his daughter Alice Nolet in Ottawa. He died there in 1943.^{291}

=== Descendants ===
There are no known descendants of Henry Lorne Masta and Caroline Tahamont beyond the generation of their two surviving daughters:

Marie Adelaide Masta (1883-1961) their sixth child, was married to George A. Denis about August 1899. Their son George Abraham Denis was born in early July 1900 in Belmar, New Jersey when she was 17; he died there on August 18 aged 5 weeks. There are no other children found in records.

Adelaide continued making baskets at least off and on. In the 1900 US Census in Neptune, Monmouth County, New Jersey, Adelaide and George were living with Mary and Fred Reimuller; both the men were basket makers. The couple were recorded on the Indian Schedule of June 1990 which states they had been married for 10 months. Mary Reimuller was Marie Emmett, mentioned earlier, sister of Exina Emmett and daughters of Lazare Emmett. In 1901 George and Adelaide were recorded in St. Francis where George was employed doing industrial work. In 1910 Adelaide was recorded in Asbury Park with her mother and sister Alice, and cousins Dora Masta making baskets and Fred Tahamont, as mentioned above. The 1911 the Canadian census shows Adelaide and George in the household of H. L. Masta and Caroline, where Caroline and George were making baskets, Henry's occupation cannot be made out, and neither Adelaide or Alice had occupations recorded. In 1931 Adelaide was living in Port Carling, Ontario with a boarder Genevieve Raisoville (sp?) making baskets. In 1940 George and Adelaide were living in Dade County, Florida, where George was a laborer in a grove and Adelaide was making Indian handicrafts; in 1946 she and George were recorded in the Albany City Directory. In 1950 the couple were living in Albany where George was a laborer in water works and Mary (Mary Adelaide) had no occupation listed. Mary Adelaide (Masta) Denis died the 11th of January, 1961 in Sorel, Quebec.

Alice Freda Masta (1893-1983) their eighth and last child, married Oliver Wawanolet dit Nolet 4 Jun 1942 in Ottawa. No children have been found in Canadian or US records. Alice and Oliver had moved back to Canada where she held an accounting position within the Canadian government’s department of Indian affairs.

== Commentary: Abenaki Indian Legends, Grammar and Place Names ==
From Alfred Irving Hallowell, 1932:

The book thus embodies the virtues of a keen and active linguistic heritage. It can hardly be judged by the rigid canons of academic criticism, since the author does not pretend that he has presented a complete philological treatise, in the narrow sense. In my opinion, the intrinsic interest of the book lies in the virtues of its defects. The mind of the author is deeply immersed in the idiom which he sets forth, a relation impossible to the outsider; no matter how well trained in comparative linguistics.^{9} ^{13}

In the 2014 edition of The Oxford Handbook of Indigenous American Literature, author James Howard Cox credits Pierre-Paul Osunkhirhine, Joseph Laurent, and Henry Lorne Masta for revitalizing the Abenaki language:

Finally, a number of Native writers in the Northeast published or composed books, journals, and documents in their Indigenous languages, enabling, perhaps without knowing it, the revitalization movements of the late twentieth and twenty-first centuries. Odanak Abenaki writers, including Peter Paul Wzôkhilain, Joseph Laurent, and Henry Lorne Masta, published awikhiganak, Western Abenaki language books, designed for teaching their students English. These works are being used today by language teachers, creative writers, and community members on both sides of the border to continue an endangered language that has survived centuries of colonization.

== Additional references ==
=== Peter Paul Osunkhirhine ===
"Dartmouth Indians" by The Editor, Dartmouth Alumni Magazine, Mar 1936. https://archive.dartmouthalumnimagazine.com/article/1936/3/1/dartmouth-indians

"Wo̲banaki kimzowi awighigan or 'Wabanaki learning book'" by Alexandra Moleski, The Beehive, Massachusetts Historical Society. Updated 20 Nov 2024. https://www.masshist.org/beehiveblog/2024/11/wo̲banaki-kimzowi-awighigan-or-wabanaki-learning-book/
