= Abenaki =

Indigenous people of the Northeastern Woodlands

Wôbanaki
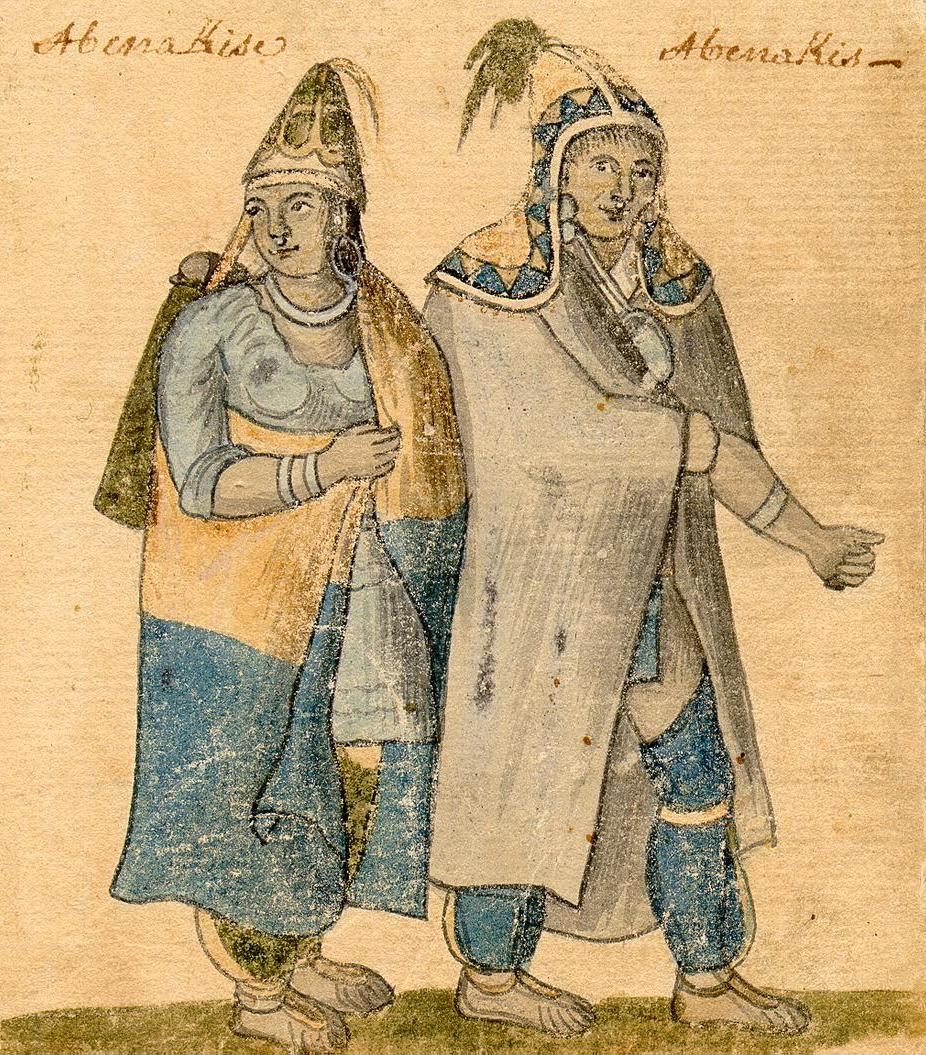

Total population
- ~21,000

Regions with significant populations
- Canada: 18,420 (2021)
- Quebec: 16,400
- United States (Vermont, New Hampshire, Maine), self-identified: 2,544 (2000)

Languages
- Abenaki, French, English

Religion
- Abenaki mythology, Christianity

Related ethnic groups
- Other Algonquian peoples Especially Wolastoqiyik, Mi'kmaq, Passamaquoddy, and Penobscot

- People: Alnôbak (Wôbanakiak)
- Language: Abenaki (Alnôbadôwawôgan), Plains Indian Sign Language (Môgiadawawôgan)
- Country: Dawnland (Ndakinna); Wabanaki

The Abenaki (Abenaki: Wôbanaki) are an Indigenous people of the Northeastern Woodlands of Canada and the United States. They are an Algonquian-speaking people and part of the Wabanaki Confederacy. The Eastern Abenaki language was predominantly spoken in Maine, while the Western Abenaki language was spoken in Quebec, Vermont, and New Hampshire.

While Abenaki peoples share cultural traits, they historically did not have a centralized government. They came together as a post-contact community after their original tribes were decimated by colonization, disease, and warfare.

== Names ==
The word Abenaki and its syncope, Abnaki, are both derived from Wabanaki, or Wôbanakiak, meaning "People of the Dawn Land" in the Abenaki language. While the two terms are often confused, the Abenaki are one of several tribes in the Wabanaki Confederacy.

Alternate spellings include: Abnaki, Abinaki, Alnôbak, Abanakee, Abanaki, Abanaqui, Abanaquois, Abenaka, Abenake, Abenaki, Abenakias, Abenakiss, Abenakkis, Abenaque, Abenaqui, Abenaquioict, Abenaquiois, Abenaquioue, Abenati, Abeneaguis', Abenequa, Abenkai, Abenquois, Abernaqui, Abnaqui, Abnaquies, Abnaquois, Abnaquotii, Abasque, Abnekais, Abneki, Abonakies, and Abonnekee.

Wôbanakiak is derived from wôban ("dawn" or "east") and aki ("land") (compare Proto-Algonquian *wa·pan and *axkyi) — the Indigenous name of the area broadly corresponding to New England and the Maritimes. It is sometimes used to refer to all the Algonquian-speaking peoples of the area—Western Abenaki, Eastern Abenaki, Wolastoqiyik-Passamaquoddy, and Mi'kmaq—as a single group.

The Abenaki people also call themselves Alnôbak, meaning "Real People", and by the autonym Alnanbal, meaning "men".

Historically, ethnologists have classified the Abenaki by geographic groups: Western Abenaki and Eastern Abenaki. Within these groups are the Abenaki bands:

== Western Abenaki ==
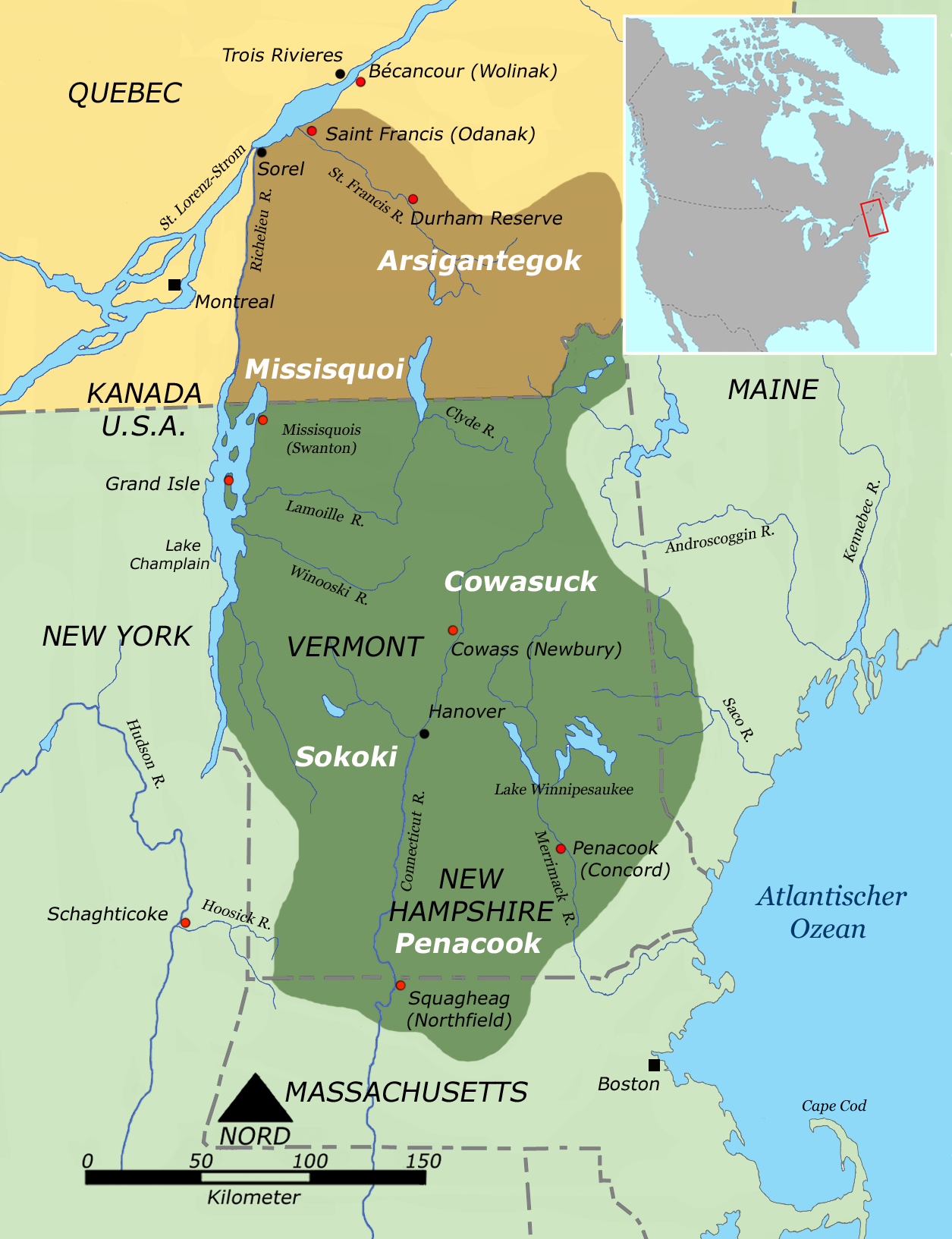
Historical territories of Western Abenaki tribes, c. 17th century

- Arsigantegok, (Arrasaguntacook, Ersegontegog, Assagunticook, Anasaguntacook), lived along the St. Francis River in Quebec. Principal village: St. Francis (Odanak). The people were referred to as "St. Francis River Abenakis", and this term gradually was applied to all Western Abenaki.
- Cowasuck (also Cohass, Cohasiac, Koasek, Koasek, Coos – "People of the Pines"), lived in the upper Connecticut River valley. Principal village: Cowass, near Newbury, Vermont.
- Missiquoi (also Masipskwoik, Mazipskikskoik, Missique, Misiskuoi, Missisco, Missiassik – "People of the Flint"), also known as the Sokoki. They lived in the Missisquoi River valley, from Lake Champlain to the headwaters. Principal village around Swanton, Vermont.
- Pennacook (also Penacook, Penikoke, Openango), lived in the Merrimack Valley, therefore sometimes called Merrimack. Principal village Penacook, New Hampshire. The Pennacook were once a large confederacy who were politically distinct and competitive with their northern Abenaki neighbors.
- Sokoki (also Sokwaki, Squakheag, Socoquis, Sokoquius, Zooquagese, Soquachjck, Onejagese – "People Who Separated"), lived in the middle and upper Connecticut River valley. Principal villages: Squakheag, Northfield, Massachusetts, and Fort Hill.

Smaller tribes:

- Amoskeay
- Cocheco
- Nashua
- Ossipee, lived along the shores of Ossipee Lake in east-central New Hampshire. Often classed as Eastern Abenaki.
- Pemigewasset
- Piscataqua
- Souhegan
- Winnipesaukee (also Winnibisauga, Wioninebeseck, Winninebesakik – "region of the land around lakes"), lived along the shores of Lake Winnipesaukee, New Hampshire.

=== Wabanaki Nation ===
- Odanak (also known as Pierreville, in the regional county municipality of Nicolet-Yamaska), lived southwest of Trois-Rivières, Centre-du-Québec, and included settlements along the Saint-François River and Magog River.
- Wôlinak (also Becancour, in the regional county municipality of Becancour), lived around Trois-Rivières, Centre-du-Québec, and included settlements along the Bécancour River.

According to the 2021 census of Statistics Canada, 16,400 people in Quebec declared Abenaki ancestry. In 2025, the Odanak and Wôlinak communities had 3,209 and 746 registered people, respectively, for a total of 3,955. Of these, only 400 resided in their affiliated communities. That is, for every person of Abenaki ancestry living on a reserve, 40 live outside it.

== Eastern Abenaki ==
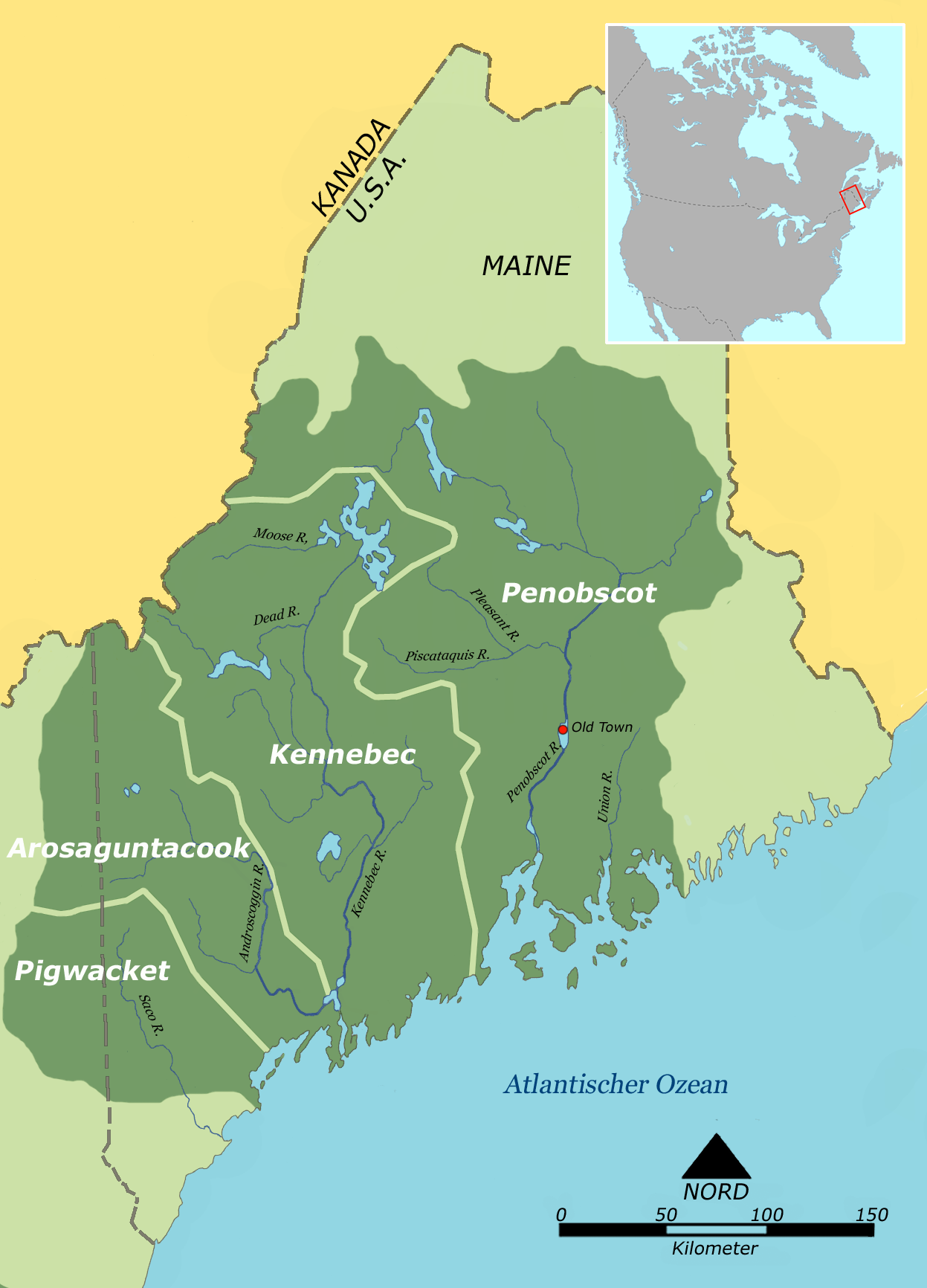
Eastern Abenaki

- Androscoggin (also Alessikantekw, Arosaguntacock, Amariscoggin), lived in the Androscoggin River valley and along the St. Francis River, therefore often called "St. Francis River Abenaki".
- Kennebec (also Kinipekw, Kennebeck, Caniba, later known as Norridgewock), lived in the Kennebec River valley in central Maine. Principal village: Norridgewock (Naridgewalk, Neridgewok, Noronjawoke); other villages: Amaseconti (Amesokanti, Anmissoukanti), Kennebec, and Sagadahoc.
- Penobscot (also Panawahpskek, Pamnaouamske, Pentagouet), lived in the Penobscot Valley. Principal villages: Penobscot (Pentagouet), now Indian Island, Old Town, Maine; other villages: Agguncia, Asnela, Catawamtek, Kenduskeag, Mattawamkeag, Meecombe, Negas, Olamon, Passadumkeag, Precaute, Segocket, and Wabigganus. Now a separate federally recognized tribe.
- Pequawket (also Pigwacket, Pequaki), lived along the Saco River and in the White Mountains. Principal village Pigwacket was located on the upper Saco River near present-day Fryeburg, Maine. Occupied an intermediate location, therefore sometimes classed as Western Abenaki.

Smaller tribes:

- Apikwahki
- Amaseconti, potentially related to the Androsgoggins, they lived between the upper Kennebec and Androscoggin rivers in western Maine, their central village was somewhere near modern-day Farmington.
- Kwupahag (also Kwapahag)
- Ossipee, lived along the shores of Ossipee Lake in east-central New Hampshire. Sometimes classed as Western Abenaki.
- Rocameca, they were one of the major bands of the Androscoggins, lived along the upper Androscoggin River, centred around Canton, Maine.
- Wawinak (also Ouanwinak, Sheepscot, Wawenock, Wawnock, Wewenoc), lived in the coastal areas of southern Maine.

Wolastoqiyik and Passamaquoddy:

- Wolastoqiyik (also Walastekwyk, Maliseet, Malecite), lived in the inland of upper Maine and middle New Brunswick along the St. John River. Principal villages: Meductic, Aukpaque. Now a separate federally recognized tribe.
- Passamaquoddy (also Peskotomuhktati, Pestomuhkati), lived on the Passamaquoddy Bay coast and inland, between the St. John, St. Croix and Penobscot rivers, in present-day Maine and New Brunswick. Principal village: Machias. Now a separate federally recognized tribe.

== Location ==
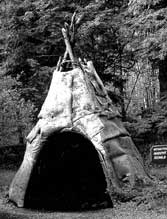
Abenaki wigwam with birch bark covering.

The homeland of the Abenaki, called Ndakinna (Our Land; alternately written as N'dakinna or N'Dakinna), previously extended across most of what is now northern New England, southern Quebec, and the southern Canadian Maritimes. The Eastern Abenaki population was concentrated in portions of New Brunswick and Maine east of New Hampshire's White Mountains. The other major group, the Western Abenaki, lived in the Connecticut River valley in Vermont, New Hampshire, and Massachusetts. The Missiquoi lived along the eastern shore of Lake Champlain. The Pennacook lived along the Merrimack River in southern New Hampshire. The maritime Abenaki lived around the St. Croix and Wolastoq (Saint John River) valleys near the boundary line between Maine and New Brunswick.

English colonial settlement in New England and frequent violence forced many Abenaki to migrate to Quebec. The Abenaki settled in the Sillery region of Quebec between 1676 and 1680, and subsequently, for about twenty years, lived on the banks of the Chaudière River near the falls, before settling in Odanak and Wôlinak in the early 18th century.

In those days, the Abenaki practiced a subsistence economy based on hunting, fishing, trapping, berry picking and on growing corn, beans, squash, potatoes and tobacco. They also produced baskets, made of ash and sweet grass, for picking wild berries, and boiled maple sap to make syrup. Basket weaving remains a traditional activity practiced by some tribal members.

During the Anglo-French wars, the Abenaki were allies of France, having been displaced from Ndakinna by immigrating English settlers. An anecdote from the period tells the story of a Wolastoqew war chief named Nescambuit (variant spellings include Assacumbuit), who killed more than 140 enemies of King Louis XIV of France and received the rank of knight. Not all Abenaki people fought on the side of the French, however; many remained on their Native lands in the northern colonies. Much of the trapping was done by the people and traded to the English colonists for durable goods. These contributions by Native American Abenaki peoples went largely unreported.

Two tribal communities formed in Canada, one once known as Saint-François-du-Lac near Pierreville (now called Odanak, Abenaki for "coming home"), and the other near Bécancour (now known as Wôlinak) on the south shore of the St. Lawrence River, directly across the river from Trois-Rivières. These two Abenaki reserves continue to grow and develop. Since the year 2000, the total Abenaki population (on and off reserve) has doubled to 2,101 members in 2011. Approximately 400 Abenaki reside on these two reserves, which cover a total area of less than 7 km^{2} (2.7 sq mi). The unrecognized majority are off-reserve members, living in various cities and towns across Canada and the United States.

There are about 3,200 Abenaki living in Vermont and New Hampshire, without reservations, chiefly around Lake Champlain. The remaining Abenaki people live in multi-racial towns and cities across Canada and the US, mainly in Ontario, Quebec, New Brunswick, and northern New England.

== Language ==
The Abenaki language is closely related to the Panawahpskek (Penobscot) language. Other neighboring Wabanaki tribes, the Pestomuhkati (Passamaquoddy), Wolastoqiyik (Maliseet), and Mi'kmaq, and other Eastern Algonquian languages share many linguistic similarities. It has come close to extinction as a spoken language. Tribal members are working to revive the Abenaki language at Odanak (means "in the village"), a First Nations Abenaki reserve near Pierreville, Quebec, and throughout New Hampshire, Vermont, and New York state.

The language is polysynthetic, meaning that a phrase or an entire sentence is expressed by a single word. For example, the word for "white man" awanoch is a combination of the words awani meaning "who" and uji meaning "from". Thus, the word for "white man" literally translates to "Who is this man and where does he come from?"

== History ==
There is archaeological evidence of Indigenous people in what is today New Hampshire for at least 12,000 years.

In Reflections in Bullough's Pond, historian Diana Muir argues that the Abenakis' neighbors, pre-contact Iroquois, were an imperialist, expansionist culture whose cultivation of the corn/beans/squash agricultural complex enabled them to support a large population. They made war primarily against neighboring Algonquian peoples, including the Abenaki. Muir uses archaeological data to argue that the Iroquois expansion onto Algonquian lands was checked by the Algonquian adoption of agriculture. This enabled them to support their own populations large enough to have sufficient warriors to defend against the threat of Iroquois conquest.

In 1524 Portuguese explorer Estêvão Gomes kidnapped 58 Abenaki and brought them back to Europe to be sold into slavery.

In 1602 Bartholomew Gosnold made first English contact with the Abenaki at Cape Elizabeth, Maine. Two years later in 1604, Samuel de Champlain made contact with the Abenaki along Maine's coast and the Kennebec River where he wrote of their extensive planting grounds.

In 1605 English captain, George Weymouth, sailed to Maine on behalf of Ferdinando Gorges with the mission of kidnapping Abenakis to learn more of the landscape and population of their communities. He kidnapped five Wawenock Abenaki men from Allen Island and along the St. George River, (Manida, Skidwarres/Skettawarroes, Tahanedo/Nahanada/Dehanada, Assacumet,/Sassacomoit, and Amoret). Weymouth brought the men back to England. This journey was documented by James Rosier. The five Abenaki were then divided with three of them held captive by Gorges (Assacumet, Skidwarres, Manida) and the two others by Sir John Popham (Amoret, Tahanedo). Two of the captives would ultimately be returned home.

In 1614, Thomas Hunt captured 24 Abenaki people, including Squanto (Tisquantum) and took them to Spain, where they were sold into slavery. During the European colonization of North America, the land occupied by the Abenaki was in the area between the new colonies of England in Massachusetts and the French in Quebec. Since no party agreed to territorial boundaries, there was regular conflict among them. The Abenaki were traditionally allied with the French; during the reign of Louis XIV, Chief Assacumbuit was designated a member of the French nobility for his service.

Around 1669, the Abenaki started to emigrate to Quebec due to conflicts with English colonists and epidemics of new infectious diseases. The governor of New France allocated two seigneuries (large self-administered areas similar to feudal fiefs). The first, of what was later to become Indian reserves, was on the Saint Francis River and is now known as the Odanak Indian Reserve; the second was founded near Bécancour and is called the Wôlinak Indian Reserve.

=== Abenaki wars ===
When the Wampanoag under King Philip (Metacomet) fought the English colonists in New England in 1675 in King Philip's War, the Abenaki joined the Wampanoag. For three years they fought along the Maine frontier in the First Abenaki War. The Abenaki pushed back the line of white settlement through devastating raids on scattered farmhouses and small villages. The war was settled by a peace treaty in 1678, with the Wampanoag more than decimated and many Native survivors having been sold into slavery in Bermuda.

During Queen Anne's War in 1702, the Abenaki were allied with the French; they raided numerous English colonial settlements in Maine, from Wells to Casco, killing about 300 settlers over ten years. They also occasionally raided into Massachusetts, for instance in Groton and Deerfield in 1704. The raids stopped when the war ended. Some captives were adopted into the Mohawk and Abenaki tribes; older captives were generally ransomed, and the colonies carried on a brisk trade.

The Third Abenaki War (1722–25), called the Dummer's War or Father Rale's War, erupted when the French Jesuit missionary Sébastien Rale (or Rasles, ~1657?-1724) encouraged the Abenaki to halt the spread of Yankee settlements. When the Massachusetts militia tried to seize Rale, the Abenaki raided the settlements at Brunswick, Arrowsick, and Merry-Meeting Bay. The Massachusetts government then declared war and bloody battles were fought at Norridgewock (1724), where Rale was killed, and at a daylong battle at the Indian village near present-day Fryeburg, Maine, on the upper Saco River (1725). Peace conferences at Boston and Casco Bay brought an end to the war. After Rale died, the Abenaki moved to a settlement on the St. Francis River.

The Abenaki from St. Francois continued to raid British settlements in their former homelands along the New England frontier during Father Le Loutre's War (see Northeast Coast campaign (1750)) and the French and Indian War.

=== Canada ===
The development of tourism projects has allowed the Canadian Abenaki to develop a modern economy, while preserving their culture and traditions. For example, since 1960, the Odanak Historical Society has managed the first and one of the largest Indigenous museums in Quebec, a few miles from the Quebec-Montreal axis. Over 5,000 people visit the Abenaki Museum annually. Several Abenaki companies include: in Wôlinak, General Fiberglass Engineering employs a dozen Natives, with annual sales exceeding C$3 million. Odanak is now active in transportation and distribution. Notable Abenaki from this area include the documentary filmmaker Alanis Obomsawin (National Film Board of Canada).

=== United States ===
==== Maine: federally recognized tribes ====
The Penobscot, the Passamaquoddy, and Houlton Band of Maliseet Indians are federally recognized as Native American tribes in the United States.

==== Vermont: state-recognized tribes ====
Nulhegan Band of the Coosuk Abenaki Nation, Koasek Abenaki Tribe, Elnu Abenaki Tribe, and the Missisquoi Abenaki Tribe are, as of 2011, have all been state-recognized by Vermont.

The Missisquoi Abenaki applied for federal recognition as an Indian tribe in the 1980s but failed to meet four of the seven criteria. The Bureau of Indian Affairs found that less than 1 percent of the Missisquoi's 1,171 members could show descent from an Abenaki ancestor. The bureau's report concluded that the petitioner is "a collection of individuals of claimed but mostly undemonstrated Indian ancestry with little or no social or historical connection with each other before the early 1970s."

State recognition allows applicants to seek certain scholarship funds reserved for American Indians and to for members to market artwork as American Indian or Native American–made under the Indian Arts and Crafts Act of 1990.

In 2002, the State of Vermont reported that the Abenaki people have not had a "continuous presence" in the state and had migrated north to Quebec by the end of the 17th century. Facing annihilation, many Abenaki had begun emigrating to Canada, then under French control, around 1669.

===== "Race-shifting" controversy =====
The Abenaki Nation, based in Quebec, claim that those self-identifying as Abenaki in Vermont are settlers making false claims to Indigenous ancestry. While the Odanak and Wolinak Abenaki First Nations in Quebec initially believed claims from residents of Vermont who said they were Abenaki, the Odanak reversed their position in 2003, calling on the groups in Vermont to provide them with genealogical evidence of Indigenous ancestry.

Scholars have not been able to find credible evidence of the Vermont Abenaki's claims of Indigenous ancestry. Anthropological research from the first half of the 20th century indicates that no Abenaki community actively existed in Vermont during that time period.

Researcher Darryl Leroux characterizes the Vermont Abenaki's claims of Abenaki ancestry as "race-shifting", arguing that genealogical and archival evidence shows that most members of the state-recognized tribes are descended from white French Canadians. Leroux found that only 2.2 percent of the Missisquoi Abenaki membership has Abenaki ancestry, with the rest of the organization's root ancestors being primarily French Canadian and migrating to Vermont in the mid-19th century. The Abenaki Nation of Missisquoi's shifting claims about its root ancestors as well as loose membership criteria are consistent with race-shifting patterns. Leroux's research prompted renewed calls by the Abenaki First Nations to reassess Vermont's state recognition process.

In 2025, leaders of the Quebec-based Odanak and Wôlinak communities released a genealogical report they had commissioned into the origins of prominent Vermont-recognized Abenaki leaders. All subjects of the report were found to have at least 96.9 percent European ancestry, although "one or two distant Indigenous ancestors". Odanak representative Jacques Watso accused the Vermont groups of falsifying their ancestry and allowing "illegitimate groups to obtain official recognition and rights that rightfully belong to the true Abenaki people". In response, the Vermont leaders issued a joint statement describing the report as "malicious propaganda" and "junk science, compiled with bias and full of factual and interpretative errors".

==== New Hampshire and minority recognition ====
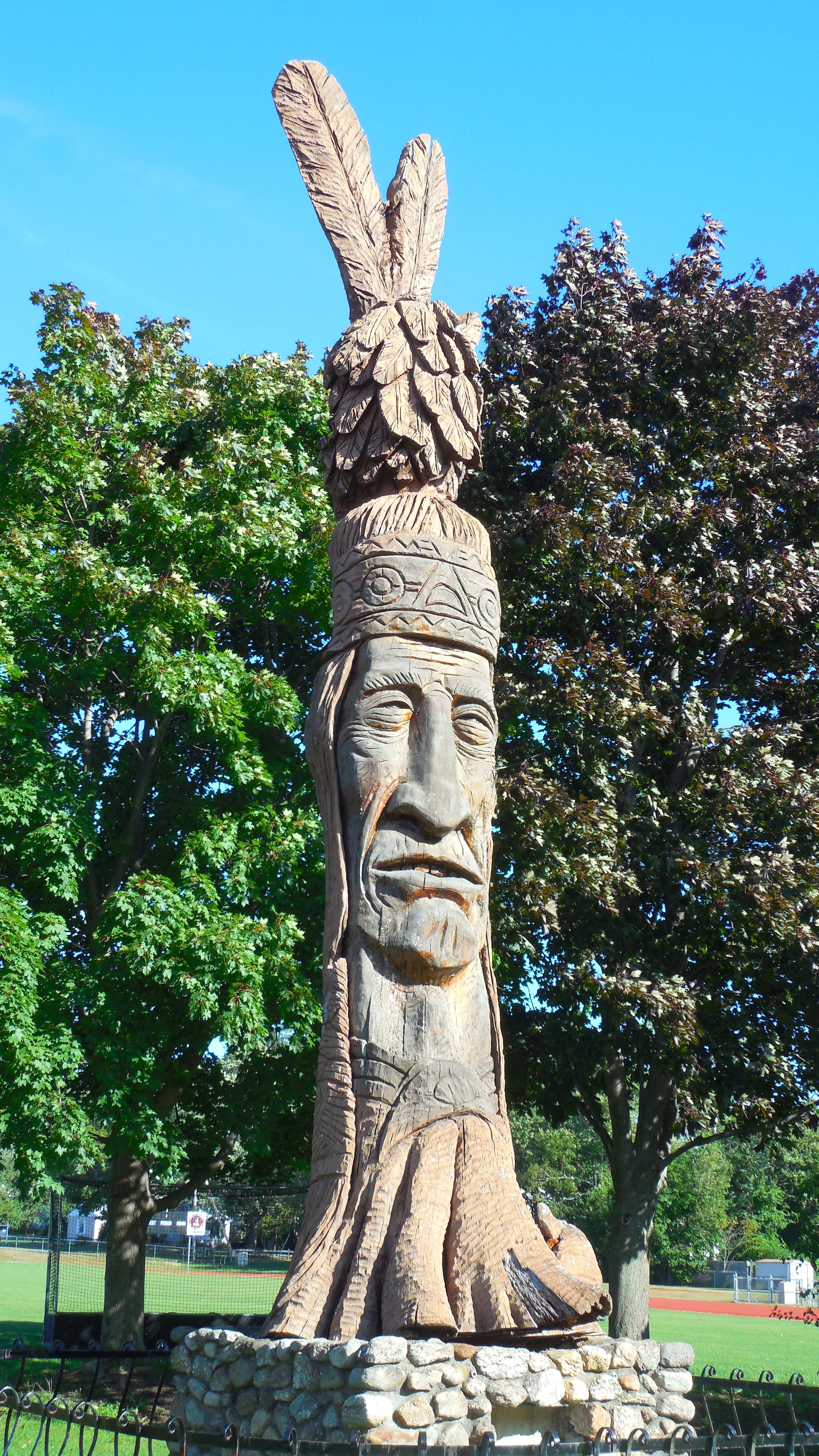
A 36 ft (11 m) statue of Keewakwa Abenaki Keenahbeh in Opechee Park in Laconia, New Hampshire

New Hampshire does not recognize any Abenaki tribes. It has no federally recognized tribes or state-recognized tribes; however, it established the New Hampshire Commission on Native American Affairs in 2010. The various Cowasuck, Abenaki, and other Native and heritage groups are represented to the commission.

In 2021, a bill was introduced to the New Hampshire legislature to allow New Hampshire communities to rename locations in the Abenaki language. This bill did not pass.

== Culture ==
There are a dozen variations of the name "Abenaki", such as Abenaquiois, Abakivis, Quabenakionek, Wabenakies and others.

The Abenaki were described in the Jesuit Relations as not cannibals, and as docile, ingenious, temperate in the use of liquor, and not profane.

Abenaki lifeways were similar to those of Algonquian-speaking peoples of southern New England. They cultivated food crops and built villages on or near fertile river floodplains. They also hunted game, fished, and gathered wild plants and fungi.

Unlike the Haudenosaunee, the Abenaki were patrilineal. Each man had different hunting territories inherited through his father.

Most of the year, Abenaki lived in dispersed bands of extended families. Bands came together during the spring and summer at seasonal villages near rivers, or somewhere along the seacoast for planting and fishing. During the winter, the Abenaki lived in small groups further inland. These villages occasionally had to be fortified, depending on the alliances and enemies of other tribes or of Europeans near the village. Abenaki villages were quite small with an average number of 100 residents.

Most Abenaki crafted dome-shaped, bark-covered wigwams for housing, though a few preferred oval-shaped longhouses. During the winter, the Abenaki lined the inside of their conical wigwams with bear and deer skins for warmth.

=== Gender, food, division of labor, and other cultural traits ===
The Abenaki were a farming society that supplemented agriculture with hunting and gathering. Generally the men were the hunters. The women tended the fields and grew the crops. In their fields, they planted the crops in groups of "sisters". The three sisters were grown together: the stalk of corn supported the beans, and squash or pumpkins provided ground cover and reduced weeds. The men would hunt bears, deer, fish, and birds.

The Abenaki were a patrilineal society, which was common among New England tribes. In this they differed from the Haudenosaunee or six Iroquois tribes to the west in New York, and from many other North American Native tribes who had matrilineal societies.

Groups used the consensus method to make important decisions.

=== Storytelling ===
Storytelling is a major part of Abenaki culture. It is used not only as entertainment but also as a teaching method. The Abenaki view stories as having lives of their own and being aware of how they are used. Stories were used as a means of teaching children behavior. Children were not to be mistreated, and so instead of punishing the child, they would be told a story.

One of the stories is of Azban the Raccoon. This is a story about a proud raccoon that challenges a waterfall to a shouting contest. When the waterfall does not respond, Azban dives into the waterfall to try to outshout it; he is swept away because of his pride. This story would be used to show a child the pitfalls of pride.

=== Ethnobotany ===
The Abenaki smash the flowers and leaves of Ranunculus acris and sniff them for headaches. They consume the fruit of Vaccinium myrtilloides as part of their traditional diet. They also use the fruit and the grains of Viburnum nudum var. cassinoides for food.

Many other plants are used for various healing and treatment modalities, including for the skin, as a disinfectant, as a cure-all, as a respiratory aid, for colds, coughs, fevers, grippe, gas, blood strengthening, headaches and other pains, rheumatism, demulcent, nasal inflammation, anthelmintic, for the eyes, abortifacent, for the bones, antihemorrhagic, as a sedative, anaphrodisiac, swellings, urinary aid, gastrointestinal aid, as a hemostat, pediatric aid (such as for teething), and other unspecified or general uses.

They use Hierochloe odorata (sweetgrass), Apocynum (dogbane), Betula papyrifera (paper birch), Fraxinus americana (white ash), Fraxinus nigra (black ash), Laportea canadensis (Canada nettle), a variety of Salix species, and Tilia americana (basswood, or American linden) var. Americana for making baskets, canoes, snowshoes, and whistles. They use Hierochloe odorata and willow to make containers, Betula papyrifera to create containers, moose calls and other utilitarian pieces, and the bark of Cornus sericea (red osier dogwood) ssp. sericea for smoking.

They also use red maple, sweet flag, an unknown Amelanchier species, Caltha palustris, Cardamine diphylla, Cornus canadensis, an unknown Crataegus species, Fragaria virginiana, Gaultheria procumbens, Osmunda cinnamomea, Phaseolus vulgaris, Photinia melanocarpa, Prunus virginiana, Rubus idaeus and another unknown Rubus species, Solanum tuberosum, Spiraea alba var. latifolia, Vaccinium angustifolium, and Zea mays as a tea, soup, jelly, sweetener, condiment, snack, or meal.

The Abenaki use the gum of balsam fir trees for slight itches and as an antiseptic ointment. They stuff the leaves, needles and wood into pillows as a panacea.

== Population and epidemics ==
Before the Abenaki, except the Pennacook and Mi'kmaq, had contact with the European world, their population may have numbered as many as 40,000. Around 20,000 would have been Eastern Abenaki, another 10,000 would have been Western Abenaki, and the last 10,000 would have been Maritime Abenaki. Early contact with European fishermen resulted in two major epidemics that affected Abenaki during the 16th century. The first epidemic was an unknown sickness occurring sometime between 1564 and 1570, and the second one was typhus in 1586. Multiple epidemics arrived a decade prior to the English colonization of Massachusetts in 1620, when three separate sicknesses swept across New England and the Canadian Maritimes. Maine was hit very hard during the year of 1617, with a fatality rate of 75 percent, and the population of the Eastern Abenaki fell to about 5,000. The more isolated Western Abenaki suffered fewer fatalities, losing about half of their original population of 10,000.

The new diseases continued to strike in epidemics, starting with smallpox in 1631, 1633, and 1639. Seven years later, an unknown epidemic struck, with influenza passing through the following year. Smallpox affected the Abenaki again in 1649, and diphtheria came through 10 years later. Smallpox struck in 1670, and influenza in 1675. Smallpox affected the Native Americans in 1677, 1679, 1687, along with measles, 1691, 1729, 1733, 1755, and finally in 1758.

The Abenaki population continued to decline, but in 1676, they took in thousands of refugees from many southern New England tribes displaced by settlement and King Philip's War. Because of this, descendants of nearly every southern New England Algonquian tribe can be found among the Abenaki people. A century later, fewer than 1,000 Abenaki remained after the American Revolution.

In the 1990 US census, 1,549 people identified themselves as Abenaki. So did 2,544 people in the 2000 US census, with 6,012 people claiming Abenaki heritage. In 1991 Canadian Abenaki numbered 945; by 2006 they numbered 2,164.

== Fiction ==
Lydia Maria Child wrote of the Abenaki in her short story, "The Church in the Wilderness" (1828). Several Abenaki characters and much about their 18th-century culture are featured in the Kenneth Roberts' novel Arundel (1930). The film Northwest Passage (1940) is based on a novel of the same name by Roberts.

The Abenaki are featured in Charles McCarry's historical novel Bride of the Wilderness (1988), and James Archibald Houston's novel Ghost Fox (1977), both of which are set in the eighteenth century; and in Jodi Picoult's Second Glance (2003) and Lone Wolf (2012) novels, set in the contemporary world. Books for younger readers both have historical settings: Joseph Bruchac's The Arrow Over the Door (1998) (grades 4–6) is set in 1777; and Beth Kanell's young adult novel, The Darkness Under the Water (2008), concerns a young Abenaki-French Canadian girl during the time of the Vermont Eugenics Project, 1931–1936.

The first sentence in Norman Mailer's novel Harlot's Ghost makes reference to the Abenaki: "On a late-winter evening in 1983, while driving through fog along the Maine coast, recollections of old campfires began to drift into the March mist, and I thought of the Abnaki Indians of the Algonquin tribe who dwelt near Bangor a thousand years ago."

== Nonfiction ==
Letters and other nonfiction writing can be found in the anthology Dawnland Voices, edited by Siobhan Senier. Selections include letters from leader of the early praying town, Wamesit in Massachusetts Samuel Numphow, Sagamore Kancamagus, and writings on the Abenaki language by former chief of the reserve at Odanak in Quebec, Joseph Laurent, as well as many others.

Accounts of life with the Abenaki can be found in the captivity narratives written by women taken captive by the Abenaki from the early New England settlements: Mary Rowlandson (1682), Hannah Duston (1702); Elizabeth Hanson (1728); Susannah Willard Johnson (1754); and Jemima Howe (1792).

== Maps ==
Maps showing the approximate locations of areas occupied by members of the Wabanaki Confederacy (from north to south):

Wabanaki Confederacy occupation areas
Mi'kmaq

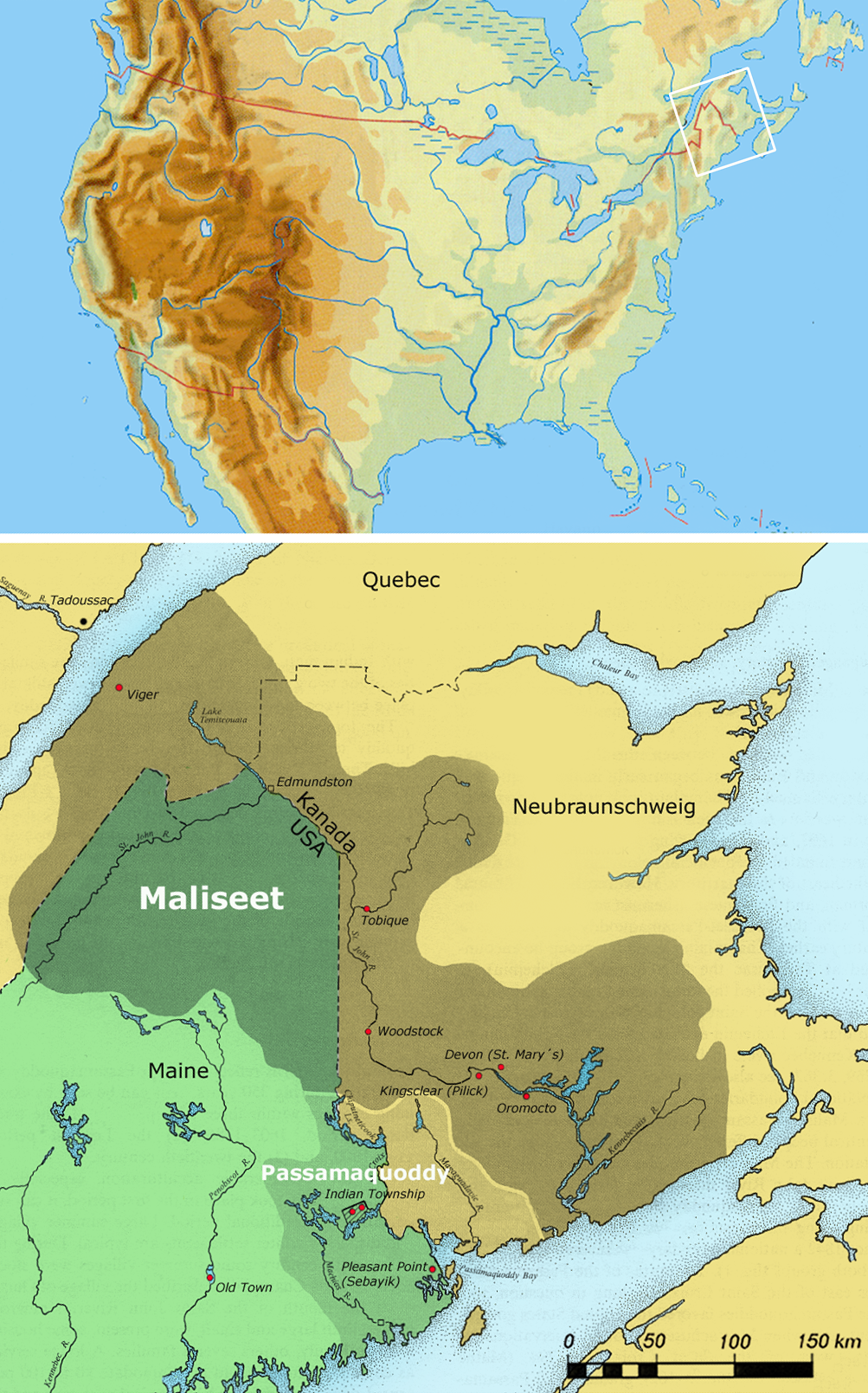
Wolastoqiyik,
Passamaquoddy

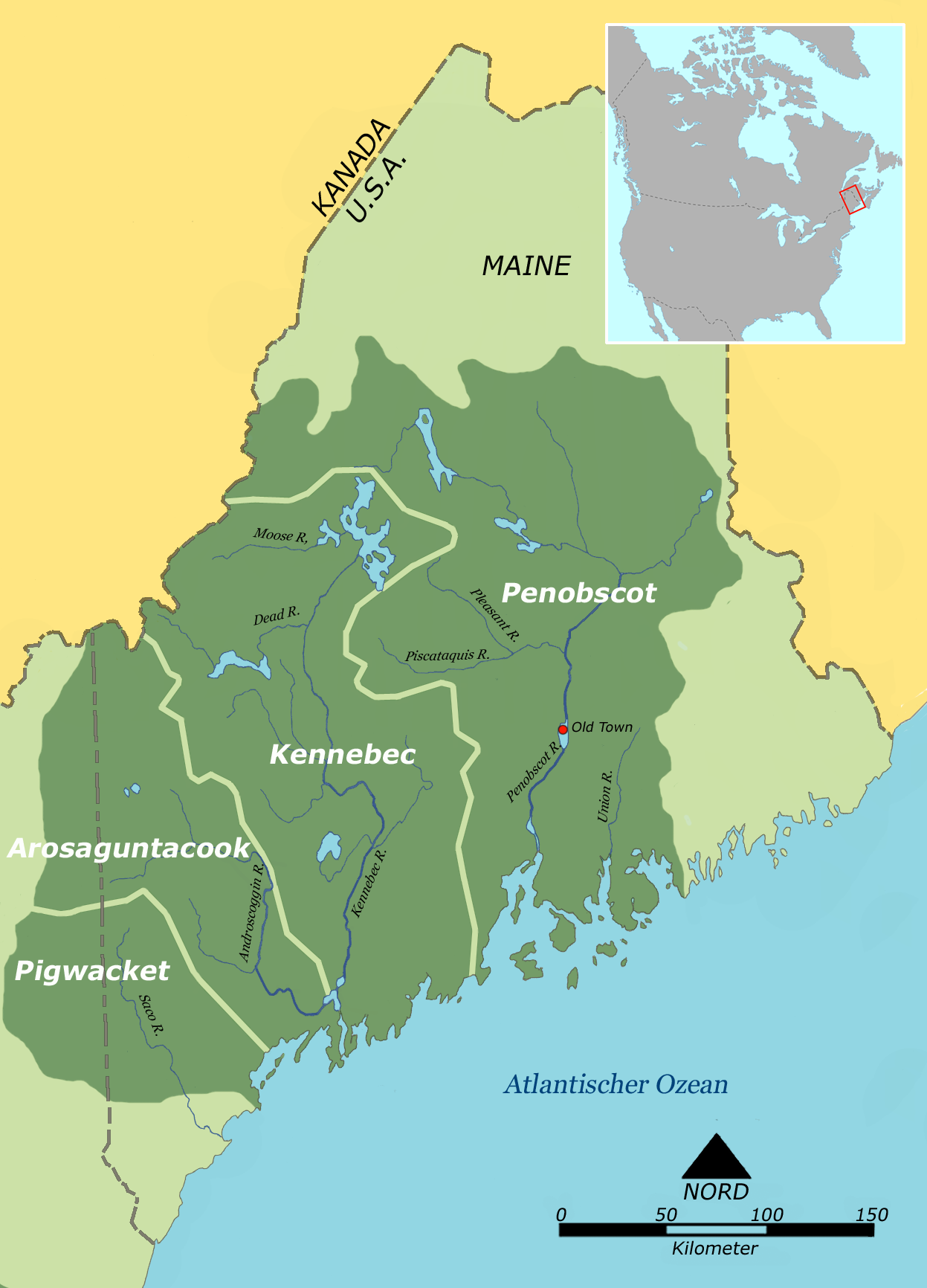
Eastern Abenaki (Penobscot, Kennebec, Arosaguntacook, Pigwacket / Pequawket)

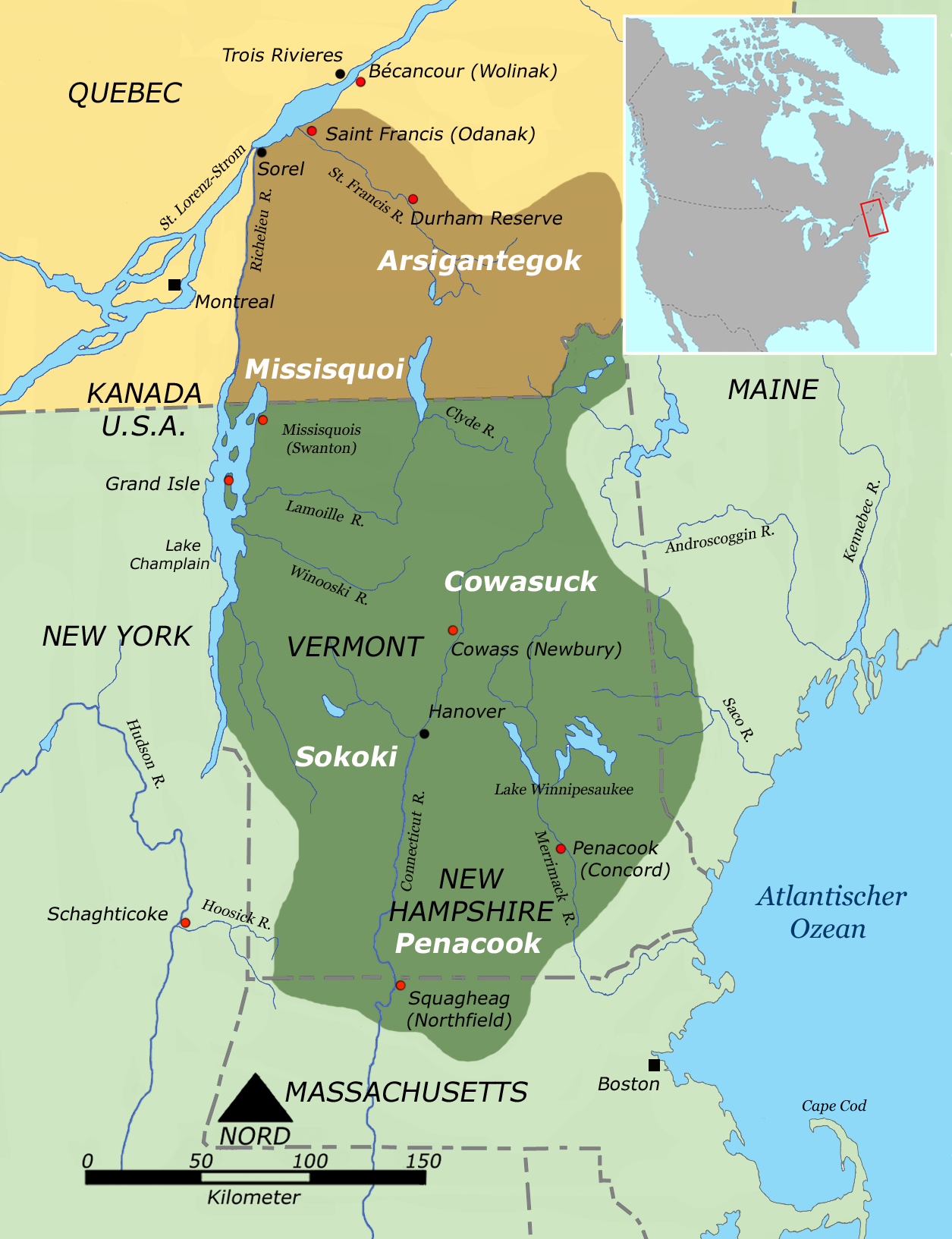
Western Abenaki (Arsigantegok, Missisquoi, Cowasuck, Sokoki, Pennacook)

== Notable historic Abenaki people ==
Please list people under their First Nation when applicable.

- Indian Joe (c. 1739–1819), an 18th-century Mi'kmaq scout, adopted by the Abenaki
- Mitchell Sabattis (c. 1821–1906), 19th-century Abenaki Adirondack pioneer and guide
- Joseph Laurent (1839–1917), chief, author, language advocate, businessman
- Henry Lorne Masta (1853–1943), chief, language advocate, and author
- Emma Camp Mead (1866–1934), Oneida herbalist and hotel keeper (father was Abenaki)
- Dark Cloud (Elijah Tahamont) (1855–1918), silent film actor

== Notable contemporary Abenaki people ==
Please list people under their First Nation.

- Annick Obonsawin (born 1983), Canadian actress
- Kim O'Bomsawin (born 1983), Canadian filmmaker
- Alanis Obomsawin (born 1932) Odanak citizen and American-Canadian filmmaker best known for Kanehsatake: 270 Years of Resistance
- Mali Obomsawin (born 1995), Odanak citizen and American bassist
- Michelle O'Bonsawin (born 1974), Canada's first Indigenous Supreme Court Justice

== See also ==
- Mount Pemigewasset

== Bibliography ==
- Aubery, Joseph, Fr. and Stephen Laurent, 1995. Father Aubery's French-Abenaki Dictionary: English translation. S. Laurent (Translator). Chisholm Bros. Publishing
- Baker, C. Alice, 1897. True Stories of New England Captives Carried to Canada during the Old French and Indian Wars. Press of E.A. Hall & Company, Greenfield, Massachusetts
- Charland, Thomas-M. (O.P.), 1964. Les Abenakis D'Odanak: Histoire des Abénakis D'Odanak (1675–1937). Les Éditions du Lévrier, Montreal, QC
- Coleman, Emma Lewis. New England Captives Carried to Canada: Between 1677 and 1760 During the French and Indian Wars, Heritage Books, 1989 (reprint 1925).
- Day, Gordon, 1981. The Identity of the Saint Francis Indians, National Museums of Canada, Ottawa, National Museum Of Man Mercury Series ISSN 0316-1854, Canadian Ethnology Service Paper No. 71 ISSN 0316-1862.
- Laurent, Joseph (1884). New Familiar Abenakis and English Dialogues. Quebec: Joseph Laurent (Sozap Lolô Kizitôgw), Abenakis, Chief of the Indian village of St. Francis, P.Q. Reprinted (paperback) Sept. 2006: Vancouver: Global Language Press, ISBN 0-9738924-7-1; Dec. 2009 (hardcover): Kessinger Publishings Legacy Reprint Series; and April 2010 (paperback): Nabu Press.
- Masta, Henry Lorne, 1932. Abenaki Legends, Grammar and Place Names. Victoriaville, PQ: La Voix Des Bois-Franes. Reprinted 2008: Toronto: Global Language Press, ISBN 978-1-897367-18-6
- Maurault, Joseph-Anselme (Abbot), 1866. Histoire des Abénakis, depuis 1605 jusqu'à nos jours. Published at L'Atelier typographique de la "Gazette de Sorel", QC
- Moondancer and Strong Woman, 2007. A Cultural History of the Native Peoples of Southern New England: Voices from Past and Present. Boulder, CO: Bauu Press, ISBN 0-9721349-3-X
