= Joseph Laurent =

Canadian-born Abenaki chief

- Sozap Lolô
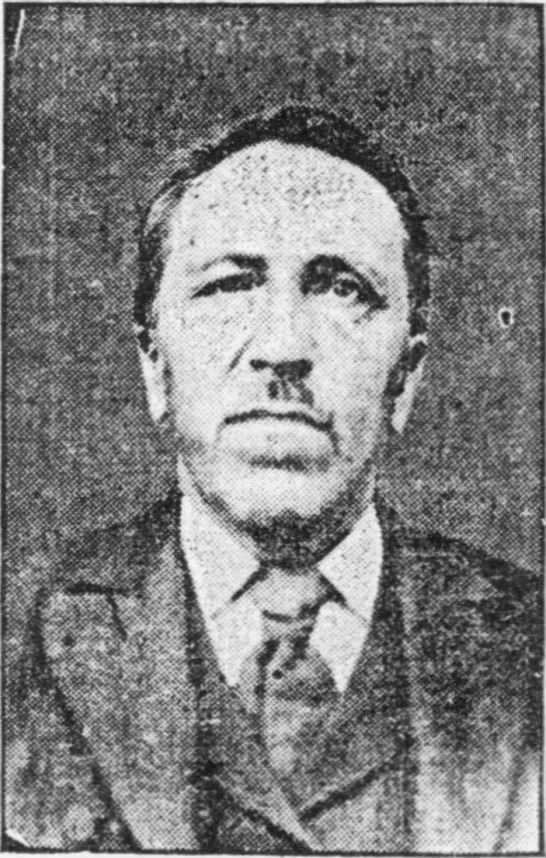
- Laurent, from The Boston Globe in 1901

Chief of the Abenaki reserve (1880–1892)

Personal details
- Born: 1839 Odanak, Lower Canada Québec
- Died: 1917 (aged 77–78)
- Occupation: Abenaki First Nation at Odanak; leader, teacher, trader, linguist
- Known for: New Familiar Abenakis and English Dialogues (1884)

Joseph Laurent (1839–1917), was an Abenaki chief at Odanak, best known for authoring an Abenaki language dictionary. He also established the Abenaki Indian Shop and Camp in Intervale, New Hampshire that is listed in the National Register of Historic Places.

== Biography ==
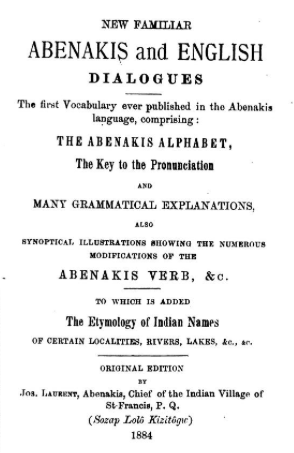
Inner title page from New Familiar Abenakis and English Dialogues

Laurent was chief of the Abenaki First Nation of Odanak in Quebec, Canada, from 1880 to 1892. He was a teacher and leader in the community. Laurent is best known for the publication of his book New Familiar Abenakis and English Dialogues. The book is a dictionary that translates Abenaki to English, and was the first of its kind. The structure of the dictionary is what widely sets it apart from others. His translations are set up as a journey through their land as opposed to a standard list. He takes the reader on a trip from Quebec and throughout New England through linguistics and language education. Despite Laurent's upbringing of speaking fluent Abenaki and French, he not only created a dictionary to teach English to Abenaki people, he more importantly created the substantial text in an effort to preserve the Abenaki language and culture. New Familiar Abenakis and English Dialogues was vital in taking the number of a hundred-plus speakers to the rest of the Abenaki population as they continued to be a part of an English-speaking world, and it is still widely used today.

Laurent was also an entrepreneur. He purchased goods from Odanak members and took them to his shop in Intervale, New Hampshire, to sell to tourists. The camp was located in a grove of white pines known as Cathedral Woods, across from the scenic overlook that sits on the border of North Conway and Intervale. They sold things like baskets, Victorian goods, and miniatures. It was not only a business opportunity, but was also a way for his family to practice speaking English. The trading post remained for 33 years, until Laurent's death in 1917. [there is more history re his shop and camp to add in. They came until 1960 when his second wife died, then his youngest son Stephen took over... then his grandson...citations coming from Concord Observer.]

In 1991, the establishment was listed in the National Register of Historic Places as "Abenaki Indian Shop and Camp".

Stephen Laurent (1909–2001), the youngest of Joseph Laurent's 18 children, was also an accomplished writer/linguist, and resided in Intervale from 1940 until his death.

== Marker erected by his children ==
In Memory of JOSEPH LAURENT Abenaki Chief Author of Abenaki & English Dialogues

Born 1839 — Died 1917, St. Francis Indian Reserve, Odanak, Quebec

In 1884 he led back to the land of their fathers a group of Abenaki and Sokoki Indians and established here in the woods of Intervale, a perennial summer settlement of his people.

ni odzi modzin nidali, ta wdali paiôn agmatta wdakik –– and he left that place and returned to his own country

Erected in love and reverence by his children in 1959.
