= List of Harvard University non-graduate alumni =

This is a list of some notable people who attended Harvard University, but did not graduate or have yet to graduate. See List of Harvard University people for a more comprehensive list of people affiliated with Harvard.

Name	Life	Known for	Relationship to Harvard
John Adams II	1803–1834	aide to his father President John Quincy Adams	Attended College; expelled prior to 1823 graduation; later among those designated as "Bachelor of Arts as of 1823" and admitted to roll of graduates
Vincent Astor	1891–1959	businessman and philanthropist	Attended College
F. Lee Bailey	1933–2021	lawyer	Attended College
William J. A. Bailey	1884–1949	Radithor scandal	Attended College
Andrew Beyer	born 1943	horse racing expert	Attended College
James Blake	born 1979	tennis player	Attended College 1997–1999
Rick Brewer	born 1956	president of Louisiana College in Pineville, Louisiana; former administrator at Charleston Southern University in North Charleston, South Carolina	Post-graduate study at Harvard
William Starling Burgess	1878–1947	aviator, yacht designer, automotive innovator, poet	Attended Harvard College 1897–1900
Frank Carlucci	1930–2018	United States secretary of defense	Attended Business School
Alistair Cooke	1908–2004	journalist, broadcaster	Visiting graduate student
Hamilton Coolidge	1895–1918	soldier	Attended College 1916 but dropped out to fight in World War I (killed in action); posthumously awarded an A.B. (War Degree), Harvard Class of 1919
Broderick Crawford	1911–1986	actor	Attended college after high school graduation but dropped out after three weeks
Vincent Cronin	1924–2011	historian, writer	Attended College
Matt Damon	born 1970	actor	Attended College
Eli Dershwitz	born 1995	2023 World Saber Champion, 2015 Under-20 World Saber Champion, and US Olympic saber fencer	Attending College
Paul Douglas	1892–1976	United States senator	Attended Graduate School
Bülent Ecevit	1925–2006	Turkish politician, statesman, poet, writer, scholar, and journalist, who served as the prime minister of Turkey	Attended Harvard University with a Rockefeller Foundation Fellowship Scholarship in 1957, studying social psychology and Middle East history for eight months; attended lectures on anti-communism with Olof Palme and Bertrand Russell and attended Henry Kissinger's Harvard International Seminar
Edmund Fanning	1739–1818	British colonial officer and governor	Given A.M. degree in 1764
John F. Fitzgerald	1863–1950	mayor of Boston, Massachusetts	Attended Harvard Medical School but dropped out in 1885 after father died
John Gould Fletcher	1886–1950	poet and philosopher	College (attended 1903–1907, but did not finish)
Benjamin Franklin	1706–1790	scientist	Never attended College; awarded an honorary degree in 1753 as Class of 1724
Frederik X of Denmark	born 1968	king of Denmark since 2024	Spent the 1992–1993 academic year at Harvard, studied political science under the name Frederik Henriksen
Robert Frost	1874–1963	poet	Attended College (1897–1899); awarded an honorary degree in 1937
Buckminster Fuller	1895–1983	designer, architect	Attended College
William Gaddis	1922–1998	novelist	Attended College
Bill Gates	born 1955	co-founder and chairman of Microsoft, entrepreneur, and philanthropist	Attended College (1973–1975); awarded an honorary Doctor of Laws in 2007
Frank Gehry	born 1929	architect	Attended Design School
Ruth Bader Ginsburg	1933–2020	associate justice of the Supreme Court of the United States	Attended Law School, later transferred to Columbia
James Halperin	born 1952	co-founder and chairman of Heritage Auctions, entrepreneur, and author	Attended College (1970–1972)
S. Herbert Hare	1888–1960	landscape architect, co-founder of Hare & Hare	Attended Design School
William Randolph Hearst	1863–1951	newspaper magnate	Attended College
Bruce Henderson	1915–1992	founder of the Boston Consulting Group	Attended the Business School
Joel Iacoomes	1644–1665	Native American student (Wampanoag)	Attended Harvard's Indian College; died in shipwreck at Nantucket before receiving his degree as Class of 1665; awarded a posthumous degree A.B. in 2011
Henry James	1843–1916	novelist	Attended Law School
Philip Kaufman	born 1936	film director, screenwriter	Attended Law School
John Key	born 1961	prime minister of New Zealand	Attended professional courses at the Business School
Dan Kiley	1912–2004	landscape architect, architect	Attended Design School
Edwin Land	1909–1991	inventor	Attended College; awarded honorary doctorate in 1957
William Harrington Leahy	1904–1986	rear admiral in the United States Navy, son of fleet admiral William D. Leahy	Attended Business School
Fred A. Leuchter	born 1943	inventor and execution equipment designer	Attended for post-graduate studies
Alan Lomax	1915–2002	musicologist	Attended College (1932–1933)
John Lomax	1867–1948	musicologist	Visiting student (1907)
Amory Lovins	born 1947	environmentalist	Attended College (1964–66)
Robert Lowell	1917–1977	poet	Attended College
James MacArthur	1937–2010	actor	Attended Harvard; dropped out in second year to become actor
Rosario Marin	born 1958	treasurer of the United States	Attended KSG Program for State and Local Government Executives
Tshilidzi Marwala	born 1971	academic, community leader, and businessman	Attended Harvard Business School
Dustin Moskovitz	born 1984	co-founder of Facebook, Inc.	Attended College
Ogden Nash	1902–1971	poet	Attended College (1920–21)
Benjamin Netanyahu	born 1949	prime minister of Israel	Attended College; studied political science
Gabe Newell	born 1962	co-founder of Valve	Attended College
Eugene O'Neill	1888–1953	playwright	Attended College
James Park	born 1976	co-founder and CEO of Fitbit	Attended College
Gram Parsons	1946–1973	father of country rock	Attended College
James Peck	1914–1993	civil rights and anti-war activist	Attended College
Ion Perdicaris	1840–1925	businessman and philanthropist	Attended College but left in second year
Mary Peters	born 1948	United States secretary of transportation	Attended KSG Program for State and Local Government Executives
Albert Pike	1809–1891	Confederate general	Attended but then chose not to attend college because of fees
Cole Porter	1891–1964	composer	Attended Law and Graduate Schools
David Endicott Putnam	1898–1918	soldier	Attended College 1917 but dropped out to fight in World War I (killed in action); posthumously awarded an S.B. (War Degree), Harvard Class of 1920
Bonnie Raitt	born 1949	singer, songwriter	Attended Radcliffe
John Ray	born 1970	appraiser	Attended Graduate School
Richard Read	born 1957	two-time Pulitzer Prize winner	Nieman fellow (1996–97)
Eden Riegel	born 1981	actress	Attended College (1998–2000)
Laurance Spelman Rockefeller	1910–2004	businessman and philanthropist	Attended College but dropped out when he decided not to be a lawyer
Quentin Roosevelt	1897–1918	soldier	Attended College 1916 but dropped out to fight in World War I (killed in action); posthumously awarded an A.B. (War Degree), Harvard Class of 1919
Anita Sarko		disc jockey and writer	Attended Summer School
Pete Seeger	1919–2014	songwriter, singer, activist	Attended College
Birendra Bir Bikram Shah	1945–2001	late king of Nepal	Attended for one year (1967–1968)
Robert Gould Shaw	1837–1863	abolitionist, Union Army colonel	Attended College (1856–1859); killed in American Civil War
Harry Shearer	born 1943	actor, writer	Attended Graduate School
Hoskins Sotutu	Born 1998	rugby player, mathematician	Attended College for 6 months
Wallace Stevens	1879–1955	poet	Special student (1897–1900)
Adlai Stevenson	1900–1965	1952 and 1956 Democratic U.S. presidential nominee, governor of Illinois	Attended Law School
Rajesh Talwar		former United Nations staff member	Attended Harvard Kennedy School of Government
Jonathan Taylor Thomas	born 1981	actor	Attended College (2001–2002)
Daniel Cosío Villegas	1898–1976	economist, historian	Student
David Foster Wallace	1962–2008	writer	Attended graduate school
David Kenyon Webster	1922–1961	soldier, journalist, and author; was profiled in Band of Brothers	Attended College one semester; dropped out to fight in WWII
John Wentworth	1815–1888	Mayor of Chicago	Attended Law School in 1841
Marjorie Williams	1958–2005	writer	Dropped out after junior year
Charles W. Woodworth	1865–1940	entomologist	Studied under Hermann August Hagen 1886–1888, 1900–1901
Isoroku Yamamoto	1884–1943	World War II vaval marshal general, Imperial Japanese Navy	Visiting student (1919–1921)
Mark Zuckerberg	born 1984	founder and CEO of Facebook	Left College in his second year
