= Hiacoomes =

- Born: ~ 1610s Holmes Hole (now Vineyard Haven); Martha's Vineyard (Wampanoag: Noepe)
- Died: 1690; Martha's Vineyard (Wampanoag: Noepe)
- Other names: Hiacoomb, I-a-coomes, Hiacombs, Hiacoms, Iacomes, Jacomes, Jacoms, Sacomas
- Citizenship: Wampanoag
- Known for: First Wampanoag to convert to Christianity
- Children: several including Joel Hiacoomes

Hiacoomes (~1610s – 1690) was a Wampanoag American Indian from the island of Martha's Vineyard, (Wampanoag: Noepe), who in 1643 became the first member of his society to convert to Christianity under the tutelage of the missionary Thomas Mayhew Jr. He would then, with the assistance of Mayhew, become a leading preacher to his fellow Wampanoag on the island, playing a major role in the widespread conversion of the Wampanoag from their traditional beliefs to Christianity.

== Early life and contact with the English ==
Little is known of Hiacoomes' early life except that he was of 'mean' descent and described as "a man of a sad and sober spirit" who had a low ranking in the then existing social hierarchy of the Wampanoag. In 1639 the first English settlement of the island, under the direction of Thomas Mayhew Senior, had begun at Edgartown. Hiacoomes took an unusual interest in these newcomers and eventually began to form relationships with some of the English with whom he visited in their houses and they in his wigwam. He even attended religious meetings, where he managed to catch the curiosity of Thomas Mayhew Junior (1618?–1657), son of the island's governor and local pastor to the English. Seeing this curiosity, the younger Mayhew invited Hiacoomes to his house each Sabbath evening where the soon-to-be missionary to the Indians would teach and instruct his native charge in the doctrines and ideas of Puritanism. Under his direction, Hiacoomes became a professed Christian, learning how to read in the process. A letter reference dating from 1651 puts him at that moment as about 30 years of age, so if that is to be believed then Hiacoomes at this stage would have been in his early-to-mid 20s.

== As a Christian ==
At first Hiacoomes mostly faced opposition from his fellow Wampanoag, some of whom mocked him and called him "an English man". Opposition from sachems to this English innovation was widespread. However, in 1646 an epidemic hit the island devastating the native population, following a similar epidemic which had occurred three years earlier. It is estimated that about half of the native population of the island perished in these plagues. But Hiacoomes and his family were unaffected. That, and the use of cures by Thomas Mayhew Junior, gave a medical appeal to Christianity in a place where traditional shamanism had failed. This interest was transferred to a group of sachems, led by Miohqsoo and Towanquatick, who invited Hiacoomes to a meeting six miles away late at night where he was to discuss his religion with these sachems. The records of this discussion are described in Experience Mayhew's Indian Converts:

Hiacoomes being come, Miohqsoo gladly received him, and told him what he desired of him; the sum whereof was, that he would shew his heart to them, and let them know how it stood towards God, and what they ought to do.

Hiacoomes very gladly embraced this call and opportunity to instruct them, declaring to them all Things which he himself had learned, concerning God the Father, Son and Holy Ghost, shewing them what this God did for Mankind, and what their Duty was towards him.

Having finished his speech, Miohqsoo asked him, How many Gods the English worshipped? Hiacoomes answered ONE, and no more. Whereupon Miohqsoo reckoned up about 37 principal Gods which he had; and shall I, said he, throw away all these 37 for the sake of one only? What do you your self think, said Hiacoomes? For my part I have thrown away all these, and many more, some Years ago, and yet I am preserved as you see this Day. You speak true, Said Miohqsoo; and therefore I will throw away all my Gods too, and serve that one God with you

From this point on, with greater community support Hiacoomes began preaching more openly on theological topics such as sin, the Trinity, the fall of Adam and the redeeming role of faith in Christ. He especially attacked the shamans, who were deemed to be agents of the Devil by the English as well as being seen as the principal source of opposition to the new faith. At one point after Hiacoomes’ conversion, Daniel Gookin reports that he underwent a test of temptation after his wife suffered in labour for several days. It was unlikely for Wampanoag women to have difficulty in childbirth, and so a few of the Wampanoag told Hiacoomes to seek out one of the tribe's shamans to help provide his wife with relief from the unbearable pain. However, Hiacoomes denied this request since by now he firmly believed that an alliance with the practices of the Shamans would align him with the devil. Instead, he called upon Thomas Mayhew Junior, who gathered a group of other English Christians on the Vineyard to pray for the couple. This endeavour would see success, and Hiacoomes’ wife shortly after delivered a daughter whose name translated to ‘Return’ in English. In 1649 he publicly faced down the shamans by challenging them to kill him using their magic, which he said was inferior to that of God. He survived and this failure must have helped discredit the shamans as it was followed by a rash of conversions. By 1651 Christian Practices were already spreading quickly throughout the community and according to Thomas Mayhew Junior, there were already 199 Wampanoag who "professed themselves to be worshippers of ... God". Several of these converts were ex-shamans. By then, Hiacoomes was preaching twice every Sunday in sermons agreed upon with Mayhew who was still very much teaching and instructing his first charge.

== Later life ==
In this path he continued for the rest of his life, although greatly interrupted by the untimely death of Thomas Mayhew Junior in 1657, but despite this setback, he continued to play a major role in spreading Christianity, so that by 1660 nearly all the island's Wampanoag community had formally become Christian. Even as late as 1674, Hiacoomes was still seen by one English commentator as the leading "Indian teacher" on the island. By then, it was Wampanoag missionaries themselves and not English ones who were leading the conversion charge. He had several children, one of whom, Joel or Ioel, was one of the five Indian students who attended Harvard Indian College during its brief existence but died while there. His youngest son, Samuel, was placed in the care of Thomas Mayhew Junior where he learnt Christian principles and how to read in both English and his own language. In 1670, under the aegis of John Eliot and John Cotton Jr., the first formal Indian church was created on the island, with Hiacoomes ordained as minister alongside John Tackanash. He gave the funeral oration after the latter's death in 1683. He died in 1690. Several members of his family and descendants would also become leading Christian Indians on the island.

== Bibliography ==
- Axtell, James, The Invasion Within: The Contest of Cultures in Colonial North America (Oxford University Press, New York, 1985)
- Gookin, Daniel, Historical Collections of the Indians in New England of their several nations, numbers, customs, manners, religion and government, before the English Planted there (Boston, 1674)
- Mayhew, Experience, Indian Converts, or some Account of the Lives and Dying Speeches of a considerable number of the Christianized Indians of Martha's Vineyard in New England (London, 1727)
- Silverman, David J, Faith and Boundaries: Colonists, Christianity, and Community among the Wampanoag Indians of Martha's Vineyard, 1600–1871 (Cambridge University Press, New York, 2005)
- Silverman, David J, Indians, Missionaries, and Religious Translation: Creating Wampanoag Christianity in Seventeenth-Century Martha's Vineyard in The William and Mary Quarterly, Third Series, Vol. 62, No. 2 (Apr 2005), pp. 141–174
- Simmons, William S, Conversion from Indian to Puritan in The New England Quarterly, Vol. 52, No.2 (Jun 1979), pp. 197–218
- Whitfield, Henry, Strength out of Weakness: Or a Glorious Manifestation of the Further Progress of the Gospel among the Indians in New England (London, 1652 [New York, 1865])
- Whitfield, Henry, The Light Appearing More and More Towards the Perfect Day or A farther Discovery of the Present State of the Indians in New England concerning the progresse of the Gospel Amongst Them (London, 1651)
