= Harvard College =

Undergraduate college of Harvard University in Massachusetts

- Type: Private undergraduate college
- Established: 1636; 390 years ago
- Parent institution: Harvard University
- Dean: David Deming
- Students: 6,755
- Location: Cambridge, Massachusetts, United States; 42.374°N 71.117°W
- Campus: Urban
- Website: college.harvard.edu

Harvard College is the undergraduate college of Harvard University. It is administered by the Faculty of Arts and Sciences.

The college offers Bachelor of Arts and Bachelor of Science degree programs. It is highly selective, with 3.5 percent of applicants being offered admission as of 2023. Harvard College students participate in over 450 extracurricular organizations and nearly all live on campus. First-year students reside in or near Harvard Yard while upperclass students reside in other on-campus housing.

== History ==
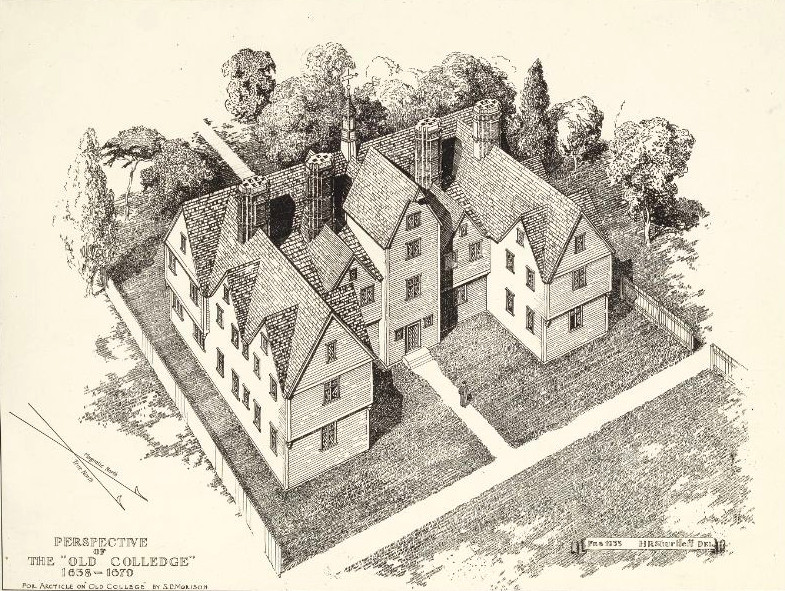
Harvard College's first building, as imagined by historian Samuel Eliot Morison

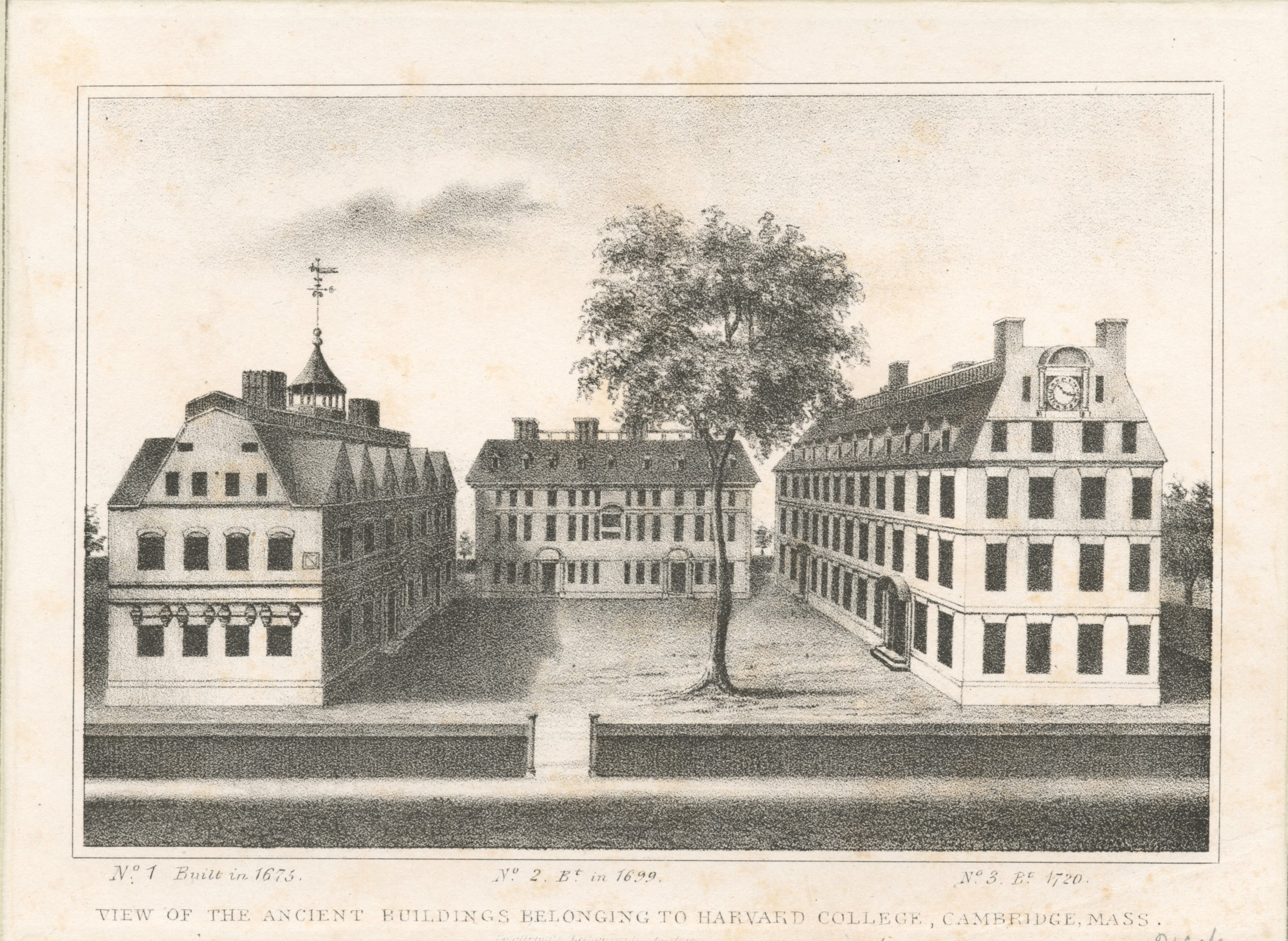
Harvard during the colonial era, with the surviving Massachusetts Hall on the right

Harvard College was founded in 1636 by vote of the Great and General Court of the Massachusetts Bay Colony. Two years later, the college became home to North America's first known printing press, carried by the ship John of London. In 1639 the college (heretofore unnamed) was named Harvard College in honor of deceased Charlestown minister John Harvard (1607–1638) who had bequeathed to the school his entire library and half of his monetary estate.

Harvard's first Headmaster was Nathaniel Eaton (1610–1674); in 1639, he also became its first instructor to be dismissed, for overstrict discipline. The school's first students were graduated in 1642.

The Harvard Indian College was established, with the capacity for four or five Native Americans, and in 1665 Caleb Cheeshahteaumuck (c. 1643–1666) "from the Wampanoag … did graduate from Harvard, the first Indian to do so in the colonial period."

The University of Oxford and University of Cambridge, two of the oldest and most prestigious universities in the English-speaking world, have long been structured with individual colleges as part of the larger university and with each college including an association of scholars that shared room and board. Harvard's founders may have envisioned it as the first in a series of sibling colleges replicating the Oxford and Cambridge model, which would eventually constitute a university, though no further colleges materialized in the colonial era. The Indian College was active from 1640 to no later than 1693, but it was a minor addition not operated in federation with Harvard according to the English model.

In the late 18th century, Harvard began granting graduate and doctorate-level degrees, and in 1780 the Constitution of Massachusetts recognized it as a university. In 1783, a new medical school was established as the Medical Institution of Harvard University. Harvard as a whole was increasingly called Harvard University, with Harvard College becoming the name of the university's undergraduate division in particular.

Harvard College is currently responsible for undergraduate admissions, advising, housing, student life, athletics, and other undergraduate matters except instruction, which is the purview of the Harvard Faculty of Arts and Sciences. The body known as the President and Fellows of Harvard College retains its traditional name despite having governance of the entire university. Radcliffe College, established in 1879, originally paid Harvard faculty to repeat their lectures for women. Since the 1970s, Harvard has been responsible for undergraduate matters for women, though women's Harvard diplomas were countersigned by the President of Radcliffe until a final merger in 1999.

== Admissions ==
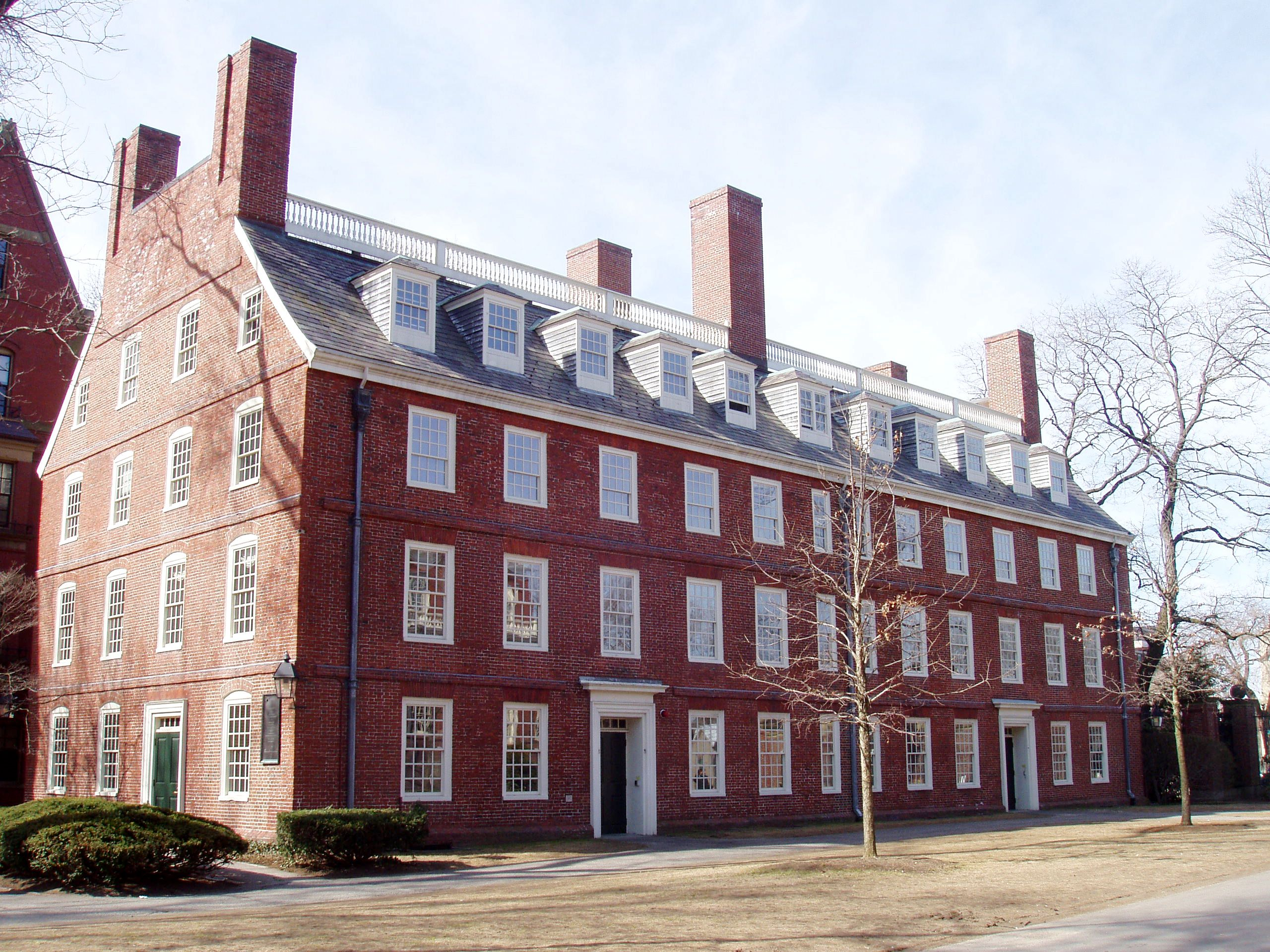
Massachusetts Hall, built in 1720, is the oldest surviving building on the Harvard campus.

Admission is based on academic prowess, extracurricular activities, and personal qualities. For the undergraduate class of 2025, Harvard had 57,435 applications and accepted 1,968 (3.4% acceptance rate). For the undergraduate class of 2023, the middle 50% range of SAT scores of enrolled freshmen was 710–770 for reading and writing and 750–800 for math, while the middle 50% range of the ACT composite score was 33–35. The average high school grade point average (GPA) was 4.18. The acceptance rate for transfer students has been approximately 1%. Harvard consistently ranks first in the enrollment of recipients of the National Merit $2,500 Scholarship; it enrolled 207 such scholars in the Class of 2022.

Harvard College ended its early admissions program in 2007, but for the class of 2016 and beyond, an early action program was reintroduced. The freshman class that entered in the fall of 2017 was the first to be majority (50.8%) nonwhite.

A federal lawsuit alleges that Harvard's admissions policies discriminate against Asian Americans, who tend to be overrepresented among students with high academic achievement.

A 2019 district court decision in the case (which has since been appealed) found no evidence of explicit racial bias but did not rule out a small amount of implicit bias. Harvard has implemented more implicit bias training for its admissions staff in accordance with the court's recommendations. In addition, Harvard's admissions preference for children of alumni, employees, and donors has been criticized as favoring white and wealthy candidates.

The median family income of Harvard students is $168,800, with 53% of students coming from the top 10% highest-earning families and 20% from the bottom 60%.

As of 2024, Harvard College tuition was about $57,000 and total costs about $83,000. However, Harvard offers one of the most generous financial aid programs in the United States, with need-blind admission and 100% of financial need met for all students. Families with incomes below $85,000 pay nothing for their children to attend, while families earning up to $150,000 pay no more than 10% of their annual incomes. Financial aid is solely based on need; no merit or athletic scholarships are offered.

== Academics ==
The four-year, full-time undergraduate program has a liberal arts and sciences focus. To graduate in the usual four years, undergraduates normally take four courses per semester.

Midway through the second year, most undergraduates join one of fifty academic majors; many also declare a minor (secondary field). Joint majors (combining the requirements of two majors) and special majors (of the student's own design) are also possible. Most majors lead to the Artium Baccalaureus (AB). Some award the Scientiae Baccalaureus (SB). There are also dual degree programs permitting students to earn both a Harvard AB and a Master of Music (MM) from either the New England Conservatory of Music or the Berklee College of Music over five years.

In most majors, an honors degree requires advanced coursework and/or a senior thesis.

Harvard College students must take a course in each of four General Education categories (Aesthetics and Culture; Ethics and Civics; Histories, Societies, Individuals; Science and Technology in Society) as well as a course in each of three academic divisions (Arts and Humanities; Social Sciences; Science and Engineering and Applied Science). They must also fulfill foreign language, expository writing, and quantitative reasoning with data requirements. Exposure to a range of intellectual areas in parallel with pursuit of a chosen major in depth fulfills the injunction of former Harvard president Abbott Lawrence Lowell that liberal education should produce "men who know a little of everything and something well".

Some introductory courses have large enrollments, but most courses are small: the median class size is 12 students. Funding and faculty mentorship for research is available in all disciplines for undergraduates at all levels.

== Student life ==
=== House system ===
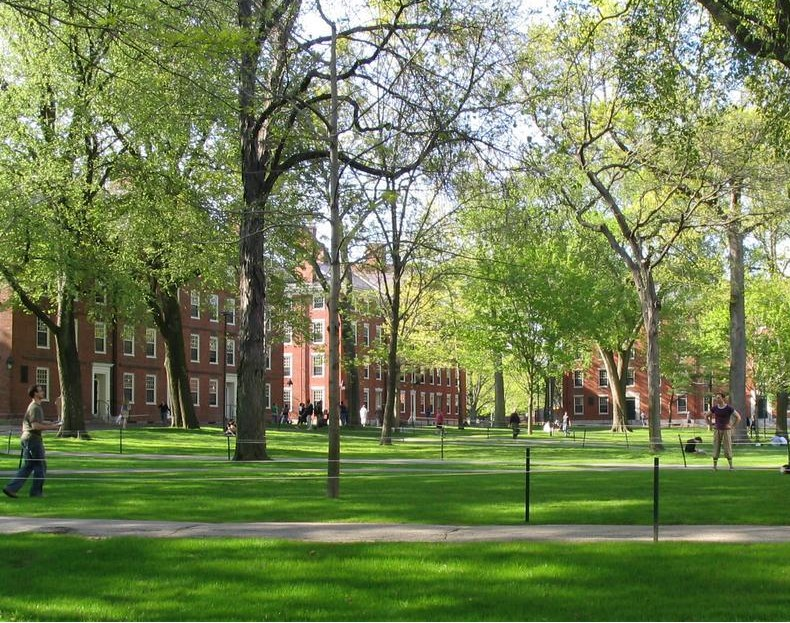
Harvard College's freshman dormitories in Harvard Yard

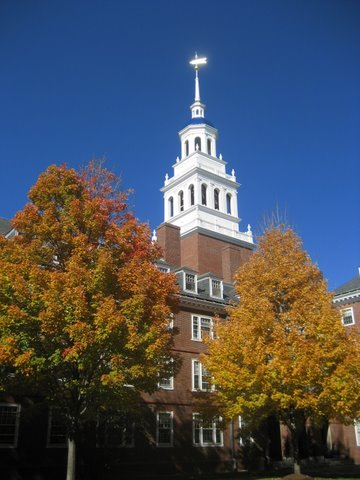
Lowell House

Nearly all undergraduates live on campus, for the first year in dormitories in or near Harvard Yard and later in the upperclass houses—administrative subdivisions of the college as well as living quarters, providing a sense of community in what might otherwise be a socially incohesive and administratively daunting university environment. Each house is presided over by two faculty deans, while its Allston Burr Resident Dean — an Assistant Dean of the college who is usually an appointed lecturer or a junior faculty member in the Faculty of Arts and Sciences — supervises undergraduates' day-to-day academic and disciplinary well-being.

The faculty deans and resident dean are assisted by other members of the Senior Common Room—select graduate students (tutors), faculty, and university officials brought into voluntary association with each house. The faculty deans and resident dean reside in the house, as do resident tutors. Terms like tutor, Senior Common Room, and Junior Common Room reflect a debt to the constituent college systems at Oxford and Cambridge from which Harvard's system took inspiration.

The houses were created by President Lowell in the 1930s to combat what he saw as pernicious social stratification engendered by the private, off-campus living arrangements of many undergraduates at that time. Lowell's solution was to provide every man—Harvard was male-only at the time—with on-campus accommodations throughout his time at the college; Lowell also saw great benefits in other features of the house system, such as the relaxed discussions—academic or otherwise—which he hoped would take place among undergraduates and members of the Senior Common Room over meals in each house's dining hall.

How students come to live in particular houses has changed greatly over time. Under the original "draft" system, masters (now called "faculty deans") negotiated privately over the assignment of students. From the 1960s to the mid-1990s, each student ranked the houses according to personal preference, with a lottery resolving the oversubscription of more popular houses. Today, groups of one to eight freshmen form a block which is then assigned, essentially at random, to an upperclass house.

The nine "River Houses" are south of Harvard Yard, near the Charles River: Adams, Dunster, Eliot, Kirkland, Leverett, Lowell, Mather, Quincy, and Winthrop. Their construction was financed largely by a 1928 gift from Yale alumnus Edward Harkness, who, frustrated in his attempts to initiate a similar project at his alma mater, eventually offered $11 million to Harvard. (Note: Harkness' gift was anonymous, at least at first. "I have forgotten the gentleman's name", Harvard's President Lowell told the faculty in making the initial announcement. "I told him I would.")

Construction of the first houses began in 1929, but the land on which they were built had been assembled decades before. After graduating from Harvard in 1895, Edward W. Forbes found himself inspired by the Oxford and Cambridge systems during two years of study in England; on returning to the United States he set out to acquire the land between Harvard Yard and the Charles River that was not already owned by Harvard or an associated entity. By 1918, that ambition had been largely fulfilled and the assembled land transferred to Harvard.

The three Quad Houses, Cabot, Currier, and Pforzheimer House, enjoy a residential setting half a mile northwest of Harvard Yard. These were built by Radcliffe College and housed Radcliffe College students until the Harvard and Radcliffe residential systems merged in 1977. A thirteenth house, Dudley Community, formerly called Dudley House, is nonresidential but fulfills the administrative and social functions provided to on-campus residents by the other twelve houses for undergraduate students living in the Dudley Co-op, many of the undergraduate students living off-campus (which are small in number), and the Visiting Undergraduate Students who study at Harvard for a term or year. Harvard's residential houses are paired with Yale's residential colleges in sister relationships.

=== Student government ===
The Harvard Undergraduate Council (UC) was the student government of Harvard College until it was abolished by a student referendum in 2022. It was replaced by the Harvard Undergraduate Association (HUA).

=== Athletics ===
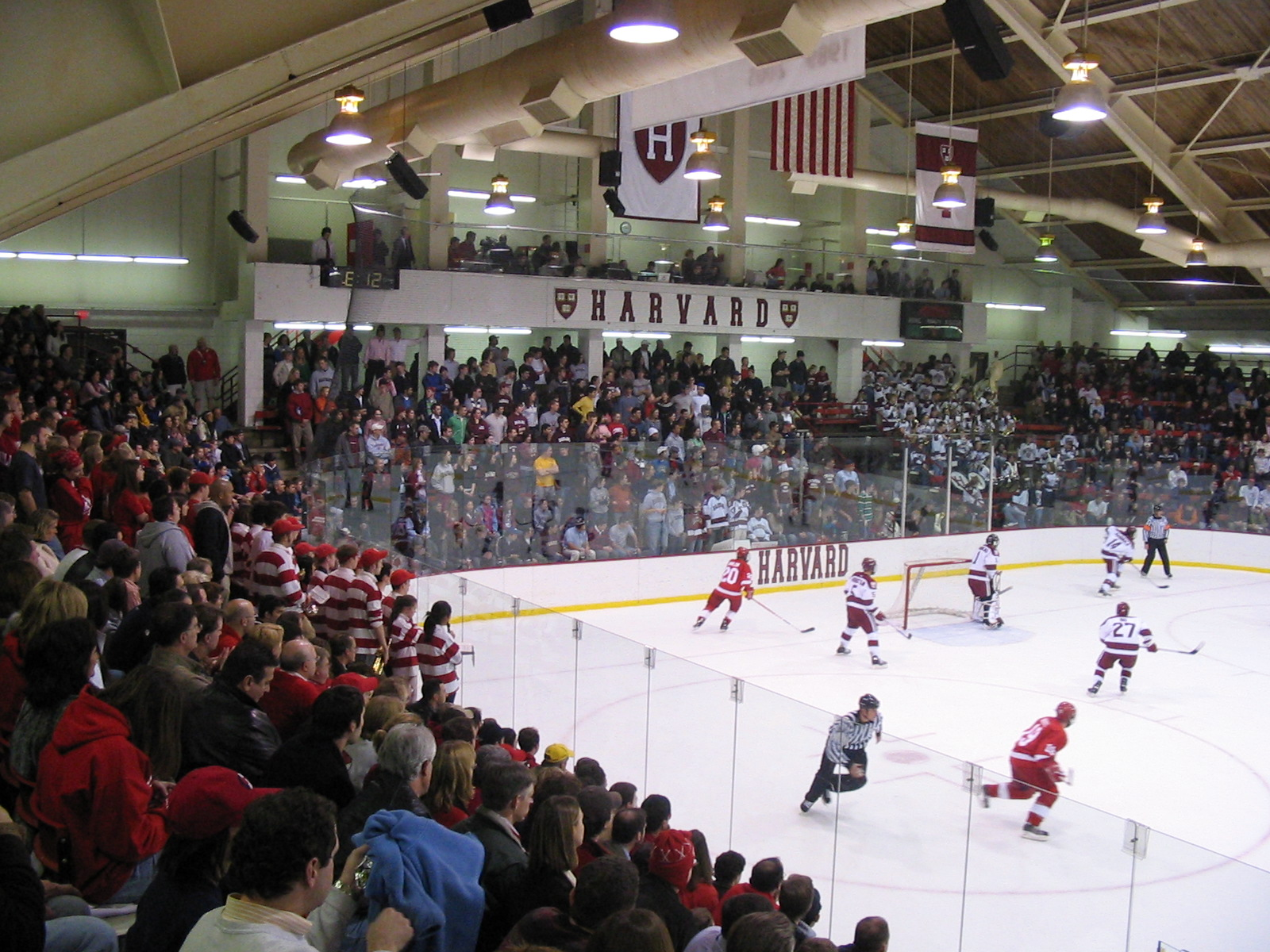
The Cornell–Harvard hockey rivalry match in 2006

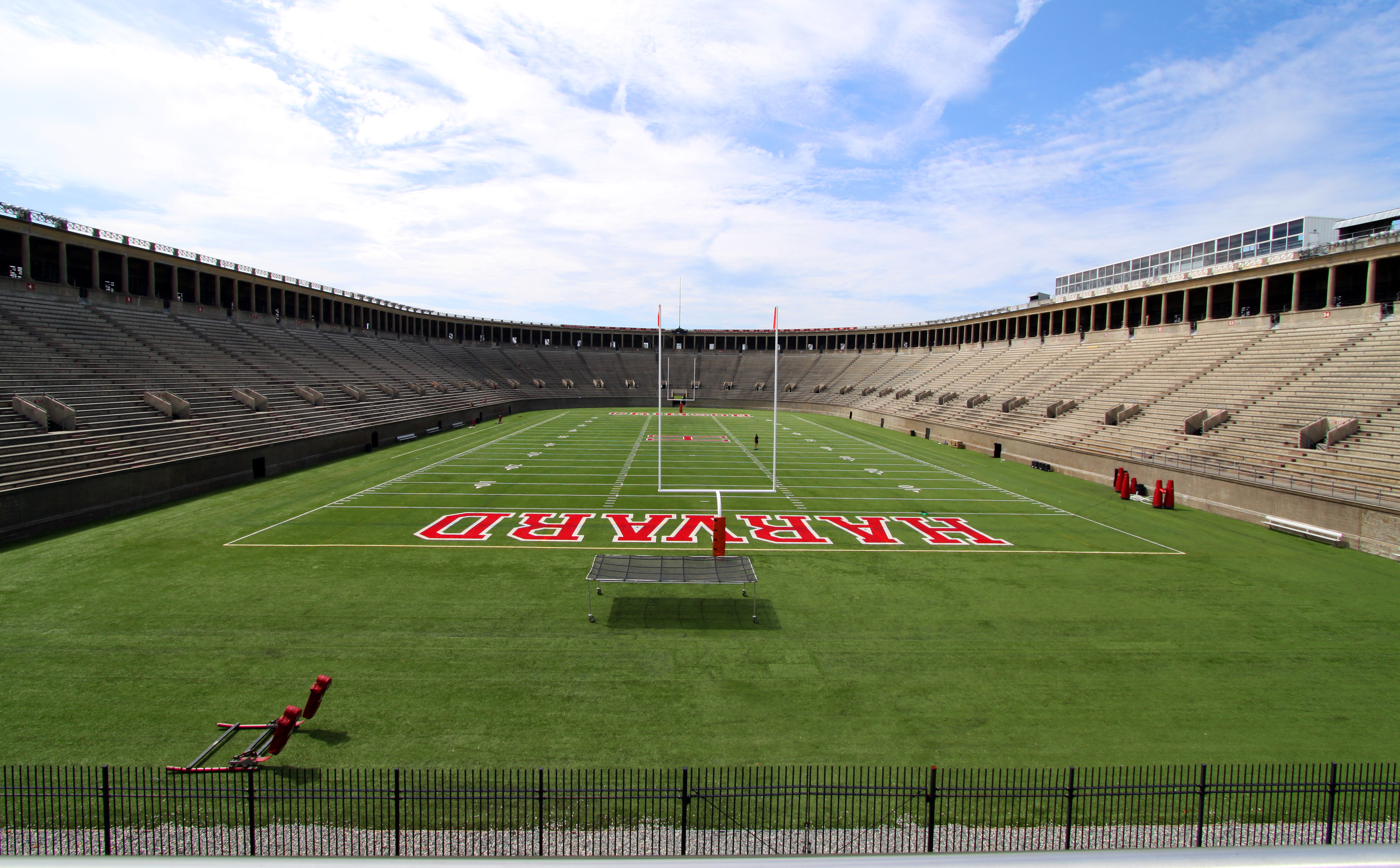
Harvard Stadium, home of Harvard Crimson and the Boston Cannons

The Harvard Crimson fields 42 intercollegiate sports teams in the NCAA Division I Ivy League, more than any other NCAA Division I college in the country. Every two years, the Harvard and Yale track and field teams come together to compete against a combined Oxford and Cambridge team in the oldest continuous international amateur competition in the world. As with other Ivy League universities, Harvard does not offer athletic scholarships.

Harvard's athletic rivalry with Yale is intense in every sport in which they meet, coming to a climax each fall in the annual football meeting, which dates back to 1875 and is usually called simply "The Game". While Harvard's football team is no longer one of the best as it was in football's early days, both Harvard and Yale have influenced the way the game is played. In 1903, Harvard Stadium introduced a new era into football with the first permanent reinforced concrete stadium of its kind in the country.

Even older than Harvard–Yale football rivalry, the Harvard–Yale Regatta is held each June on the Thames River in eastern Connecticut. The Harvard crew is typically considered to be one of the top teams in the country in rowing. Other sports in which Harvard teams are particularly strong are men's ice hockey, squash, and men's and women's fencing. Harvard's men's ice hockey team won the school's first NCAA Championship in any team sport in 1989, and Harvard also won the Intercollegiate Sailing Association National Championships in 2003. Harvard was the first Ivy League school to win an NCAA Championship in a women's sport when its women's lacrosse team won in 1990.

The school color is crimson, which is also the name of Harvard's sports teams and the student newspaper, The Harvard Crimson. The color was unofficially adopted (in preference to magenta) by an 1875 vote of the student body, although the association with some form of red can be traced back to 1858, when Charles William Eliot, a young graduate student who would later become Harvard's 21st and longest-serving president (1869–1909), bought red bandanas for his crew so they could more easily be distinguished by spectators at a regatta.

==== Fight songs ====
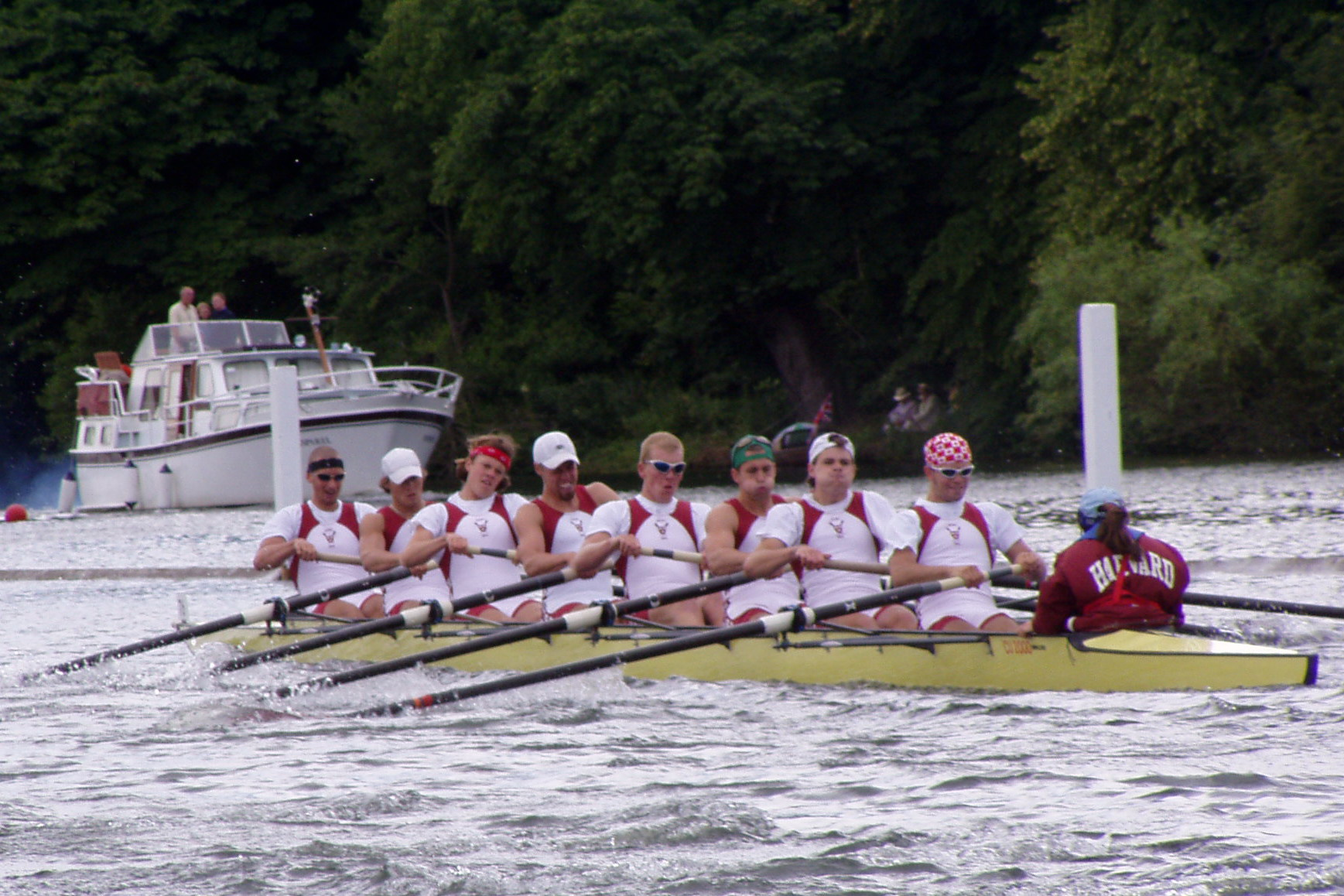
Harvard men's eight crew at Henley in 2004; founded in 1852, the Harvard–Yale Regatta is the oldest intercollegiate athletic rivalry in the United States.

Harvard has several fight songs, the most played of which, especially at football, are "Ten Thousand Men of Harvard" and "Harvardiana". While "Fair Harvard" is actually the alma mater, "Ten Thousand Men" is better known outside the university. The Harvard University Band performs these fight songs and other cheers at football and hockey games. These were parodied by Harvard alumnus Tom Lehrer in his song "Fight Fiercely, Harvard", which he composed while an undergraduate.

==== Athletics history ====
By the late 19th century, critics of intercollegiate athletics, including Harvard president Charles William Eliot, believed that sports had become over-commercialized and took students away from their studies. They called for limitations on all sports. This opposition prompted Harvard's athletic committee to target "minor" sports—basketball and hockey—for reform in order to deflect attention from the major sports: football, baseball, track, and crew. The committee made it difficult for the basketball team to operate by denying financial assistance and limiting the number of overnight away games in which the team could participate.

=== Student organizations ===
Harvard has more than 450 undergraduate student organizations. The Phillips Brooks House Association acts as an umbrella service organization.

== Notable alumni ==
Notable alumni include:

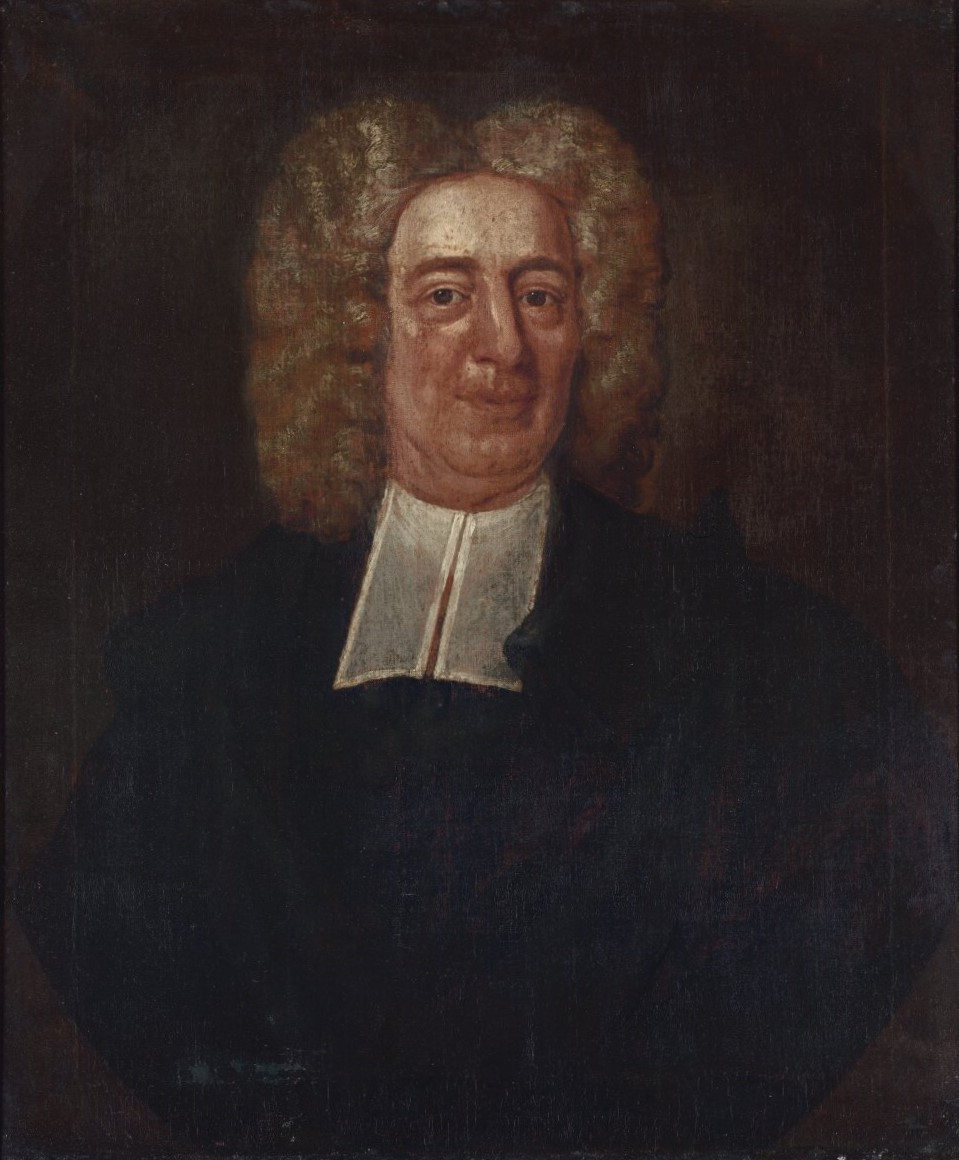
Minister, author, and pamphleteer Cotton Mather (AB, 1678)

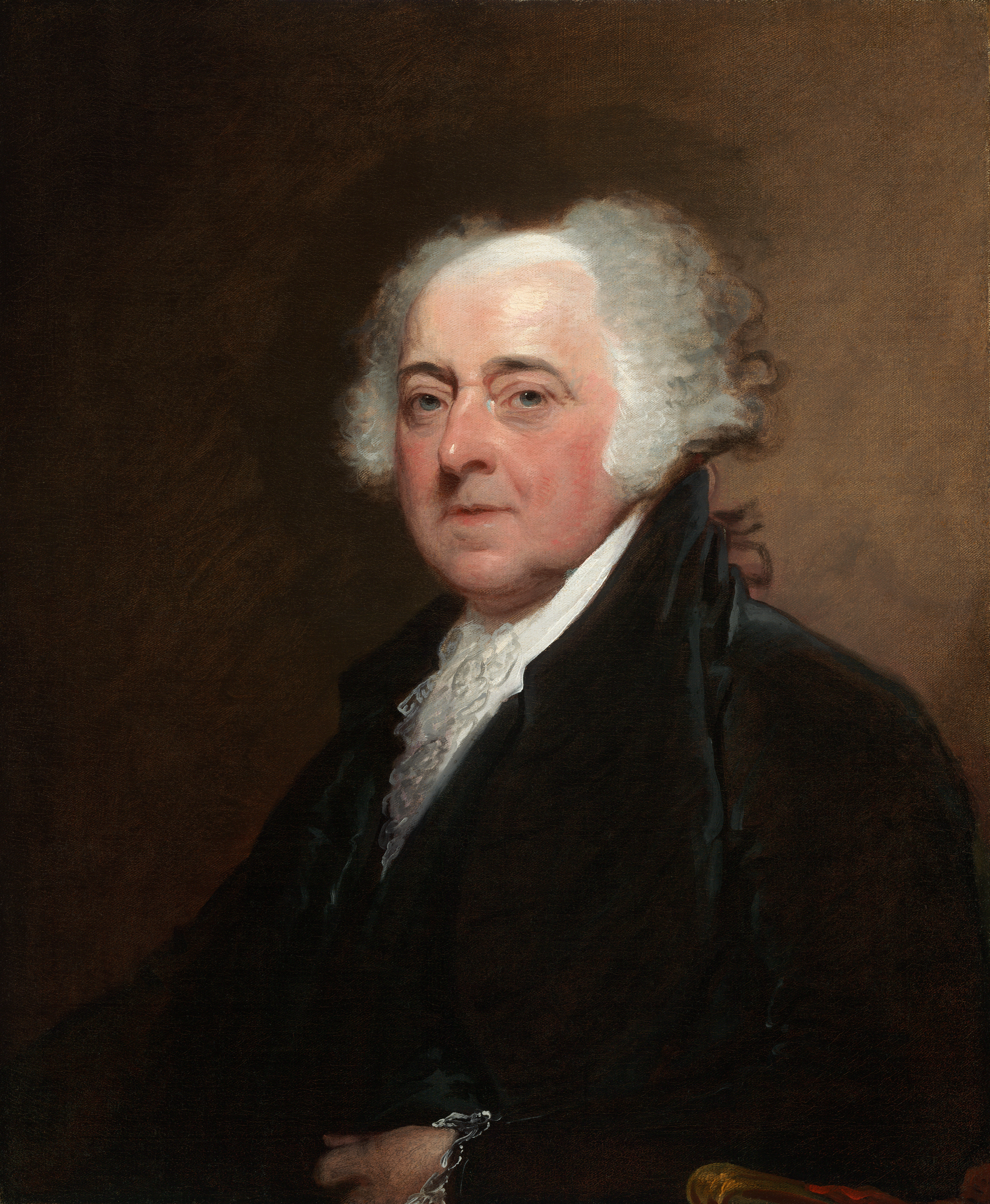
US president John Adams (AB, 1755)

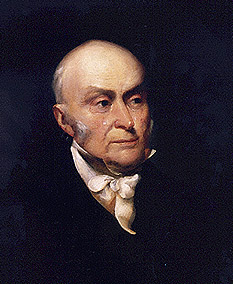
US president John Quincy Adams (AB, 1787)

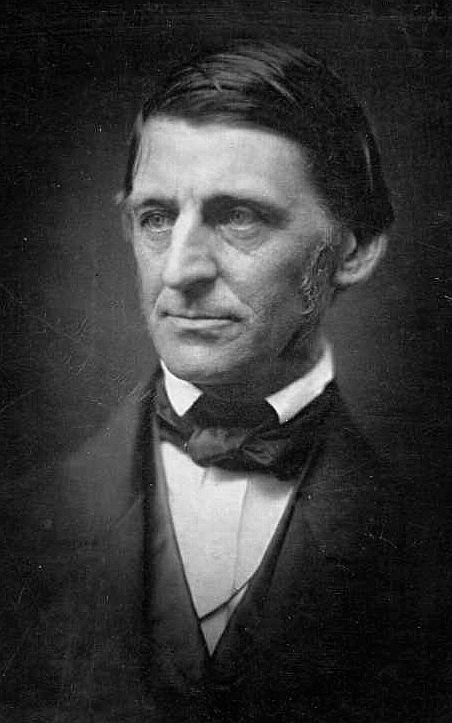
Philosopher and poet Ralph Waldo Emerson (AB, 1821)

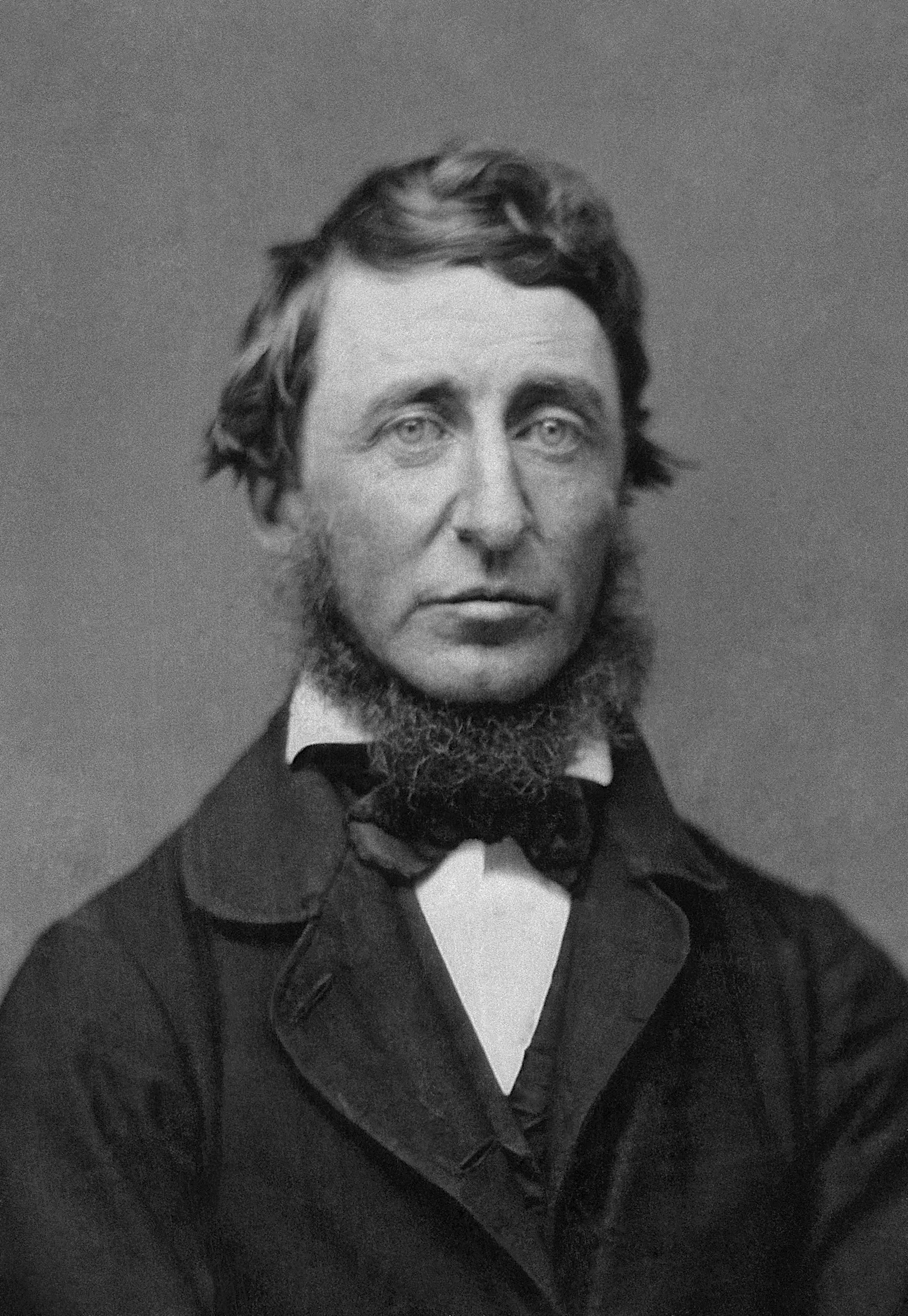
Naturalist, poet and philosopher Henry David Thoreau (AB, 1837)

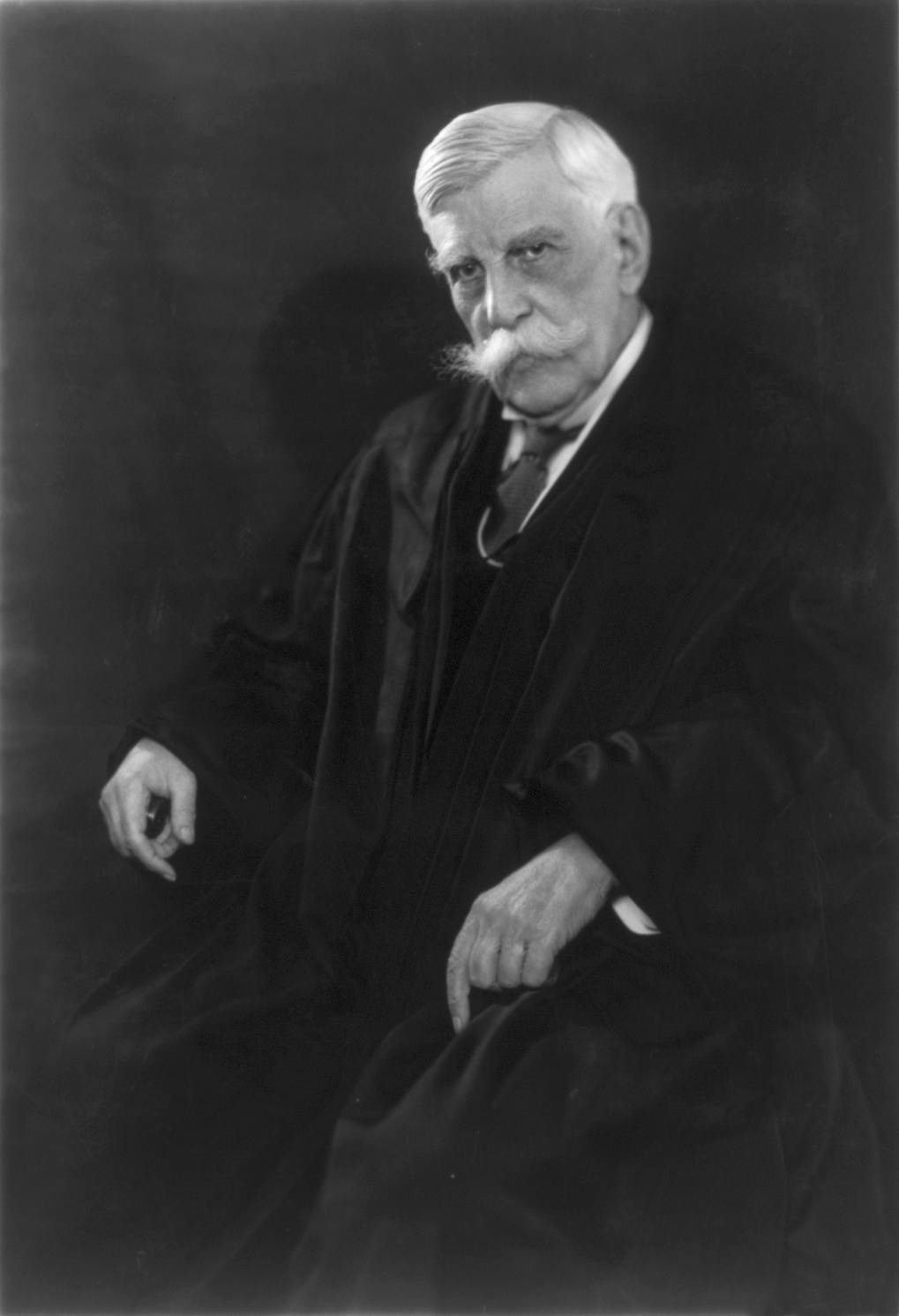
US supreme court justice Oliver Wendell Holmes Jr. (AB, 1861)

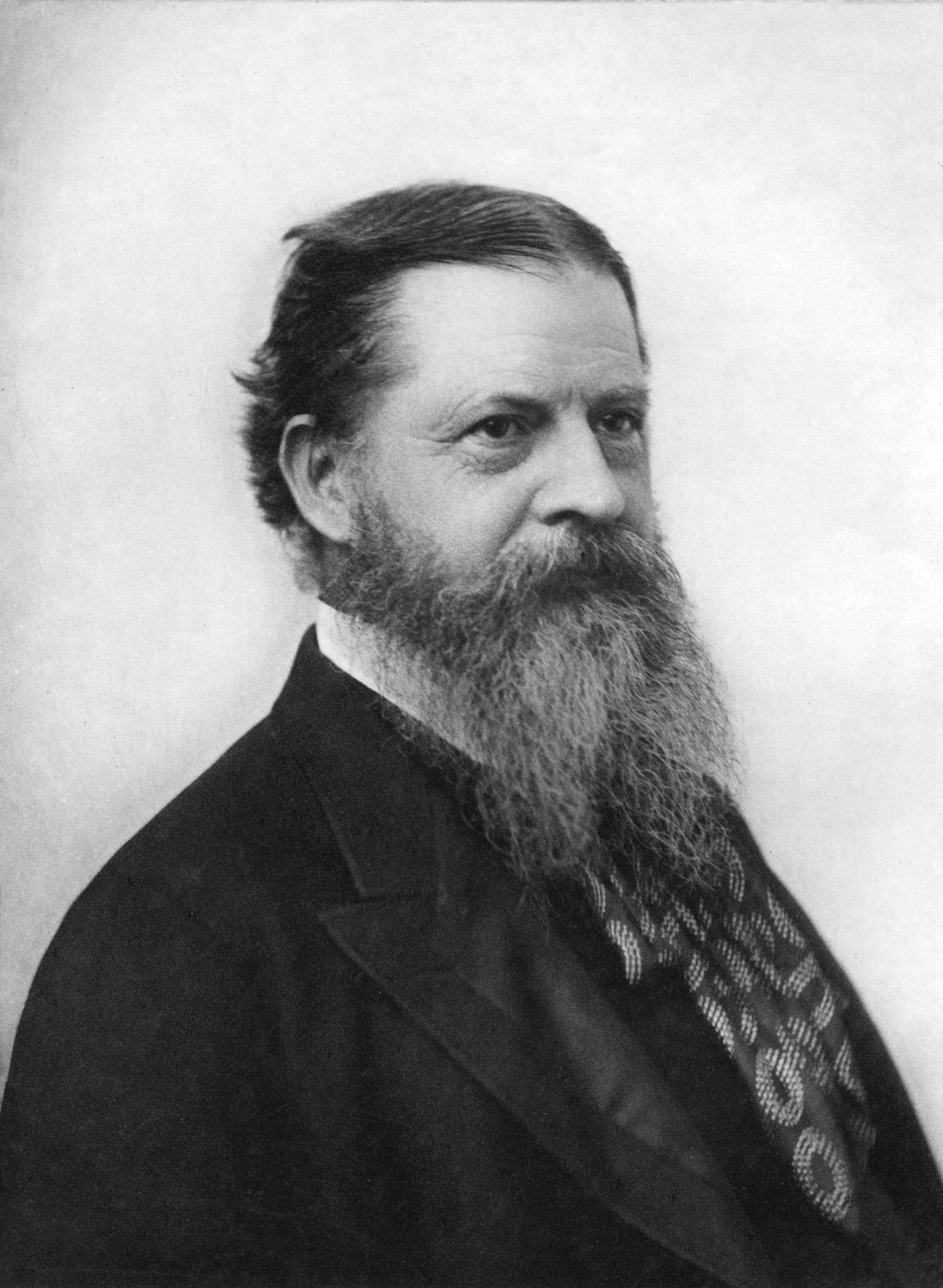
Philosopher and mathematician Charles Sanders Peirce (AB, 1862)

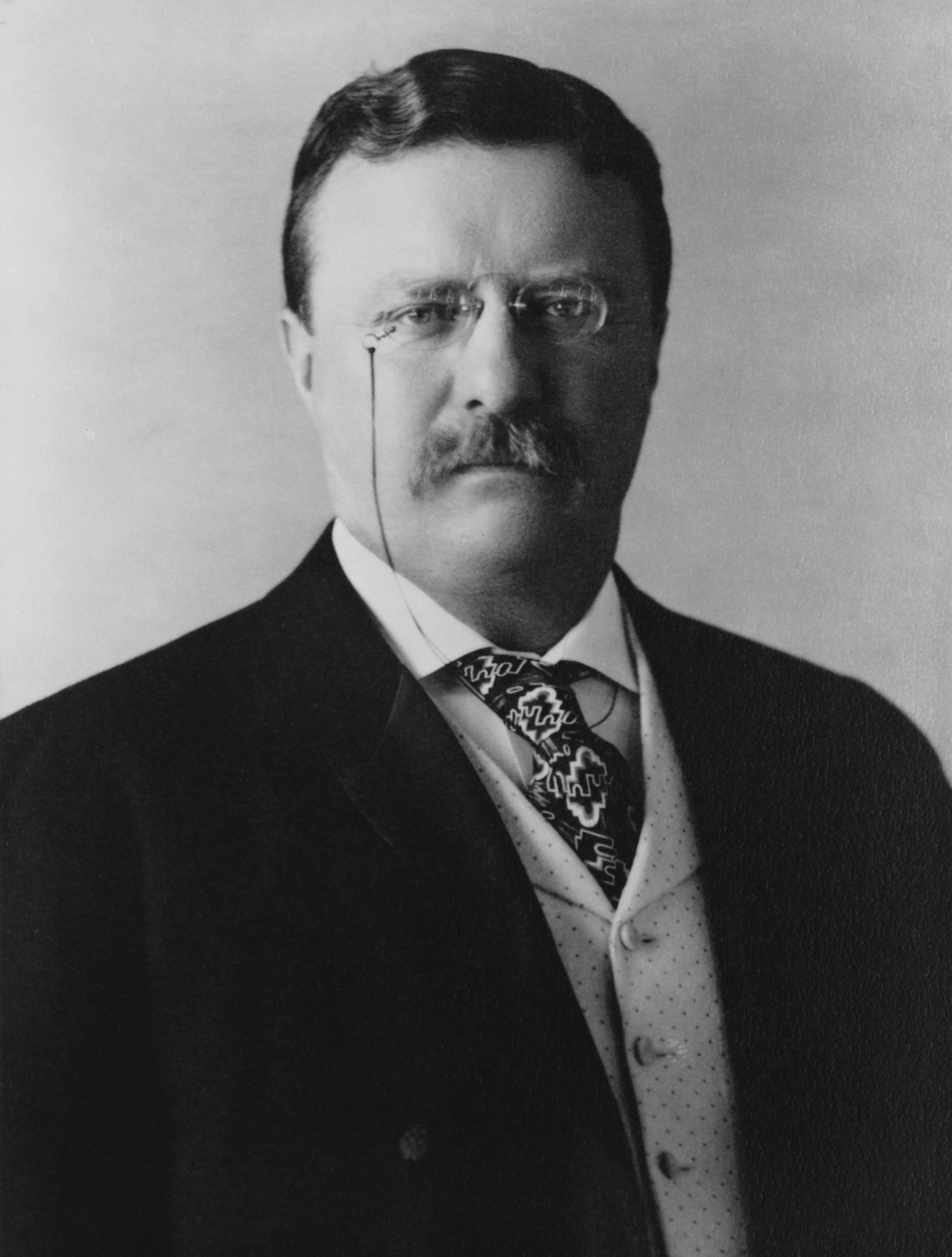
US president and Nobel laureate in peace Theodore Roosevelt (AB, 1880)

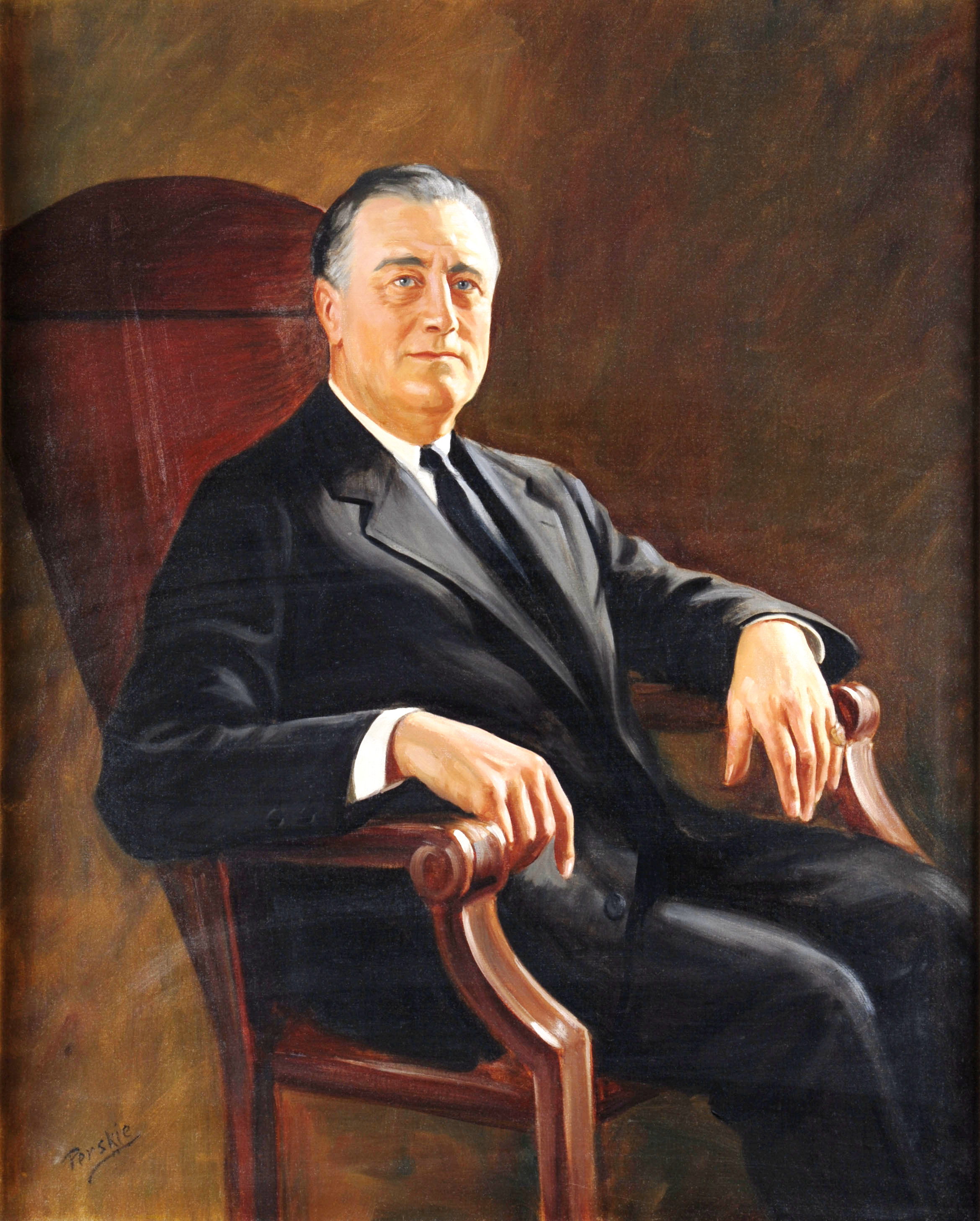
US president Franklin D. Roosevelt (AB, 1903)

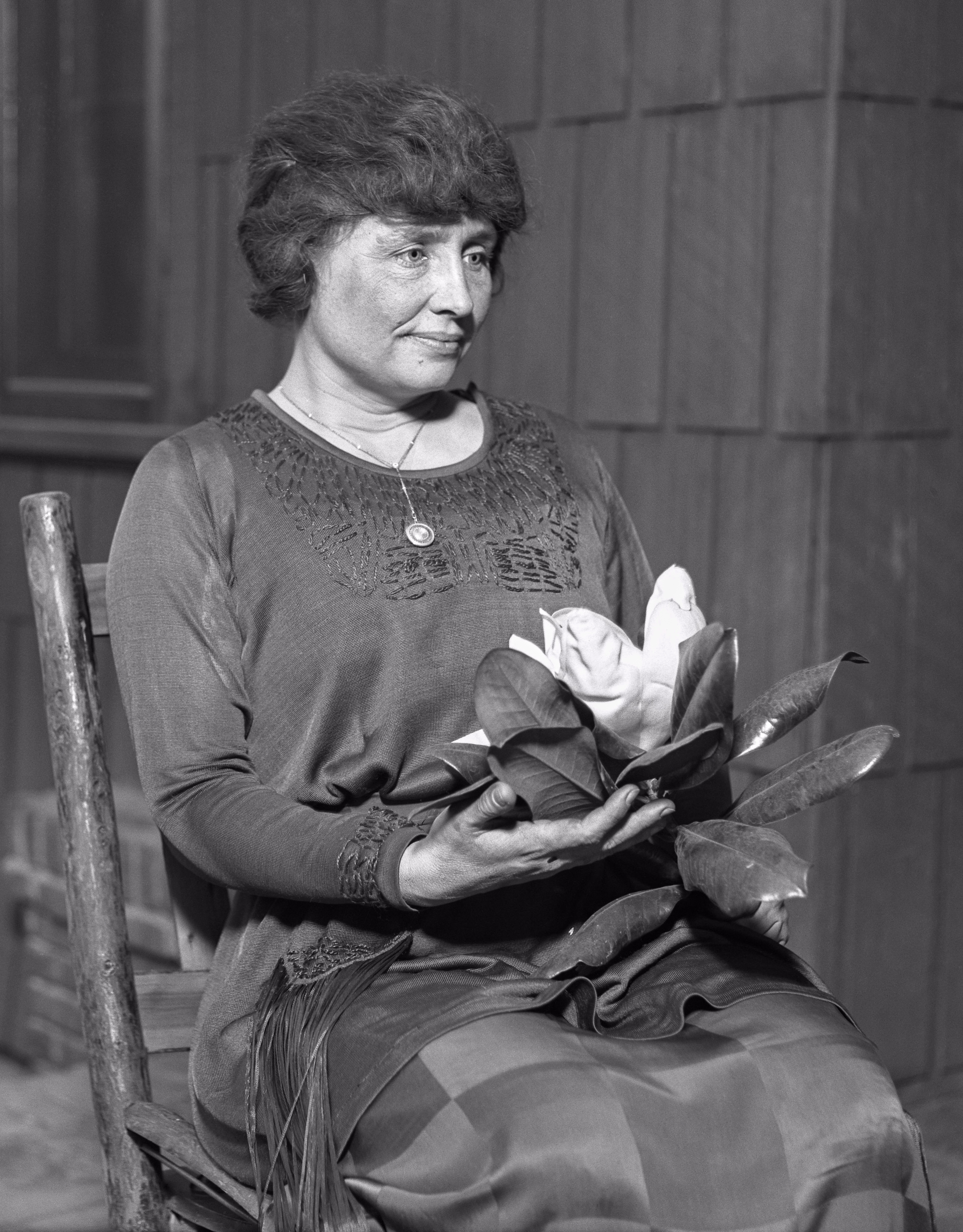
Author, political activist, and lecturer Helen Keller (AB, 1904, Radcliffe College)

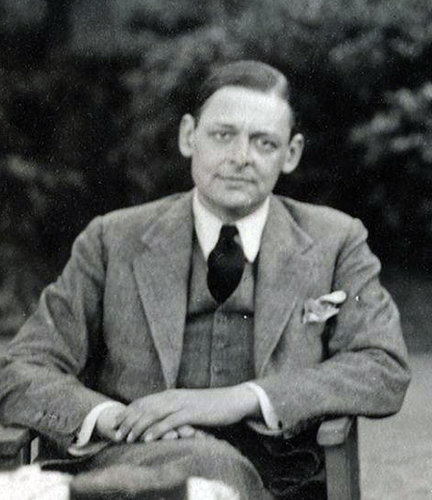
Poet and Nobel laureate in literature T. S. Eliot (AB, 1909)

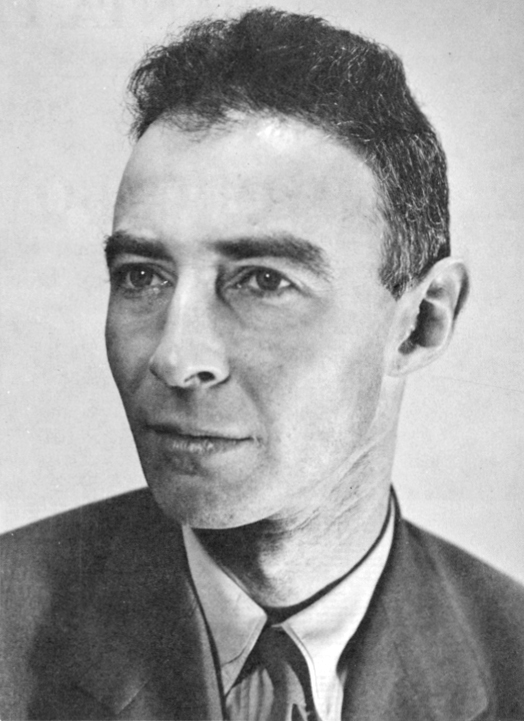
Physicist J. Robert Oppenheimer (AB, 1925)

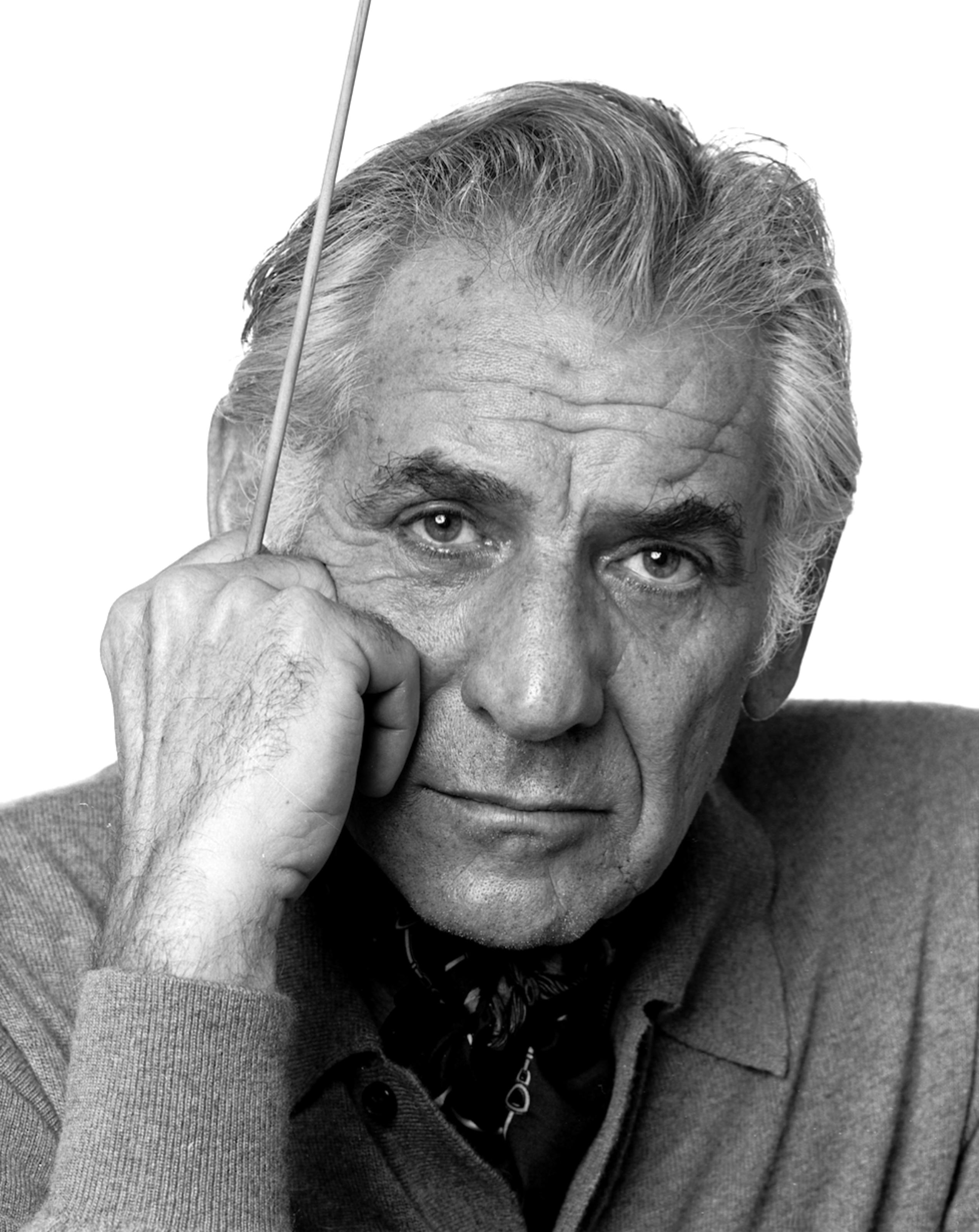
Composer Leonard Bernstein (AB, 1939)

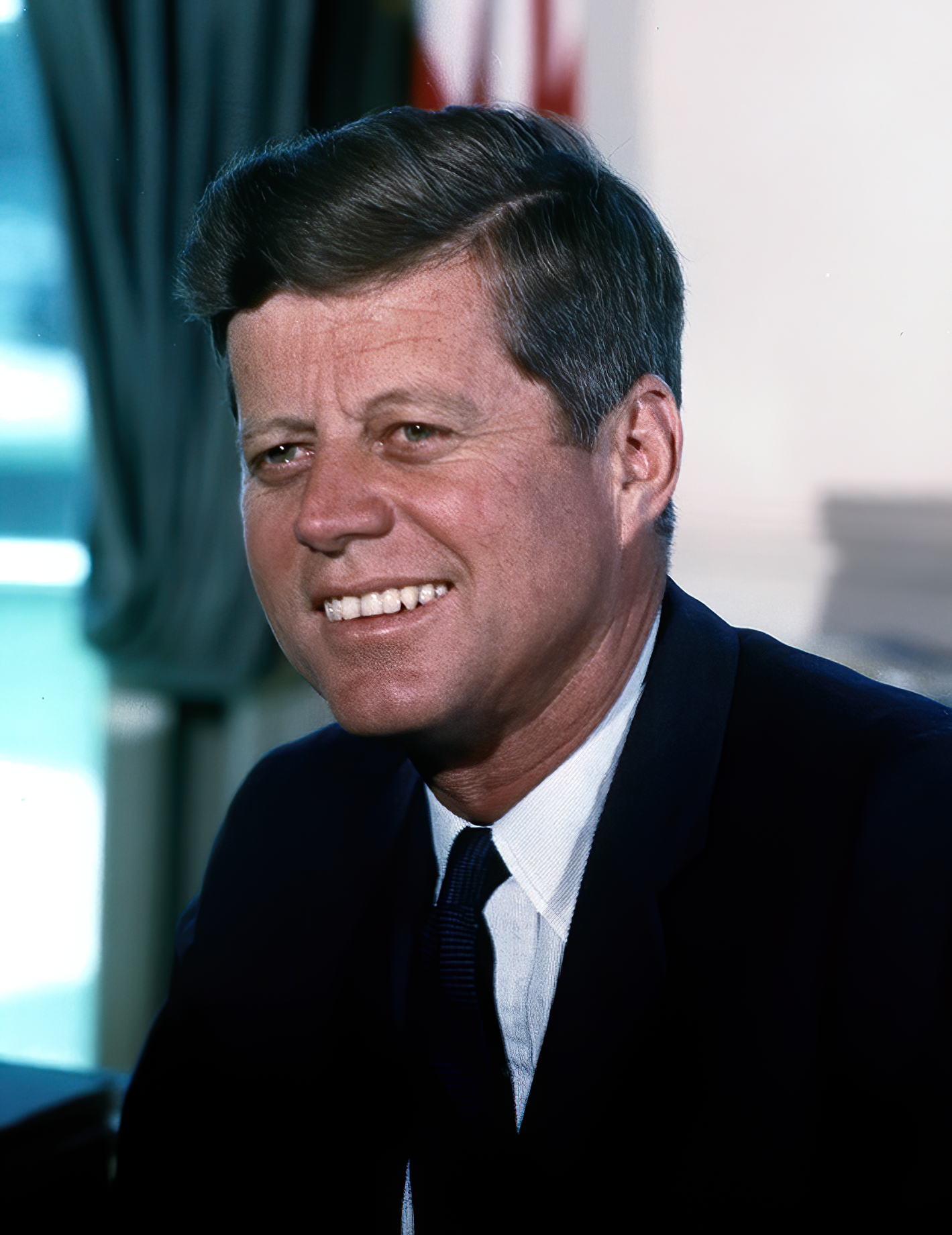
US president John F. Kennedy (AB, 1940)

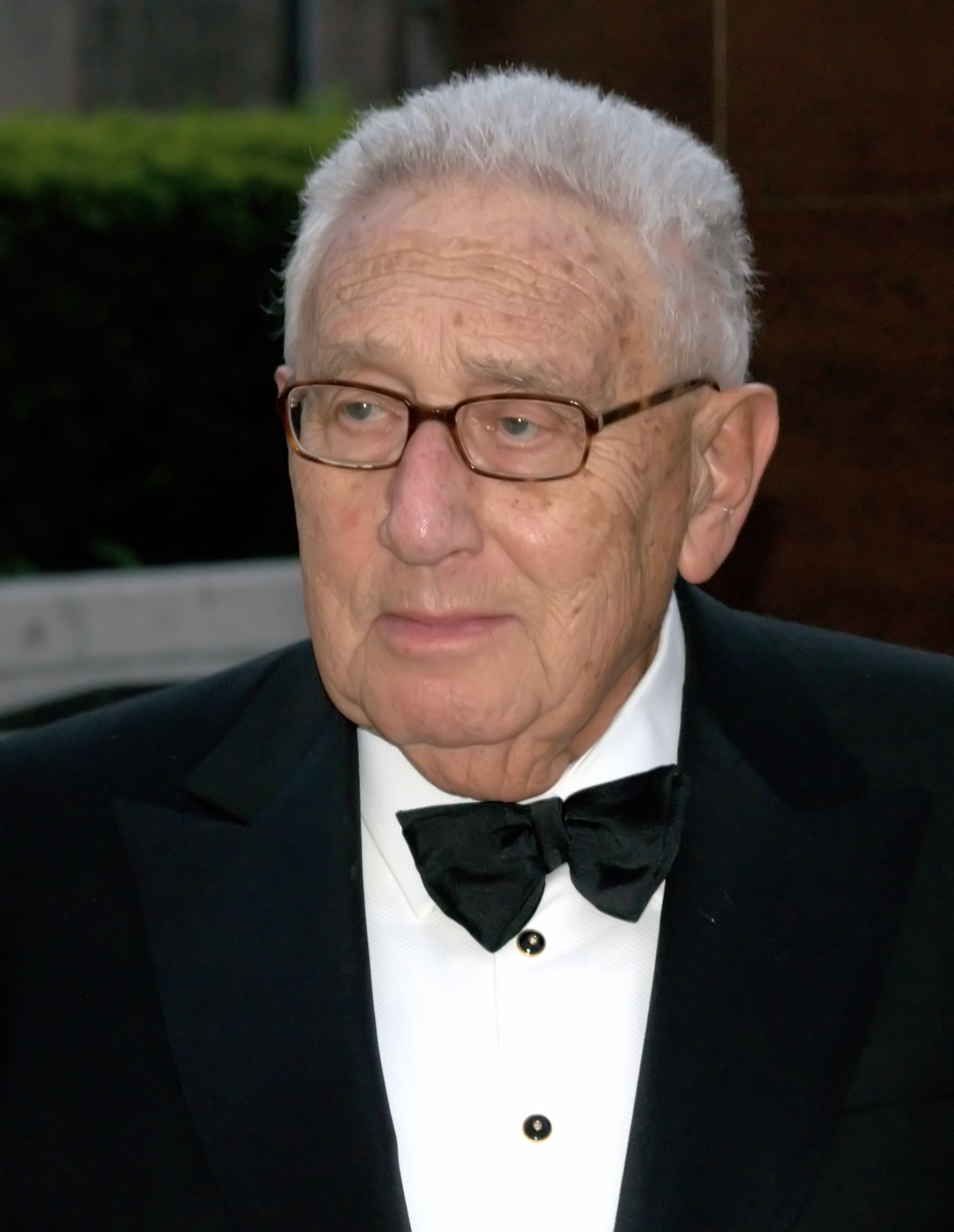
US secretary of state and Nobel laureate in peace Henry Kissinger (AB, 1950)

US vice president and Nobel laureate in peace Al Gore (AB, 1969)

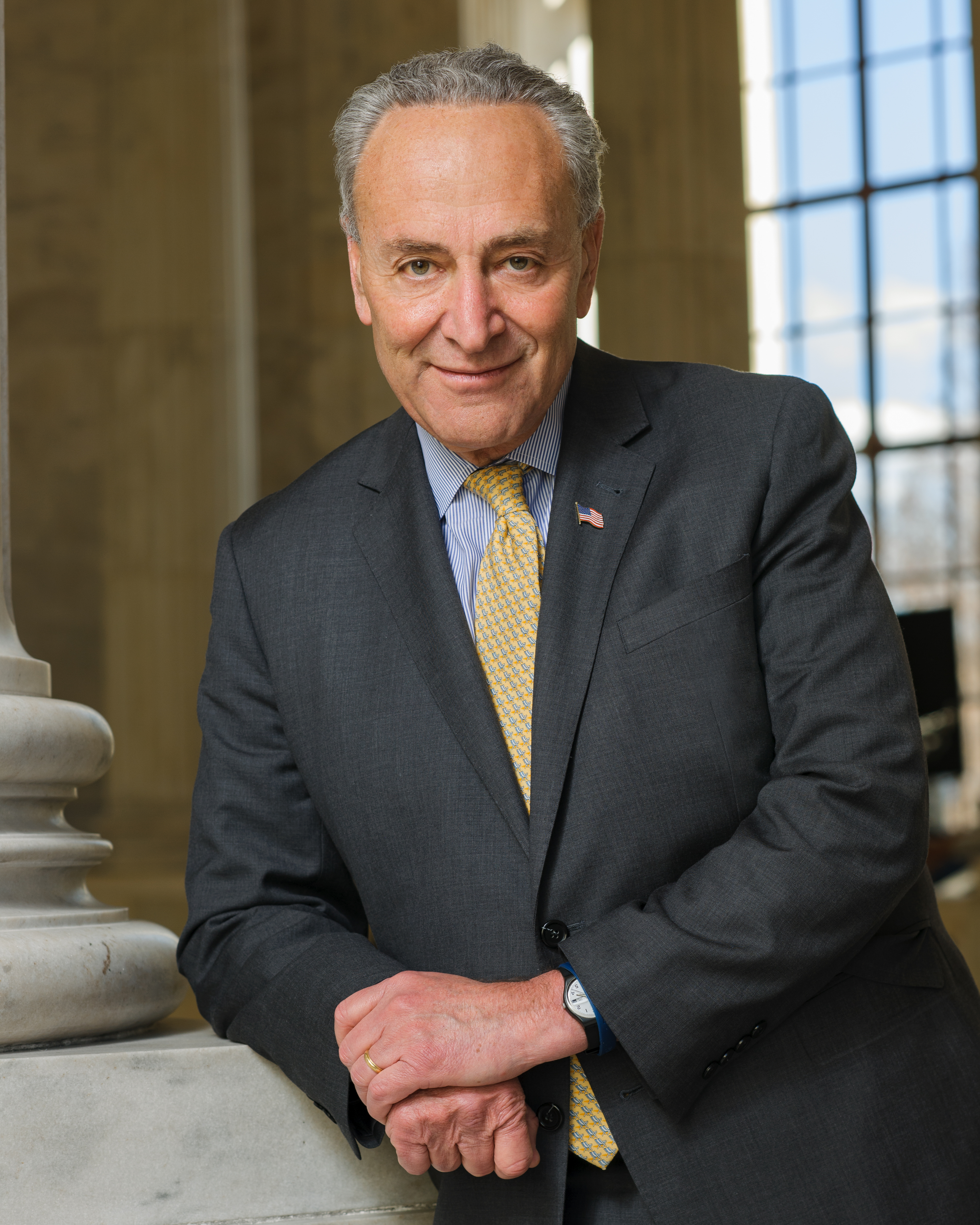
US senate majority leader Chuck Schumer (AB, 1971)

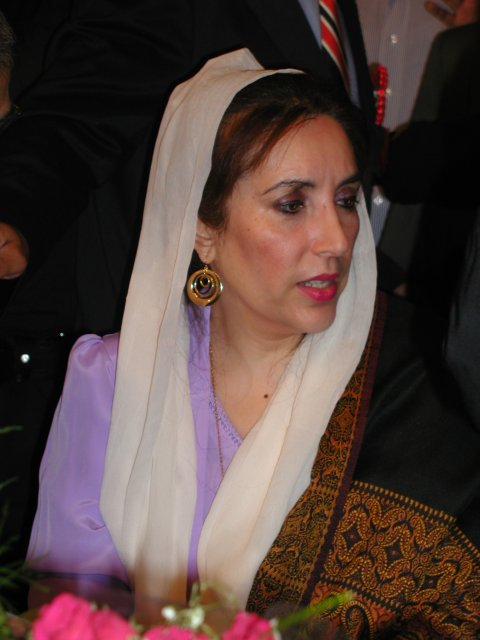
11th and 13th Prime Minister of Pakistan Benazir Bhutto (AB, 1973, Radcliffe College)

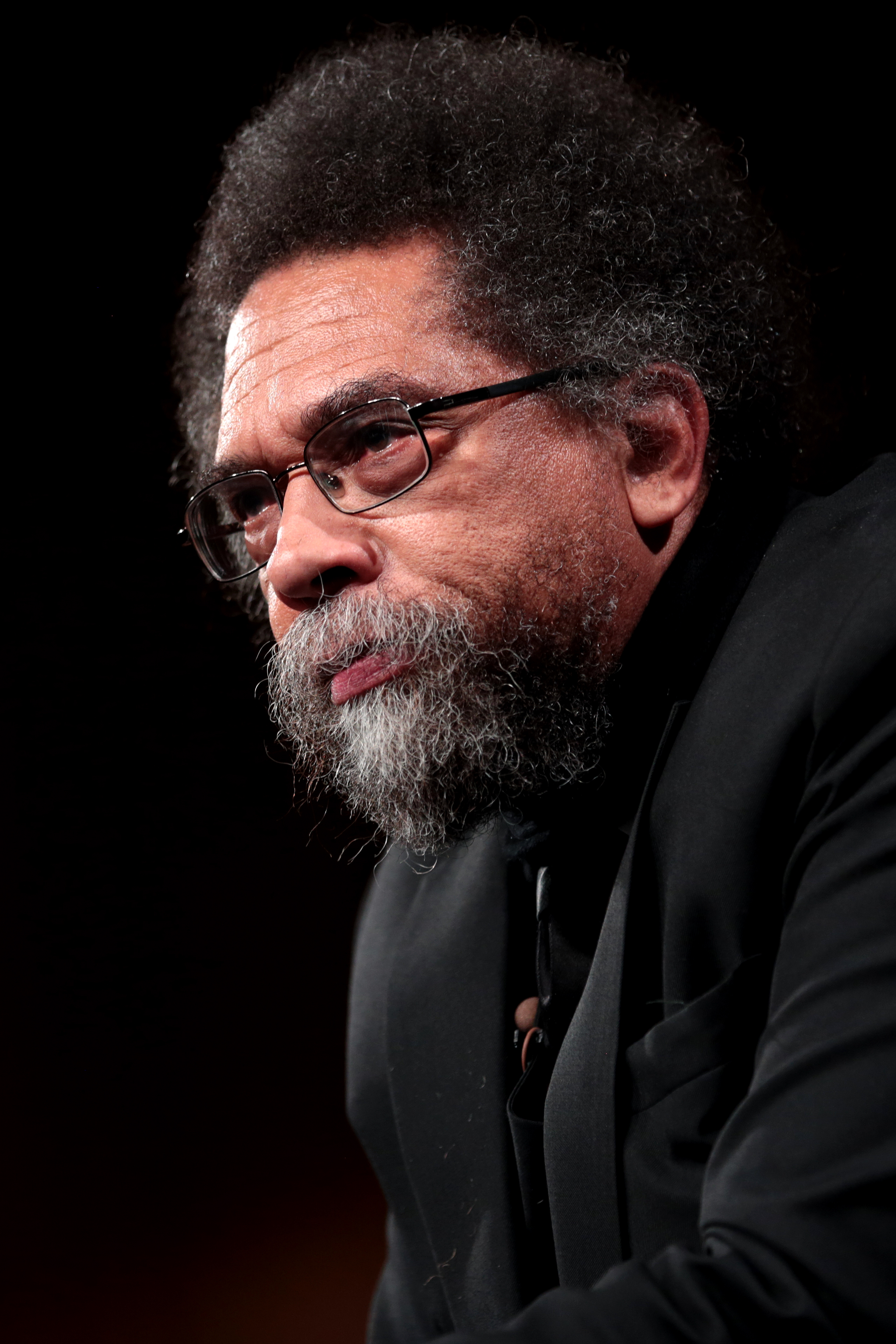
Philosopher, political activist, and social critic Cornel West (AB, 1973)

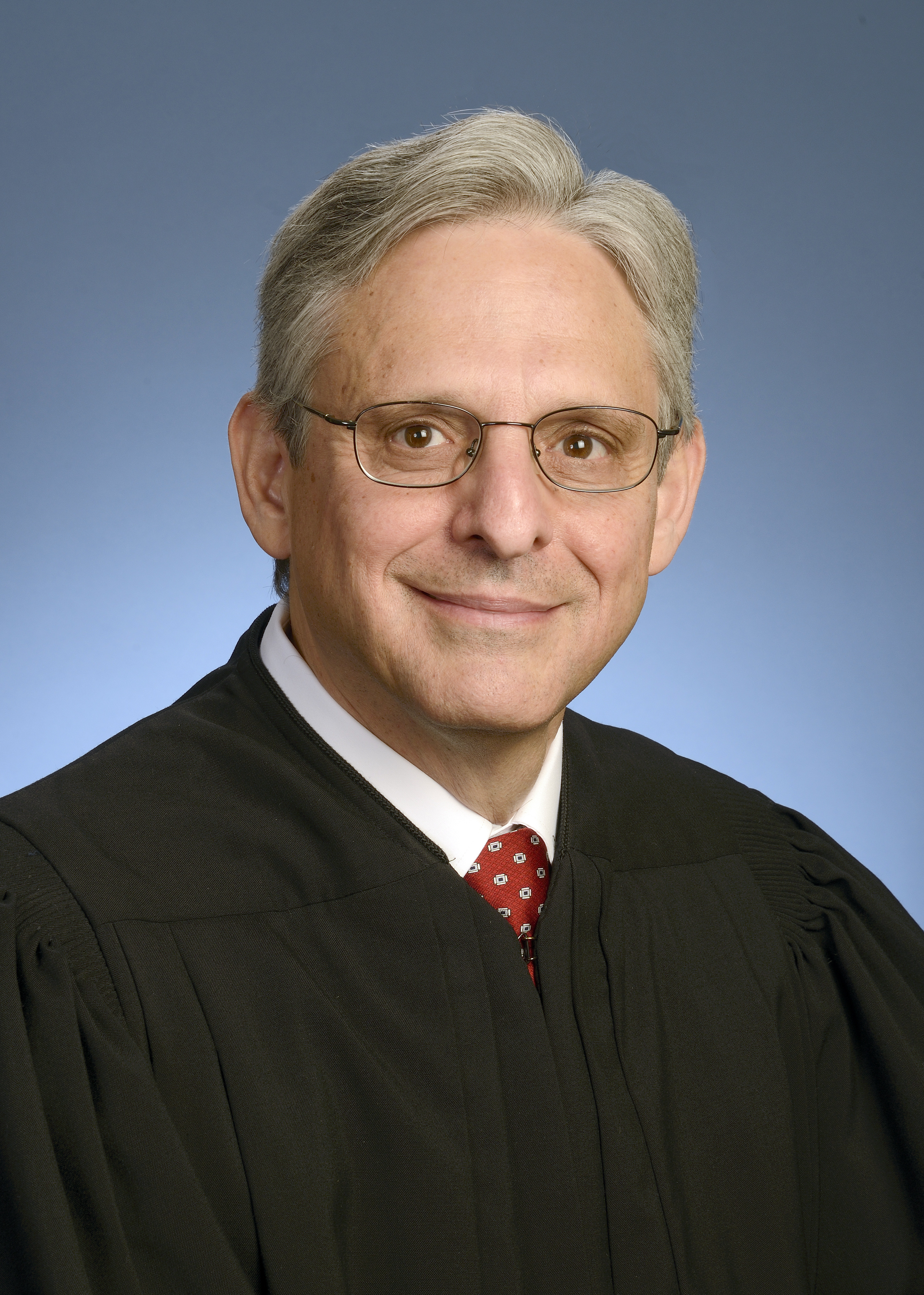
US attorney general Merrick Garland (AB, 1974)

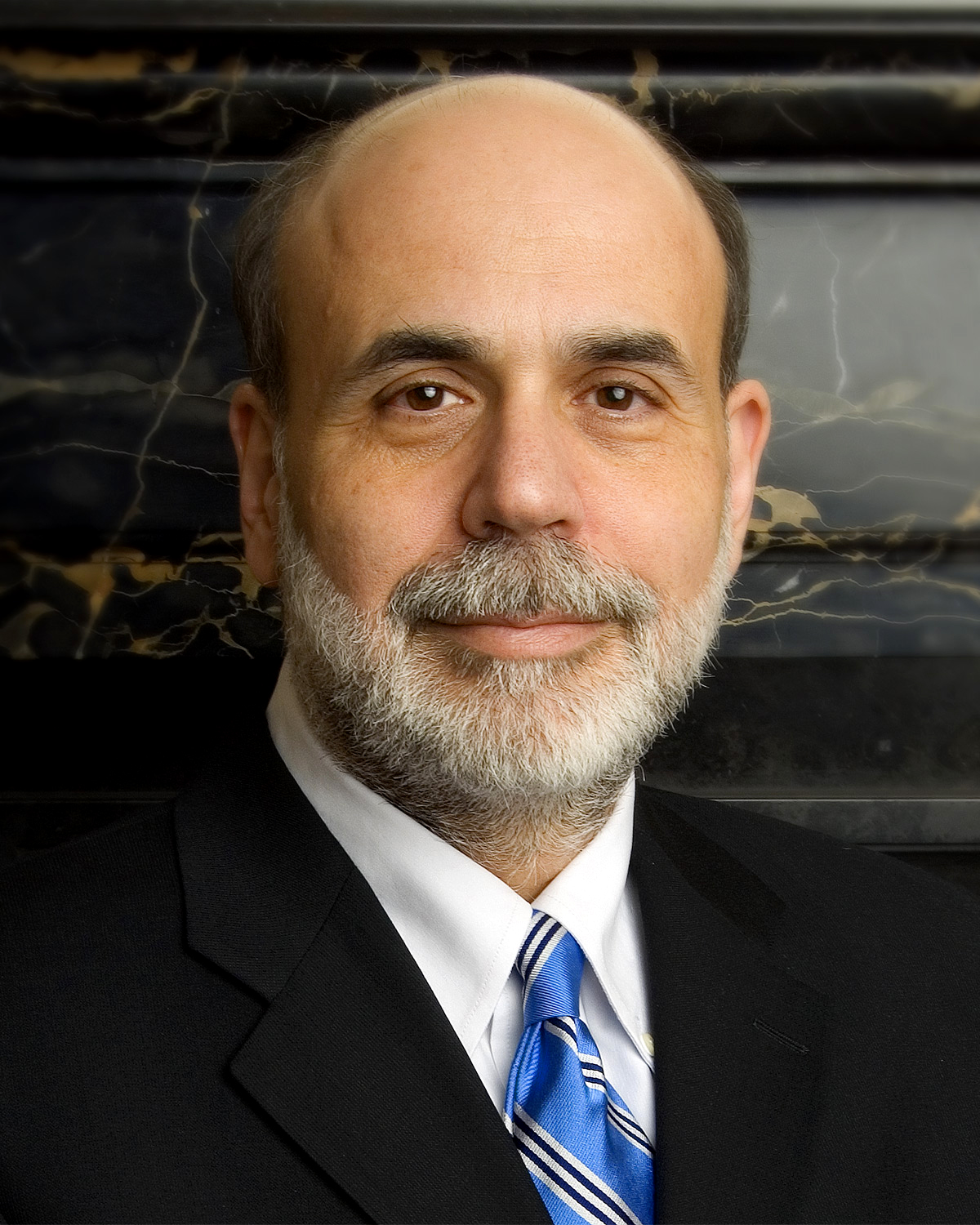
Federal Reserve chair Ben Bernanke (AB, 1975)

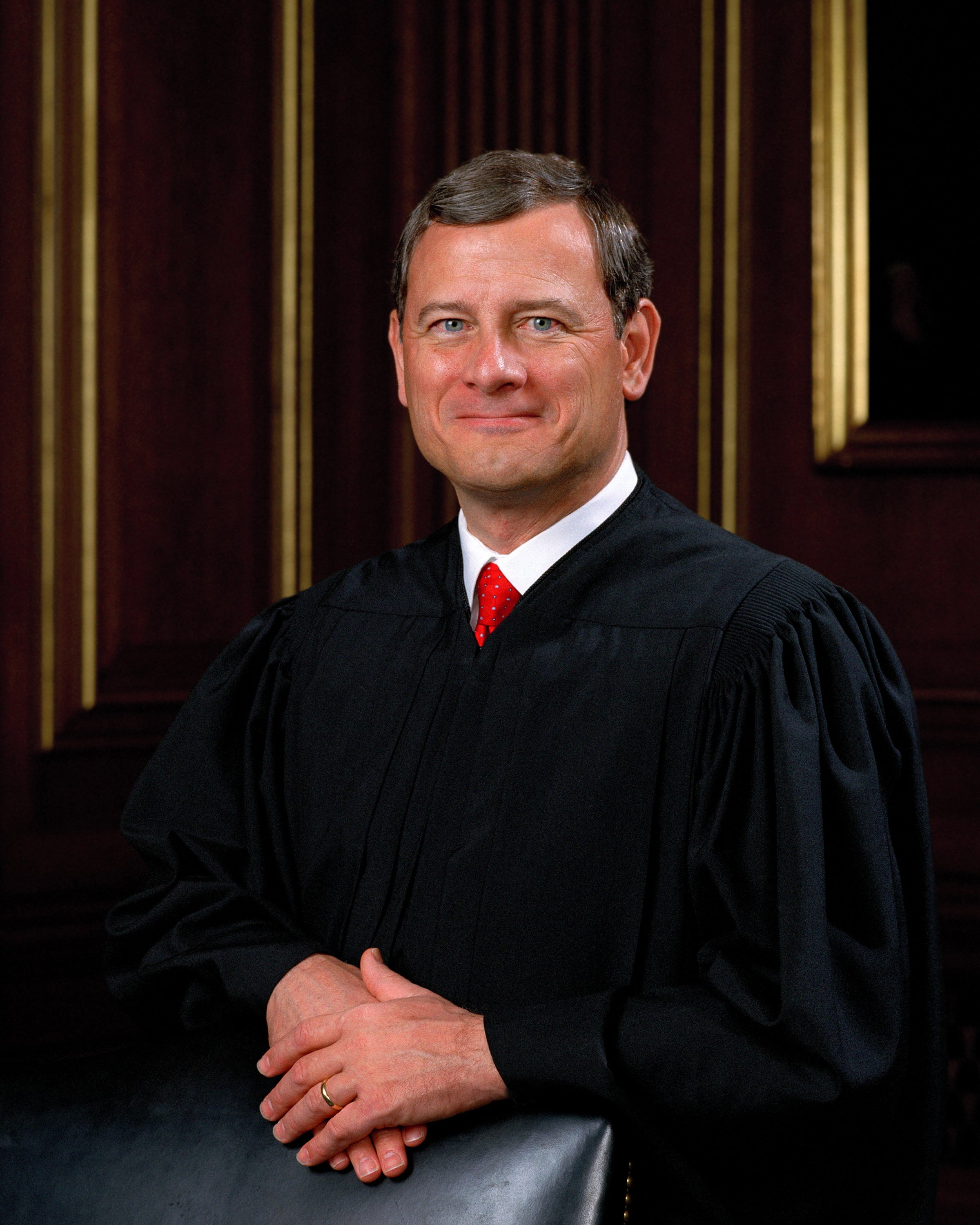
US supreme court chief justice John Roberts (AB, 1976)

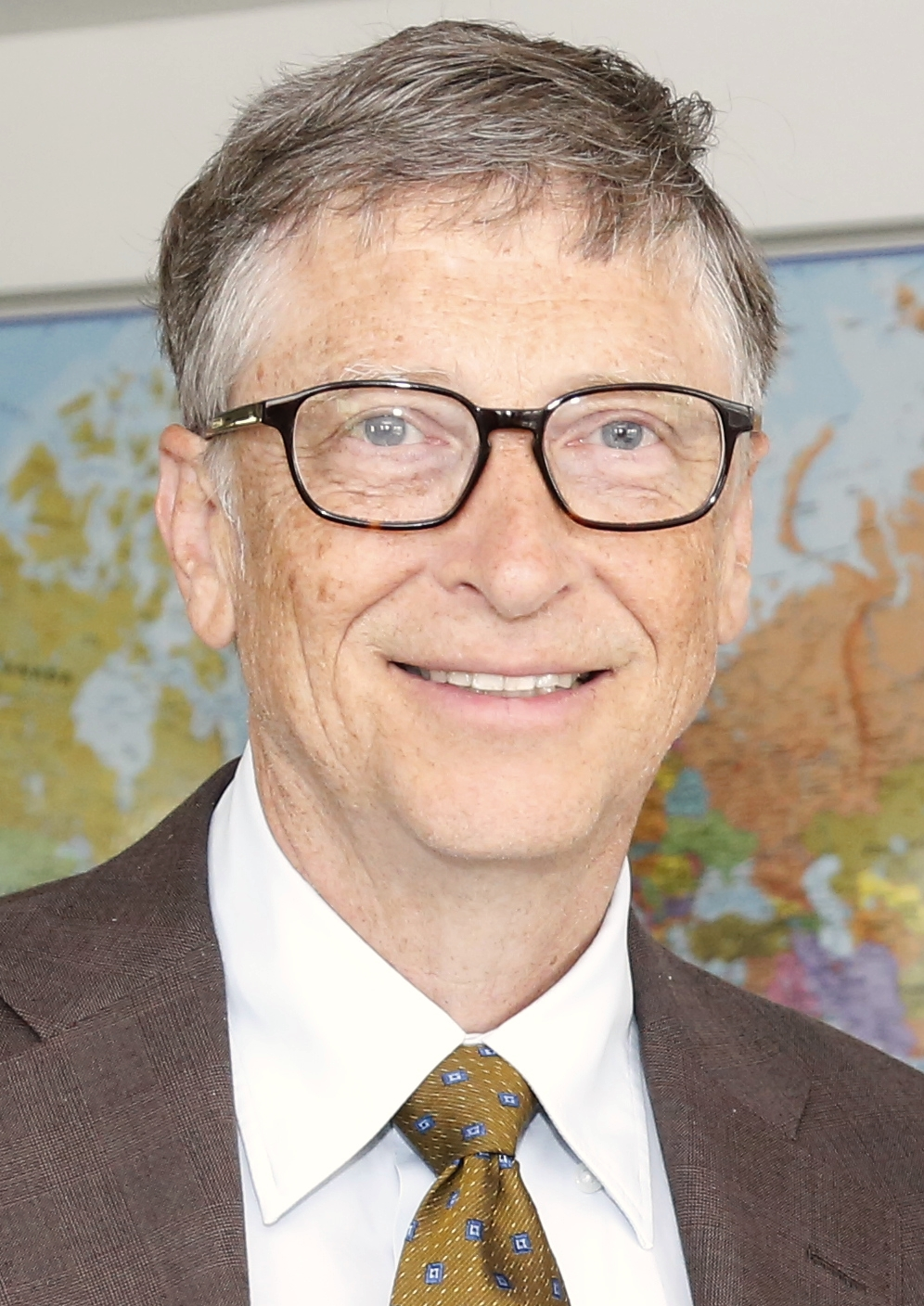
Microsoft founder Bill Gates (1977) (Note: Harvard College "social" class year: did not graduate.)

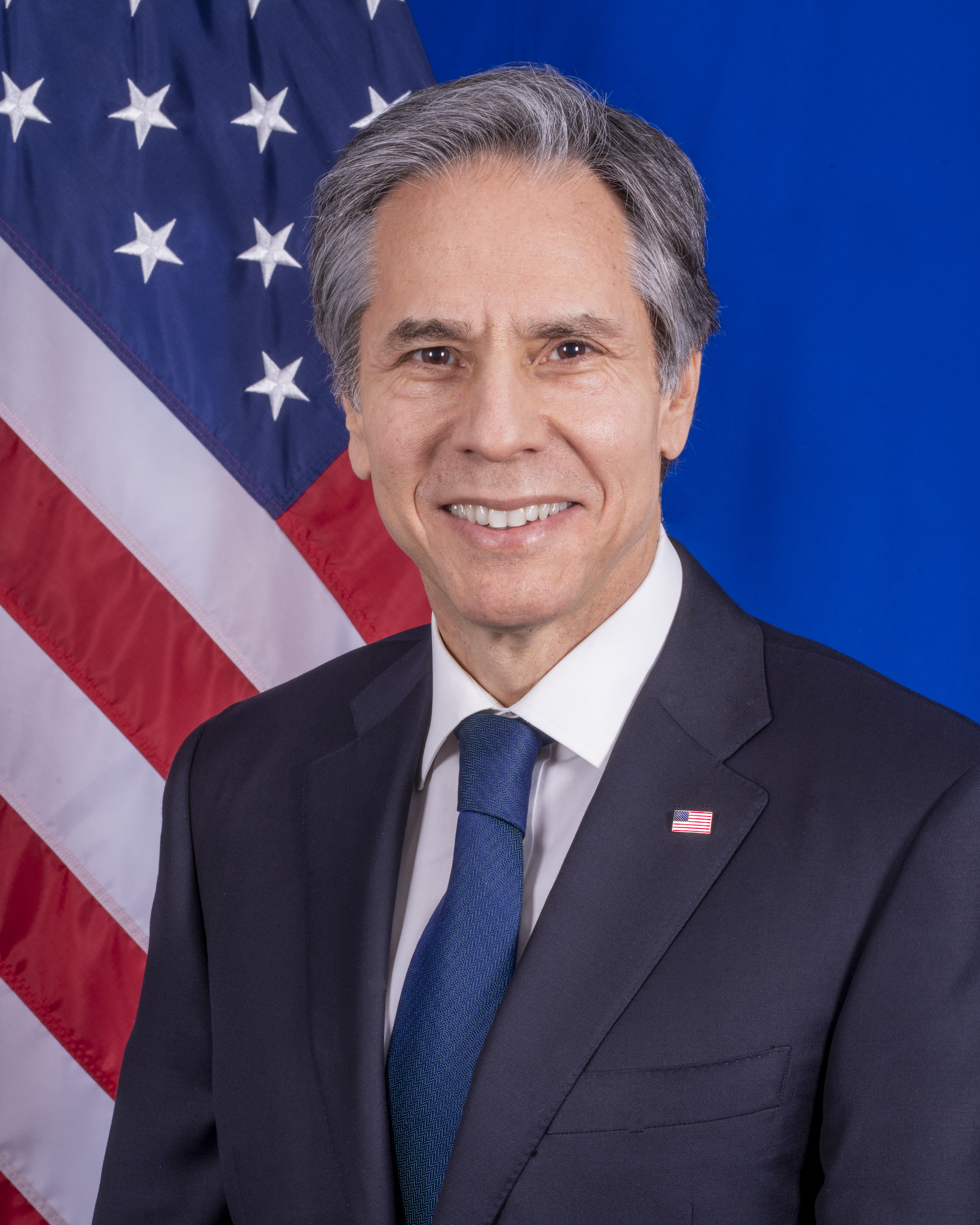
US secretary of state Antony Blinken (AB, 1984)

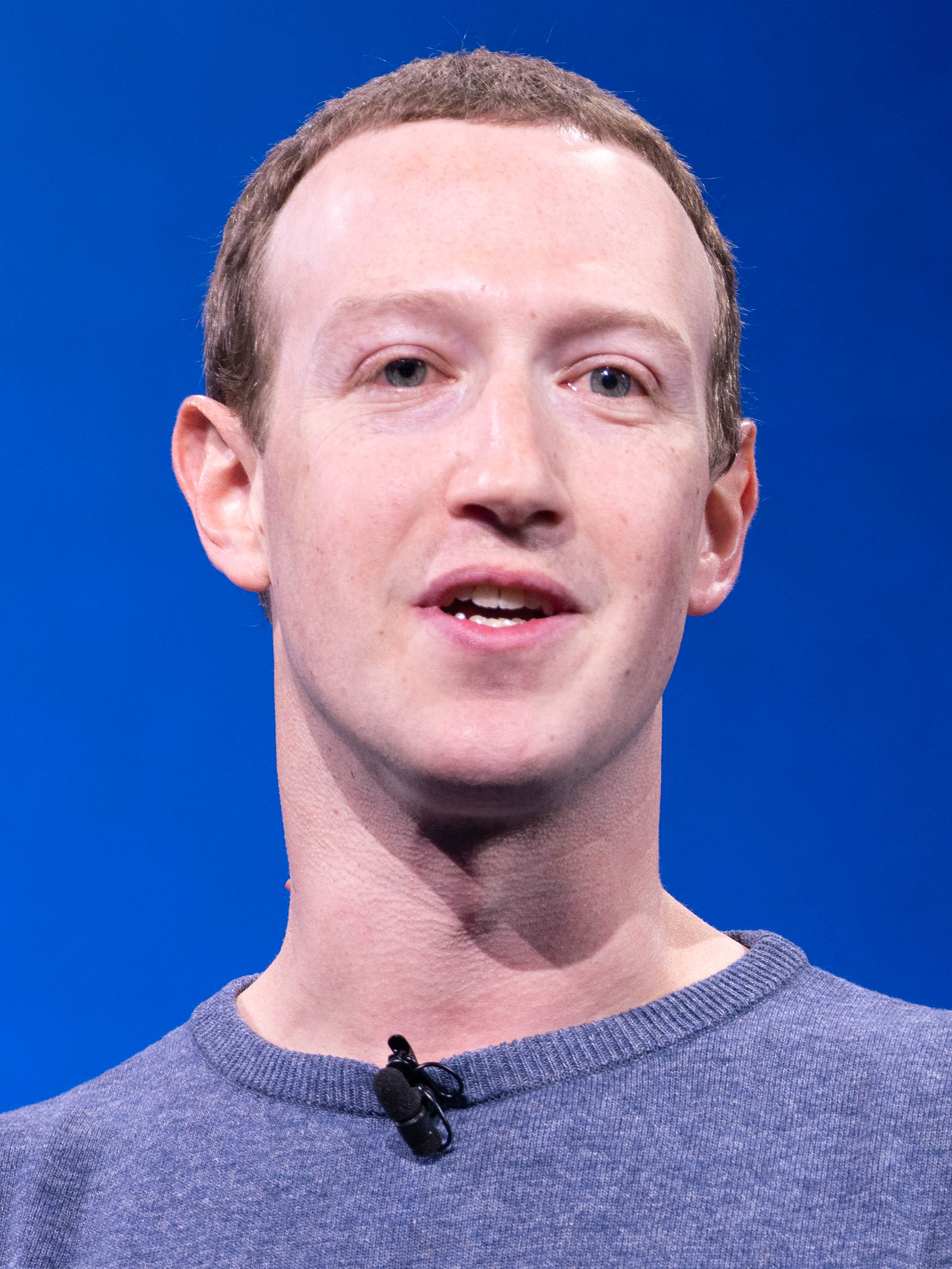
Facebook co-founder Mark Zuckerberg (2006)

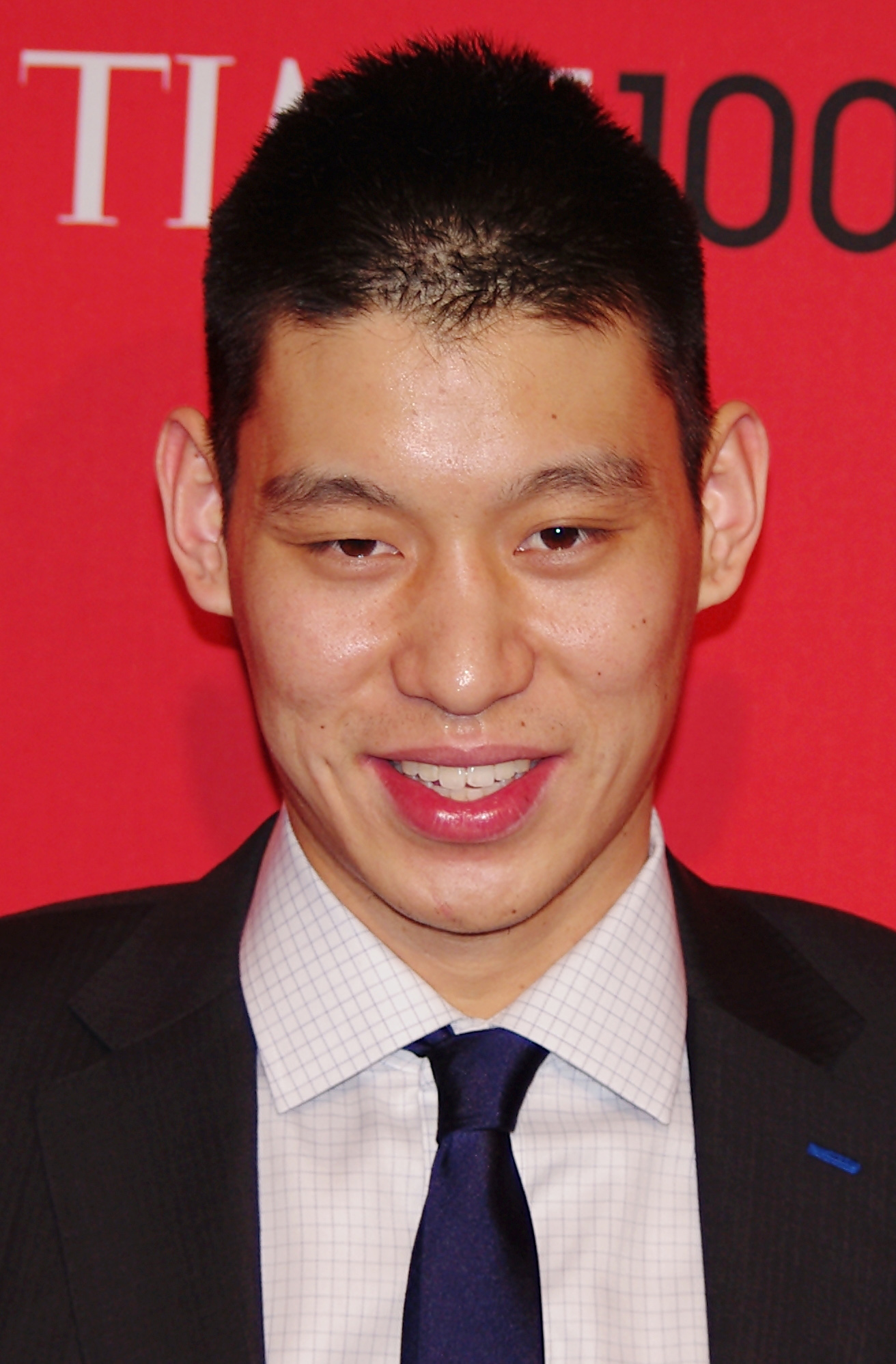
Basketball player Jeremy Lin (AB, 2010)
