= Caleb Cheeshahteaumuck =

Native American student

- Portrait by Stephen E. Coit, 2010
- Born: ~ 1644; Martha's Vineyard (Wampanoag: Noepe)
- Died: ~ 1666; Watertown, Massachusetts
- Education: Harvard College
- Occupation: Student
- Known for: Being the first Native American to graduate from Harvard

Caleb Cheeshahteaumuck (estimated 1644 – 1666) was the first Native American to graduate from Harvard University.

== Life ==
Cheeshahteaumuck, the son of a Nobnocket (West Chop) sachem, was born into the Wampanoag tribe on Martha's Vineyard, where he received a formal education. He and his classmate Joel Hiacoomes were taught on the Vineyard by Peter Folger, the maternal grandfather to Benjamin Franklin.

The two went on to attend Elijah Corlet's grammar school in Cambridge in around 1657.

== Harvard and death ==
Cheeshahteaumuck and Hiacoomes both entered Harvard's Indian College in 1661. Hiacoomes died in a shipwreck a few months prior to graduation while returning to Harvard from Martha's Vineyard. Cheeshahteaumuck became the first Native American to graduate from Harvard in 1665. He died of tuberculosis in Watertown, Massachusetts less than a year after graduation.

One document remains from Cheeshahteaumuck's time at Harvard which he purportedly wrote, written entirely in Latin. This short letter, addressed to "most honored benefactors," contains references to Greek mythology, Greco-Roman philosophers, and Puritan theology. The letter was meant to thank donors and encourage them to continue their financial support. Some consider this to be the earliest extant writing by a Native American on the North American continent.

In 1674, Daniel Gookin, writing about American Indians in New England, described Cheeshahteaumuck's death and how "Caleb, not long after he took his degree of bachelor of art at Cambridge in New England, died of a consumption at Charlestown, where he was placed by Thomas Danforth, who had inspection over him, under the care of a physician in order to his health; where he wanted not for the best means the country could afford, both of food and physic; but God denied the blessing, and put a period to his days."

The Harvard Foundation unveiled a portrait of Cheeshahteaumuck on December 16, 2010, in the Annenberg Hall, painted by Stephen E. Coit.

== Legacy ==
Cheeshahteaumuck is the title character in Geraldine Brooks' book of historical fiction Caleb's Crossing.
