= Joel Hiacoomes =

Native American student

- Born: c. 1644; Martha's Vineyard (Wampanoag: Noepe)
- Disappeared: Coastal waters off Nantucket, Massachusetts, U.S.
- Died: 1665 (aged about 21)
- Other names: Joel Jacoomis, Joell Jacoomis, Joel Iacoomes, Joel Hiacoomb, Joel Iacoombs, J:acoomis, Jacoomis
- Education: Harvard University
- Occupation: Student
- Known for: Attending Harvard
- Father: Hiacoomes

Signature
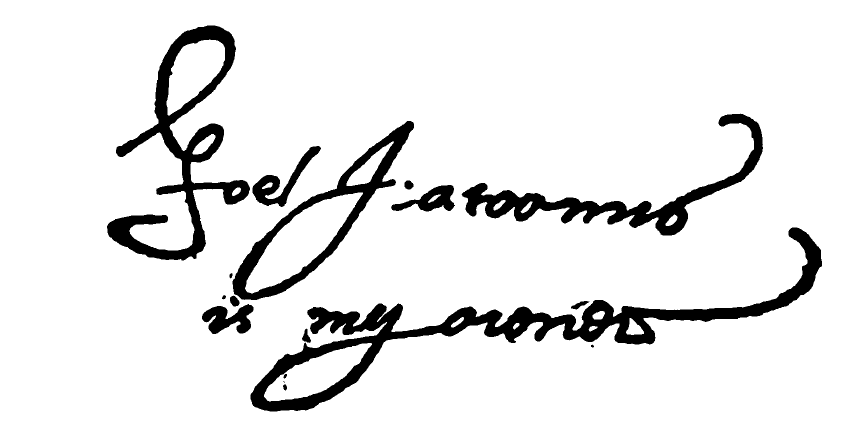

Joel Hiacoomes (c. 1644–1665) was a Wampanoag interpreter and one of the first Native American students at Harvard University.

== Life ==
Joel Hiacoomes, son of Hiacoomes, the Wampanoag interpreter for missionary Thomas Mayhew, was born into the Wampanoag Tribe on Martha's Vineyard, traditionally Noepe. Joel and his classmate Caleb Cheeshahteaumuck, also a Wampanoag, were taught on the Vineyard by Peter Folger, the maternal grandfather to Benjamin Franklin. The two went on to attend Elijah Corlett's grammar school in Cambridge in around 1657. In 1661 they both entered Harvard's Indian College. Joel Hiacoomes and Caleb Cheeshahteaumuck were both set to graduate from Harvard in 1665; however, only Caleb received his degree.

== Harvard and death ==
Joel Hiacoomes was set to be named Harvard valedictorian, but died before graduation in a shipwreck, after robbers pounced on the shipwreck survivors. The boat Joel sailed on was found wrecked on the shores of Nantucket Island.

== Legacy ==
In the time that Joel attended Harvard, two weeks of oral exams in Greek and Latin were a requirement for graduation, in addition to attending the commencement ceremony. Therefore, due to his untimely death, Joel never received his Harvard diploma. Harvard rectified this in 2011 when, almost 350 years after Joel Hiacoomes was scheduled to graduate, Harvard University presented members of the Wampanoag community with a special posthumous degree for him alongside Tiffany Smalley, the first Wampanoag to graduate from Harvard College since Caleb.

In response to the posthumous ceremony in 2011, Cheryl Andrews-Maltais, the chairwoman of the Wampanoag Tribe of Gay Head (Aquinnah), said:

"We are delighted that this posthumous degree is being awarded to our own Joel Iacoomes since he was from our island community, it means a great deal to us to see his extraordinary achievement recognized alongside his fellow tribe member, Caleb Cheeshahteaumuck, the first Indian to graduate from Harvard."

While at Harvard, Joel used John Amos Comenius's Janua Linguarum Reserata as a textbook. The Harvard College Library copy of the first edition of the Janua Linguarum has Joel's signature twice as a borrower.

In 1674, Daniel Gookin, writing about American Indians in New England, described Joel and Caleb Cheeshahteaumuck as "hopeful young men, especially Joel, being so ripe in learning, that he should, within a few months, have taken his first degree of bachelor of art in the college." Gookin, further elaborating, explained how Joel "was a good scholar and a pious man, as I judge. I knew him well; for he lived and was taught in the same town where I dwell. I observed him for several years, after he was grown to years of discretion, to be not only a diligent student, but an attentive hearer of God’s word; diligently writing the sermons, and frequenting lectures; grave and sober in his conversation."

Hiacoomes and Cheeshahteaumuck are portrayed in Geraldine Brooks' book of historical fiction Caleb's Crossing.

Alternative spellings of Joel's last name are: Jacoomis, Iacoomes, Iacoombs, J:acoomis, and Jacoomis.
