= Harvard Indian College =

Educational institution in Cambridge, Massachusetts Bay Colony

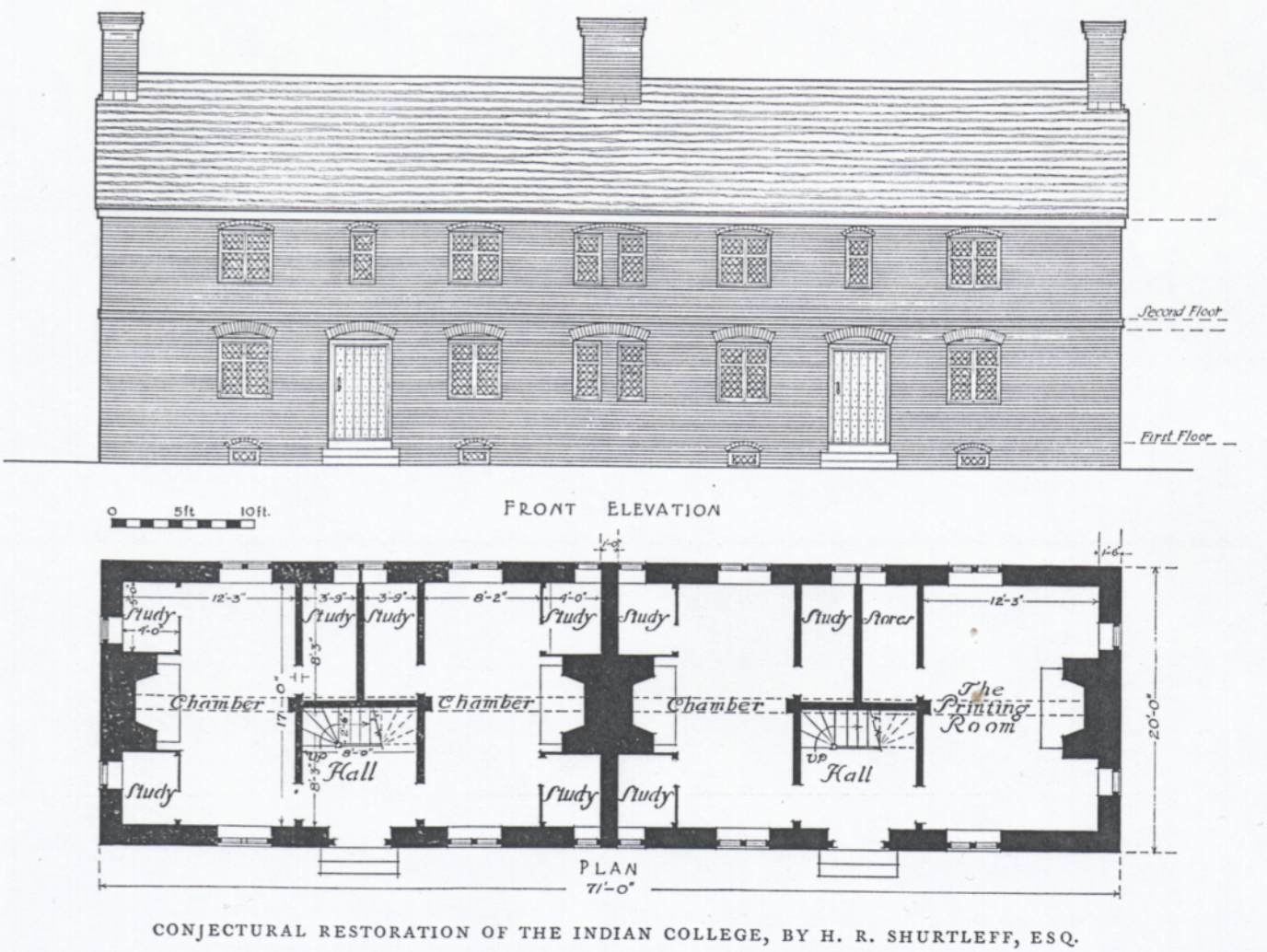
An illustration of Indian College at Harvard College drawn by Harold Shurtleff

The Indian College (1640s-1693) was an institution of higher education established in the 1640s with the mission of training Native American students at Harvard College, in the town of Cambridge, in colonial Massachusetts. The Indian College's building, located in Harvard Yard, was completed in 1656. It housed a printing press used to publish the first Christian Bible translated into a Native American language, the Eliot Indian Bible of 1663, which was also the first Bible in any language printed in British America.

The Indian College was supported financially by the Society for the Propagation of the Gospel in New England, a Christian missionary charity based in London and whose president was the scientist Robert Boyle. Harvard promised to waive tuition as well as provide housing for American Indian Students. The Indian College attracted only a handful of Native American students and was closed in 1693. Following its closure, the building was demolished, and its bricks were repurposed for the construction of Stoughton Hall, a dormitory built in 1698 within Harvard Yard. Stoughton Hall stood for nearly a century before it too was demolished in 1781. Nonetheless, some Native American students continued to attend Harvard.

In 1997, the Harvard University Native American Program (HUNAP) held a Harvard Yard at Matthews Hall ceremony where a plaque was dedicated to recognize the location of the historic Indian College. In addition to celebrating the significance of the Indian College within its historical past, more than 300 individuals attended the event to honor the legacy of the Indigenous students who attended. In 2009, remnants of the original Indian College were discovered during an archaeological dig in Harvard Yard and parts of the original printing press were recovered. At Harvard's Peabody Museum of Archaeology and Ethnology, an exhibit titled "Digging Veritas" now showcases the archaeology and history of the Indian College and student life in colonial Harvard.

== History ==
=== Origins ===
In the 1640s, in the midst of a crisis connected to the English Civil War, the leaders of Harvard College began seeking financial support to educate and convert the local Native Americans. The university was committed to "the education of English and Indian youth" in the new Harvard Charter of 1650, which still governs the institution today. The establishment of the Indian College was based on this official pledge. Harvard obtained funds from the Society for the Propagation of the Gospel in New England (SPGNE), which agreed to pay for a new two-story brick building, the first of its kind erected on Harvard Yard. This building, the Indian College, was completed in 1656. The building was large enough to accommodate about twenty students. However, at the time of completion no Native American students attended the college, and the building was used to accommodate colonial English students instead.

=== Printing press ===
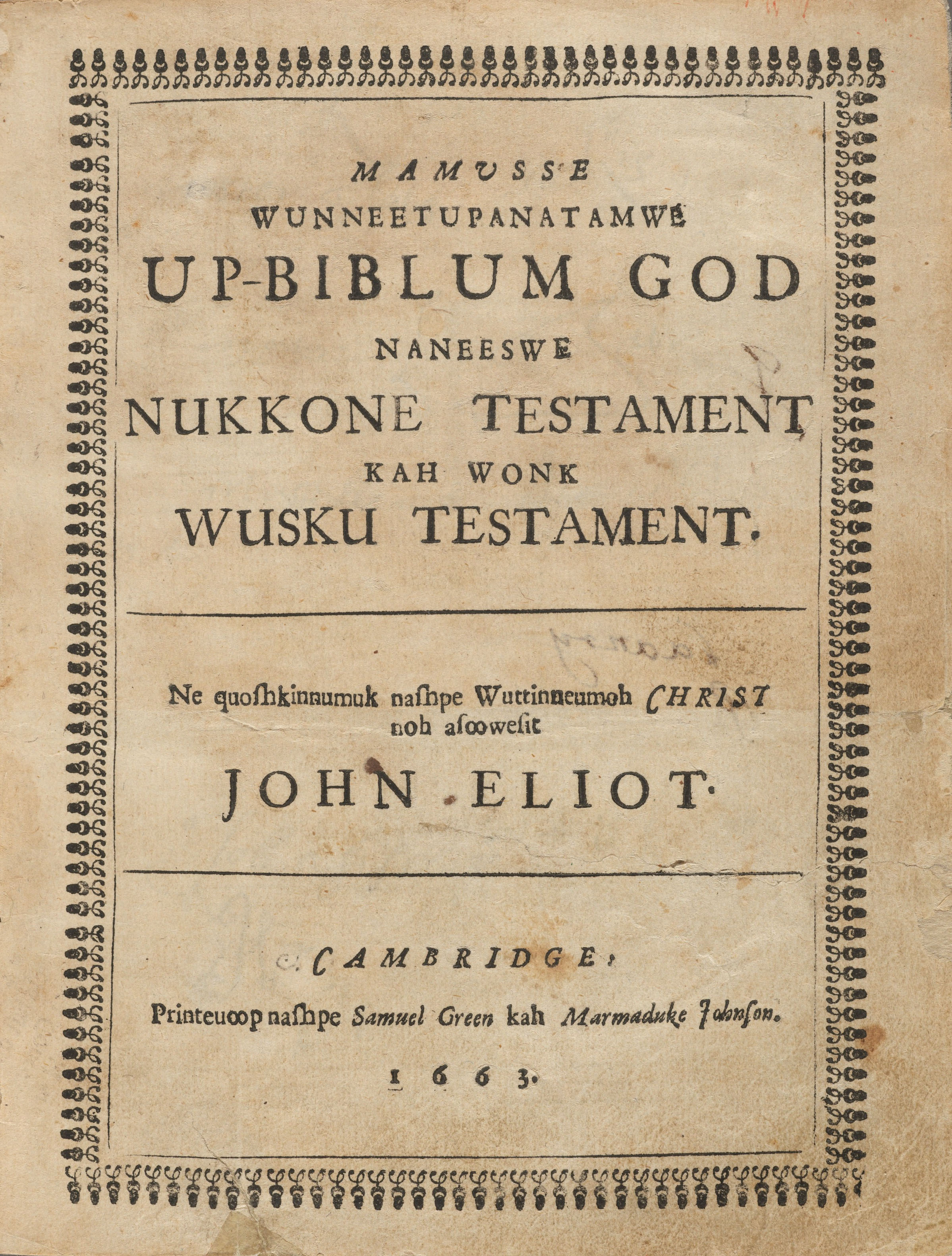
Eliot Indian Bible, printed in 1663 at Harvard Indian College's press

The Indian College building was the second location for the first printing press in the English colonies. Under missionary John Eliot's direction, that press was used to print a translation of the Bible into the Massachusett language. This Mamusse Wunneetupantamwe Um Biblum God, also known as the "Eliot Indian Bible", was the first Bible in any language printed in British North America, as well as the first full translation of the Christian Bible into a Native American language. James Printer, an Algonquian-speaking Nipmuc who converted to Christianity, did much of the translation and typesetting, and other Native Americans, such as Cockenoe, Job Nesuton, and John Sassamon (who studied at Harvard in 1653 prior to the creation of the Indian College), contributed to various parts of the translation.

The press issued 15 books in the Algonquian language and 85 in English. After a more accessible printing office opened in Boston in 1675, activity at the Indian College’s printing press greatly declined. Therefore, by 1680, the printing room was deserted, and Harvard formally shut it down after the death of the press's steward, Samuel Green in 1692.

=== Admissions ===
Specific details about the 17th-century admission process for Native American students at Harvard are limited. However, historical records indicate that Native American students, like Caleb Cheeshahteaumuck and Joel Hiacoomes, attended preparatory schools before admission, which suggests that preparatory education could have been a prerequisite. As mentioned, Native American students were promised free tuition, but that exact admission criteria and any differences between Native American and English applicants remain unclear.

=== Native American students ===
The Indian College building housed approximately four to five Native American students, and Caleb Cheeshahteaumuck became the first known Native American to graduate from Harvard. At least four Native American students attended the college (designed for 20 students total):

- Caleb Cheeshahteaumuck and Joel Hiacoomes were classmates. Members of the Wampanoag tribe from Martha's Vineyard, they attended a preparatory school in Roxbury and were admitted to Harvard for a scheduled graduation of 1665. A few months prior to graduation, Hiacoomes returned to Martha's Vineyard to visit relatives. On the return trip, he was shipwrecked on Nantucket and not seen again. Caleb Cheeshahteaumuck successfully graduated, but died a few months later in Watertown, probably from tuberculosis. His Latin address to the society, beginning "Honoratissimi benefactores" (transl. Most honored benefactors), has been preserved.
- John Wompas from the Nipmuc tribe, entered in 1666, but left the next year to become a mariner. He was already married before he admitted to Harvard and was in his late twenties.
- A student named Eleazar, from the Wampanoag tribe, entered in 1675, but contracted and died of smallpox shortly after. Years later, one of his poems was retrieved and later translated to modern English so that it can be published in an anthology by the Professor Lisa Brooks, from Harvard University.
- Joel Lacoombs from the Wampanoag tribe, was class of 1665 and was named valedictorian but, died before graduation because he was in a shipwreck. Harvard University then made a degree for Lacoombs and presented to the Wampanoag community, around 350 years later.
- Also, some have speculated that Daniel Takawambait, one of the first ordained Indian ministers, and others attended the Indian College.

=== Closure ===
Because of the diseases that many Native Americans contracted upon coming into close contact with the English community, the building was little used for its intended purpose. When Harvard Hall was completed in 1677, the English colonial students moved out of the Indian College and the building fell into disuse. In 1693 the Harvard authorities, intending to reuse the bricks to construct a new building, asked the Society for the Propagation of the Gospel in New England for permission to tear down the Indian College building. The Society's condition for approval was that Native American students "should enjoy their Studies rent free in said [new] building." By 1698 the old building was torn down, but the bricks were re-used in constructing the original Stoughton Hall which existed until 1781, when Stoughton Hall was also torn down due to masonry issues, but half of its bricks were again retained for reuse by the college. Today, the location is marked by a plaque on Mathews Hall in Harvard Yard.

== Legacy ==
Another member of the Nipmuc tribe, Benjamin Larnell, attended Harvard in the early 1700s, when the Indian College building no longer existed. John Leverett, president of Harvard between 1708 and 1724, described Larnell in his personal diary as "an Acute Grammarian, an Extraordinary Latin Poet, and a good Greek one". Judge Samuel Sewall wrote to a correspondent in London enclosing copies of Larnell's poems in Latin, Greek, and Hebrew as evidence of the progress made in educating the Native Americans, but those poems have not survived. Larnell died of a fever in 1714, aged about 20. Larnell's Latin versification of Aesop's fable of the fox and the weasel, probably written when Larnell was a student at Boston Latin School, was re-discovered in 2012 by Thomas Keeline and Stuart M. McManus.

In 1997, in a ceremony attended by 300 people, a historic plaque was placed at Matthews Hall in Harvard Yard to commemorate the Indian College.

As Drew Lopenzina and Lisa Brooks suggest, the Indian College offers us insights into how Indigenous Christians and scholars received or were subjected to colonial education, engaged in the literary production, and contributed to the multilingual start of American literary tradition. The Indian College promoted new forms of intercultural authority and intellectual exchange in addition to its function as a missionary institution. This work serves as a paradigm for applying concepts of affordance and practice to a multicultural colonial context.
