= Praying Indians of Natick =

Community of Indigenous Christian converts in Massachusetts

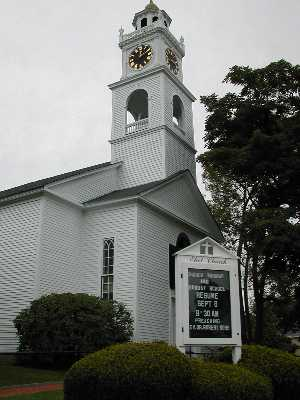
The Eliot Church in south Natick. The church was built in 1828 where the Indian Church once stood.

The Praying Indians of Natick are a community of Indigenous Christians, known as Praying Indians, established in the 17th century in the town of Natick, Massachusetts. Natick has been translated as "A Place of Hills," or "the Place of (our) Searching."

First settled in 1651 through the missionary efforts of Puritan minister John Eliot and the New England Company, Natick was the first and most prominent of several Praying Towns designed to Christianize Native American populations in New England. The praying town gathered Indigenous Christian converts from Massachusett, Nipmuc, and Pawtucket groups into a European-style settlement with Puritan moral codes.

Although indigenous cultural practices were discouraged, native language use was allowed to continue. As Eliot's missionary efforts evolved, the Natick dialect of the Massachusett language became historically prominent as the first Algonquian language to be printed, and as the language of the first Bible published in the Western Hemisphere.

The community was significantly disrupted by King Philip's War (1675–1676), during which Praying Indians faced displacement, internment, and hostility from both colonists and their non-Christianized indigenous foes. In the decades following the war, guardians appointed by the colonial authorities eroded Native autonomy, and the influx of white residents turned Natick into a patchwork of privately owned properties. By the mid-19th century, an official state report declared the Natick tribe "near extinct," noting only two surviving families, and the last common lands were sold.

Today, though not officially recognized by the federal government, several organizations continue to claim descent from the original Praying Indians of Natick.

== History ==
=== Praying town establishment (1646-1675) ===
Puritan colonists established Praying Towns in New England from 1646 to 1675. These served as refuges to Christian Native Americans, whose communities had been ravaged by infectious disease, warfare, and encroachment by white settlers.

The establishment of the Praying towns accomplished several goals. It helped facilitate the goals of Christianization and acculturation as it allowed for easier distribution of the Massachusett-language translations of Eliot's Bible and other works. The inhabitants were forced to observe the eight tenements of the "Leaf of Rules" distributed in the Bibles which forbid Indian cultural norms such as consenting premarital sex, cracking lice between teeth, avoidance of agriculture by men, and reinforced adoption of European clothing and hairstyles. For the colonial government, it brought the Indians fully under the control of the Massachusetts Bay Colony, with the Praying towns occupying a status similar to autonomous English colonial settlements. The aboriginal power structures remained somewhat intact, as Native peoples recognized both the traditional power systems, but the chiefs and the tribal élite maintained it by adopting the roles of administrators, clerks, translators, teachers, constables, jurors and tax collectors. The confinement benefited both the desires of Eliot and the colony, and Eliot was often accompanied by Daniel Gookin, the Superintendent to the Indians appointed to ensure cordial relations with the Indians and their adherence to the colonial laws, during his tours of the Praying towns. Similar settlements were established in the Plymouth Colony, such as the Massachusett Praying towns of Titicut and Mattakeeset.

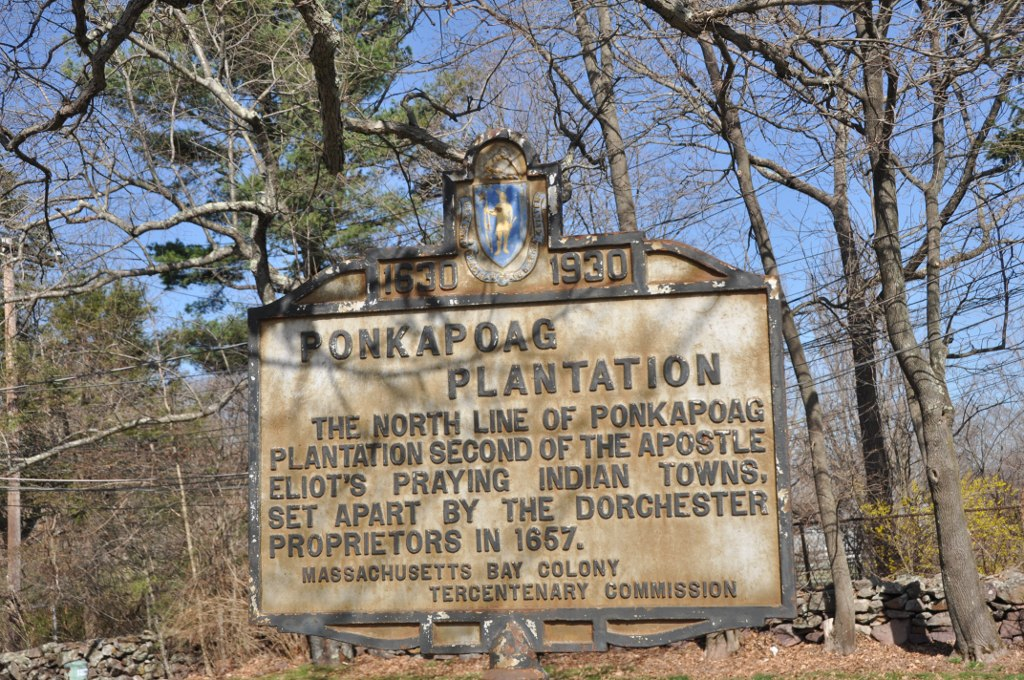
Historical marker standing on the northern boundary of what was once the Praying town of Ponkapoag, now contained in the town of Canton, Massachusetts.

The Massachusett benefited from clear titles of common land where they could plant, hunt and forage, and this likely attracted even more converts since the Praying towns established safe zones away from constant settler encroachment, requests for sales of land and harassment. The Massachusett also were able to revive their prestige, which they had long held prior to colonial settlement. Many of the Praying towns were established by Native missionaries drawn from Natick's old powerful families, affording them much respect in their adopted communities. The Massachusett began to replace the language of the Nipmuc and greatly leveled dialectal differences across the Massachusett-speaking area, due to the spread of Indian missionaries, but also because Massachusett became the language of literacy, prayer, and administration, likely facilitated by its historic use as a regional second language and backed by its use in the translation of the Bible. The Massachusett leaders were also closer to the colonial authorities and thus often chosen to spread official messages, restoring the old power dynamic vis-à-vis other tribes.

Life in the Praying towns was a mixture of European and Indian customs. Indians living there were forced to adopt Puritan dress, hairstyles and habits of modesty along with other cultural norms. They were encouraged to learn European methods of woodworking, carpentry, animal husbandry, and agriculture and Eliot arranged for many Indians to apprentice under several colonists to learn these skills. Natick had an independent congregation with a Christian church, but the services were conducted in Massachusett with Indian preachers and the parishioners were called by Native drumming. The Praying Indians maintained many aspects of their culture, such as foraging and hunting and food preferences but melded them with the Puritan culture and religion they were forced to adopt.

==== Natick Bible ====
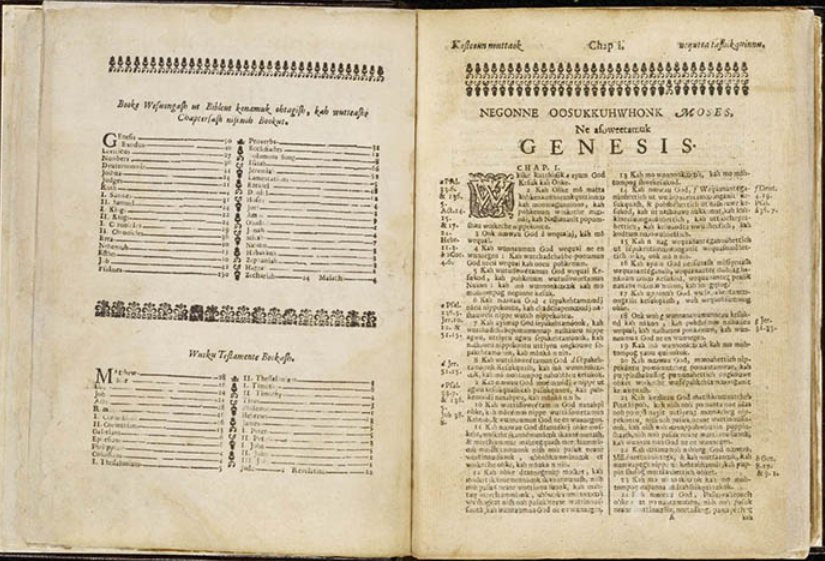
The index and first page of Genesis from Eliot's translation of the Bible into the Natick speech of Massachusett in 1663, the Mamusse Wunneetupanatamwe Up-Biblum God.

John Eliot learned the Massachusett language enough to preach to regional tribes, and working with several bilingual indigenous assistants, including Job Nesuton of Natick, translated the Bible into that language. They first translated the New Testament into the Massachusett language, which was published in 1661. Then the entire Bible was published in that language in 1685.

==== Lawsuits and land disputes ====
The truce between the colonies of Massachusetts Bay and Plymouth and local Native peoples was frequently tested. The submission of the local chiefs to the respective colonial governments and adoption of Christianity allowed the Indians to seek redress in the colonial judiciary and removed one of the prejudices against them. The Praying Indians of Natick were brought to court several times by groups of colonists from Dedham, Massachusetts that claimed some of the land, but with Eliot's assistance, most of these attempts failed. Most of the time, however, the Indians failed, as some of the Indian interpreters and chiefs ceded lands to curry favor from the colonists to maintain special privileges, such as the Nipmuc John Wampas, who betrayed the Nipmuc and Massachusett people by selling land to the settlers to which he had no claim, but these sales were upheld in later court challenges. The Pawtucket sachem Wenepoykin, son of Nanepashemet and Squaw Sachem of Mistick, through kinship and family ties laid claim to much of Massachusett territory, and tried several times to petition the courts for lands lost in the turbulence of the 1633 epidemic that took both of his brothers to no avail, with most cases simply dismissed.

The Massachusetts Bay Colony passed a series of harsh measures that earned the ire of the Native peoples. All Indians, Christian and traditional religionists, were forced to observe the Christian Sabbath and were restricted from a wide range of activities, such as hunting, fishing and farming or entering any colonial settlements, and heavy fines were imposed on those caught practicing the shamanic rights or consulting traditional spiritual leaders or healers. Alcohol, firearms and many luxury goods were banned. By this time, the Indians had already integrated into the economic system of the settlers, but were dealt a heavy blow as laws were passed restricting trade to appointed colonial agents, which gave the colonial government a monopoly on trade with the Indians and made Indian farmers less competitive as they were not allowed direct access to colonial markets. New laws allowed open settlement to any 'unimproved' lands, essentially anything that was not fenced in or with crops grown on it, threatening the wooded areas and meadows cleared by fire that were used for hunting and cultivation areas that were allowed to fallow.

=== King Philip's War (1675-1676) ===
The outbreak of King Philip's War from 1675 until 1676 was disastrous for both the Indians and the English colonists, with enormous bloodshed and destruction on both sides. The Massachusett, all of whom had become Praying Indians confined to Praying towns, remained neutral during the war but suffered heavy casualties. The Praying Indians were attacked in their fields and harassed by neighboring colonists who had become overwhelmed with panic, hysteria, and anti-Indian sentiment. The Praying towns were also targets of Metacomet's forces, raided for supplies and persuading or using force, bringing some of the Praying Indians to join. To appease the colonists, the Praying Indians accepted confinement to the Praying towns, curfews, increased colonial supervision, and surrendered their weapons.

=== Aftermath of King Philip's War (1676–1743) ===
King Philip's War significantly disrupted Indian life in New England. The Praying Indian survivors of internment, any Indians lucky enough to have been pardoned and any survivors regrouped at Natick, where they divided up among their pre-existing tribal groupings and pressed for a return to their lands. By 1681, the Indians were allowed to return to their respective homes but continued to face harassment, retaliatory attacks, local killings, and abuse to their lands and property by neighboring colonists.

The Indian missions were considered a failure. Natick absorbed many of the surrounding tribes. Okommakamesit was sold by the colonial authorities in 1685, as the colonial judiciary upheld forged deeds of questionable and sales, forcing most of the Nipmuc and Pawtucket of the community to settle in Natick. Wonalancet (c.1619—1697), a Pennacook sachem or leader, joined his nephew in Natick.

Disease, outmigration, and loss of land shrunk many of the former Indian communities below carrying capacity, and most young people often left for Natick to seek land, spouses, and employment. Most of the young Nipmuc had left Nashoba for Natick for these reasons.

The autonomy of the Indians was eroded by the dismantling of their lands. Natick was able to retain its local leadership, with the Natick elite serving the administrative roles of the community and holding the positions of the Indian church with daily affairs conducted in the Massachusett language. This continued until 1721, when record-keeping switched to English, and Oliver Peabody, a monolingual English-speaker, became the minister of the Indian church. Peabody used his position to encourage the Indians to sell land, in part so as to increase the amount of white settlers living in the Indian enclave. By the 1750s, Natick had ceased to be an Indian town, as it was more a messy patchwork of Indian common lands and white-owned property in between, and the town's governance and church had switched to English and was dominated by white colonists, although a few Indians continued to serve the church.

==== Natick Indian Identity ====
In the era following King Philip's War, Native American communities were often named by the locations in which they lived. While this community primarily included Massachusett people, it also members of neighboring Indigenous peoples of the Northeastern Woodlands, who collectively became known as Natick Indians, rather than Massachusett, Nipmuc, or Pawtucket.

=== Guardianship of the Indians (1743-1775) ===
Instead of being absorbed into the general affairs of a town which was now dominated by white colonists, the colonial government appointed a commissioner to oversee the Natick in 1743. Originally, the commissioner was charged to manage the timber resources, as most of the forests of New England had been felled to make way for farm and pasture, making the timber on Indian lands a valuable commodity. Very quickly, the guardian of Natick came to control the exchange of land, and any funds set up by the sale of Indian products, but mainly land. As the guardians assumed more power and were rarely supervised, many instances of questionable land sales by the guardians and embezzlement of funds have been recorded. The appointment of the guardians reduced the Indians to colonial wards, as they were no longer able to directly address the courts, vote in town elections, and removed the power of the Indian chiefs.

Land was the Indians' only commodity, which their guardians often sold to pay for treatments for the sick, care of orphans, and debts incurred by Indians, but Indians were also the victims of unfair credit schemes that often forced the land out of their hands.

==== The French and Indian Wars and the American Revolutionary War ====
The French in Canada and their Abenaki allies raided settlements of the Massachusetts Colony. The English colonists enlisted the help of the men of the Indian communities to fight in engagements such as King William's War (1689–1699), Queen Anne's War (1704–1713), Dummer's War (1722–1724), King George's War (1744–1748), Father Le Loutre's War (1749–1755) and the French and Indian War (1754–1760). Many fought with distinction as guides, interpreters and scouts in units such as Gorham's Rangers, such as Abraham Speen, John Babysuck and Jonathan Womsquam, all of whom had ties to Natick's old families.

Many Native Americans also died in service of the American Revolutionary War. (1775–1783). Native American veterans of the Revolution include Joseph Paugenitt, Jonas Obscow, Alexander Quapish of Natick. A memorial to the Natick Indians veterans of the American Revolutionary War was erected in the South Natick.

Smithsonian historians write, "The Natick Indians, once the successful experiment in attempted acculturation, were 'practically extinct' by the time of the 1848 senate report," made to the Massachusetts state senate.

=== Post-independence and 19th century ===
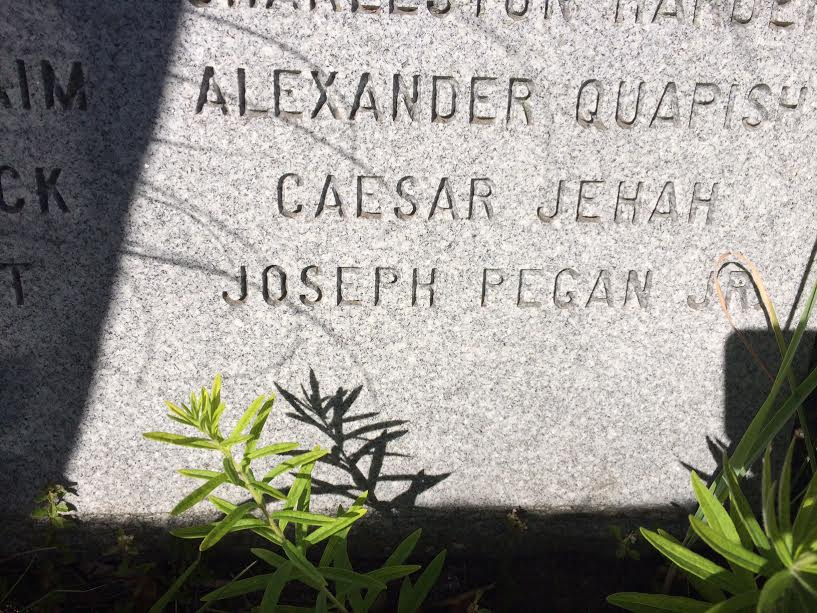
Memorial to the Praying Indian veterans of Natick that served in the American Revolutionary War

The Colony of Massachusetts' transition into the Commonwealth of Massachusetts, which officially joined the new republic of the United States of America, did not improve the lot of the Indians in the new state. With the exception of the regime change, most of the policies and laws concerning the Indians of the colonial period were adopted unaltered. The Indians became wards of the Commonwealth, as the guardian system remained intact.

==== Intermarriage ====
Intermarriage, which occurred some in the mid-18th century, accelerated in the 19th century as Indian men were lost to war and remote economic activities, such as whaling. With Native women far outnumbering Native men, many Native women married Black men, since Black people in colonial New England suffered an inverse gender imbalance as few Black women were present. The children were born free, since while slavery was not abolished in Massachusetts until 1787, with laws at the time passing the status of slave through the mother. In addition, the children were readily accepted into the Indian community due to the local matrilineal and matrilocal cultures. Intermarriage with White men also occurred despite colonial anti-miscegenation laws, especially those of lesser means or banished from their communities. Although most Indian men returned to the Indian communities to settle and marry, long times at sea or between work in the whaling port cities, many Indian men also increasingly married and settled with women of other tribes or brought home Black spouses as they were segregated in "colored" sections of communities.

==== Decline ====
Most of the remaining lands set aside "in perpetuity" for the Native peoples had been sold to non-Natives, leaving a messy patchwork of a few remaining common lands, individual allotments, leased lands, and numerous white proprietors situated in between Indian households. The Natick, whose lands were the first Praying towns created by Eliot and the General Court, were able to hold onto their communal lands until the early 19th century. The last of the common lands of Natick were sold sometime after the death of Hannah Dexter in 1821, but most of the common lands had already been sold off by 1750. The last dozen acres owned in common by the Ponkapoag was sold by the guardians in 1828, although a small area of land was not sold until 1840 but the Natick Indians had already been evicted and prohibited from its use. In both cases the land was sold for medical costs for the very elderly and ill.

The end of tribal land did not remove the restrictions of the guardians even if it was the original purpose to have stewards of the land on the Native peoples' "behalf." As wards of the colonial and later state government, the Indians were restricted from voting in local elections or seeking redress through the courts on their own. Some of the Indians were supported by annuities established from the funds generated by land sales or initiated by the guardians for their support. The guardians, however, no longer had to maintain the rigorous lists of people associated with the land, which long had been used to segregate the Indians from the non-Indians especially as rates of intermarriage had increased.

The end of the Praying towns did not end Indian presence in these regions, although the records of the Native peoples in New England become scant as the guardians focused their attentions on the few Indians under their supervision. Although a few Natick remained in the community as private landholders, many of the Natick moved westward seeking spouses and possible chance of land with the Chaubunagungamaug who would have a reservation until 1887.

==== 19th century censuses ====
The Commonwealth of Massachusetts ordered reports on the condition of the Indians, mainly for the purposes of keeping track of the expenses and check up on the guardians, who more or less operated autonomously with little oversight from the General Court. The first was Denny Report of 1848, which was a very preliminary look. The report only made no effort to determine the number of Natick. A year later, a more detailed report was released, which came to be known as the Briggs Report of 1849, which again does not list any Natick. The most detailed, and last, of the reports conducted by John Milton Earle was started in 1859 and published in 1861, includes even more information, such as surnames, location, and profession.

Earle writes, "Of all the tribes which held reservations, and were placed under guardianship by the States, the Natick Tribe is nearest extinct. ... [O]nly two families remain, and one of these is descended equally from the Naticks and the Hassanamiscoes. Their whole number is twelve. ..." He continues, "This tribe has no common lands," and recommends their remain funds be divided equally among the two surviving families. Earle observes that a few Natick descendants merged into the Nipmuc people and also writes, "There are some others, who claim to be of the Natick Tribe, but the claim appears to have no foundation other than that one of their ancestors formerly resided in Natick, but it is believed that he never was supposed to belong to the tribe."

Several organizations, who are not recognized as Native American tribes by the US federal or Massachusetts state governments claim descent from the Praying Indians of Natick.

== Prominent individuals ==
- Waban, often recognized as the first of John Eliot's converts to Christianity, among the founders of Natick, relocating from Nonantum.
- Job Nesuton, translator of the Eliot Indian Bible, killed in King Philip's War.
- Daniel Takawambait, first indigenous ordained minister in the Massachusetts Bay Colony, and the first indigenous minister to Natick following Eliot's death.
- James Rumney Marsh alias Quonopohit, kin to the Pawtucket-Naumkeag sachem line, a prominent indigenous fighter for the English side in King Philip's War, and namesake of Lake Quannapowitt.
- Wenepoykin alias Sagamore George, last widely acknowledged Pawtucket-Naumkeag sachem. Enslaved and sent to Barbados for participation in King Philip's War. Upon his return, died in Natick in the home of James Rumney Marsh.
- Cutshamekin, Massachusett sachem who was a leader in Natick in its early years before his death in 1654.
