= Praying Indian =

17th-century term for Christian American-Indians

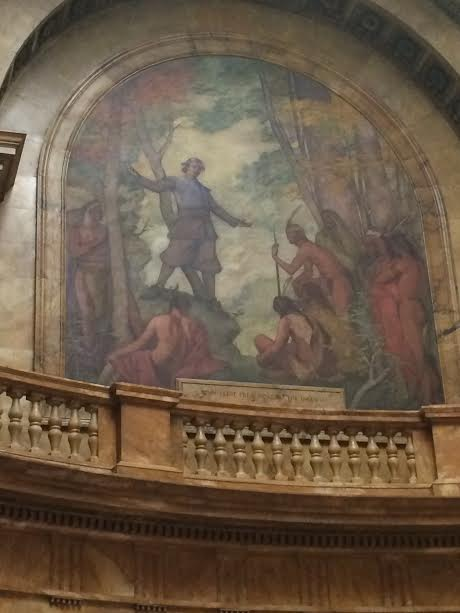
Puritan minister John Eliot leads Natick Indians in Christian prayer, as depicted on the mural of the rotunda on the Massachusetts State House in Boston

Praying Indian is a 17th-century term referring to Native Americans of New England, New York, Ontario, and Quebec who converted to Christianity either voluntarily or involuntarily. Many groups are referred to by the term, but it is more commonly used for tribes that were organized into praying towns. Praying towns were villages established by missionaries such as the Puritan leader John Eliot and Jesuit missionaries who established the St. Regis and Kahnawake (formerly known as Caughnawaga) and the missions among the Huron in western Ontario.

== Reasons for conversion ==
=== Indigenous ===
In addition to adopting Christianity for its own sake (as carried on by modern Praying Indians of Natick and Ponkapoag), becoming a praying Indian had several potential benefits.

As settler encroachment along with disease and epidemics eroded their political sovereignty, many Indigenous groups in New England found it necessary to align themselves with the English colonists; this typically meant adopting the Puritan religion, as the colonists distinguished Native enemies from allies largely by their willingness to convert. Praying towns theoretically ensured land security under colonial authority. Proximity to the English protected praying Indians from their enemies and could have benefitted them economically. Some reasoned that "the Englishman's God doth better for them than other Gods do for others"; if traditional religious practices could not protect Indigenous people from settler encroachment and disease, perhaps Christianity could.

However, praying Indians were expected to adopt Puritan cultural norms (to become "civilized", in the eyes of the colonists), thus alienating them from their former cultural heritage and social ties. Generally the more powerful sachems (paramount chiefs) refused to convert and pushed their followers to do the same, as such a rupture would threaten the sachems' authority. Praying Indians were frequently met with ridicule by other Natives—while at the same time, they remained segregated from English colonists.

=== Missionaries ===
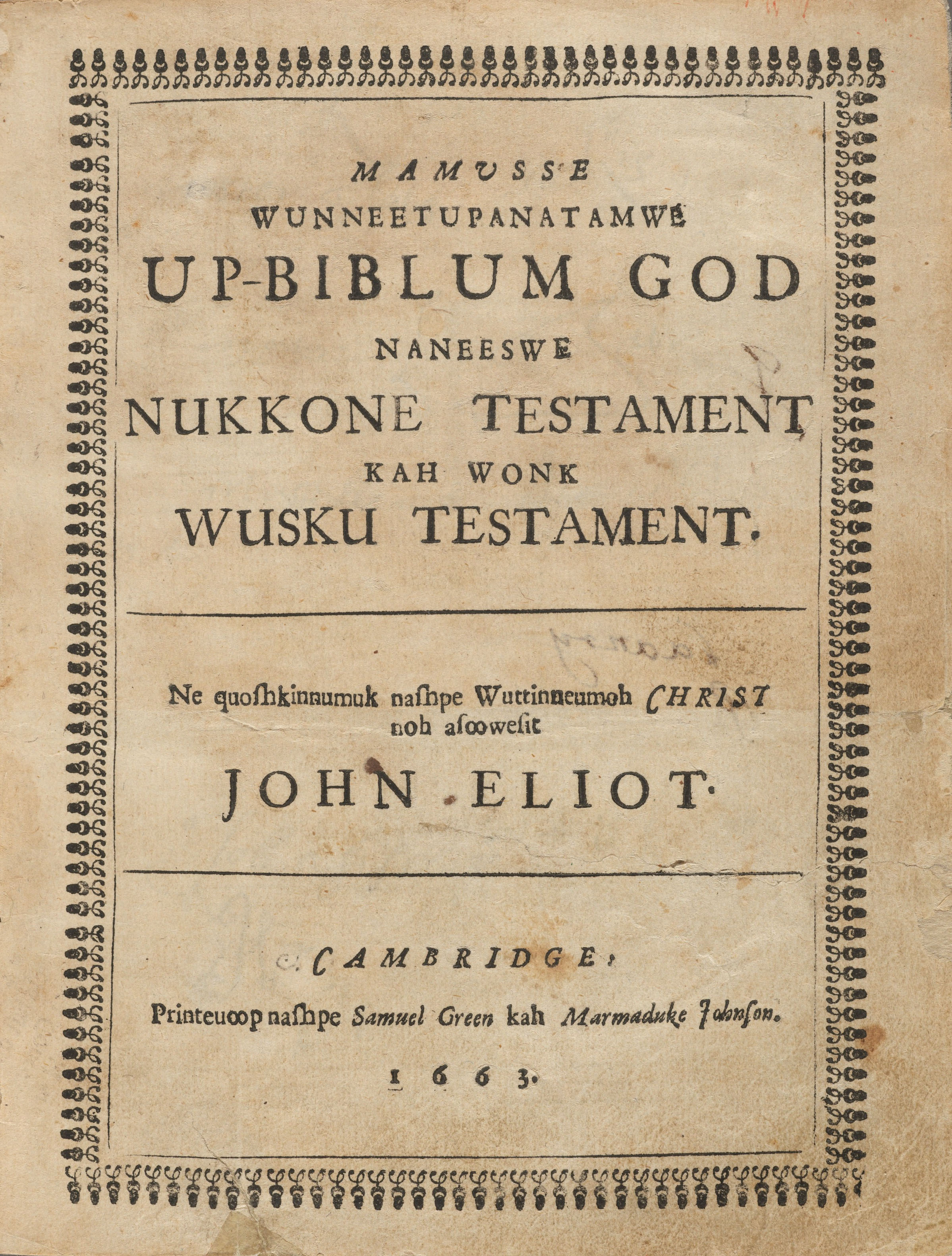
Mamusse Wunneetupanatamwe Up-Biblum God (1663) or the Eliot Indian Bible, a translation of the Bible into Massachusett, an Eastern Algonquian tongue, and the first Bible printed in British North America

There has been debate among scholars about whether New England missionary work, particularly that of John Eliot, served to advance English hegemony or counteract it—the former argued by, for instance, Francis Jennings and Neal Salisbury, the latter by Alden T. Vaughan and Richard W. Cogley.

Regardless, praying towns, which were positioned along the border of the Massachusetts Bay Colony, could provide defense against enemy attacks. Praying Indian soldiers were also valued by colonists for their experience with Indigenous combat methods—namely stealth—which were unfamiliar to the colonists.

== Early history ==
In 1646, the General Court of Massachusetts passed an "Act for the Propagation of the Gospel amongst the Indians." It and the success of Reverend John Eliot and other missionaries preaching Christianity to the New England tribes raised interest in England. In 1649, the Long Parliament passed an ordinance forming "A Corporation for the Promoting and Propagating the Gospel of Jesus Christ in New England," which raised funds to support the cause.

Contributors raised approximately £12,000 to invest in the cause, to be used mainly in the Massachusetts Bay Colony and in the Province of New York. Eliot received financial aid from the corporation to start schools to teach the Native Americans. The Indian nations involved appear to have included the Massachusett and the Nipmuc.

On October 28, 1646, in Nonantum (now Newton), Eliot preached his first sermon to Native Americans in their Massachusett language in the wigwam of Waban, the first convert of his tribe. Waban later offered his son to be taught in the ways of the European colonists and served as an interpreter. Eliot translated the Bible into the Massachusett language and published it in 1663 as Mamusse Wunneetupanatamwe Up-Biblum God. By 1675, 20% of New England's Natives were living in praying towns.

Christian Indian Towns eventually spread throughout Eastern and Central Massachusetts and included Littleton (Nashoba), Lowell (Wamesit, initially incorporated as part of Chelmsford), Grafton (Hassanamessit), Marlborough (Okommakamesit), Hopkinton (Makunkokoag), Canton (Punkapoag), Mendon-Uxbridge (Wacentug), Billerica (Shawshin), and Natick. Only Natick has retained its original name. Praying Indian Towns started by Eliot extended into Connecticut and included Wabaquasset (Senexet, Wabiquisset), six miles west of the Quinebaug River in present-day Woodstock, the largest of the three northeastern Connecticut praying towns.

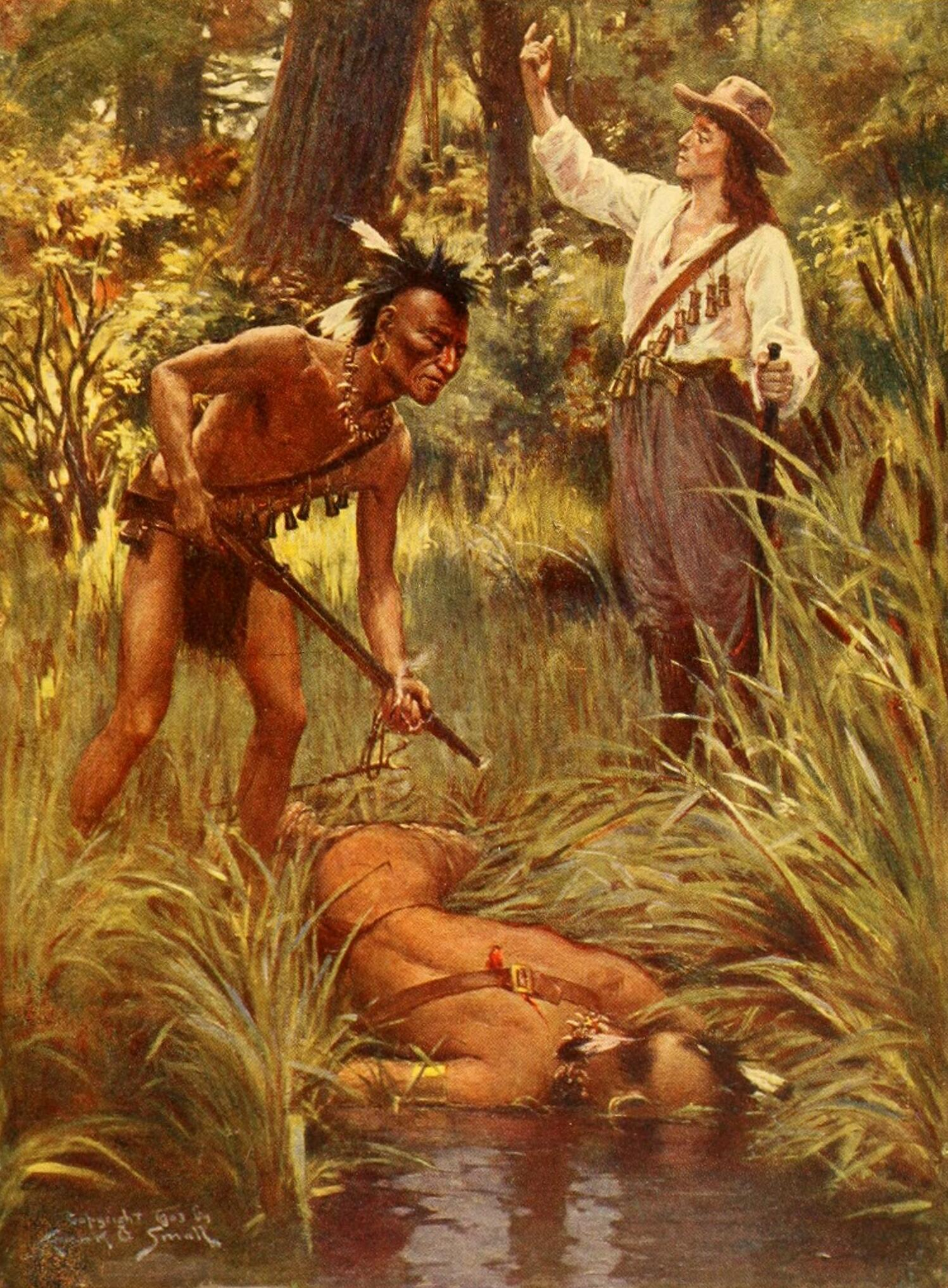
John Alderman (left), a Praying Indian, standing over the corpse of Metacomet, Chief Sachem of the Wampanoag killed in King Philip's War, as imagined in a painting from 1903

The towns were located to serve as an outlying wall of defense for the colony, a function that came to an end in 1675, during King Philip's War. Praying Indians offered their service as scouts to the colonists in Massachusetts but were rejected by the Puritans in Boston. Instead, praying Indian residents were first confined to their villages and were thus restricted from their farms and unable to feed themselves. Many were confined on Deer Island in Boston Harbor.

John Eliot and many others in the Plymouth Colony tried to prevent it, but it is reported that it became dangerous in Massachusetts to talk positively about any Native Americans, which likely contributed to the initial successes of the Indian rebellion. The order for removal was passed in October 1675, and by December, well over 1,000 Christian Indians had been brought to Deer Island, where many died during the winter due to the harsh conditions. The survivors were released in 1676.

After the war, in part because of the loss of life, the General Court of Massachusetts disbanded 10 of the original 14 towns in 1677 and placed the rest under the supervision of colonists, but some communities survived and retained their religious and education systems.

=== Slavery ===
Indigenous peoples of the Americas including praying Indians were trafficked through Atlantic trade routes. The 1677 work The Doings and Sufferings of the Christian Indians, for example, documents Indian prisoners of war in New England (who were not opposing combatants, but praying Indians) being enslaved and sent to the West Indies.

=== Praying Indians of Dedham ===
In the mid-17th century, John Eliot and a group of praying Indians from Dedham, Massachusetts won a lengthy court battle and were awarded the title to the 2,000 acres (810 ha) of land in the town that is now known as Natick.

The dispute, which lasted from 1651 to 1665 and flared up again sporadically in the years afterward, centered on the Indians' use of a tract of land along the Charles River. They claimed to have an agreement to use the land for farming with the Town Fathers, but Dedham officials objected to them.

Eliot had converted many of the native people in the area to Christianity and taught them how to live an agrarian life. He converted so many that the group needed a large portion of land on which to grow their own crops. However, the law was on the side of the town.

The case eventually went before the General Court, which granted the land in question to the Indians and, in compensation for the land lost, gave another piece of land in what is today Deerfield, Massachusetts to the Dedham settlers. The town's actions in the case were characterized by "deceptions, retaliations, and lasting bitterness" and harassed its Native neighbors with petty accusations even after the case had been settled.

== American Revolutionary War ==
A significant number of praying Indians fought for the Continental Army during the Revolutionary War. During the war, the vast majority of those Indians had been assimilated into their surrounding Christian communities and had fewer significant ties to other Native communities. They fought in entirely integrated units, unlike the African-American soldiers from the Revolutionary War to World War II.

There is no evidence of official discrimination towards Native American soldiers. They received equal pay and treatment as compared to their white counterparts. That is a direct contrast to unit segregation in the Civil War, for instance. Soldiers of Native American origin fought in several significant battles during the Revolutionary War such as Bunker Hill, Battle Road, Trenton, and Saratoga. The number of Praying Indian soldiers was likely over 100, but an entirely accurate count is hard to come by.

Unlike other Native groups such as the Haudenosaunee Confederacy, the praying Indians were cohesive and steadfast in their support for the colonists. The Iroquois Confederacy had several factions, most of which supported the British during the Revolutionary War, but some decided to fight with the colonists. That inevitably led to clashes involving previously aligned groups, when Native nations on opposite sides of the conflict met on the field of battle. For example, the Battle of Oriskany on August 6, 1777, saw Loyalist Seneca soldiers fighting against colonially-aligned Oneidas.

The praying Indians never saw such a split. They had extremely close ties to both the Puritan clergy that established the praying towns, as well as non-Native peoples that lived among them. Despite the continued seizure of Native lands, the various Praying Indian communities reasoned that their continued survival could be ensured only by maintaining these ties; support of a distant government would only alienate them from those who were in proximity.

In particular, Praying Indians from Natick and Ponkapoag (now Canton) served in large numbers. The borders of Natick have since changed and includes parts of what was Needham, Dedham.

The first significant engagements praying Indians participated in were the Battles of Battle Road and Bunker Hill. Approximately five out of the estimated 21 Native Americans at Battle Road were from Praying Indian communities, and out of the estimated 103 Native Americans at Bunker Hill, about 10 were praying Indians from the Natick area (primary source confirmation of service histories has numbers that are significantly less). As a result of the unit integration in the Continental Army, most cases had no real concentration of praying Indians in a single unit. Praying Indians served in dozens of distinct units throughout the Revolutionary War. The Battle of King's Bridge in the Bronx, where both Daniel Nimham, the last sachem of the Wappinger and his son Abraham were killed alongside some 60 members of the Stockbridge Militia is a notable exception.

=== Soldiers of praying Indian origin ===
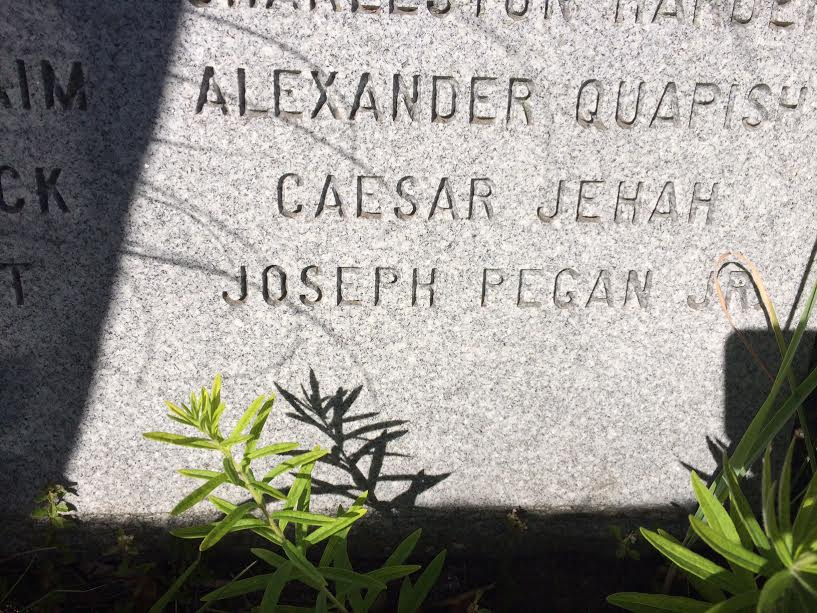
A partial list of names on the Natick monument

Historian George Quintal Jr. discusses Revolutionary war veterans who were Native American, African-American, and other minority groups in his book Patriots of Color: 'A Peculiar Beauty and Merit'. A sampling of histories of praying Indian soldiers is found below.

James Anthony was born in Natick and initially served for eight months in 1775 in the regiment of Col. Jonathan Ward and in the company of Capt. James Mellen. He later re-enlisted for three years from 1777 to 1780 in the 4th Massachusetts Regiment under Col. William Shepherd, serving in Capt. Reuben Slayton's company. The unit fought at Saratoga and was present at Valley Forge during the winter of 1777. Anthony was discharged 14 March 1780.

Joseph Paugenit Jr. (Mashpee Wampanoag) was born in Framingham and was baptized in Natick in 1754. His father, Joseph Sr., fought during the French and Indian War. He served in the company of Capt. Thomas Drury under the command of Col. John Nixon, and fought at Bunker Hill. He later re-enlisted in Col. Thomas Nixon's fourth Regiment in New York and fought at the Battles of Harlem Heights and White Plains. After his second discharge, he re-enlisted a second time, once again under Col. Thomas Nixon. He fought at the Battle of Saratoga and was reported as deceased soon after, likely as the result of wounds sustained during the battle or from contracting smallpox.

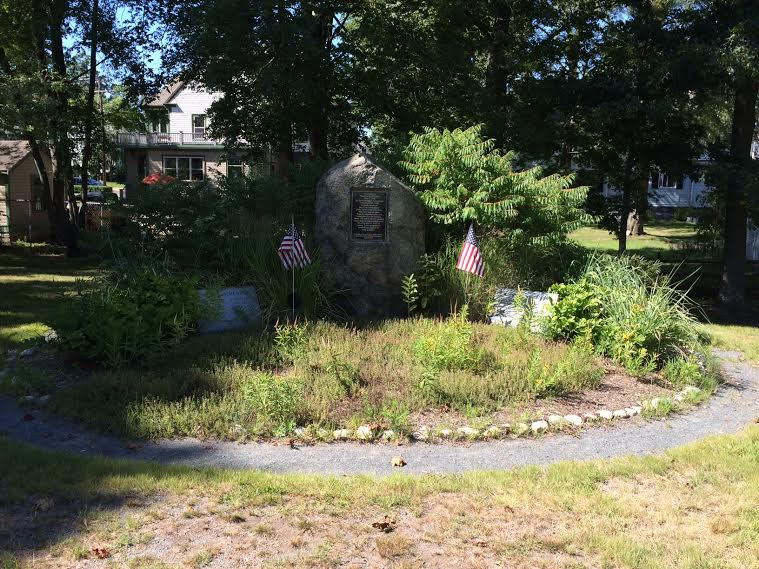
A memorial dedicated to Praying Indian veterans of the Revolutionary War

Alexander Quapish (Wampanoag, 1741–1776), born in Wampanoag territory in Yarmouth, Massachusetts, enlisted in Dedham in 1775. He served as a member 13th Massachusetts Regiment of Col. Jonathan Brewer. He took ill in November 1775 and died in Needham in March 1776. Michael Bacon cared for him in his last days and conducted his burial. Quapish's remains were disinterred and donated to the Warren Anatomical Museum. Under NAGPRA, the Mashpee Wampanoag and Nipmuc Nation were able to return his remains to the Pond Street Burial Ground in Needham (now Natick).

Samuel Comecho served in the Battle of Bunker Hill under the command of Capt. Benjamin Bullard in Col. Jonathan Brewer's regiment. Born in Natick, Comecho enlisted for eight month's service and his unit held the line at Bunker Hill between the redoubt and the rail fence. He re-enlisted on the first day of 1776 in Col. Asa Whitcomb's regiment and served in Capt. William Hudson Ballard's company in the Canadian theater. It was reported that he died on March 14, 1776. The cause of death was likely smallpox.

=== Legacy ===
It was not until the 20th century that praying Indian veterans were first recognized. The town of Natick installed a monument to Native American veterans of the Revolutionary War in 1900, which still stands today on Pond Street near Natick Center. However, it was not until Needham historian Robert D. Hall Jr. that their final resting places were properly honored. Hall and volunteers placed grave markers and American flags in a Needham cemetery to honor these veterans in 2003.

== Self-government ==
The Praying Indian communities were able to exercise self-government and to elect their own rulers (sachems) and officials, to some extent exhibited continuity with precontact social systems and used their own language as the language of administration of which a wealth of legal and administrative documents has survived. However, their self-government was gradually curtailed in the 18th and 19th centuries, when their languages also became extinct. During that period, most of the original Praying Towns eventually declined because of epidemics and the communal land property of others passing out of Native control. The Indian-inhabited areas were eventually transformed into "Indian districts."

== Notable Praying Indians ==
- Hiacoomes (~1610s – 1690) Wampanoag from Noepe (Martha's Vineyard) who in 1643 became the first member of his society to convert to Christianity
- Black James (also known as Wullumahchein) — Nipmuc spiritual leader and constable for the praying towns.
- Cutshamekin — Massachusett leader of the Natick praying town, formerly a sachem; John Eliot preached his first sermon in Massachusett to Cutshamekin and his followers, who at first rejected him.
- Daniel Takawambait — Nipmuc pastor in Natick; possibly the first ordained Native American Christian.
- James Printer — Nipmuc printer and translator of the Eliot Indian Bible; later a scribe for Metacomet, aka King Philip.
- Job Nesuton — Massachusett teacher in Natick and translator of the Eliot Indian Bible.
- John Alderman — Wampanoag soldier for the colonists during King Philip’s War; shot and killed Metacomet.
- John Sassamon — Massachusett interpreter and schoolmaster in Natick; his assassination by 3 of Metacomet’s men marked the start of King Philip’s War.
- Peter Jethro — Nipmuc scribe, minister, and teacher in Natick.
- Waban — one of the first Massachusett converts to Christianity.

== Contemporary heritage groups ==
In the 21st century, people who identify as descendants of praying Indians have formed different organizations. They are unrecognized and are not federally recognized tribes or state-recognized tribes. These include the Massachusett Tribe at Ponkapoag and Praying Indians of Natick and Ponkapoag.

== See also ==
- Moravian Indians
- Mission Indians
- Indian Reductions
- Stockbridge Indians
- Detribalization
- Spanish Indians
