= James Printer =

17th–18th century Nipmuc printer and scribe

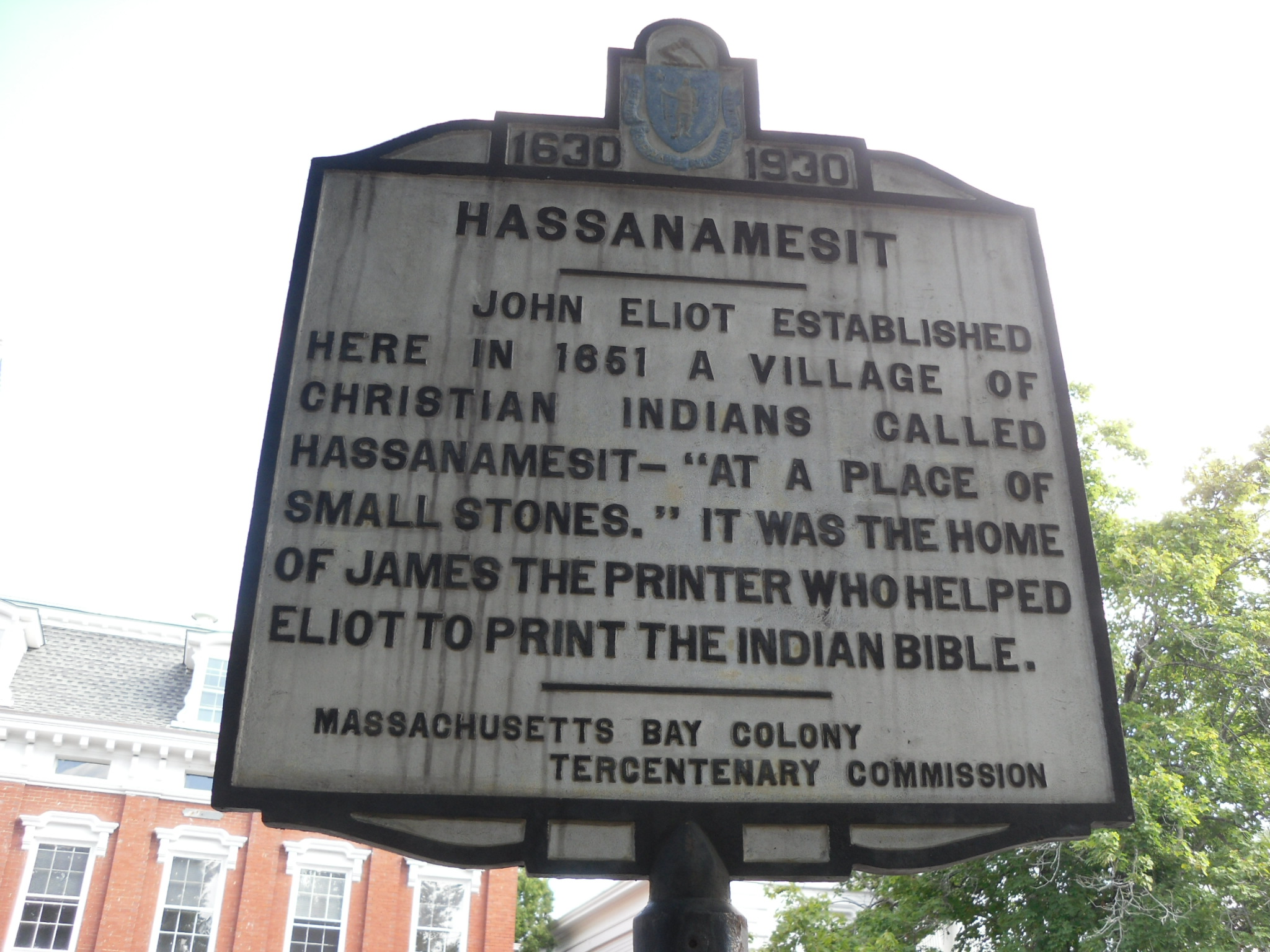
Historic marker, marking the hometown of James Printer and referencing his work with Eliot on the first Bible published in North America

Wawaus, also known as "James Printer", was a Nipmuc leader from Hassanamesit (today Grafton, Massachusetts), who experienced the incorporation and marginalization of his people in colonial Massachusetts. He is most commonly known for his work at the first printing press in the American colonies, yet like many Indigenous people during the 17th century in New England, was mistreated, abused, arrested, threatened, falsely imprisoned, and forced into exile on Deer Island in the Boston Harbor by the settlers. He helped produce the first Indian Bibles in the Massachusett language (an Algonquin language), which were used in part by the colonists for the cultural assimilation of Native Americans. He also set the type for books including the famous Narrative of the Captivity and Restoration of Mrs. Mary Rowlandson.

== Early life ==
Little is known of Wawaus's early years. He was born at Hassanamesit near what is now Grafton, Massachusetts, to a Nimuc named Naoas. Naoas was a convert of John Eliot and was a leading member of the Christian Native church in Hassanamesit.

== Education ==
Printer attended Harvard’s Indian College beginning in 1659. He worked as an apprentice to Samuel Green at his printing press. Through his apprenticeship he became an accomplished typesetter and Algonquian/English language translator. He lived and worked among the English settlers for nearly his entire lifetime.

== Printing career ==
Printer was the first Native American printer's devil in America. He played an instrumental role in the printing of John Eliot's Indian Bible, the first Bible printed in America in the Massachusett language. Printer helped to complete 1000 copies of the Indian Bible before the end of 1663.

While other multilingual Native Americans contributed to the enormous project, Printer was said to have been the most accomplished interpreter who did the most work of any of the translators who created the Massachusett translation of the Bible. Several scholars point out that the Bible attributed to Eliot alone was most likely composed by Native Americans, and that Wawaus along with Cockenoe and Job Nesuton deserve at least equal credit for the production of Eliot's collection of publications in Native American languages.

In addition to the Indian Bible, Printer helped to produce Indian Primers and two books of Psalms. He also typeset Puritan missionary writings which publicized his and other Christian Native Americans' piety. Involved in the typesetting of the Cambridge editions of Mary Rowlandson's famous captivity narrative, A Narrative of the Captivity and Restoration of Mrs. Mary Rowlandson, in which he appears as a minor character during Rowlandson's ransom negotiations.

Printer worked as a typesetter for 16 years before the outbreak of King Philip's War.

== King Philip's War ==
Printer made a major contribution to American literature during King Philip's War while he worked as a scribe for King Philip, also known as Metacomet.

During the war, Printer left Harvard Indian College in Cambridge for Hassanamesit. At the outbreak of King Philip's War, Printer was falsely accused of participating in the Lancaster raid, a raid on Lancaster, Massachusetts. He narrowly escaped death after a mob of colonists launched this accusation.

Following Wawaus's escape to Hassanamesit, the town was confronted by Nipmuc messengers from Menimesit carrying an urgent warning to the families at Hassanamesit: to “go with them quietly” to Menimesit, because if“you go to the English again [they will] force you all to some Island as the Natick Indians are, where you will be in danger and starved with cold and hunger, and most probably in the end be all sent out of the country for slaves.” Wawaus, like the other inhabitants, chose to go with Metacomet's men. During his willing captivity, it is believed that he, along with other Native American Christian captives came to sympathize with Metacomet's men.

Printer is also known for two notable letters he produced during King Philip's War. These letters were written by the Native Americans to the English settlers.

The first was found tacked to a bridge post outside of the town of Medfield, Massachusetts in 1675. While the note was unsigned, several scholars have attributed the note to James Printer. It states that the English have provoked the Native Americans to war and that the Native Americans have nothing to lose in the fight but their lives, while English may also lose their property and possessions. The letter is notable for its shrewdness in pointing out that the loss of the colonists' private property would make them vulnerable. The fact that the letter was written in English is evidence that it could only have been written by a Native American with extensive Christian education, and shows that the colonists' attempts to assimilate Native Americans through such methods were not wholly successful.

The second letter is known to have been written by Printer during King Philip's War and concerns the ransom for Mary Rowlandson, Mrs. John Kettell, and other colonists held captive by King Philip's men. This letter was part of the negotiations for the release of Rowlandson and her fellow captives, and can be read as an diplomatic attempt by Printer to mend fences with the settlers. The letter is an extraordinary example of early Native American writing and is evidence of Printer's notable writing skills. Ironically, he later worked as the typesetter for Mary Rowlandson's narrative of her captivity The Sovereignty and Goodness of God published in 1682.

After the war, Printer was granted amnesty.

== Later life ==
After King Philip's War, Wawaus went back to Cambridge to work as a printer again. He later returned to Hassanamesit and taught there, becoming a tribal leader and advocating for Nipmuck land holdings.
