= Richard Callicott =

New England colonist

- Born: Barnstaple, England, 1604
- Died: 1686; Boston, Massachusetts Bay Colony
- Resting place: Copp's Hill Burying Ground
- Occupation(s): trader, tailor, agent
- Spouse(s): Joanna Thorne (1627–1640), Thomasine (1641–his death)

Richard Callicott (1604–1686) (also spelled "Collacott," "Collicot", "Calicot", "Collacot") was a New England colonist who was a fur trader, land investor, and early leader of the Massachusetts Bay Colony. He also had two Native American servants who became prominent translators in New York and New England.

Callicott was born in Barnstaple, Devon, England, in 1604. He settled in Massachusetts in 1631/32 in the area which was then known as Dorchester (now Milton), near where Israel Stoughton built his grist mill in 1634. Callicott built a wharf and trading post on the Neponset River to trade with the local Native Americans, and he purchased large grants of land from Sachem Cutshamekin. Callicott constructed his "house in 1634 at [what is now] the northwest corner of Adams and Center Streets in Dorchester, on the Colonial Road to Plymouth. Not far away, he built a wharf on Gulliver's Creek as a landing for smaller boats to carry the furs to market." Callicot was a leader in the First Parish Church of Dorchester. Callicott took in several Native American orphans as servants including John Sassamon, who became a notable figure as a missionary and adversary of King Philip. Callicot served in Massachusetts Bay as a surveyor, selectman, deputy, and commissary for the troops during the Pequot War in 1637. During the War, Callicot received a captured Native American, known as Cockenoe, as a servant, and Cockenoe later became a translator for John Eliot in completing the Eliot Indian Bible, the first Bible printed in America. Callicott surveyed the boundary between Dedham and Dorchester in 1638 and between Massachusetts and Connecticut in 1641. Callicott became an early member of the Ancient and Honorable Artillery Company of Massachusetts. Callicott was also an associate of Roger Williams, for whom Callicot served as his power of attorney in a legal dispute. Callicot later settled in Saco and Portland in the Province of Maine for a period, before returning to Boston.

== Personal life ==
Callicot married twice: firstly to Joanna Thorne, who died in 1640. The following year, he married Thomasine. Callicott's daughter, Bethiah, married the son of Daniel Gookin, a politician, military leader, and writer about Native Americans.

== Death ==
Callicott died in Boston in 1686.
