= John Sassamon =

American Indian murder victim

- Died: 1675
- Cause of death: Assassination
- Known for: contributions to the Eliot Indian Bible

John Sassamon, also known as Wussausmon (c. 1620–1675), was a Massachusett man who lived in New England during the colonial era and participated in the creation and administration of praying towns. His assassination was one of the major events leading up to King Philip's War (1675–78).

Wussausmon, known to English colonists as John Sassamon, learned English, converted to Christianity and became a praying Indian, helping to serve as an interpreter to New England colonists. Sassamon served as a soldier and interpreter under the English colonist Richard Callicott in the Pequot War (1636–38). Sassomon then helped the Puritan missionary John Eliot, who later printed the Bible in Algonquian, to learn the Massachusett language while learning more English from him.

In January 1675, Sassamon was ambushed and assassinated. A mixed jury of colonists and Indian elders convicted and executed three Wampanoag men for his murder. These events helped spark the conflict known as King Philip's War, in which the New England Colonies defeated the Wampanoag and ended armed resistance by the Native Americans of southeastern New England.

== Early life and education ==
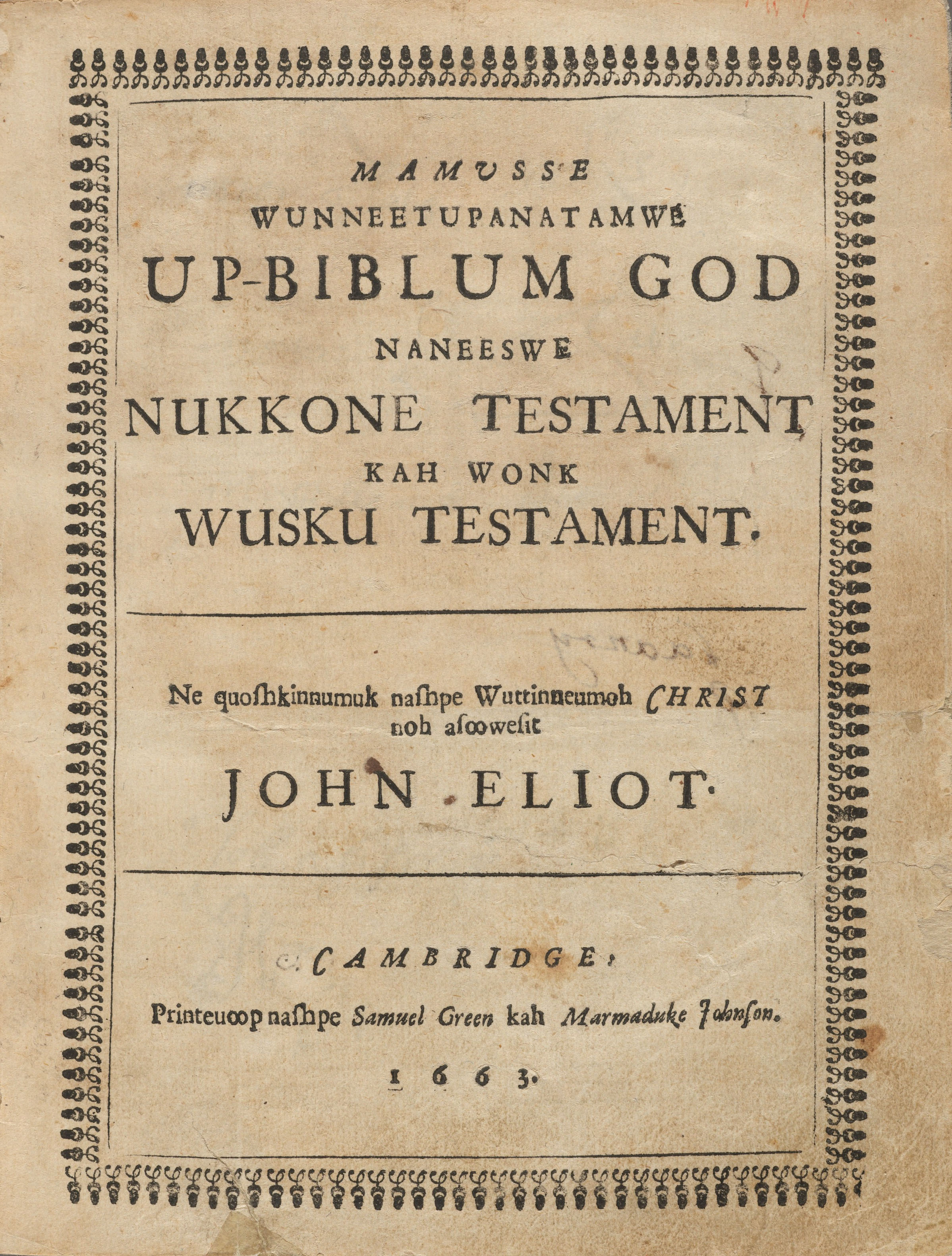
Sassamon worked with Puritan missionary John Eliot and assisted in the translation of the Bible into Algonquian.

John Sassamon was a member of the Massachusett tribe, born at the Massachuset, Punkapoag Plantation to Punkapoag parents. Historians believe that he was then raised in the home of Richard Callicot, where he may have been indentured along with the Indian translator Cockenoe. By his early teen years, he had been introduced to Christianity and learned to speak English. He is believed to have met and been mentored by the Christian missionary John Eliot during this period, and may have known and worked with him for as long as 40 years. Eliot mentioned the death of Sassamon in his diary.

By the Pequot War in 1637, a joint effort by colonists and Native American allies to suppress the Pequot in present-day Connecticut, Sassamon was skilled enough with the English language to serve as an interpreter for the colonists. He fought with them alongside Callicot in the service of Captain John Underhill. Following the war, Sassamon began to teach Eliot the Indian language in exchange for learning English and the Christian way of life. In 1651, Eliot established Natick as the first praying town. Praying towns were reserved for Native Americans who had converted to Christianity and were willing to live according to European-style customs in permanent agricultural settlements. Eliot recruited Sassamon as one of two schoolmasters to teach both English and Christianity to the residents.

Because of Sassamon's intelligence and ability to speak English, Eliot arranged for Sassamon to take classes at Harvard College for a year in 1653, before Harvard founded a special "Indian College". He may have studied alongside young Puritan men such as Increase Mather, Samuel Bradstreet, and John Eliot, Jr.

== Assassination ==
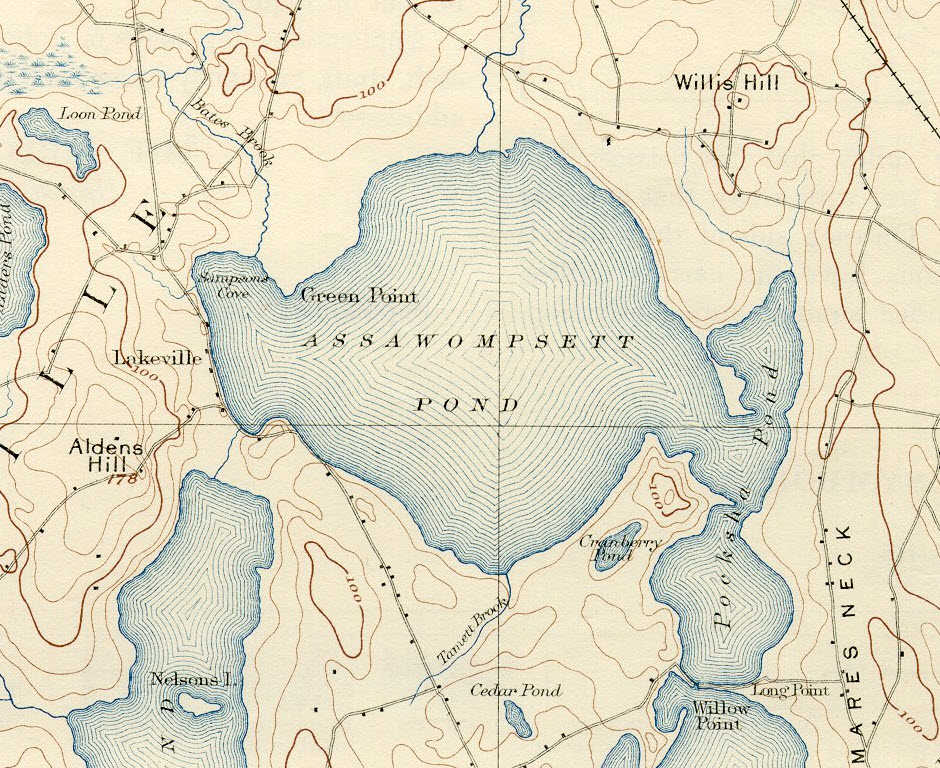
Assawompsett Pond in a map from 1893.

In late January 1675, Sassamon journeyed from Namasket, a Praying town where he ministered, to Plymouth to inform Josiah Winslow, the governor of the Plymouth Colony, about an impending attack being planned by Metacomet (King Philip), sachem of the Wampanoag, warning him that "Philip... was Indeavouring to engage all the sachems round about in a warr". Sassamon also told Winslow he believed he was in danger, that Philip would assassinate him if it were discovered that Sassomon had betrayed Philip. The Puritans did not take the information seriously "because it had an Indian original, and one can hardly believe them when they speak the truth" nor did they provide Sassamon with protection. Soon afterward, Sassamon was reported missing. In February 1675, his body was discovered in Assawompset Pond.

At first, the Puritans thought that he had drowned by accident while fishing. However, further examination suggested that he was murdered because his neck was broken, most likely from a violent twisting. In February, Philip appeared before the Plymouth General Court voluntarily to address Sassomon's allegations against him, and "upon a large debate", the Council decided there was "great reason to believe that the information against him might be in substance true" but, for lack of evidence and "hopeing that the discovery of it soe farr would cause him to desist they dismissed him frindly". For the matter of Sassomon's killing, the Plymouth Court interrogated "many Indians" on March 1 during its regular meeting, without results. Additional evidence came soon after the meeting was adjourned, from the Christian convert Patuckson, who testified to having seen three of Metacomet's men kill Sassamon and put him in the icy pond.

At its next regular meeting on June 1, 1675, the Plymouth General Court charged and tried the three Wampanoag Indians identified for the murder of Sassamon: Tobias, Wampapaquan, and Mattashunnamo—three of Philip's chief counsilors. This trial was the first in Plymouth to include a mixed jury, with twelve English colonists and six "of the most indifferentest, gravest, and sage" Indian elders. The jury found the three men guilty of murdering Sassamon, and they were sentenced to death and executed on June 8.

Historians have proposed various reasons for why the Wampanoags would have murdered Sassamon. Possible reasons include revenge for his having told the colonists about war plans or disapproval of his conversion and efforts to evangelize to other natives. Behind the varying explanations, as the historian Jill Lepore writes, is Sassamon's position as "cultural mediator", a man who was considered "neither English nor Indian, but negotiated with both peoples."

== Aftermath ==
Following the trial, tensions between both sides increased as they were becoming increasingly distrustful and frustrated with one another. The Puritans became more concerned about Metacomet's aggression and military strategies. The Wampanoags, who maintained the innocence of their three men, were outraged that the Puritans had prosecuted them. Metacomet in particular did not trust the colonists when it came to legal decisions concerning the Indians.

Even before the verdict was given, both the Massachusetts Bay Colony and Metacomet's tribe were mobilizing their forces for war. Fighting broke out later in June when the Wampanoags began attacking colonists in the Plymouth town of Swansea.

== Significance ==
As a Massachusett who could both speak and write English, Sassamon had a unique role in 17th-century New England society. He had close relations with both Puritans and Indians and was considered elite in both societies. He was powerful in each settlement, where his position as a teacher was highly valued. To the Puritans, Sassamon had embodied the success of their conversion efforts and assimilation of Indians into colonial society. The Wampanoags relied on him as a crucial link between themselves and the Puritans. Ultimately, he came to embody the fundamental discord between the Wampanoags and the Puritans. His position outside each society represented the underlying irreconcilable differences and distrust between the two.

== Bibliography ==
- Drake, James D. King Philip's War: Civil War in New England, 1675-1676. Amherst, Massachusetts: University of Massachusetts Press, 1999.
- Kawashima, Yasuhide. Igniting King Philip's War: The John Sassamon Murder Trial. Lawrence, Kansas: University Press of Kansas, 2001.
- Leach, Douglas Edward. Flintlock and Tomahawk: New England in King Philip's War. The Norton Library. New York: Norton, 1966.
- Lepore, Jill. "Dead Men Tell No Tales: John Sassamon and the Fatal Consequences of Literacy." American Quarterly Volume 46 Number 4 (1994): 479-512.
- Lepore, Jill. The Name of War: King Philip's War and the Origins of American Identity. 1st ed. New York: Knopf, 1998.
- Melvoin, Richard L. New England Outpost: War and Society in Colonial Deerfield. New York: Norton, 1989.
- Salisbury, Neal. "Introduction: A World Upended." In The Sovereignty and Goodness of God, 21. Boston, MA: Bedford/St. Martin's, 1997.
- Eliot's Journal
