= Cutshamekin =

Native American leader

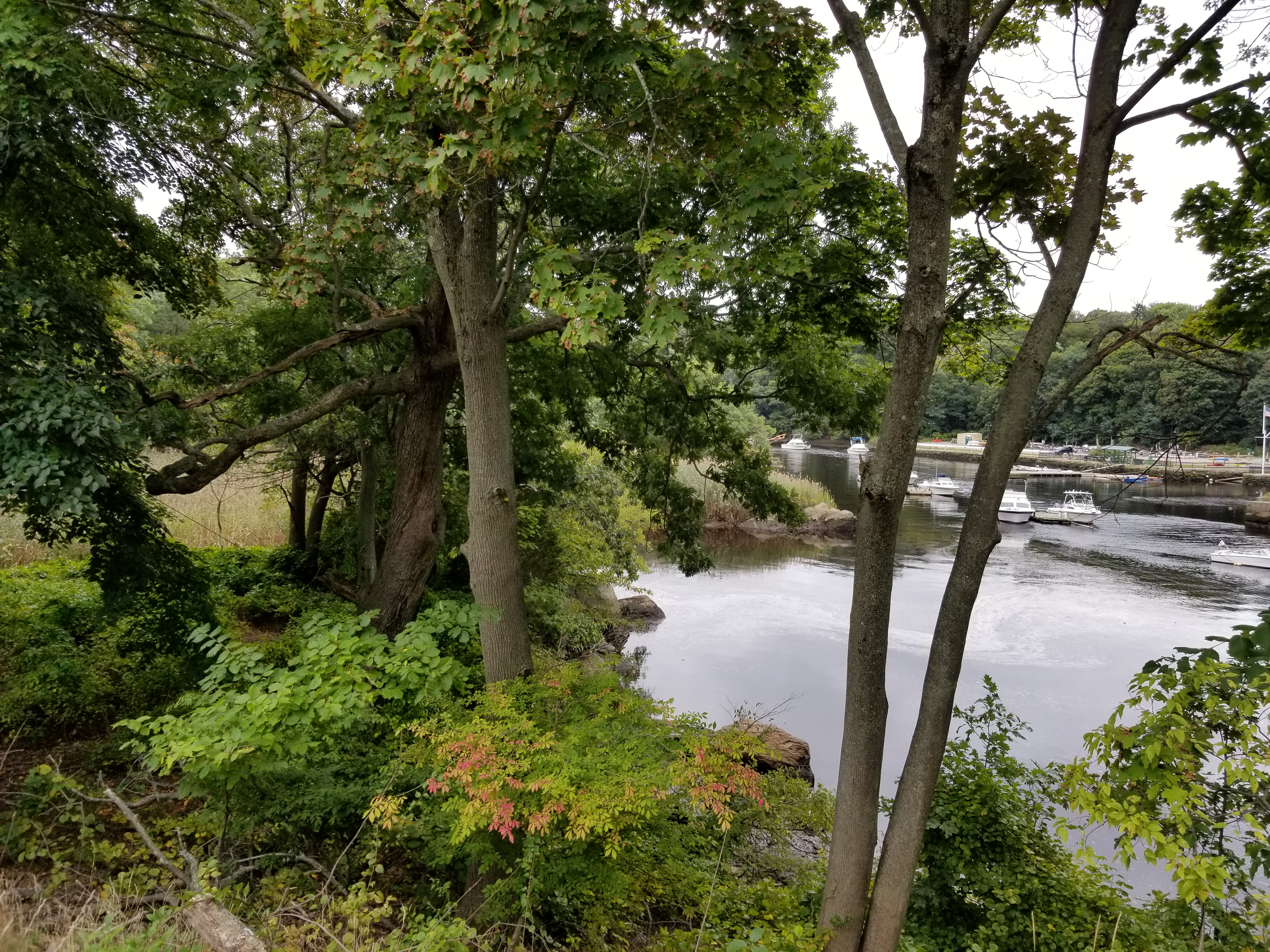
Park of Cutshamekin's last retained land in Dorchester, now part of the Neponset River Reservation near Ventura Playground and Lower Mills

Cutshamekin (died in 1654) (also spelled Kitchamakin, Kuchamakin, or Cutshumaquin) was a Native American leader, who was a sachem of the Massachusett tribe based along the Neponset River and Great Blue Hill in what is now Dorchester, Massachusetts and Milton, Massachusetts before becoming one of the first leaders of the praying Indian town of Natick, Massachusetts. He is the possible namesake of Jamaica Plain.

Cutshamekin was the brother of sachems Chickatawbut and Obtakiest who both died in 1633 during a smallpox outbreak which decimated many of the Native Americans in the area. In the 1630s, Cutshamekin sold much of the tribal land that he controlled around the Neponset River, including deeding what is now Milton, Massachusetts to Richard Callicott, with the exception of 40 acres reserved near the Neponset River near Dorchester Mills including what is now Dorchester Park and the Ventura Playground in the Neponset River Reservation. By selling much of the tribe's land, Cutshamekin isolated many of his followers. In 1643/44, Cutshamekin agreed that he and four other sachems from as far away as Mount Wachusett would sign a formal treaty with Governor John Winthrop submitting to the Massachusetts Bay Colony's authority in return for defense from their enemies. In 1646 the missionary John Eliot preached his first missionary sermon to Cutshamekin and his followers at their wigwam near Israel Stoughton's grist mill and Richard Callicott's trading post near what is now Dorchester, Lower Mills. Cutshamekin and his followers did not receive Eliot's first sermon positively, but Eliot continued to meet with Cutshamekin and his followers every other week with some success. In 1647, Cutshamekin's son was accused of drunkenness in Nonantum, and he accused his father of the same, but both publicly repented. By 1651 Cutshamekin had joined the Praying Indians of Natick as their leader, but had some issues with the smaller tributes paid by the Praying Indians. Cutshamekin died in 1654 and was buried on his remaining 40 acres of land in Dorchester "in a ceremony fitting a sachem: on tree branches around his mound grave were draped his wealth of furs." After Cutshamekin's death in 1654, he was succeeded by his nephew, Josias Wampatuck, who Cutshamekin had helped raise. Some historians theorize that "Jamaica Plain" was named after Cutshamekin and that "Jamaica", though a different letter "A" pronunciation, is an Anglicization of the name of Kuchamakin, who was regent for the young Chickatawbut, sachem (chief) of the Massachusett tribe.
