= Seal of Newton, Massachusetts =

Official insignia of the city

- Armiger: Newton, Massachusetts
- Adopted: 2025 (current form)
- Earlier version(s): 1865

The seal of Newton, Massachusetts is the official insignia of the city of Newton, Massachusetts.

The former seal was adopted in 1865, prior to Newton gaining city status. The insignia faced controversy for its representation of Native Americans. On February 18, 2025, Newton approved a new seal design to respond to the criticism it faced, and on March 17, 2025, adopted a revised City Ordinance describing this new design.

== Design ==
=== Current seal ===
The design of the seal of Newton, Massachusetts is defined by the City of Newton Ordinances, revised 2025:

The following shall be the device of the corporate seal of the city: A representation within a circle of Newton City Hall, a tree, and a body of water, and around the same the words: “Massachusetts”; and in an outer band the words: “City of Newton: Liberty and Union: 1688: Thirteen Villages.” (Rev. Ords. 2025, § 1-8) State law reference—Municipal seals, G.L. c. 40, § 47 Sec. 1- 9. Documents to be sealed. All deeds and other legal documents made, given or entered into by the city, requiring a seal, shall be sealed with the city seal. (Rev. Ords. 1973, § 1-9) Sec. 1-10. Custodian of seal. The city clerk shall be the custodian of the city seal. (Rev. Ords. 1973, § 1-10)

— City of Newton Ordinances, revised 2025

The design of the seal of Newton Massachusetts features Newton City Hall and War Memorial as its main feature. It places the seal within an outer band and adds a black line around the image itself. It includes Newton's motto "Liberty and Union", as well as the words "City of Newton", "Massachusetts", and "Thirteen Villages". It highlights the year 1688, when Newton became an independent township. It includes a tree which echoes the former seal and amplifies Newton's nickname "The Garden City". It features bushes in front of city hall as an additional natural element. It features the color orange, chosen as it is a common color of both Newton North High School and Newton South High School. There are two official versions of the seal, color and monochrome.

=== 1865 seal ===
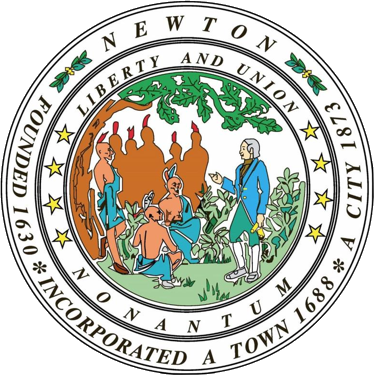
Former seal (1865–2025)

The design of the former seal of Newton, Massachusetts was defined by the City of Newton Ordinances, revised 1973:

The following shall be the device of the corporate seal of the city: A representation within a circle of John Eliot preaching to a group of Indians and around the same the words: "Liberty and Union" and "Nonantum;" and in an outer circle the words: "Newton: Founded 1630: Incorporated a Town 1688: A City 1873." (Rev. Ords. 1973, § 1-8) State law reference—Municipal seals, G.L. c. 40, § 47 Sec. 1- 9. Documents to be sealed. All deeds and other legal documents made, given or entered into by the city, requiring a seal, shall be sealed with the city seal. (Rev. Ords. 1973, § 1-9) Sec. 1-10. Custodian of seal. The city clerk shall be the custodian of the city seal. (Rev. Ords. 1973, § 1-10)

— City of Newton Ordinances, revised 1973

== History ==
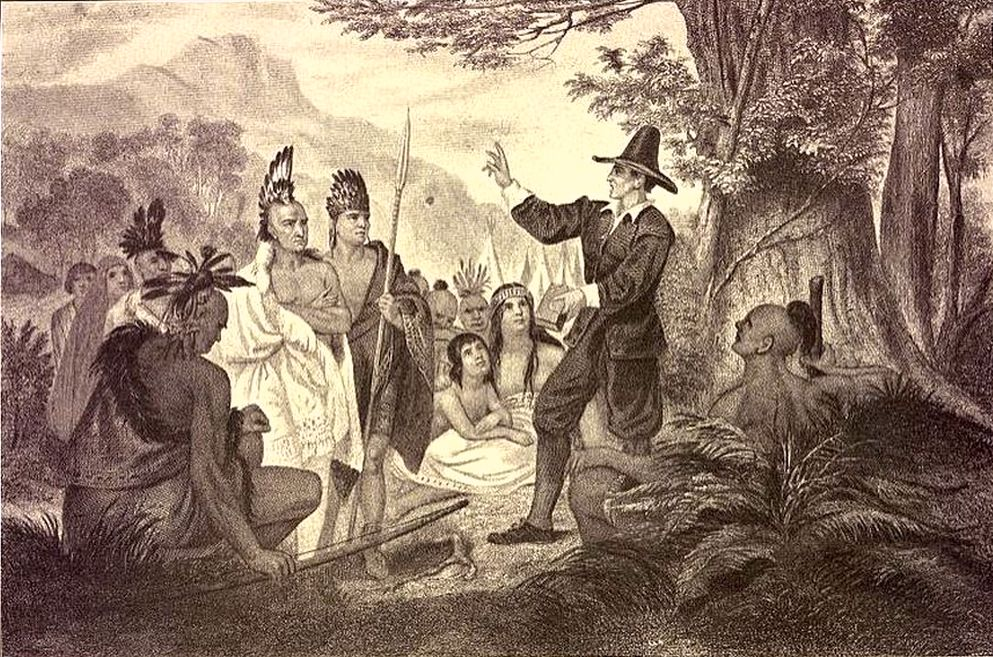
The scene of John Eliot among the Native Americans.

The former seal was adopted in 1865 by a Board of Selectmen, prior to Newton gaining city status. The central image featuring the city seal — a scene of Reverend John Eliot preaching to Native Americans in 1646 — was unmodified from 1874 or 1865 until 2025. The designer of the seal is unknown, although, in the 1860s, numerous depictions of John Eliot preaching the Massachusett tribe existed and could have inspired the design. The words ''Union'' and ''Liberty'' topping the central image — serving as motto — possess unclear origins. However, since the seal was adopted following the American Civil war, the word ''Union'' might have had a special meaning for the American people.

In 2020, Newton's mayor Ruthanne Fuller created an Ad Hoc City Seal Working Group to study the seal and make recommendations on its future use. In 2022, the working group stated the seal was historically inaccurate, and advocated for its replacement. The representation of Massachusett tribe members, including leader Waban, listening to a sermon by English missionary John Eliot in 1646, was deemed offensive to Native Americans. In 2024, a citywide survey was launched to select from three draft alternatives created by Sebastian Ellington Ebarb Design.

During a February 3, 2025 meeting, the final proposal by Ebarb Design was shown to city officials, based on input from the three draft survey. On February 18, 2025, the full Newton city council voted to approve the change to the new seal. On March 17, 2025, the full Newton city council adopted a revised City Ordinance describing the 2025 seal design.
