= Alexander Quapish =

Wampanoag veteran of the American Revolution

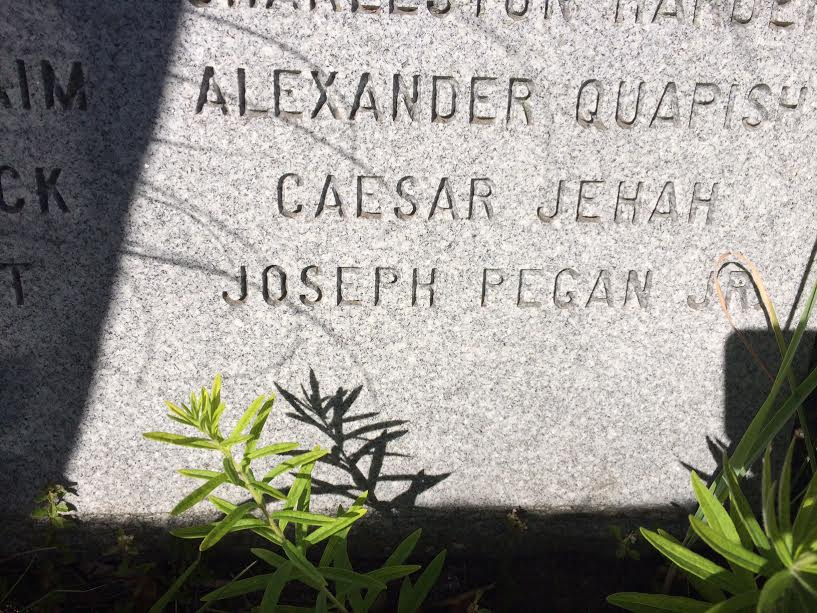
- A closeup on the Praying Indian Memorial in Natick showing Quapish's name.
- Born: c. 1741; Yarmouth, Massachusetts
- Died: March 23, 1776
- Spouse: Sarah David
- Military career
- Rank: private
- Unit: 13th Massachusetts Regiment
- Conflicts: Battle of Bunker Hill

Alexander Quapish (circa 1741 – March 23, 1776), also known as Alexander Quabish, (Note: His name is recorded variously in the historical record as: Qualish, Quapes, Quapish, Queppish.) was a Wampanoag veteran of the American Revolution.

== Personal life ==
Quapish was born circa 1741 in Wampanoag territory in Yarmouth, Massachusetts. He moved to Dedham, Massachusetts, and married Sarah David, a Christian Indigenous woman from that community in 1767, having filed his intention to do so on October 27. (Note: When Sarah died in 1774, she was buried at the ancient Indian burial ground near Wigwam Pond. She was said to be the last person buried there. The area has since been converted into athletic fields and a commercial shopping space.) He may have moved to Dedham because both Yarmouth and Dedham were associated with groups of Christian Indians. Both Sarah and Quapish were known as the "last Indian" in Dedham.

Quapish and Sarah had at least one child, a daughter named Alice. No lineal descendants were known to exist as of 2020, however.

== Revolutionary War ==
Quapish enlisted in Dedham as a private in the 13th Massachusetts Regiment on May 8, 1775, shortly after both Sarah's death and the Battles of Lexington and Concord. His company was commanded by Captain Daniel Whiting and Colonel Jonathan Brewer.

In June, he fought at the Battle of Bunker Hill. On July 3, 1775, he was selected to serve on the main guard under Lt. Col. Loammi Baldwin. His name appears on both the August and October rolls of the company, and an order for a bounty coat was dated Prospect Hill on 22 December 1775.

== Death and initial burial ==
In November 1775, Quabish became ill. He was taken to the Needham Leg (Note: The Leg was an area located just north of what is now Natick Center, roughly bordered by Bacon Street to the south, Route 9 to the north, Morse’s Pond to the east, and Lake Cochituate to the west.) home of 14-year-old Michael Bacon, with whom he camped in Cambridge during the Battle of Bunker Hill. He was cared for by the Bacons beginning on November 15, 1775, and died there on March 23, 1776, of unknown causes. At the time, Needham Leg, known today as South Natick, was predominantly an Indian enclave.

Bacon's father, Michael Bacon, Sr., then petitioned the Great and General Court for compensation for caring for Quapish and then burying him. The elder Bacon's petition was endorsed by three Needham selectmen, and accompanied by a bill of £6, 8s. of which eight shillings were for a coffin, and three shillings for "Diging his Grave."

Where Quapish was buried is not entirely clear. It is likely he was buried in the Pond Street Burial Ground in Natick, Massachusetts. (Note: At least 17 Native American veterans of the Revolution were buried there.) He may also have been buried in Dedham or Needham.

== Warren Anatomical Museum ==
In 1856, Quapish was disintered from Dedham by Henry Jacob Bigelow of the Warren Anatomical Museum at the Harvard School of Medicine. The records are not clear how his remains ended up in Dedham, or when. The only records in the museum describe him as "Qualish, the last of the Indian tribe at Dedham, Mass.; was buried in 1774; aet. 68."

In 1990, the Congress passed the Native American Graves Protection and Repatriation Act (NAGPRA) and Quapish's remains were turned over to the federal government. Of more than 1,000 sets of remains, Quapish's were the only to which NAGPRA researchers, the Warren Museum, and the Peabody Museum of Archaeology and Ethnology were able to attach a name. In accordance with the law, representatives of three Wampanoag-affiliated tribes, the Mashpee Wampanoag Tribe, Wampanoag Tribe of Gay Head, and the Assonet Band of the Wampanoag Nation, were contacted about taking possession of the remains.

== Reburial ==
After Quapish was identified, the tribes then determined where his final resting pace would be. The Natick Selectmen voted just before Thanksgiving 2020 to allow the burial in what is now known as the Natick Praying Indian Burial Ground on Pond Street, which is town-owned. In December 2020, members of the Mashpee Wampanoag and Nipmuc Nations led a ceremony in which Quapish's remains were reburied in the Pond Street Burial Ground. The ceremony was officiated by Chief Caring Hands of the Natick Praying Indians.

== Legacy ==
In 2010, the National Park Service shared a YouTube video, narrated by students from the Clarence R. Edwards Middle School, telling Quapish's story. The film was funded in part by a grant from the National Park Foundation. Several years after that, the Needham Cares sculpture outside of Needham High School references Quapish's stay at the Bacon's home and the care he received there in his final days.

In Dedham, Quabish Road is near the site where Sarah was buried.
