= New England Company =

British missionary society

New England Company Society for the Propagation of the Gospel in New England
- Company for Propagation of the Gospel in New England and the parts adjacent in America
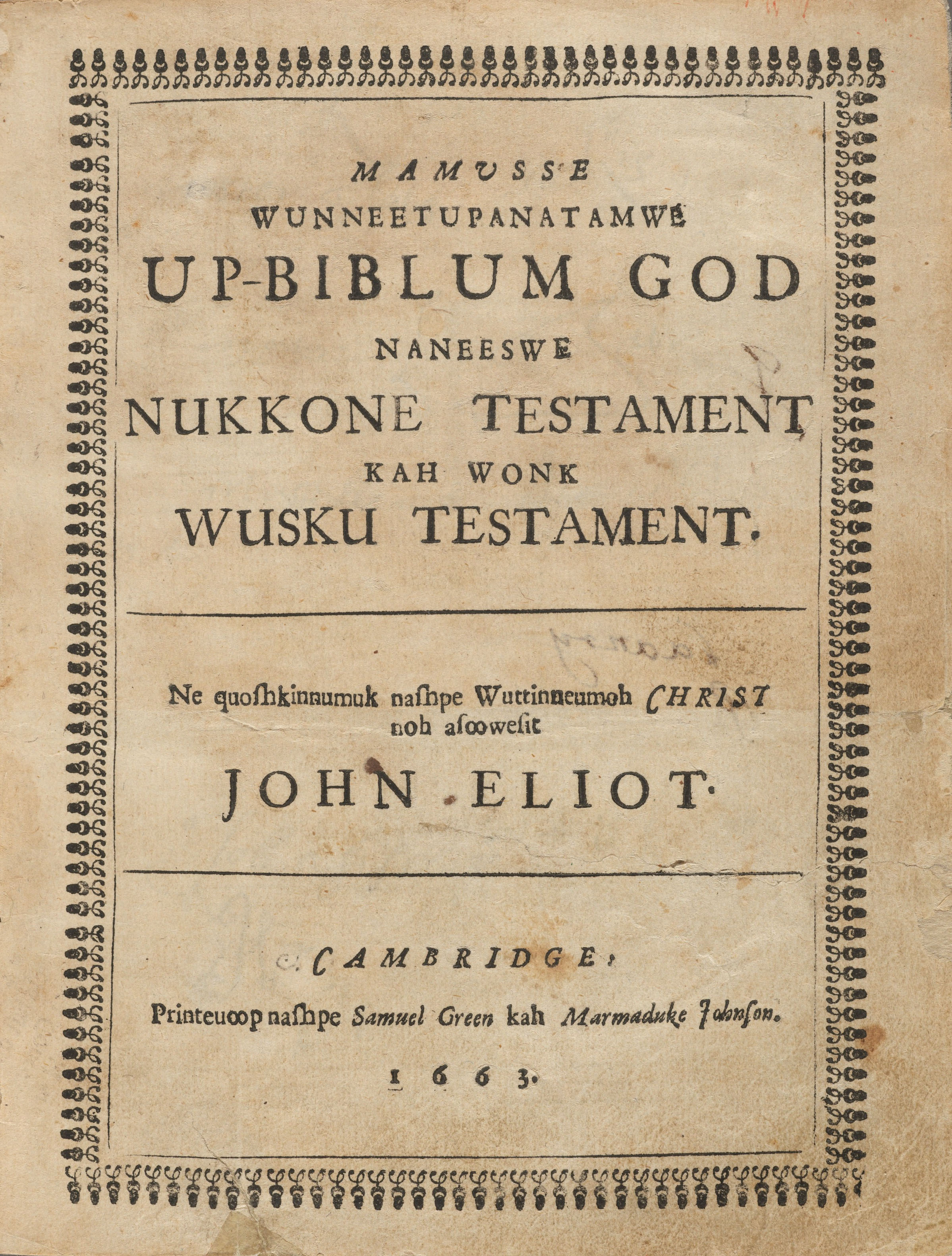
- The Eliot Indian Bible, published in 1663 as the first Bible printed in North America, was published with the support of the Society.
- Formation: Original founding: 1649; Royal charter: 1662; 364 years ago
- Legal status: Charity
- Purpose: Missionary work Religious education
- Headquarters: Bolney, West Sussex, United Kingdom
- Region served: Historical: New England and British North America; Current: Canada; West Indies
- President: Robert Boyle (first)
- Key people: Nick Wells (Chair)
- Website: newenglandcompany.org

The Society for the Propagation of the Gospel in New England (also known as the New England Company or Company for Propagation of the Gospel in New England and the parts adjacent in America) is a British charitable organization created to promote Christian missionary activity among the Native American peoples of New England and other parts of North America under British control. The company's current website states that "the New England Company can lay claim to being the oldest missionary society still active in Britain." The records of the New England Company, now held at London Metropolitan Archives, tell the history of colonial America and its Indigenous peoples.

It was founded by the Act for the promoting and propagating the Gospel of Jesus Christ in New England, passed by Oliver Cromwell's Parliament on 27 July 1649. That Act set up a Corporation in England, consisting of a President, a Treasurer, and fourteen people to assist them. This corporation had the power to collect money in England for missionary purposes in New England. This money was received by the Commissioners of the United Colonies of New England and dispersed for missionary purposes. The official name of the corporation was "The President and Society for the propagation of the Gospel in New England".

Following the restoration of the English monarchy, the Society was granted a Royal Charter by Charles II in 1662. That charter provided for the promotion and propagation of "the Gospel of Christ unto and amongst the heathen natives in or near New England and parts adjacent in America". The Society was engaged in protestantism and colonization in Restoration politics.

The Society operated within the territory of what is now the United States from 1649 to 1786, sending both missionaries and teachers to New England and later also to Virginia and New York. Due to the independence of the United States from Great Britain, after 1786 the Society continued to operate only in Canada and the British West Indies.

The Society supported the early efforts of John Eliot in Massachusetts, culminating in the first printed translation of the Christian Bible into a Native American language. The corresponding book, known as the "Eliot Indian Bible", was published in 1663 in the Massachusett language. The Society also played a critical role in funding and supporting institutions that sought to educate Native Americans, including the Harvard Indian College and later Dartmouth College.

The first president of the Society was the eminent Anglo-Irish scientist Robert Boyle (1627–1691). Boyle, who had no direct descendants, stated in his will that his legacy should be dedicated to "the Advance or Propagation of the Christian Religion amongst Infidells". After a prolonged dispute among his executors it was decided that the legacy would be used to purchase Brafferton Estate in Yorkshire, and that the proceeds of that estate would be used to pay "a rent-charge in perpetuity of £90 per annum unto the Company for Propagating the Gospel in New England".
