= Job Nesuton =

Job Nesuton (died 1675) was a Native American translator who translated large parts of the Eliot Indian Bible, the first Bible printed in America.

Job Nesuton was a Massachusett active in John Eliot's mission to the Indians of the Massachusetts Bay Colony. After meeting Eliot in Nonantum in 1646, by 1651 Nesuton became a teacher in Natick, Massachusetts, one of the Praying towns that Eliot had established for the Masschusett people of Nonantum. After the departure of Cockenoe, Nesuton became one of the primary translators (along with Cockenoe and James Printer) for Eliot's Bible translation project which was completed in 1663. While serving as a translator for the English forces during King Philip's War, Nesuton was killed in 1675.
