= Cockenoe =

17th century Native American translator

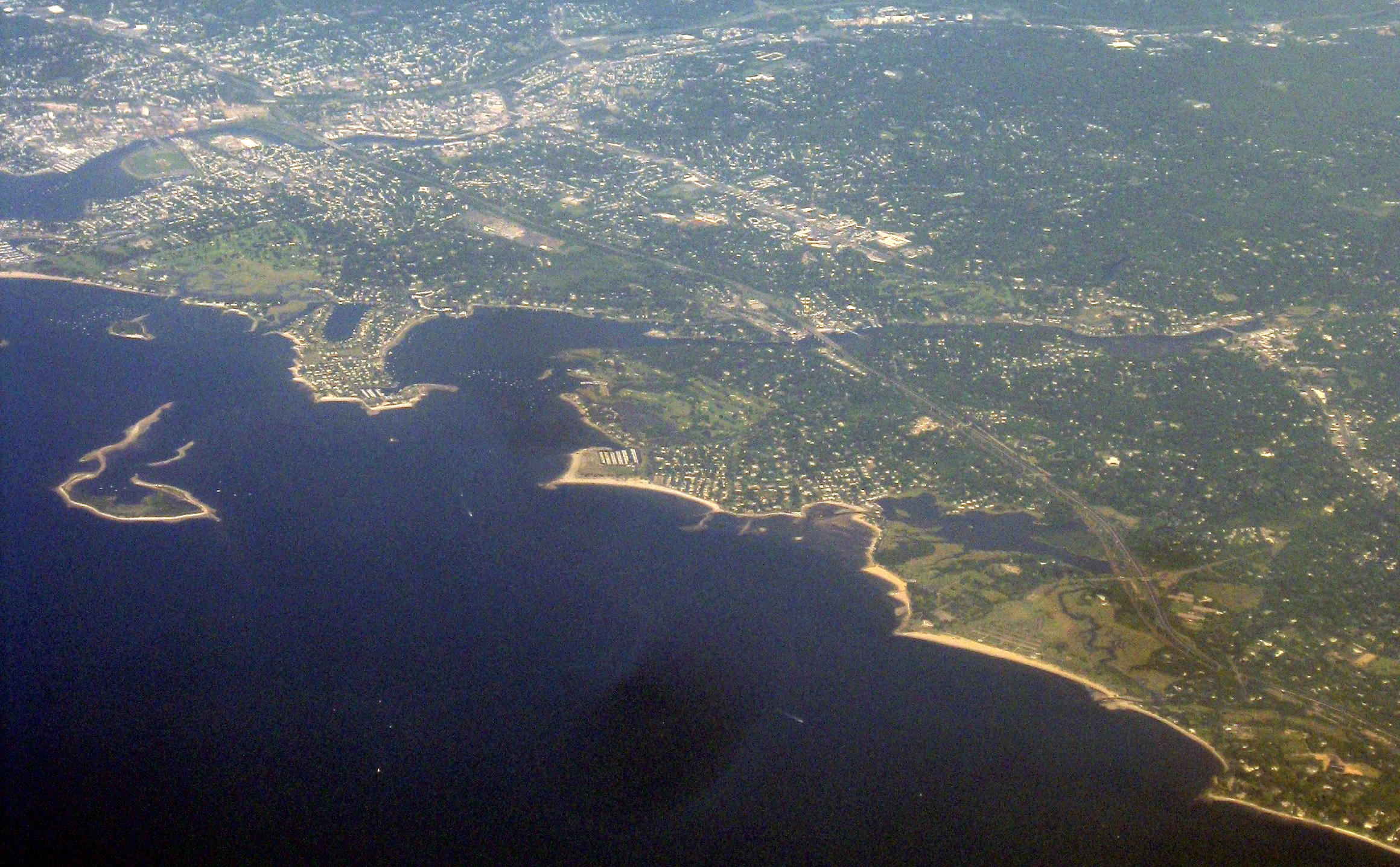
Cockenoe and Sherwood Islands in Long Island Sound

Cockenoe (also known as Cockeno, Cockenow, Chachaneu, Cheekanoo, Cockenoe, Chickino, Chekkonnow, Cockoo) (born before 1630 and died after 1687) was an early Native American translator from Long Island in New York where he was a member of the Montaukett. He helped to translate the earliest parts of the Eliot Indian Bible, the first Bible published in America.

In 1637 Cockenoe was captured during the Pequot War by a Massachusetts militia unit. After being captured and brought back to Massachusetts, Cockenoe became a servant to Richard Callicot, a fur trader, in Dorchester, Massachusetts. John Sassamon, a prominent Native American translator, also grew up as a servant in Callicot's household in Dorchester. Similarly, Cockenoe became an early American translator and interpreter, and one of the first people who mastered English and several Algonquian languages, including the Massachusett language. Cockenoe helped translate the Eliot Indian Bible, the first Bible printed in America. John Eliot stated that Cockenoe assisted Eliot in translating "the Commandments, the Lords Prayer, and many Texts of Scripture: also I compiled both exhortations and prayers by his help." At some point between 1646 and 1649, shortly after Eliot began preaching, Cockenoe returned to the Long Island area where he served as an interpreter for many land transactions between local tribes and colonists. In 1667 he married "“Sunksquaw” of the Shinnecock; "a female Sachem, the sister of Nowedonah" or possibly "Wyandanch." Cockenoe died after 1687 when his name last appears in the records in a Montauk deed.

There is currently a Cockenoe Island (pronounced "kuh-KEE-nee") near the Connecticut shore in the Norwalk Islands of Long Island Sound named after him.
