= John Eliot (missionary) =

Puritan missionary to the American Indians

The Reverend John Eliot
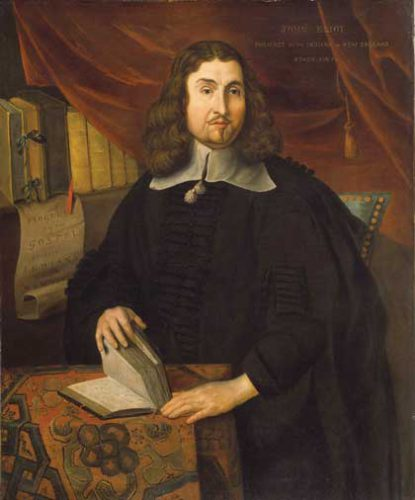
- Born: 1604; Widford, Hertfordshire, England
- Died: 21 May 1690 (aged 85–86); Roxbury, Massachusetts Bay Colony, British America
- Occupations: Puritan missionary, and religious teacher to American Indians

John Eliot (c. 1604 – 21 May 1690) was a Puritan missionary to Native Americans who some called "the apostle to the Indians", and the founder of Roxbury Latin School in the Massachusetts Bay Colony in 1645. In 1660 he completed the enormous task of translating the Eliot Indian Bible into the Massachusett language, producing more than two thousand completed copies.

== Early life and education ==
Cuckoos Farm, Little Baddow, Eliot's home around 1629

Eliot was born in Widford, Hertfordshire, England, and lived at Nazeing as a boy. He attended Jesus College, Cambridge. After college, he became assistant to Thomas Hooker at a private school in Little Baddow, Essex. After Hooker was forced to flee to the Netherlands, Eliot emigrated to Boston, Massachusetts, arranging passage as chaplain on the ship Lyon and arriving on 3 November 1631. Eliot became minister and "teaching elder" at the First Church in Roxbury.

From 1637 to 1638, Eliot participated in both the civil and church trials of Anne Hutchinson during the Antinomian Controversy. Eliot disapproved of Hutchinson's views and actions, and was one of the two ministers representing Roxbury in the proceedings which led to her excommunication and exile.

In 1645, Eliot founded the Roxbury Latin School. He and fellow ministers Thomas Weld (also of Roxbury), Thomas Mayhew of Martha's Vineyard, and Richard Mather of Dorchester are credited with editing the Bay Psalm Book, the first book published in the British North American colonies (1640). From 1649 to 1674, Samuel Danforth assisted Eliot in his Roxbury ministry.

=== Roxbury and Dorchester, Massachusetts ===
There are many connections between John Eliot and the towns of Roxbury and Dorchester. After working for a short time as pastor in Boston as the temporary replacement for John Wilson at Boston's first church society, John Eliot settled in Roxbury with other Puritans from Essex, England. He was the teacher at The First Church in Roxbury for sixty years and was their sole pastor for forty years.

For the first forty years in Roxbury, Eliot preached in the 20-foot by 30-foot meetinghouse with thatched roof and plastered walls that stood on Meetinghouse Hill. Eliot founded the Roxbury Grammar School and worked hard to keep it prosperous and relevant. Eliot also preached at times in the Dorchester church; he was given land by Dorchester for use in his missionary efforts. In 1649 he gave half of a donation he received from a man in London to the schoolmaster of Dorchester.

=== Use of the Massachusett language ===
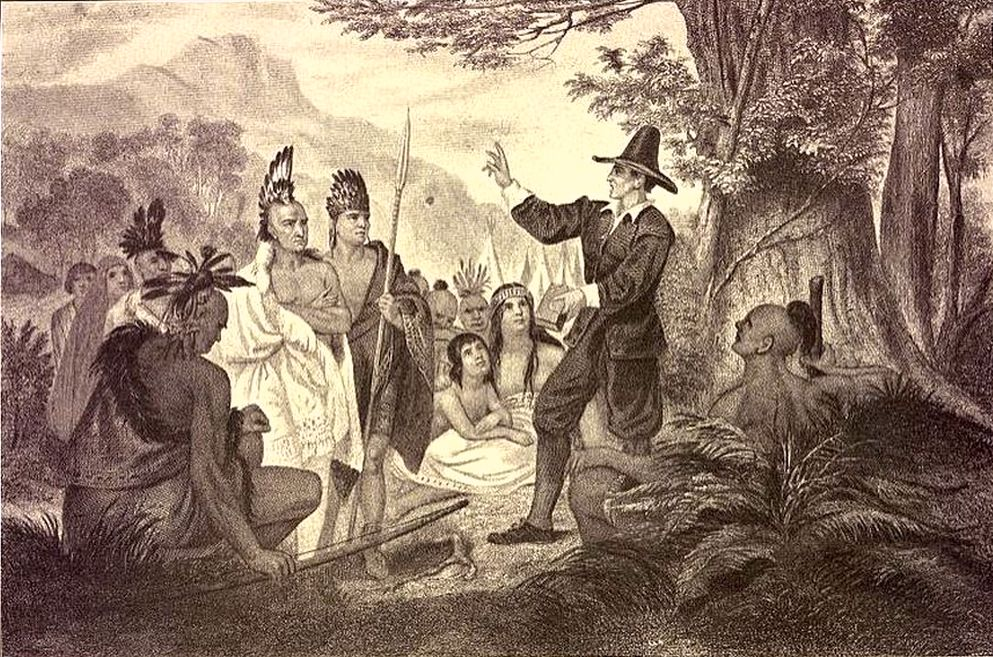
John Eliot among the Indians

The chief barrier to preaching to the Native Americans was language. Gestures and pidgin English were used for trade but could not be used to convey a sermon. John Eliot studied the Massachusett or Wampanoag language, the language of the local Indigenous population. To help him with this task, Eliot relied on a young Native American named Cockenoe. Cockenoe had been captured in the Pequot War of 1637 and made the servant of an Englishman named Richard Collicott. John Eliot said, "he was the first that I made use of to teach me words, and to be my interpreter." Cockenoe could not write, but could speak Massachusett and English. With his help, Eliot was able to translate the Ten Commandments, the Lord's Prayer and other scriptures and prayers.

In 1660, Eliot translated the Bible from English to Massachusett, and had it printed by Marmaduke Johnson and Samuel Green on the press in Cambridge, Massachusetts. By 1663, Marmaduke and Green had printed 1,180 volumes of the Old and New Testaments translated from English to the Massachusett language.

The first time Eliot attempted to preach to the Massachusett (led by sachem Cutshamekin) in 1646 at Dorchester Mills, he failed, saying that they "gave no heed unto it, but were weary and despised what I said." The second time he preached to Native Americans was at the wigwam of Waban near Watertown Mill, which was later called Nonantum, now Newton, Massachusetts. John Eliot was not the first Puritan missionary to try to convert Native Americans to Christianity, but he was the first to produce printed publications for the Algonquian people in their own language. This meant that the settlements of "praying Indians" could employ other preachers and teachers to continue the work John Eliot started. By translating sermons to the Massachusett language, John Eliot not only disseminated Christianity to local Native Americans, but also introduced written language; Massachussett did not have a written alphabet of its own, mainly employing spoken language and pictorial language.

== Missionary career ==
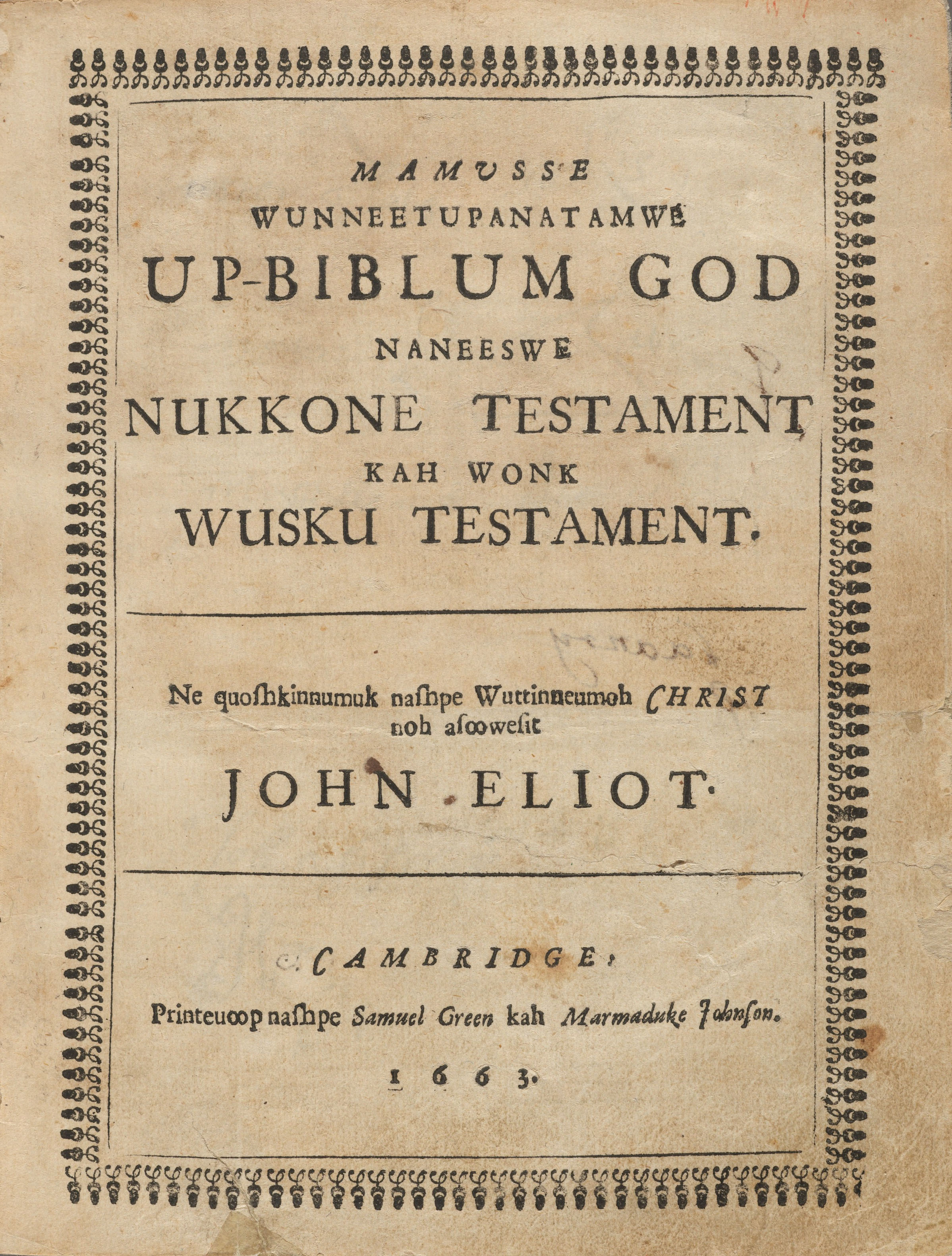
Mamusse Wunneetupanatamwe Up-Biblum God (1663) or the Eliot Indian Bible, the first Bible printed in British North America

Eliot's ministry largely focused on the conversion of Massachusett and other Algonquian peoples. Accordingly, Eliot translated the Bible into the Massachusett language and published it in 1663 as Mamusse Wunneetupanatamwe Up-Biblum God. It was the first complete Bible printed in the Western hemisphere; Samuel Green and Marmaduke Johnson printed 1,000 copies on the first printing press in British American colonies. Indigenous people including the Nipmuc leader James Printer (Wowaus) engaged in the creation of this Bible.

In 1666, Eliot published "The Indian Grammar Begun", again concerning the Massachusetts language. As a missionary, Eliot strove to consolidate the Algonquians in planned towns, thereby encouraging them to recreate a Christian society. At one point, there were 14 towns of so-called "Praying Indians", the best documented being at Natick, Massachusetts. Other praying Indian towns included: Littleton (Nashoba), Lowell (Wamesit, initially incorporated as part of Chelmsford), Grafton (Hassanamessit), Marlborough (Okommakamesit), a portion of Hopkinton that is now in the Town of Ashland (Makunkokoag), Canton (Punkapoag), and Mendon-Uxbridge (Wacentug). The "Praying Towns" were recorded by seventeenth-century settlers including Daniel Gookin.

In 1662, Eliot witnessed the signing of the deed for Mendon with Nipmuck people for "Squinshepauk Plantation". Eliot was involved in the legal case, The Town of Dedham v. The Indians of Natick, which concerned a boundary dispute. Besides answering Dedham's complaint point by point, Eliot argued that the colony's purpose was to benefit the Algonquian people.

Praying Indian towns were also established by other missionaries, including the Presbyterian Samson Occom, himself of Mohegan descent. All praying Indian towns suffered disruption during King Philip's War (1675), and for the most part lost their special status as Indigenous self-governing communities in the course of the 18th and 19th centuries, in some cases being paid to move to Wisconsin and other areas further West.

Eliot also wrote The Christian Commonwealth: or, The Civil Policy Of The Rising Kingdom of Jesus Christ, considered the first book on politics written by an American, as well as the first book to be banned by a North American governmental unit. Written in the late 1640s, and published in England in 1659, it proposed a new model of civil government based on the system Eliot instituted among the converted Indians, which was based in turn on the government Moses instituted among the Israelites in the wilderness (Exodus 18).

Eliot asserted that "Christ is the only right Heir of the Crown of England," and called for an elected theocracy in England and throughout the world. The accession to the throne of Charles II of England made the book an embarrassment to the Massachusetts colony. In 1661 the General Court forced Eliot to issue a public retraction and apology, banned the book and ordered all copies destroyed.

In 1709, a special edition of the Massachusett Bible was co-authored by Experience Mayhew and Thomas Prince, with the Massachusett text in one column and the English text in the opposite column. The 1709 Massachusett Bible is also referred to as the Massachusett Psalter. This edition is based on the Geneva Bible, like the Eliot Indian Bible.

== Family ==
Coat of Arms of John Eliot

John Eliot married Hanna Mumford in September 1632, the first entry in the "Marages of the Inhabitants of Roxbury" record. They had six children: five sons and one daughter. Their daughter Hannah Eliot married Habbakuk Glover. Their son, John Eliot Jr., was the first pastor of the First Church of Christ in Newton, Another son, Joseph Eliot, became a pastor in Guilford, Connecticut, and later fathered Jared Eliot, a noted agricultural writer and pastor. John Eliot's sister, Mary Eliot, married Edward Payson, founder of the Payson family in America, and great-great-grandfather of the Rev. Edward Payson. He was also an ancestor of Lewis E. Stanton, a United States attorney for the District of Connecticut. He is related to the Bacon family.

== Death ==
Eliot died in 1690, aged 85, his last words being "welcome joy!" His descendants became one branch of a Boston Brahmin family. The historic cemetery in Roxbury, Massachusetts, was named Eliot Burying Ground.

== Legacy ==
Natick remembers Reverend Eliot with a monument on the grounds of the Bacon Free Library. The John Eliot Elementary School in Needham, Massachusetts, founded in 1956, is named after him. Puritan "remembrancer" Cotton Mather called his missionary career the epitome of the ideals of New England Puritanism. William Carey considered Eliot alongside the Apostle Paul and David Brainerd (1718–1747) as "canonized heroes" and "enkindlers" in his An Enquiry Into the Obligation of Christians to Use Means for the Conversion of the Heathen (1792).

In 1689, he donated 75 acres (30 ha) of land to support the Eliot School in what was then Roxbury's Jamaica Plain district and now is a historic Boston neighborhood. Two other Puritans had donated land on which to build the school in 1676, but boarding students especially required support. Eliot's donation required the school (renamed in his honor) to accept both Black and Native American students without prejudice, which was very unusual at the time. The school continues near its original location today, but now offers classes for all ages.

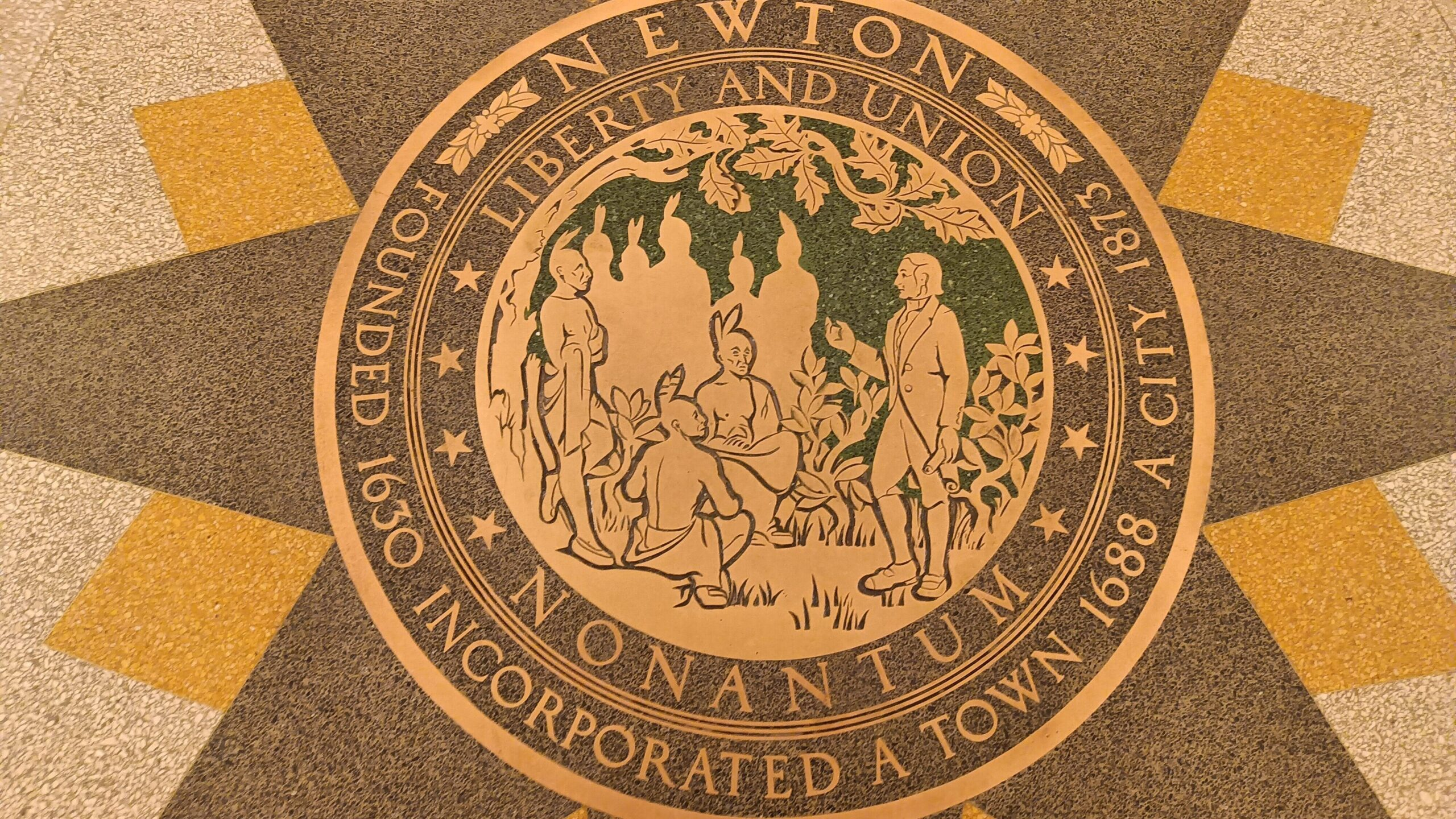
City Seal of Newton, Massachusetts, depicting John Eliot

The city seal of Newton, Massachusetts depicts Eliot preaching to an Indigenous audience. Present-day Newton is the site of Eliot’s first sermons to the Natives in Waban’s wigwam among what would be later called the Nonantum Indian community, starting on October 28, 1646. A nineteenth-century monument commemorates the event on Eliot Memorial Road, Newton.

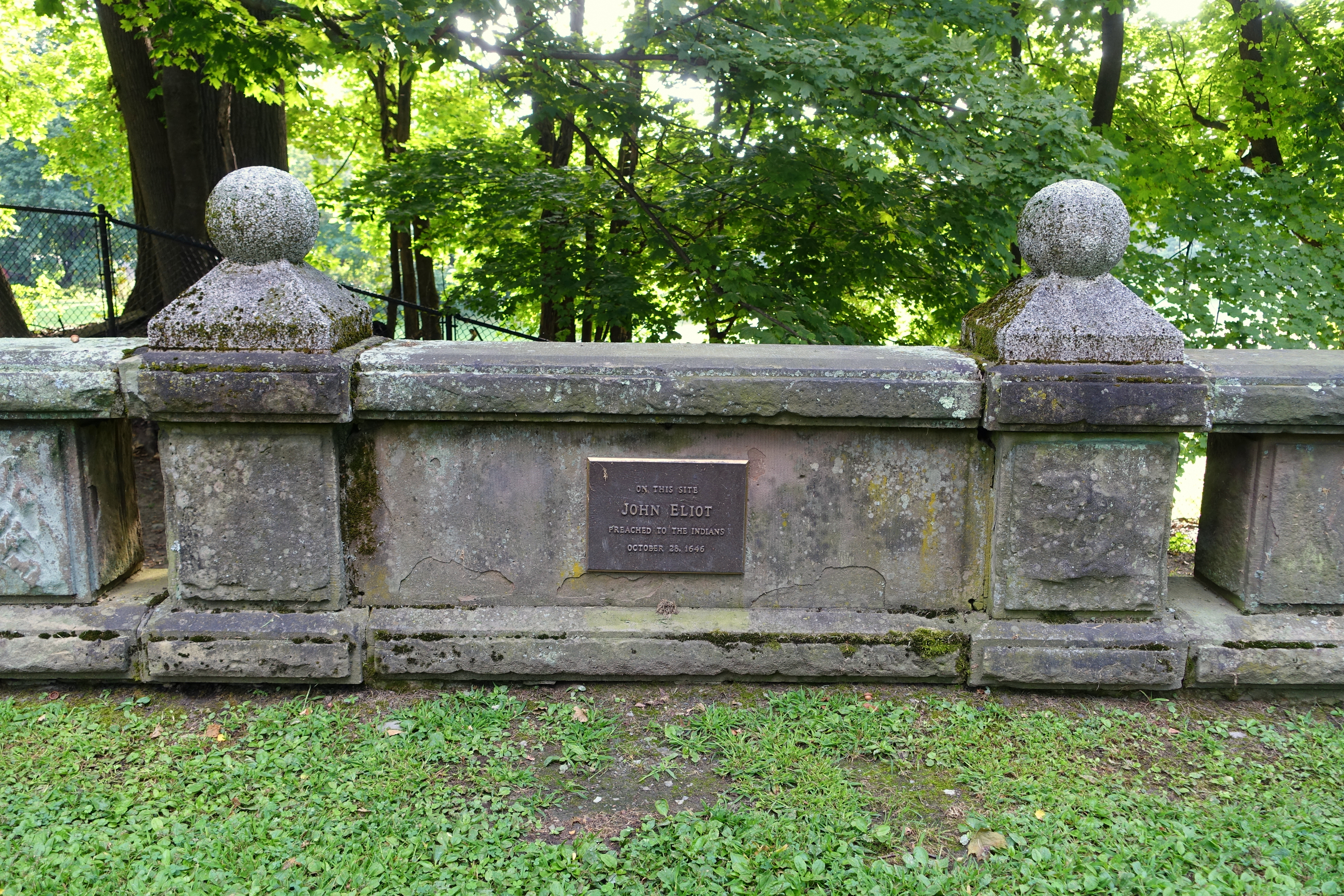
John Eliot Memorial, Nonantum, Newton

The town of Eliot, Maine, which was in Massachusetts during its incorporation, was named after John Eliot.

Eliot appears in the alternate history 1632 Series, in the novel 1637: The Coast of Chaos. In the novel, his wife is killed shortly after the birth of their first child by French soldiers invading the Thirteen Colonies. A group of time travelers bring a book about the world they come from that allows Eliot to read about how much of his works were undone by his fellow colonists; he then sets out to alter his missionary efforts in a manner that will prevent Native American converts from being vulnerable to the treachery they faced in the old timeline.

== Works ==
- trans., The Book of Genesis, 1655.
- trans., The Psalter, 1658.
- The Christian Commonwealth: or The Civil Policy Of The Rising Kingdom of Jesus Christ, 1659 Librivox audio
- A Christian Covenanting Confession, 1660.
- trans., Wusku Wuttestamentum Nullordumun Jesus Christ (New Testament), 1661.
- trans., Mamvsse Wunneetupanatamwe Up-Biblum God (The Holy Bible containing the Old Testament and the New), 1663, rev. ed. 1685.
- The Indian Grammar Begun, 1666.
- The Logic Primer, 1672.
- The Harmony of the Gospels in the holy History of the Humiliation and Sufferings of Jesus Christ, from his Incarnation to his Death and Burial, 1678.
- Nehtuhpeh peisses ut mayut, A Primer on the Language of the Algonquian Indians, 1684.

Eliot Tracts

- New Englands First Fruits; in respect, First of the Conversion of some, Conviction of divers, Preparation of sundry of the Indians, 1643
- The Day-Breaking, if not the Sun-Rising of the Gospel with the Indians in New-England, 1647
- The Clear Sun-shine of the Gospel breaking forth upon the Indians in New-England, 1648
- The Glorious Progress of the Gospel, amongst the Indians in New England, 1649
- The Light appearing more and more towards the perfect Day, 1651
- Strength out of Weaknesse; or a Glorious Manifestation of the further Progresse of the Gospel among the Indians in New-England, 1652
- Tears of Repentance: Or, A further Narrative of the Progress of the Gospel Amongst the Indians in New-England, 1653
- A Late and Further Manifestation of the Progress of the Gospel amongst the Indians in New-England, 1655
- A further Accompt of the Progresse of the Gospel amongst the Indians in New-England and of the means used effectually to advance the same, 1659
- A further Account of the progress of the Gospel Amongst the Indians In New England, 1660
- Brief Narrative of the Progress of the Gospel amongst the Indians in New England, in the Year, 1670, 1671

== See also ==
- John Eliot Square District
