= Lifestyles of early settlers of Dedham, Massachusetts =

The lifestyles of early settlers of Dedham, Massachusetts were marked by a simple, agrarian life. Dedham was, by design, "a self-contained social unit, almost hermetically sealed off from the rest of the world." There was little disparity of wealth, and even the richest among the townsfolk still typically worked their own land, possibly with the assistance of a few servants.

== Life in England ==
All the inhabitants shared "a latent spirit of rejection for the England they left behind." For some, it was primarily about religion, while others had economic, social, or political concerns.

England in the 17th century was mired in civil and social unrest. The cloth industry in East Anglia, whence many settlers hailed, was in a depression. The harvest failed three times in the decade preceding Dedham's founding and the plague was sweeping across the country. Poverty was rampant in England and society could not support the sheer numbers of poor and orphaned subjects. The colonies in North America were seen as a way to relieve some of the excess population pressure. Early settlers to New England also began sending back propaganda to the mother country encouraging others to emigrate.

== Land distribution ==
The first settlers obtained title to the land from the Wampanoag people in the area for a small sum and began parceling out tracts of land. Thomas Bartlett was ordered to begin surveying the land at their very first meeting. By 1639, however, Bartlett had stopped performing the work, for which he was not paid, and a year later he sold his holdings in Dedham and left town.

Each man received tiny houselots in the village with additional strips of arable land, meadow, and woods. Each strip was located in a common field and the community decided which crop to grow and how to care for and harvest it. The common field method brought men into regular contact with one another and prevented farms from being established far from the village center.

The land was given sparingly, with no family given more land than they could currently improve. Married men received 12 acres, four of which were swamp, while single men received eight, with three acres being swampland. Lands were also awarded in return for service to the church and the community, a practice that had long been established by the General Court.

Land was distributed according to several criteria. The first was the number of persons in the household. Servants were considered a part of a freeman's estate. Land was also given according to the "rank, quality, desert and usefulness, either in church of commonwealth" of the proprietor. Finally, it was thought that men who were engaged in a trade other than farming should have the materials needed to work and those who were able to improve more land should have that fact taken into account.

Families had to clear the land before they could build their homes on it. To avoid the problem's England was facing due to deforestation, clapboards were originally not allowed. However, the clay used to insulate homes would quickly deteriorate in the weather, and soon clapboards were allowed to be cut and used.

Twenty years after it was founded, only three percent of the land had been distributed, or 3,000 acres, with the rest being retained by the town. This was a deliberate choice not to award huge homesteads as happened in other towns, such as in Watertown. In 1657, there was still 125,000 acres remaining to be distributed to settlers.

Between 1656 and 1667, however, over 15,000 acres were allotted to townsmen. During the first 50 years of Dedham's existence, any man who lived there for 25 years could expect to receive between 50 and 500 acres, with 150 acres being the average. It was not a huge farmstead, but it afforded a degree of security to each family and allowed the next generation, including younger sons, to inherit enough land to have a successful farm of their own. It also made each farmer a potential yeoman. As early as 1690, much of the best land had already been claimed and a dividend in that year had to be canceled because the land was not worth the price of surveying.

First generation farmers could expect to pass on about 150 acres of land to their heirs. Second generation farmers could expect to pass on that much or even more between their inheritances and the dividends awarded by the town. As the generations grew, third generation farms in the early 1700s were about 100 acres. By the end of the 1700s, farmers could expect to inherit only about 50 acres of land, a plot not large enough to support a family.

== Farming ==
Except for the lots where homes were built, all the land cultivated was in a common field. A common tillage field of 200 acres was laid out in 1643 and each man was assigned a specific length of fence to build to enclose it. As there is no record of clearing the land, it was probably used previously by the native population. Each man was also assigned a plot of land within the field to cultivate. Residents grew corn, beans, peas, and pumpkin. Later residents who acquired larger plots of land planted wheat, rye, barley, and oats.

On what was then called Dedham Island (today Riverdale) and along East Street were common feeding lands, or herd walks, for cattle, goats, and pigs. Another pasture was leased from Israel Stoughton along the banks of the Neponset River.

== Insularity ==
Dedham attracted people that tended to stay rather than be transitory. Less than two percent of townsmen arrived in any given year and less than one percent left. Because of the low geographic mobility, the town became "a self-contained social unit, almost hermetically sealed off from the rest of the world." From 1648 to 1688 the number of family names in town decreased from 63 to 57. By this time a majority of residents could trace their ancestry back to one of 30 families who had been in Dedham since before 1648. This stability was a "typical, persistent, and highly important feature of Dedham's history." A century after settlement, immigration and emigration were still rare. Of every 10 men born in Dedham between 1680 and 1700, eight would die there. Perhaps no more than 10% left voluntarily, and they were typically wealthier and better connected.

Both the town and its inhabitants tried to avoid using the provincial court system. A man could expect to be involved in a civil suit no more than once in his life and criminal proceedings were virtually nonexistent. Land transactions in the 1600s were almost always between neighbors, or occasionally with someone in another town if the land in question was on the border.

While the settlers recognized the authority of the General Court they did not always follow its laws. Their taxes to the colony, which were usually half of what their assessment from the town, were always paid.

By 1681, residents were supposed to inform the selectmen of any worker who was expected to stay in town for more than two weeks, though the law was largely ignored.

=== Exclusionary votes ===
==== 1630s ====
From its earliest days, Dedham was closed off to all unless the current residents explicitly welcomed someone in. Shortly after the town was incorporated, in November 1636, a loophole was closed to ensure that those who were not committed to the same ideals were not admitted as townsmen. The Town Meeting voted not to allow any land sales unless the buyer was already a resident of the town, or was approved by a majority of the other voters. Those who violated the law would have all their land confiscated.

The next year, on August 11, 1637, a total of 46 house lots had been laid out and it was voted to stop admitting new residents. As colonial law required all homes to be located close to one another, the town needed time to determine where new residents could be accommodated.

Just prior to the vote, however, several men who would have outsized influence on the future of the town would be admitted. They include John Allin, Michael Metcalf, Eleazer Lusher, and 9 others. The Town also voted to invite Peter Prudden and 15 or more of his followers to join them, but since Dedham was not geographically situated to become a center of commerce the invitation was declined.

==== 1657 ====
Two decades after the plantation was begun, those who had done the hard work of first settling the land were worried that, as the town's population grew, their dividends of land would be diluted. On January 23, 1657, the growth of the town was further limited to descendants of those living there at the time. Newcomers could settle there, so long as they were like-minded, but they would have to buy their way into the community. Land was no longer freely available for those who wished to join.

All those currently living in the town would be awarded common rights based on their tax assessment. For every £18 they were assessed, residents were granted one cow common right. Each cow common right could be divided into 5 goat or sheep common rights. That provided for 447 common rights within the town and would serve as the basis for all new land distributions. When 22 townsmen felt they had not received a fair number of rights, an arbitration committee awarded them an additional 25, which were added to the original 447.

Henry Phillips, a former selectman, was so upset by his allotment that he took off and moved to Boston. Though he had received "better than average" dividends of land, he led a group of dissatisfied settlers in a rare public complaint. He brought his complaint before the General Court, which was an action even more rare in a community whose covenant called for disputes to be resolved by local mediation. Court appointed arbitrators awarded Phillips six additional cow commons. His co-litigants also got six additional cow commons and two sheep commons, and the church was awarded eight additional cow commons as well.

=== Early departures ===
Four of the original proprietors, John Coolidge, Thomas Hastings, Thomas Bartlett, and Robert Feake, never made the move from Watertown to Dedham and quickly sold off their land holdings. Of those who did move to Dedham, several left fairly early on, though the reasons why are not always clear. Ezekiel Holliman almost certainly left for religious reasons after the arrival of the Allin party and the religious hard line they imposed on the church and the society. Timothy Dalton moved to Hampton to become the teaching officer in the church and he was soon followed by his brother, Philemon, along with Francis Austin, John Huggen, and Jeffery Mingey. (Note: The minister there, Stephen Batchelor, was a distant relation of Dedham's John Batchelor.)

Several moved to Weymouth. Abraham Shaw intended to move before his death, and his son Joseph did after selling off the remaining land holdings. In the next 12 months, Nicholas Phillips, Martin Phillips, Jonas Humphrey, John Rogers, and Ralph Shepard would all move there with him. Not everyone sold off their land in Dedham, however, and some were absentee landlords for many years after leaving town. With dissenters having moved on, there was an "aura of peace" that settled over the town for a generation.

Roughly a third of the early settlers would live in three different towns around New England in their lifetimes, but geographic mobility was much lower from 1650 to 1750.

== Wealth ==
With a small population, a simple and agrarian economy, and the free distribution of large tracts of land, there was very little disparity in wealth. Early residents had largely the same lifestyle and standard of living.

The 5% of men who paid the highest taxes during early years only owned 15% of the property. In contrast, the wealthiest 5% of men in nearby Boston controlled 25% of that town's wealth. No nobles or gentlemen settled in the town and impoverished "laborers" were so rare in a town with free land were nearly nonexistent. Even those who were able to garner slightly more wealth still lived the same lifestyle as those with less, including working their own fields.

In the early days anyone who might be considered poor was likely to be a sick widow, an orphan, or "an improvident half-wit." In 1690, the poorest 20% of the population owned about 10% of the property.

At least 85% of the population were farmers or, as they called themselves, "yeoman" or "husbandman." There were also those who served the farmers, including millers, blacksmiths, or cordwainers. Like in the English countryside, they were largely subsistence farmers who grew enough for their families but did not specialize in any cash crops or particular animals.

The first homes were all fairly similar, built with boards and stone fireplaces and chimneys. The hip roofs were covered with thatch. The first floor would have a living room and kitchen, and sleeping quarters could be reached by ladder in the garret above. One resident inventoried his belongings of the "needful things as every planter doth, or ought to provide to go to New England:" one iron pot, one kettle, one frying pan, one grid iron, two skillets, one spit, and wooden platters, dishes, spoons, and trenchers.

Later homes typically consisted of two to eight rooms with a few beds, chests, and chairs. Each person may own two changes of clothes plus a good suit or cloak, and a family may have a little silver or pewter. They typically would own a Bible, pots, pans, bowls, and bins. Outside of the house, in the barn or lean-to, would be agricultural tools and a few bushels of crops. For animals, one or two horses along with several cattle, pigs, and sheep were common.

== Labor ==
Single people, including adult children of residents, were not allowed to live alone unless they had sufficient resources to set up their own household with servants. Each year, one day was set aside to assign young adults to other households as subordinates. The practice was intended to both keep up the family labor system that underpinned the local economy, and was to prevent the "sin and iniquity ... [that] are the companions and consequences of a solitary life."

The family labor system also kept young adults in their family homes longer than they might otherwise have been. Town and colony policies kept the value of a child's labor very high. Records show that children in Massachusetts Bay Colony whose fathers died early, leaving them an inheritance and thus the means to start their own households, married sooner than those whose parents lived longer. Nearly two-thirds of orphaned children married before the age of 25, compared to less than half of those with two living parents.

A 1693 colonial law allowed for outside labor to come into towns without their employers having to post prohibitively expensive bonds for them. If they remained in town for longer than three months without being "warned out" by the selectmen, they could remain as an inhabitant. The colony raised the limit from three months to one year in 1700. Once warned out, an individual could be thrown out of town at any time or treated as a vagabond. Some stayed after being warned out. Others left on their own will or were thrown out. Many, however, were never warned out, especially children.

=== Specialized labor ===
In the last three decades of the 17th century, a shoemaker, bricklayer, and tanner were recruited to move to the town.

Over the course of the 17th century, Dedham had two doctors living in the village. Dr. Henry Deengains moved to Dedham by 1638, but he soon left for Roxbury. Twelve years later, Dr. William Avery moved to town.

=== Servants ===
In 1681, there were 28 servants serving in 22 of the 112 households in town. Of them, all but four were children and 20 of the servants were white. There were ten boys, eight girls, two "Negro boys," two "Indian boys," one "lad," and one "English girl." There was also one man, one "Negro man," and two "maids." The servants in town, while they served in 20% of the households, made up only 5% of the population. Most of them soon became independent yeomen.

The importation of outside labor was rare, averaging about two people or families per year between 1650 and 1769. The selectmen allowed most, but not all, of the servants to stay for at least a year, but dictated the conditions by which they could stay.

Many of the children who lived in Dedham as servants may have been taken in partly out of charity. After King Phillip's War, there were a large number of orphaned children. With Dedham's strong ties to Deerfield, it is presumed that some of the children—white and Indian—were casualties of the war.

Servants were expected to be treated as members of the family. Residents did not want an outsider to come in to work for a specific family and then become a charity case that had to be supported by the entire town. Some households were required to post a bond for their servants. When the selectmen ordered them to go, Thomas Clap was forced to post his saw mill as security in case either of his maid servants should pose a charge to the town.

Upon the first accounting of all outside servants in 1681, a bond of £5 was usually set for white pre-pubescent children born in New England, £10 for foreign-born or enslaved children, and £20 for those old enough to bear children and create additional expenses for the town. There was no charge for families who promised to dismiss their child servants before they hit puberty. Those willing to adopt the children "as their own" did not have to pay a bond. White orphans of New England birth were cheaper because they could typically be expected to return to their home communities and families. Native children and those of African descent were likely to be enslaved, and thus to remain in town as adults, and thus higher bonds were required. The expense of adult servants made them rare, and held only by the wealthiest families.

Selectmen also had the authority to take children out of homes and put them to work in other households. If a household did not pay their full taxes, or if a household was not deemed efficient enough, children could be removed and placed in the homes of richer men. The "inconviencency and disorder" in Johyn MacCintosh's family, for example, was the basis for the selectman's order to MacCintosh to put one of his sons out to serve another family. When the father refused, the selectmen assigned the child to go to the home of Timothy Dwight.

== Works cited ==
- Hanson, Robert Brand (1976). Dedham, Massachusetts, 1635-1890. Dedham Historical Society.
- Lockridge, Kenneth (1985). A New England Town. New York: W.W. Norton & Company. ISBN 978-0-393-95459-3.
- Levy, Barry (1997). "Girls and Boys: Poor Children and the Labor Market in Colonial Massachusetts". Pennsylvania History: A Journal of Mid-Atlantic Studies. 64: 287–307. JSTOR 27774064.
- Brown, Richard D.; Tager, Jack (2000). Massachusetts: A concise history. University of Massachusetts Press. ISBN 978-1558492493.
- Smith, Frank (1936). A History of Dedham, Massachusetts. Transcript Press, Incorporated.
- Barber, John Warner (1848). Historical Collections: Being a General Collection of Interesting Facts, Traditions, Biographical Sketches, Anecdotes, &c., Relating to the History and Antiquities of Every Town in Massachusetts, with Geographical Descriptions. Lazell. pp. 455–463.
