= History of Dedham, Massachusetts, 1635–1699 =

The history of Dedham, Massachusetts, 1635–1699, begins with the first settlers' arrival in 1635 and runs to the end of the 17th century. The settlers, who built their village on land the native people called Tiot, incorporated the plantation in 1636. They sought to build a community in which all would live out Christian love in their daily lives, and for a time did, but the Utopian impulse did not last. The system of government they devised was both "a peculiar oligarchy" and "a most peculiar democracy." Most freemen could participate in Town Meeting, though they soon established a Board of Selectmen. Power and initiative ebbed and flowed between the two bodies.

The settlers then undertook the difficult task of establishing a church, drafting its doctrinal base, and selecting a minister. In early days nearly every resident was a member but, seeking a church of only "visible saints," membership declined over time. Though the "half-way covenant" was proposed in 1657 and endorsed by the minister, the congregation rejected it.

Population grew from about 200 people in early days to around 700 by 1700, with land being distributed according to rank and family size. Though it was given out sparingly in general, lands were also awarded in return for service to the church and the community. The town remained insular during the early years, with the community remaining self contained. With a small population, a simple and agrarian economy, and the free distribution of large tracts of land, there was very little disparity in wealth.

As the town grew, new towns broke off from Dedham, beginning with Medfield in 1651. With the division and subdivision of so many communities, Dedham has been called the "Mother of Towns." Of towns founded during the colonial era, Dedham is one of the few towns "that has preserved extensive records of its earliest years." This has enabled historians to date the Fairbanks House as the oldest tinder house in America and Mother Brook as the first man-made canal in Colonial America. It also established the Dedham Public Schools as the first public school in the country.

== Incorporation ==
In 1635 there were rumors in the Massachusetts Bay Colony that a war with the local native people was impending and a fear arose that the few, small, coastal communities that existed were in danger of attack. This, in addition to the belief that the few towns that did exist were too close together, prompted the Massachusetts General Court to establish two new inland communities. On May 6, 1635, the General Court granted permission to residents of Watertown to set off and establish new towns. One group, led by Rev. Thomas Hooker, left and founded Hartford, Connecticut and another, led by Simon Willard, left to found Concord, Massachusetts. Together, Dedham and Concord helped relieve the growing population pressure and placed communities between the larger, more established coastal towns and the Indians further west.

It was not until the following March, however, that the General Court ordered that the bounds of what would become Dedham be mapped out. The committee appointed to do so reported back in April, but the date the grant was awarded to the original proprietors has been lost to history. The original grant was for about 3.5 square miles (9.1 km^{2}) on the northeast side of the Charles River, including what is today Newton and land on the other shore that makes up roughly half of present-day Dedham, Needham, Westwood, and Dover. The order came after twelve men (Note: Including John Kingsbury.) petitioned the General Court for a tract of land south of the Charles River.

Those men, plus seven others, (Note: These men included the original twelve and John Kingsbury, John Hayward, John Rogers, Auston Francis, Daniel Morse, Joseph Morse, John Ellis, Ezekiel Holliman, and Thomas Bartlet, Thomas Hastings, John Huggen, William Bearstow and Abraham Shaw.) made a second petition on August 29, 1636, for additional land on both sides of the river. One of the additional men was Robert Feake, the husband of Elizabeth Fones, the widow of John Winthrop's son, Henry. Feake only ever attended three meetings, all of them in Watertown, and there is no record that he ever set foot in Dedham. He was presumably recruited for his political influence and was granted a farm lot in addition to his house lot in return.

Neither the settlers nor the General Court knew exactly how much land they were requesting, or granting. The petition was for all the land south of the Charles River, but maps from the early 1630s show the river ending somewhere near modern-day Dedham. It had never been explored by colonial settlers beyond that point. Instead, the colony gave them over "two hundred square miles of virgin wilderness, complete with lakes, hills, forests, meadows, Indians, and a seemingly endless supply of rocks and wolves." There were a number of surveys undertaken over the years, beginning with one in 1638 undertaken by John Rogers and Jonathan Fairbanks, but the issue was not settled until the United States Supreme Court took up a case in 1846 that involved a dispute between the border of Massachusetts and Rhode Island.

In the second petition, the settlers asked the General Court to incorporate the plantation into a town, and to free the town from all "Countrey Charges," or taxes, for four years and from all military exercises unless "extraordinary occasion require it." The General Court granted only a three-year reprieve from taxes.

They also asked to "distinguish our town by the name of Contentment" but when the "prosaic minds" in the Court granted the petition on September 7, 1636, they decreed that the "towne shall beare the name of Dedham." The earliest records of the settlement, before the General Court settled on Dedham, all use the name Contentment. Tradition holds that John Rogers or John Dwight, both signers of the petition seeking the establishment of the town, asked the Court to name it after their hometown in England of Dedham, Essex. "Contentment" eventually became the motto of the town. Many of the other yeomen settling the new Dedham in the Massachusetts Bay Colony came from Suffolk, in eastern England.

The original grant stretched from the southwestern border of what is today Boston but was then Roxbury and Dorchester to the Rhode Island and Plymouth Colony borders. To the west were ungranted lands. The less than 100 Indians who lived on the land sold it for a small sum. Early settlers gave places names such as Dismal Swamp, Purgatory Brook, Satan's Kingdom, and Devil's Oven.

== Landing and first settlement ==
The Algonquians living in the area called the place Tiot, which means "land surrounded by water." (Note: Tiot was later used to describe the village of South Dedham, today the separate town of Norwood.) Many of them had died prior to the settlers arrival due to disease contracted by contact with English settlers. The area near Wigwam Pond, however, was still a seasonal site for the local tribe, however. The settlers were not looking to establish wide tracks of land, however. They were looking to recreate an English country village, and believed that with a compact settlement and hundreds of acres of land, a peaceful co-existence with the native peoples was possible.

Dedham was settled in the summer of 1636 by "about thirty families excised from the broad ranks of the English middle classes," largely from Yorkshire and East Anglia. Only five signers of the covenant were university graduates, but many more would be called upon to serve the town, the church, and the colony. (Note: Those five were John Allen, Thomas Carter, Timothy Dalton, Samuel Morse, and Ralph Wheelock.) As Puritans, they came to Massachusetts in order to live and worship as they pleased.

They traveled up the Charles River from Roxbury and Watertown in rough canoes carved from felled trees. These original settlers, including Edward Alleyn, John Everard, John Gay and John Ellis "paddled up the narrow, deeply flowing stream impatiently turning curve after curve around Nonantum until, emerging from the tall forest into the open, they saw in the sunset glow a golden river twisting back and forth through broad, rich meadows." In search of the best land available to them they continued on but

The river took many turns, so that it was a burden the continual turning about. ... West, east, and north we turned on that same meadow and progressed none, so that I, rising in the boat, saw the river flowing just across a bit of grass, in a place where I knew we had passed through nigh an hour before. "Moore," said Miles then to me, "the river is like its Master, our good King Charles, of sainted memory, it promises overmuch, but gets you nowhere."

They first landed where the river makes its "great bend," near what is today Ames Street, and close by the Dedham Community House and the Allin Congregational Church in Dedham Square. The site is known as "the Keye," and in 1927 a stone bench and memorial plaque were installed on the site.

By March 1637, with homes built and fields planted, the settlers moved to their new village. The first town meeting held in Dedham was on March 23, 1636–37 and was attended by 15 men.

== Utopian commune ==
Like its surrounding communities, Dedham's early culture was much like the English villages where its original settlers were born and small agricultural communities all over Europe. A number of the customs and institutions in the town were direct transplants from contemporary English villages. However, as a settlement of English Puritans who escaped oppression to settle in the wilderness, "Dedham was peculiarly American."

It was originally intended to be a Utopian society along the lines of the later Amana Colonies, Oneida Community, and Brook Farm. In "its first years, the town was more than a place to live; it was a spiritual community." Its distinctive characteristics created what has been described as a "Christian Utopian Closed Corporate Community":

Christian because they saw Christian love as the force which would most completely unite their community. Utopian because theirs was a highly conscious attempt to build the most perfect possible community, as perfectly united, perfectly at peace, and perfectly ordered as man could arrange. Closed because its membership was selected while outsiders were treated with suspicion or rejected altogether. And Corporate because the commune demanded the loyalty of its members, offering in exchange privileges which could be obtained only through membership, not the least of which were peace and good order.

Each of the original settlers pledged to live out Christian love in their daily lives. Each was also expected to be united in this love as it was designed to bring about a deep and abiding peace throughout the whole community. Inquiries could also be made into the private lives of townsmen, and adjustments ordered when a resident's life was not as virtuous as the community felt it should be.

None who were not committed to this ideal were to be admitted as townsmen and, if the need arose, they were to be expelled. The commitment in the Covenant to allow only like-minded individuals to live within the town explains why "church records show no instances of dissension, Quaker or Baptist expulsions, or witchcraft persecutions." (Note: While there were no Quakers who lived in Dedham, there were others who were arrested while traveling through town and persecuted for their religious beliefs. They include Richard Dowdney and Elizabeth Hooten.) The Covenant was intended to extend beyond the lifetimes if those who wrote it and to be binding upon all residents in perpetuity.

The poor would be helped if they were residents of Dedham, but sent away if they were not. In addition to paying taxes, each man was expected to labor on communal projects several days each month. Every year, six days were set aside to work on roads and each man was expected to work four of them. Townsmen also took turns serving in a variety of low level offices, including constable, hog reeve, or fence viewer.

This did not mean communism as the settlers subscribed to the Puritan belief of a natural inequality among men as being divine providence. Still, the relative economic equality kept social rank to a minimum and helped maintain social harmony. Men could live their entire lives in this community among their equals and on their own land. This was, according to one commentator, the "plan of the society [John] Winthrop hoped to construct in Massachusetts was the plan of Dedham writ large."

=== Decline ===
The Utopian impulse did not last, however, and "the policies of perfection" no longer dominated just 50 years after the establishment of the community. By the 1640s the town began permitting residents to fence in their strips of land in the common field and, presumably, to grow whatever crop they wanted in it. By reducing and eventually eliminating the common field system, it reduced the number of interactions each farmer had with his neighbors and made one less decision they had to make and employ in common.

By about 1660, not every newcomer to town was invited to sign the Covenant making them "by implication second class citizens." Laws that restricted the presence of strangers were rarely enforced after 1675. (Note: During the early days of the settlement, the Selectmen voted to ask an Irishman and his wife, who were visiting friends, to leave town as soon as possible, presumably because they were Catholic.) Eventually, as some men grew richer, they were able to hire substitutes to serve in their place on communal projects or to serve in office for them.

Also around this time evidence of the "loving spirit" proclaimed in the Covenant "came to be conspicuous by [its] absence." Records of open dissent began appearing, first about seating placements in the meetinghouse. In 1674, people began sitting in places other than those assigned for them. This growing sense of egalitarianism did not sit well with some, and a committee was appointed to deal with those who sat in the seats assigned to others.

Some refused to meet with the committee and others were not happy with the decisions they made. With discontent lingering, Ruling Elder John Hunting was asked to speak to those involved. Hunting was not successful either, so the selectmen imposed a fine of five shillings on those who did not sit in their assigned seats with one-third of the fine going to those who reported an offender and the remainder going to the town. After Nathanial Bullard informed on a number of his fellow townsmen, he apparently appeared so obnoxious and greedy that the fine was repealed.

The number of yea and nay votes also began being recorded where previously decisions were made by consensus. As the century progressed, residents were also more likely to use the court system to settle disputes, which was previously unheard of, than they were to go use the arbitration method laid out in the covenant.

While Dedham was insulated to a great degree from the outside world in its early years, as time went on it was dragged into the greater society. One result was that, as residents began to see them as parts of a larger society, less emphasis was placed on the local community. In 1661, Richard Ellis refused to serve as Town Clerk, an action that would have been unthinkable just a decade before. When a committee dispatched to evaluate land granted in return for 2,000 acres given to the "praying Indians" of Natick submitted a bill for their expenses in 1663, it was a sign that the days of performing community service without expectation of financial reward were over.

By 1686, much of the overt Utopian spirit the founders had instilled 50 years prior had been destroyed. By the end of the first century, public disagreements seemed to be the rule rather than the exception and decisions were made by majority, not consensus. The Covenant was no longer enforced nor served as the guide for every decision by the time the town reached its 50th anniversary. That it lasted well into the second generation was, according to one commentator, "longer than anyone had a right to expect." Still, the town remained small and slow growing, with little change to institutional structures or traditional views.

By 1675, taxpayers paid more the county and colony than they did to the town, reflecting a growing importance of the regional bodies and the cost of the colony expanding westward. After 1691, as the county grew more powerful, the town began more closely following the law lest they get fined.

== Government ==
The colonial settlers met for the first time on August 18, 1636, in Watertown. By September 5, 1636, their number grew from 18 at the first meeting to 25 proprietors willing to set out for the new community. By November 25, however, so few people had actually moved to Dedham that the proprietors voted to require every man to move to Dedham permanently by the first day of the following November or they would lose the land they had been granted. A few young men without families set off to spend the winter there, including Nicholas Phillips, Ezekiel Holliman, and likely Ralph Shepard, John Rogers, Lambert Genere, Joseph Shaw, and the Morses.

The first town meeting held in Dedham was on March 23, 1637. Most of the proprietors were present, and it is believed that most of them must have been living in Dedham by then.

For the first fifty years of Dedham's existence, it enjoyed a stable, tranquil government. The town elected a group of wealthy, experienced friends as Selectmen and then heeded their judgement. It also adopted a clause in the covenant that mandated mediation, which supported stability of the society. There was not so much a system of checks and balances so much as there was system where each individual voluntarily restrained himself.

Due to its unique features it was both "a peculiar oligarchy" in that only a few men were chosen for political office and "a most peculiar democracy" in that laws of suffrage changed frequently both to restrict and to expand the franchise.

=== Covenant ===
While the first settlers were subject to the General Court, they had wide latitude to establish a local government as they saw fit. The first public meeting of the plantation was held on August 18, 1636. (Note: Barber has the date as August 15, 1636) A total of 18 men were present, and the town covenant was signed. (Note: In 1636, there were 30 signers. In 1637, there were 46. By 1656, 79 men put their names on the document.) It was a diverse group and included husbandmen, wool-combers, farriers, millers, linen weavers, and butchers.

The covenant outlined both the social ideal they hoped to achieve and the policies and procedures they would use to reach it. They swore they would "in the fear and reverence of our Almighty God, mutually and severally promise amongst ourselves and each to profess and practice one truth according to that most perfect rule, the foundation whereof is ever lasting love." Intended to be perpetual and binding on future generations, it prohibited those who were "contrary minded" and those who didn't share their religious beliefs, but it was not a theocracy. Before a man could join the community he underwent a public inquisition to determine his suitability.

While great effort was taken to ensure disagreements were resolved before they grew into disputes, the covenant also stipulated that differences would be submitted to between one and four other members of the town for resolution. This arbitration system was so successful there was no need for courts. (Note: The third paragraph of the Town Covenant stated "that if at any time differences shall rise between parties of our said town, that then such party or parties shall presently refer all such differences unto some one, two or three others of our said society to be fully accorded and determined without any further delay, if it possibly may be.")

It was also expected that once a decision was made that all would abide by it with no further dissent or debate. For the first fifty years of Dedham's existence, there were no prolonged disputes that were common in other communities.

=== Town Meeting ===
The town meeting "was the original and protean vessel of local authority. The founders of Dedham had met to discuss the policies of their new community even before the General Court had defined the nature of town government." The early meetings were informal, with all men in town likely participating. Attendance at Meetings was considered vital for the life of the community. The meeting operated on a basis of consensus. Even when it did not fully exercise them, "the power of the town meeting knew no limit."

The more wealthy a voter was, the more likely he would attend the meeting. However, "even though no more than 58 men were eligible to come to the Dedham town meeting and to make the decisions for the town, even though the decisions to which they addressed themselves were vital to their existence, even though every inhabitant was required to live within one mile (1.6 km) of the meeting place, even though each absence from the meeting brought a fine, and even though the town crier personally visited the house of every latecomer half an hour after the meeting had begun, only 74 percent of those eligible actually showed up at the typical town meeting between 1636 and 1644."

A colony law required all voters to be Church members until 1647, though it may not have been enforced. Even if it were, 70% of the men in town would have been eligible to participate. The law changed in 1647 and, as it was interpreted in Dedham, all men over 24 were eligible to vote. The colony changed the requirements periodically, though occasionally with a grandfather clause. In provincial elections, only church members could vote. Regardless of whether or not they were able to vote, records indicate that all men were able to attend and speak.

=== Selectmen ===
The whole town would gather regularly to conduct public affairs, but it was "found by long experience that the general meeting of so many men ... has wasted much time to no small damage and business is thereby nothing furthered." In response, on May 3, 1639, seven selectmen were chosen "by general consent" and given "full power to contrive, execute and perform all the business and affairs of this whole town." The leaders they chose "were men of proven ability who were known to hold the same values and to be seeking the same goals as their neighbors" and they were "invested with great authority." If a man served three terms and met with the satisfaction of the community, he tended to stay on the board for many years following.

Soon the selectmen "enjoyed almost complete control over every aspect of local administration." Almost all townsmen would have to appear before them at one point or another during the year to ask for a swap of land, to ask to remove firewood from the common lands, or for some other purpose. The selectmen wrote most of the laws in the town and they levied taxes on their fellow townsmen. They could also approve expenditures. They also served as a court, determining who had broken by-laws and issuing fines. As the selectmen became more active, the Town Meeting became essentially passive.

Selectmen were "the most powerful men in town. As men, they were few in number, old, and relatively rich and saints of the church." It was not required that a man be wealthy to serve, but it improved his chances of getting elected. Men who were not members of the church were still allowed to hold town office. The burdens of office could take up to a third of their time during busy seasons. They served without salary and came up through the ranks of lower offices. In return they became "men of immense prestige" and were frequently selected to serve in other high posts.

=== Relationship between Town Meeting and Selectmen ===
Metric	1636 to 1686	1687 to 1736
Average turnover	1.88 of 7 (27%)	2 of 5 (40%)
Average recruitment of new selectmen	.7 of 7 (10%)	1.1 of 5 (22%)
New men recruited	35	55
Average terms served	7.6	4.8
Percent who serve more than 10 terms	35%	7%
Average cumulative experience of the board	55 years	25 years

After creation of the Board of Selectmen, Town Meetings were generally called only twice a year and usually did not stray far from the agenda prepared for them by the selectmen. In fact, the Meeting would often refer issues to the Selectmen to act upon or to "prepare and ripen the answer" to a difficult question. Town Meeting typically took on only routine business, such as the election of officers or setting the minister's salary, and left other business to the selectmen.

In the late 1600s and early 1700s, Town Meeting began to assert more authority and fewer decisions were left to the judgment of the selectmen. Over the course of 30–40 years, small innovations brought the initiative back to the meeting and away from the board. It brought back a balance of power between the two bodies which, in theory, had always existed, but which in practice had been tilted to the selectmen.

One of the most prominent ways they did so was by calling for more meetings. In the first 50 years of existence, town meetings were held on average about twice a year but by 1700 it was held four or five times each year. The agenda also grew longer and included an open ended item that allowed them to discuss any item they liked, and not just the topics the selectmen placed upon the warrant.

=== Other ===
For 45 of the first 50 years of Dedham's existence, one of the 10 selectmen who served most often also served in "the one superior [the town] recognized, the General Court." In colonial Massachusetts, each town sent two deputies to the General Court each year. Three men, Joshua Fisher, Daniel Fisher, and Eleazer Lusher, virtually monopolized the post between 1650 and 1685.

The first Town Clerk was elected on May 17, 1639.

== Forming a church ==
On July 18, 1637, the Town voted to admit a group of very religious men that would radically change the course of the town's history. Led by John Allin, they included Michael Metcalf, Thomas Wight, (Note: Wight came from the same town in England as Ann Hutchinson and was a parishioner of John Cotton with her. He may have chosen to move to Dedham to avoid the controversy she was stirring up in Boston.) Robert Hinsdale, Eleazer Lusher, Timothy Dalton, and Allin's brother-in-law, Thomas Fisher. Dalton was invited to settle in "civil condition," but it was made clear he was not going to be made the town's minister over Allin. He and Thomas Carter quickly sold their land holdings and left town, Dalton to become a teaching officer in the church of what is today Hampton, New Hampshire, and Carter to the pulpit in Woburn, Massachusetts. Ezekiel Holliman, on the other hand, recognized that as a religious liberal that he was not going to be welcome in town and so moved to Rhode Island with Roger Williams.

=== Establishment ===
While it was of the utmost importance, "founding a church was more difficult than founding a town." Meetings were held late in 1637 and were open to "all the inhabitants who affected church communion ... lovingly to discourse and consult together [on] such questions as might further tend to establish a peaceable and comfortable civil society ad prepare for spiritual communion." On the fifth day of every week they would meet in a different home and would discuss any issues "as he felt the need, all 'humbly and with a teachable heart not with any mind of cavilling or contradicting.'"

After they became acquainted with one another, they asked if "they, as a collection of Christian strangers in the wilderness, have any right to assemble with the intention of establishing a church?" Their understanding of the Bible led them to believe that they did, and so they continued to establish a church based on Christian love, but also one that had requirements for membership.

It took months of discussions before a church covenant could be agreed upon and drafted. The group established thirteen principles, written in a question and answer format, that established the doctrine of the church. Once the doctrinal base was agreed upon, 10 men were selected by John Allin, assisted by Ralph Wheelock, to seek out the "pillars" or "living stones" upon which the congregation would be based.

They began to meet separately and decided six of their own number—Allin, Wheelock, John Luson, John Frary, Eleazer Lusher, and Robert Hinsdale—were suitable to form the church. (Note: Luson, Hinsdale, and Lusher all arrived in Dedham with Allin, and Frary was from the same town in England as Michael Metcalf.) The men found worthy submitted themselves to a conference of the entire community.

Finally, on November 8, 1638, two years after the incorporation of the town and one year after the first church meetings were held, the covenant was signed and the church was gathered. Guests from other towns were invited for the event as they sought the "advice and counsel of the churches" and the "countenance and encouragement of the magistrates."

=== Membership ===
Only "visible saints" were pure enough to become members. A public confession of faith was required, as was a life of holiness. It was not good enough just to have been baptized, because then "papists, heretics, and many visible atheists that are baptized must be received." A group of the most pious men interviewed all who sought admission to the church. To become a member, a candidate must "pour out heart and soul in public confession" and subject every innermost desire to the scrutiny of their peers. All others would be required to attend the sermons at the meeting house, but could not join the church, nor receive communion, be baptized, or become an officer of the church.

Once the church was established, residents, whether or not they were members, would gather several times a week to hear sermons and lectures in practical piety. Between the years of 1644 and 1653, 80% of children born in town were baptized, indicating that at least one parent was a member of the church. Servants and masters, young and old, rich and poor alike all joined the church. Non-members were not discriminated against as seen by several men being elected Selectmen before they were accepted as members of the church.

By 1663, nearly half the men in town were not members, and this number grew as more second generation Dedhamites came of age. The decline was so apparent across the colony by 1660 that a future could be seen when a minority of residents were members, as happened in Dedham by 1670. It was worried that the third generation, if they were born without a single parent who was a member, could not even be baptized.

To resolve the problem, an assembly of ministers from throughout Massachusetts endorsed a "half-way covenant" in 1657 and then again at a church synod in 1662. It allowed parents who were baptized but not members of the church to present their own children for baptism; however, they were denied the other privileges of church membership, including communion. Allin endorsed the measure but the congregation rejected it, striving for a pure church of saints.

=== Ministers ===
Though Allin's salary was donated freely by members and non-members alike his salary was never in arrears, showing the esteem in which the other members of the community held him. In the 1670s, as the Utopian spirit of the community waned, it became necessary to impose a tax to ensure the minister was paid.

Just before Allin's death, it was decided to continue to pay the salary by voluntary contributions of an assessed amount. Several other votes followed in the next 16 months after it was determined that the system no longer worked. No solution was found, however, and the church was constantly behind in paying William Adams' salary.

Minister	Years of service
John Allin	1638–1639
John Phillips	1639-1641
John Allin	1641–1671
Vacant	1671–1673
William Adams	1673–1685
Vacant	1685–1693
Joseph Belcher	1693–1723 (Note: Belcher continued to preach until 1721 when illness prevented him.)

==== John Allin and John Phillips ====
John Phillips, though he was "respected and learned," was "unable to join the church as its first minister." He twice refused calls to settle in Dedham and instead went to the Cambridge church where Harvard College had recently been established. A "tender" search for a minister took an additional several months, and finally John Allin, who was the leader of the small group of church members, was ordained as pastor. John Hunting was selected as Ruling Elder over Ralph Wheelock, who also wanted the position. They were ordained on April 24, 1639.

Phillips left Cambridge at the end of 1639, however, and decided to come to Dedham after all. He quickly became unsatisfied in his new pulpit, however, and returned to his old church in England in October 1641.

As in England, Puritan ministers in the American colonies were usually appointed to the pulpits for life and Allin served for 32 years. He received a salary of between 60 and 80 pounds a year. When land was divided, his name was always at the top of the list and he received the largest plot.

==== William Adams ====
After Allin's death the pulpit went without a settled minister for a long stretch. William Adams, who was graduated from Harvard College two weeks prior to Allin's August 1671 death, had several connections to the town and attended Allin's funeral. By December he had already been approached several times to preach in Dedham.

He finally accepted an offer to preach in Dedham and did so on February 17, 1672. He rejected the call several times, before agreeing to preach on a trial basis in September 1673. He moved to Dedham on May 27, 1673, and was ordained on December 3, 1673. Adams served until his death in 1685. Aside from a few minor squabbles, his time in Dedham was mostly peaceful.

Given the church's rejection of the Half-Way Covenant, which the colony's clergy had endorsed, Adams may have been a last choice option. Eventually the church would recant and accept the Half-Way Covenant

==== Joseph Belcher ====
After Adams died, the church was without a minister from 1685 to 1692. Following his death, the congregation again rejected the Half-Way Covenant. As a result, though a large number of preachers came on a guest basis, and even though several young men were offered the pulpit, the church could not find a minister to settle with them permanently.

At the end of 1691, the congregation voted again to accept the half-way covenant and declared that Allin was right to have tried to get them to accept it. A new minister, Joseph Belcher, began preaching in March 1692 and was installed on November 29, 1693. He remained in the pulpit until the autumn of 1721 until illness prevented him from preaching.

=== Meetinghouses ===
Almost immediately after arriving, the group began holding prayer meetings and worship services under various trees around town. On January 1, 1638, the Town voted to construct a meetinghouse. It was originally planned to be constructed on High Street, near the present day border with Westwood, but those who lived on East Street argued that it should be built more centrally. It is unclear when the building was finished, but presumably was not complete before November 1638. An addition was ordered to be built in 1646, but the plastering was not completed until 1657.

A vote to purchase a bell was made in 1648, but a bell was not hung until February 1652. The bell was looted from a Spanish ship by Captain Thomas Crowell, a privateer working for Robert Rich, 2nd Earl of Warwick. Crowell died in 1649 and he left the bells to Henry Walton of Boston. The original plan was to put in the watchtower attached to the school, but it was decided to put it in the meetinghouse instead.

As a result of the bell being hung, the Town no longer needed to pay Ralph Day to beat a drum announcing the start of meetings. The bell was rung not only to announce the start of public meetings, but also to alert residents of a fire, to announce a death, and to signal the start of church services.

Until a separate schoolhouse was completed, the meetinghouse also served as a classroom. The roof of the east gallery also served as a storehouse for the town's supply of gunpowder following a 1653 vote.

A referendum to build a new meetinghouse, held on February 3, 1673, was conducted with voters casting a piece of white corn if they were in favor and a piece of red corn if they were opposed. The vote was nearly unanimous in favor. The new meetinghouse was erected on June 16, 1673.

== First public school ==
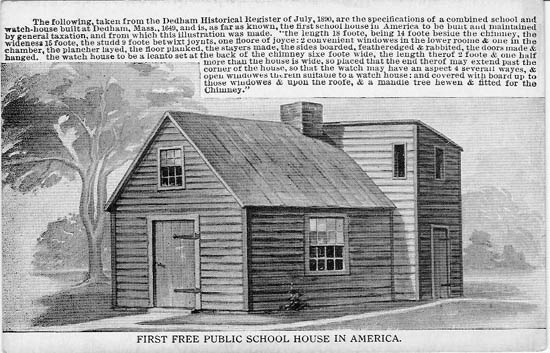
The first taxpayer-funded public school in the United States was in Dedham.

On January 1, 1644, by unanimous vote, Dedham authorized the first U.S. taxpayer-funded public school; "the seed of American education." Its first teacher, Rev. Ralph Wheelock, was paid 20 pounds annually to instruct the youth of the community. Descendants of these students would become presidents of Dartmouth College, Yale University and Harvard University. Another early teacher, Michael Metcalf, was one of the town's first residents and a signer of the Covenant. At the age of 70 he began teaching reading in the school.

John Thurston was commission by the town to build the first schoolhouse in 1648 for which he received a partial payment of £11.0.3 on December 2, 1650. The details in the contract require him to construct floorboards, doors, and "fitting the interior with 'featheredged and rabbited' boarding" similar to that found in the Fairbanks House.

The early residents of Dedham were so committed to education that they donated £4.6.6 to Harvard College during its first eight years of existence, a sum greater than many other towns, including Cambridge itself. By the later part of the century, however, a sentiment of anti-intellectualism had pervaded the town. Residents were content to allow the minister to be the local intellectual and did not establish a grammar school as required by law. As a result, the town was called into court in 1675 and then again in 1691.

== Population ==
On June 3, 1637, Ruth Morse was the first child born to white parents, John and Annis, in Dedham.

The average population during the 1600s was about 500 people making slightly larger than the average English village during the same time period. With people moving either in or out of town, nearly all growth came from births and all declines through deaths. The average age for first marriages was 25 for men and 23 for women, in contrast to the European average of 27 for men and 25 for women. Younger marriages resulted in more births. There were fewer deaths as well, partially due to Dedham being spared disease, famine, and extreme climate events that ravaged parts of Europe during this time.

By the 1650s, a variety of types of men were living in Dedham, including bachelors, family men, the well-to-do, and servants. Some bought land in town but never settled there, some left soon after arriving, either to other towns or back to England, and a few died before they could do much of anything.

Historical population

Year	Pop.
1637	31 men, plus their families
1640	>200
1648	~400
1651	~100 families
Late 1650s	150+ men, plus others
1666	83 legal voters
1686	>600
1700	700–<750 (Note: In 1711, there were 45 families living north of the Charles River.)
1736	1,200
1750	1,500–1,600
1761	<1,900
1765	1,919
1775	>2,000
1790	1,659
1800	1,973

Year	Pop.
1801	2,000
1830	3,057
1837	3,532
1850	4,447
1860	6,330
1865	7,198 (Note: 27% of the population was foreign-born, and 75% of them were from Ireland. The other 25% were German-speaking.)
1870	7,342
1880	6,233
1888	6,641 (Note: In 1880, the population of East Dedham was 3,600.)
1890	7,123
1892	>7,000
1895	7,211
1899	6,641 (Note: The population decreased in 1897 when Westwood separated and became its own town. The proportion of foreign-born residents then grew to more than 28%.)
1900	7,457
1908	7,774

Year	Pop.
1910	6,641
1915	9,284
1920	10,782
1930	11,043
1940	15,136
1950	15,508
1960	18,407
1970	23,869
1980	26,938
1990	25,298
2000	23,782
2002	23,378
2010	24,729
2020	25,364
2023	24,968

== Lifestyles of early settlers ==
=== Land distribution ===
Each man received tiny houselots in the village with additional strips of arable land, meadow, and woods. Each strip was located in a common field and the community decided which crop to grow and how to care for and harvest it. The common field method brought men into regular contact with one another and prevented farms from being established far from the village center. As there is no record of clearing the land, it was probably used previously by the native population. Each man was also assigned a plot of land within the field to cultivate. Residents grew corn, beans, peas, and pumpkin. Later residents who acquired larger plots of land planted wheat, rye, barley, and oats.

The land was given sparingly, with no family given land than they could currently improve. Married men received 12 acres, four of which were swamp, while single men received eight, with three acres being swampland. Lands were also awarded in return for service to the church and the community, a practice that had long been established by the General Court.

Land was distributed according to several criteria. The first was the number of persons in the household. Servants were considered a part of a freeman's estate. Land was also given according to the "rank, quality, desert and usefulness, either in church of commonwealth" of the proprietor. Finally, it was thought that men who were engaged in a trade other than farming should have the materials needed to work and those who were able to improve more land should have that fact taken into account.

=== Insularity ===
Most of the original settlers and early arrivals made Dedham their home to live out their lives. Less than two percent of men in the town arrived in any given year and less than one percent left. Because of the low geographic mobility, the town became "a self-contained social unit, almost hermetically sealed off from the rest of the world." This stability was a "typical, persistent, and highly important feature of Dedham's history." A century after settlement, immigration and emigration were still rare. Of every 10 men born in Dedham between 1680 and 1700, eight would die there.

From its earliest days, Dedham was closed off to all unless the current residents explicitly welcomed someone in. Shortly after the town was incorporated, in November 1636, Town Meeting voted not to allow any land sales unless the buyer was already a resident of the town, or was approved by a majority of the other voters. On August 11, 1637, a total of 46 house lots had been laid out and it was voted to stop admitting new residents.

Two decades after the plantation was begun, those who had done the hard work of first settling the land were worried that, as the town's population grew, their dividends of land would be diluted. On January 23, 1657, the growth of the town was further limited to descendants of those living there at the time. Newcomers could settle there, so long as they were like-minded, but they would have to buy their way into the community. Land was no longer freely available for those who wished to join.

=== Wealth ===
With a small population, a simple and agrarian economy, and the free distribution of large tracts of land, there was very little disparity in wealth. In the early days anyone who might be considered poor was likely to be a sick widow, an orphan, or "an improvident half-wit." In 1690, the poorest 20% of the population owned about 10% of the property.

At least 85% of the population were farmers or, as they called themselves, "yeoman" or "husbandman." There were also those who served the farmers, including millers, blacksmiths, or cordwainers. Like in the English countryside, they were largely subsistence farmers who grew enough for their families but did not specialize in any cash crops or particular animals. The first homes were all fairly similar, built with boards and stone fireplaces and chimneys. The hip roofs were covered with thatch. The first floor would have a living room and kitchen, and sleeping quarters could be reached by ladder in the garret above.

Each person may own two changes of clothes plus a good suit or cloak, and a family may have a little silver or pewter. They typically would own a Bible, pots, pans, bowls, and bins. Outside of the house, in the barn or lean-to, would be agricultural tools and a few bushels of crops. For animals, one or two horses along with several cattle, pigs, and sheep were common.

=== Labor ===
Single people, including adult children of residents, were not allowed to live alone unless they had sufficient resources to set up their own household with servants. Each year, one day was set aside to assign young adult to other households as subordinates. The practice was intended to both keep up the family labor system that underpinned the local economy, and was to prevent the "sin and iniquity ... [that] are the companions and consequences of a solitary life." Selectmen also had the authority to take children out of homes and put them to work in other households. If a household did not pay their full taxes, or if a household was not deemed efficient enough, children could be removed and placed in the homes of richer men.

In 1681, there were 28 servants serving in 22 of the 112 households in town. Of them, all but four were children and 20 of the servants were white. There were ten boys, eight girls, two "Negro boys," two "Indian boys," one "lad," and one "English girl." There was also one man, one "Negro man," and two "maids." The servants in town, while they served in 20% of the households, made up only 5% of the population. Most of them soon became independent yeomen.

Many of the children who lived in Dedham as servants may have been taken in partly out of charity. After King Phillip's War, there were a large number of orphaned children. With Dedham's strong ties to Deerfield, it is presumed that some of the children—white and Indian—were casualties of the war.

== Relationship with native peoples ==
In April 1637, the Town voted to begin keeping watch to prevent Indian attacks. By May, however, they were lamenting the time and resources they were spending on patrols. A delegation was sent to Watertown to ask Thomas Cakebread to move`to Dedham "upon good consideration of his knowledge of martial affairs." Just a year later, however, the new town of Sudbury enticed him to move there by granting him a monopoly on the milling business in town.

New settlements, which grew into separately incorporated towns, were established for several reasons, including to serve as a buffer between the native peoples and the village of Dedham. Medfield and Wrentham, which broke away from Dedham, each suffered at least one Indian raid during the 17th century that would have otherwise struck the mother town. Dedham itself had served as a buffer in its own time between native peoples and the population centers along the coast, as well as against the freethinking followers of Roger Williams.

In the 1680s, the Town fathers sought out and purchased the rights to the land from every native person who claimed to own land or hold title.

Sarah David, the wife of Alexander Quapish, was known as the "last Indian" in Dedham. When Sarah died in 1774, she was buried at the ancient Indian burial ground near Wigwam Pond. She was said to be the last person buried there. (Note: The area has since been converted into athletic fields and a commercial shopping space.)

=== King Phillip's War ===
During King Phillip's War, men from Dedham went off to fight and several died. More former Dedhamites who had moved on to other towns died than men who were still living in the community, however. They included Robert Hinsdale, his four sons, and Jonathan Plympton who died at the Battle of Bloody Brook. John Plympton was burned at the stake after being marched to Canada with Quentin Stockwell.

Zachariah Smith was passing through Dedham on April 12, 1671, when he stopped at the home of Caleb Church in the "sawmill settlement" on the banks of the Neponset River. The next morning he was found dead, having been shot. A group of praying Indians found him and suspicion fell on a group on non-Christian Nipmucs who were also heading south to Providence. This was the "first actual outrage of King Phillip's War." One of the Nipmucs, a son of Matoonas, was found guilty and hanged on Boston Common. For the next six years his head would be impaled on a pike at the end of the gallows as a warning to other native peoples. Dedham then readied its cannon, which had been issued by the colony in 1650, in preparation for an attack that never came.

After the raid on Swansea, the colony ordered the militias of several towns, including Dedham, to have 100 militiamen ready to march out of town on an hour's notice. Captain Daniel Henchmen took command of the men and left Boston on June 26, 1675. They arrived in Dedham by nightfall and the troops became worried by an eclipse of the moon, which they took as a bad omen. Some claimed to see native scalplocks and bows in the moon. Dedham was largely spared from the fighting and was not attacked, but they did build a fortification and offered tax cuts to men who joined the cavalry.

Plymouth Colony governor Josiah Winslow and Captain Benjamin Church rode from Boston to Dedham to take charge of the 465 infantrymen and 275 cavalry assembling there and together departed on December 8, 1675, for the Great Swamp Fight. (Note: Hanson has the date as December 9th.) When the commanders arrived, they also found "a vast assortment of teamsters, volunteers, servants, service personnel, and hangers-on." Dedham's John Bacon died in the battle.

During the battle in Lancaster in February 1676, Jonas Fairbanks and his son Joshua both died. Richard Wheeler, whose son Joseph was killed in battle the previous August, also died that day. When the town of Medfield was attacked, they fired a cannon as a warning to Dedham. Residents of nearby Wrentham abandoned their community and fled for the safety of Dedham and Boston.

Pumham, one of Phillip's chief advisors, was captured in Dedham on July 25, 1676. Several Christian Indians had seen his band in the woods, nearly starved to death. Captain Samuel Hunting led 36 men from Dedham and Medfield and joined 90 Indians on a hunt to find them. A total of 15 of the enemy were killed and 35 were captured. Pumham, though he was so wounded he could not stand, grabbed hold of a militiaman and would have killed him had one of the militiaman's comrades not come to his rescue.

John Plympton and Quentin Stockwell were captured in Deerfield in September 1677 and marched to Canada. Stockell was eventually ransomed and wrote an account of his ordeal, but Plympton was burned at the stake.

=== Praying Indians ===
In the middle of the 17th century the Reverend John Eliot converted many of the native people in the area to Christianity and taught them how to live a stable, agrarian life. He converted so many that the group needed a large portion of land on which they could grow their own crops. John Allin assisted Elliot in his work, and it is probably through his influence that Dedham agreed to give up 2,000 acres (8.1 km^{2}) of what is today Natick to the "praying Indians in 1650."

In return, Dedham expected the Indians to settle only on the northern bank of the Charles River, not to set any traps outside their grant, and give up all claims to any land elsewhere in Dedham. The natives, who did not hold the same notions of private property as the colonists, settled on the south side of the river and set traps within the bounds of Dedham. Disputes began arising in 1653, and compromise, arbitration, and negotiation were all attempted.

In 1661, Dedham gave up attempts at friendly solutions and took their indigenous neighbors to court, suing for title to the land the Indians were inhabiting. The case centered around the Indians' use of a tract of land along the Charles River. The native people claimed they had an agreement to use the land for farming with the Town Fathers, but Dedham officials objected. While the law was on the side of the town, Elliot made a moral argument that the group had a need for land of their own.

The case eventually went before the General Court who granted the land in question to the Indians and, in compensation for the land lost, gave another 8,000 acres (32 km^{2}) in what is today Deerfield, Massachusetts to the Dedham settlers. The town's actions in the case were characterized by "deceptions, retaliations, and lasting bitterness," and they harassed their native neighbors with petty accusations event after the matter was settled.

== Parishes, precincts, and new towns ==
As the town's population grew greater and greater, residents began moving further away from the center of town. Within a quarter century of the first settlement, an expansionist philosophy had developed within Dedham. In the 1670s, with each new dividend of land, farmers began taking shares close to their existing plots. This, along with special "convenience grants" close by their existing fields, allowed townsmen to consolidate their holdings. A market for buying and selling land also emerged by which farmers would sell parcels further away from their main plots and buy land closer to them.

When this began happening, residents first started moving their barns closer to their fields and then their homes as well. By 1686, homes coalesced in several outlying areas, pulling their owners away from the day-to-day life of the village center. As the numbers further away grew they began to break off and form new towns beginning with Medfield in 1651.

Until 1682 all Dedhamites had lived within 1.5 miles (2.4 km) of the meetinghouse. After Walpole left, Dedham had just 25% of its original land area. Dedham residents also became, in substantial numbers, early settlers of Lancaster, Hadley, and Sherborn, Massachusetts.

Community	Year incorporated as a town	Notes
Medfield	1651	The first town to leave Dedham.
Natick	1659	Established as a community for Christian Indians.
Wrentham	1673	Southeast corner of town was part of the Dorchester New Grant of 1637.
Deerfield	1673	Land was granted to Dedham in return for giving up Natick.

=== Medfield ===
The majority of present-day Medfield had been granted to Dedham in 1636, but the lands on the western bank of the Charles River had been meted out by the General Court to individuals. Edward Alleyn, for example, had been granted 300 acres in 1642. Dedham asked the General Court for some of those lands and, on October 23, 1649, the Court granted the request so long as they established a separate village there within one year.

Dedham sent Eleazer Lusher, Joshua Fisher, Henry Phillips, John Dwight, and Daniel Fisher to map out an area three miles by four miles and the colony sent representatives to set the boundaries on the opposite side of the river. The land that Dedham contributed to the new village became Medfield, and the land the colony contributed eventually broke away to become Medway.

The separations were not without difficulty, however. When Medfield left there were disagreements about the responsibility for public debts and about land use. There were some residents who did not move to the new village who wanted rights to the meadows while others thought that the land should be given freely to those who would settle them. A compromise was reached where those moving to the new village would pay £100 to those who remained in lieu of rights to the meadows. It was later reduced to £60, if paid over three years, or £50 if paid in one year.

Tax records show that those who chose to move to the new village came from the middle class of Dedham residents. Among the first 20 men to make the move were Ralph Wheelock, Thomas Mason, Thomas Wright, John Samuel Morse and his son Daniel, John Frary Sr., Joseph Clark Sr., John Ellis, Thomas Ellis, Henry Smith, Robert Hinsdale, Timothy Dwight, James Allen, Henry Glover, Isaac Genere, and Samuel Bullen. By 1664, several of their sons would join them, as would Joshua Fisher (Note: The father of Joshua Fisher, the politician.) and his son John, and several other Dedhamites. Those who moved there often moved with family members, and many would move on from their to other inland communities. It is also possible that those who left Dedham for Medfield were those most disaffected by the political or social climate within the town.

Town Meeting voted to release Medfield on January 11, 1651, and the General Court agreed the following May.

=== Wrentham ===
In 1660, after the dust had settled on the Medfield separation, five men were sent to explore the lakes near George Indian's wigwam and to report back to the selectmen what they found. The report of those men, Daniel Fisher, Joshua Fisher, Sgt. Fuller, Richard Ellis, and Richard Wheeler, was received with such enthusiasm that in March 1661 it was voted to start a new settlement there. The Town then voted to send Ellis and Timothy Dwight to go negotiate with King Phillip to purchase the title to the area known as Wollomonopoag.

They purchased 600 acres (Note: Dwight has the figure as six square miles.) of land for £24, 6s. The money was paid out of pocket by Captain Thomas Willett, who accompanied Ellis and Dwight. The Town voted to assess a tax upon the cow commons to repay him, but some thought the money should be paid by those who would be moving to the new village. The dispute resulted in Willet not being paid back for several years.

After the boundaries of the new community were set, the Town voted to give up all rights to the land in return for the proprietors paying Dedham £160 over four years, beginning in 1661. By January 1663, however, little progress had been made towards establishing a new village. A meeting was called, and the 10 men (Note: It is not known who all 10 were, but they included Anthony Fisher, Richard Ellis, Robert Weare, and Isaac Bullard.) who volunteered to go raised several concerns about their ability to move forward.

After much discussion, it was decided not to give the 600 acres to the group of pre-selected men, but rather to lay out lots and then award them by lottery. Those who already began to improve their lots were allowed to keep them, (Note: Those granted a dispensation included Richard Ellis, Anthony Fisher Jr., Robert Weare, Isaac Bullard, James Thorpe, Samuel Fisher, Samuel Parker, Joshua Kent and John Farrington . Ralph Freeman, Daniel Makiak, and Sgt. Stearnes did not have pre-selected lots of land, but were among the first settlers.) and land for a church, burial ground, training ground, roads, and officer lots were not included. All were free to buy and sell their lots.

Not much happened at Wollomonopoag until 1668, at which time a report arrived of native peoples planting corn and cutting down trees on the land that Dedham had purchased. Eleazer Lusher was charged with sending the illiterate Indians a letter warning them to "depart from that place and trespass no further." Samuel Fisher then took it to them and read it aloud, at which point they replied that they had every intention of remaining on the land. Though they had still not paid him back for the land in question, the Town then asked Willett to speak with King Phillip and ask that he intervene.

There is no record of Phillip's response to that entreaty but, in August 1669, (Note: Hanson has the letter dated 25 May 1669. Dwight has the date of offer to be in November.) the Town Fathers received an odd letter from him offering to negotiate for more land if they would quickly send him a "holland shirt." Dwight and four others were appointed to negotiate with him again, provided Phillip could prove he, and not another sachem, had the rights to the land. In November, an agreement was reached to clear the title for £17 0s 8d. There is no record of whether a shirt was traded.

Samuel Sheares lived alone at Wollomonopoag for some time before a new attempt at a settlement was undertaken in 1671. Five men, John Thurston, Thomas Thurston, Robert Weare, John Weare, and Joseph Cheeney moved there with him, followed the next year by Rev. Samuel Man, a one-time teacher in the Dedham Public Schools. Robert Crossman was employed at the same time to construct a corn mill. Man would be selected by the residents of the new village to be their minister, and their decision was ratified by a committee of John Allin, John Hunting, and Eleazer Lusher.

Those who moved there were drawn from the middle class of Dedham. They were primarily people from outside of Dedham who had purchased land there, and second generation Dedhamites who moved without their parents. Without the outsiders, it is questionable whether the new community would have survived.

Soon, however, the Wollomonopoag settlers complained that those in the village center were keeping them in a state of colonial dependency. They were upset about absentee landlords whose land values were going up thanks to the labor of the inhabitants and who refused to pay taxes to support the community. They also complained that with the seat of the town government being so far away that they were disenfranchised and best by a lack of capital. Constables refused to travel to Wollomonopoag to make collections, assessments, and social judgement.

With the blessing of Dedham's Board of Selectmen, the General Court separated the new town of Wrentham, Massachusetts on October 16, 1673.

=== Deerfield ===
After the "Praying Indians" were given 8,000 acres (32 km^{2}) in what is today Natick, the General Court gave the Dedham proprietors 8,000 acres (32 km^{2}) in compensation. The question of how to handle the additional grant puzzled the town for some time. There were those who wanted to sell the rights to the land and take the money, while others wanted to find a suitable location and take possession.

The Town sent Anthony Fisher Jr., Nathaniel Fisher, and Sgt. Fuller to explore an area known as "Chestnut Country" in 1863. They reported back two weeks later that the area was hilly, with few meadows, and was generally unsuitable for their purposes. After a potential location was claimed by others before Dedham could do so, a report was received about land at a place known as Pocomtuck, about 12 or 14 miles from Hadley. It was decided to claim the land before others could do so.

Joshua Fisher, Ensign John Euerard, and Jonathan Danforth were assigned by the selectmen to go and map the land in return for 150 acres. Two weeks later Fisher appeared before the board, demanding 300 acres instead. The selectmen agreed, provided that he provide a plot map of the land. Fisher's map and report were submitted to the General Court, and they agreed to give the land to Dedham provided that they settle the land and "maintain the ordinances of Christ there" within five years. Fisher was the first in the region to use a compass while surveying.

Daniel Fisher and Eleazer Lusher were sent to purchase the land from the Pocomtuc Indians who lived there. They contracted with John Pynchon, who had a relationship with the native peoples there, and he obtained a quitclaim deed from them. Pynchon submitted a bill for £40 in 1666 but a tax on the cow commons to pay it was not imposed until 1669. By that time the bill had risen to over £96, and he was not paid in full until 1674.

The drawing of lots took place on May 23, 1670, by which time many rights had been sold to people from outside of Dedham or one of her daughter towns. Before that even happen, Robert Hinsdale's son Samuel moved into the area and began squatting on the land. He was eventually joined by his father and brothers.

Hard feelings arose at the distance of the new settlement from Dedham and the fact that the proprietors were not strictly "a Dedham company." On May 7, 1673, the General Court separated the town of Deerfield, with additional lands, provided they establish a church and settle a minister within three years.

== Natural resources ==
=== Mother Brook ===
While both the Charles River and the Neponset River ran through Dedham and close by to one another, both were slow-moving and could not power a mill. With an elevation difference of 40 feet (12 m) between the two, however, a canal connecting them would be swift-moving. In 1639 the town ordered that a 4000-foot ditch be dug between the two so that one third of the Charles' water would flow down what would become known as Mother Brook and into the Neponset. Abraham Shaw would begin construction of the first dam and mill on the Brook in 1641 and it would be completed by John Elderkin, who later built the first church in New London, Connecticut. A fulling mill would be established in 1682.

=== Trees ===
It is estimated that each family would burn enough wood in a year to clear cut four acres of land. With the memory of the social unrest that happened in Boston when they cleared nearly every tree in that town within three years of its founding, restrictions upon cutting trees on public and unallotted lands were strictly enforced. Preserving these trees became "one of the first conservation projects in New England.

The Old Avery Oak Tree, named for Dr. William Avery, stood on East Street for several centuries. The builders of the USS Constitution once offered $70 to buy the tree, but the owner would not sell. The Avery Oak, which was over 16' in circumference, survived the New England Hurricane of 1938 to be toppled by a violent thunderstorm in 1973; the Town Meeting Moderator's gavel was carved out of it.

=== Swamps, bogs, and meadows ===
Owners of swampland were required to drain them. At first, this was supposed to be voluntary but it quickly became a mandate, with a fine of "the price of a Ewe kid" for those who failed to do so. The mandate was suspended for the summer, but it was agreed to reimpose it if the swamp land next to the settlement was not cleared by May.

Clearing the swamp served several purposes. First, it deprived dangerous wild animals of a habitat. Secondly, it made it easier to cut down the trees on the land at a time when lumber was in high demand for building projects and for burning. Clearing the swamp turns it into a bog, and draining a bog turns it into a meadow. Meadowland was in high demand to raise cattle, and the rich meadows along the Charles River were a major factor in choosing the location to settle in the first place.

The General Court had awarded 300 acres to Samuel Dudley along the northeast border of town, between East Street and the river. (Note: East Street was part of an ancient Indian trail) Four men, Samuel Morse, Philemon Dalton, Lambert Genere, and John Dwight, purchased the meadowland from Dudley for £20. With an immediate need for more meadows, the Town purchased it from them for £40, doubling their initial investment. The land came to be known as Purchase Meadows and was divided into herdwalks for use by the residents of the various districts.

A road, today known as Needham Street, was laid out along the banks of the Charles River in 1645, but was frequently washed out or flooded. The road brought farmers from their homes in the village to the planting field at Great Plain, in what is today Needham. In addition to washing out the road, the waters would also frequently would flood the "broad meadow," further limiting needed pasture.

It was discovered that the river, which runs due east for many miles, suddenly took a turn southeast, then north, and then northwest, at which point it flowed close by to where it originally turned. Despite a run of seven or eight miles, it only fell three feet, accounting for much of the flooding. In January 1652, Town Meeting voted to dig a 4000-foot ditch connecting the Charles River at either end of its great loop. It was not completed for nearly two years, but once it was it began channeling the water directly from the high side to the low side. Doing so also created an island, today the neighborhood of Riverdale.

=== Sawmills ===
In 1699, with the town fed up with conflict between two mill owners on Mother Brook, Ezra Morse's dam was removed, and Morse was given 40 acres of land near the Neponset River at Tiot in compensation. He would go on to open a new mill there, in what is today Norwood, Massachusetts, next to a sawmill that Joshua Fisher and Eleazer Lusher opened in 1664. (Note: Fisher's mill is now on the seal of Walpole, Massachusetts.) Permission for the mill in the cedar swamp was granted in 1658.

Thomas Clapp built a sawmill soon after arriving in Dedham in 1661, though the location is unknown, but forfeited it to the town in 1674. Joshua Fisher, and his cousin, Daniel Fisher, built another saw mill on the Charles River in 1683.

The mills were carefully controlled by the town, with tax abatements and non-compete clauses providing incentives for owners. Contracts with saw mill owners also outlined the terms of payment and listed the areas where trees could be cut down for milling. The area of what is today Westwood proved to be such a profitable area for harvesting and milling pine trees that it became known as Clapboard Trees Parish.

=== Animals ===
Wild animals were an issue, and the town placed a bounty on several of them. Upon producing an inch and a half of a rattlesnake, plus the rattle, the killer was entitled to six pence. A ten shilling bounty was placed on wolves, and was frequently paid, in addition to a bounty on wildcats. In 1638, seven-year-old John Dwight disappeared in the woods near Wigwam Pond, an area known to be particularly infested with wolves. (Note: Parr has the date as March 1639, and Dwight's age as 17, not seven.) Between 1650 and 1672, more than 70 wolves were killed in Dedham.

For a short period of time, the Town employed professional hunters and a pack of dogs. Dogs could also be a problem, though. In 1651, the Town deputized Joshua Fisher to keep them from disturbing people in the meetinghouse. On May 27, 2647, Daniel Fisher gave a parcel of land to the Town for use as an animal pound but reserved the right to cut the trees on it.

A great black boar, eight feet long, walked into town in November 1677. Nearly every man in town was assembled around it with his musket before they could subdue it. Eventually it would take 13 bullets before it was killed.

=== Mines and minerals ===
By 1647, residents had discovered "plenty of iron and some lead" in the wilderness. All were encouraged to seek out more and the following year John Dwight and Francis Chickering thought they had discovered a mine in present-day Wrentham. A decade later, in 1658, a committee was appointed to look into setting up an ironworks within the town. Neither the mine nor the ironwork would pan out, however.

== Other ==
=== Cemetery ===
The first portion of the Old Village Cemetery was set apart at the first recorded meeting of the settlers of Dedham on August 18, 1636, with land taken from Nicholas Phillips and Joseph Kingsbury. The original boundaries were roughly Village Avenue on the north, St. Paul's Church in the east, land later added by Dr. Edward Stimson in the south, and the main driveway off Village Avenue in the west. It remained the only cemetery in Dedham for nearly 250 years until Brookdale Cemetery was established.

=== Early records ===
Of towns founded during the colonial era, Dedham is one of the few towns "that has preserved extensive records of its earliest years." They have been described as "very full and perfect." So detailed were the records that a map of the home lots of the first settlers can be drawn using only the descriptions in the book of grants. Many of the records come from Timothy Dwight, who served as town clerk for 10 years and selectman for 25.

In 1681, the town voted to collect all deeds and other writings and store them in a box kept by Deacon John Aldis in order to better preserve them. The records included four deeds from Indians at Petumtuck, one from Chief Nehoiden, one from Magus, and one deed and one receipt from King Phillip. (Note: These deeds have since been lost.)

=== Jonathan Fairbanks ===
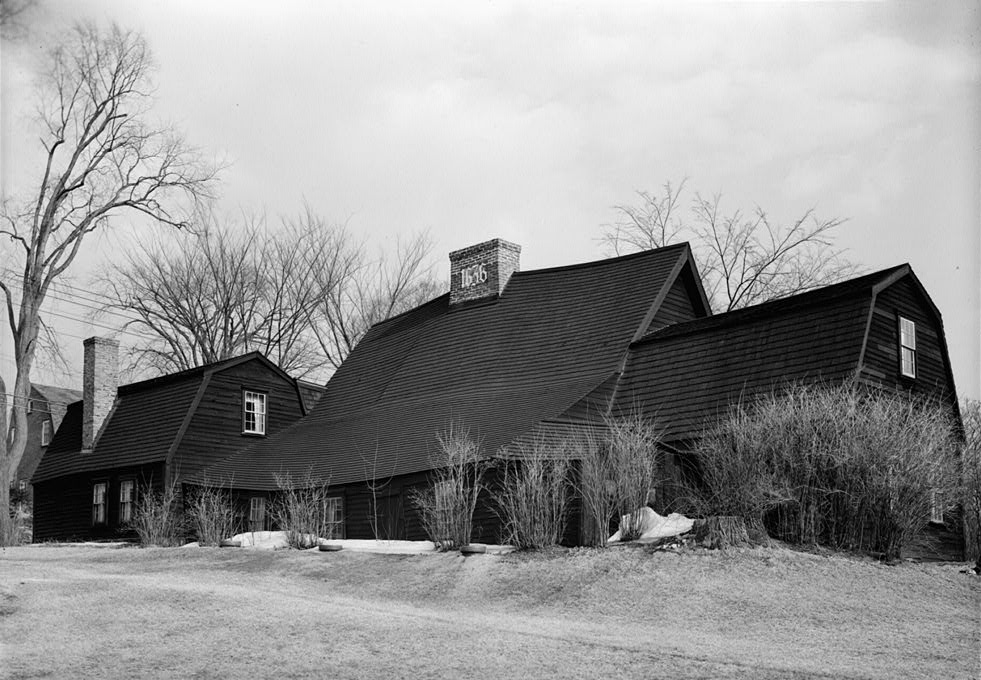
The Fairbanks House is the oldest timber-frame house in North America.

In 1637 Jonathan Fairbanks signed the town Covenant and was allotted 12 acres (49,000 m^{2}) of land to build his home, which today is the oldest house in North America. In 1640 "the selectmen provided that Jonathan Fairbanks 'may have one cedar tree set out unto him to dispose of where he will: In consideration of some special service he hath done for the towne.'" He had "long stood off from the church upon some scruples about public profession of faith and the covenant, yet after divers loving conferences ... he made such a declaration of his faith and conversion to God and profession of subjection to the ordinances of Christ in the church that he was readily and gladly received by the whole church."

The house is still owned by the Fairbanks family and today stands at 511 East Street, on the corner of Whiting Ave. Jonathan Fairbanks would have a number of notable descendants including murderer Jason Fairbanks of the famous Fairbanks case, as well as Presidents William H. Taft, George H. W. Bush, George W. Bush and Vice President Charles W. Fairbanks. He is also an ancestor of the father and son Governors of Vermont Erastus Fairbanks and Horace Fairbanks, the poet Emily Dickinson, and the anthropologist Margaret Mead.

=== Early laws ===
In early years each resident was cautioned to keep a ladder handy in case he may need to put out a fire on his thatched roof or climb out of harm's way should there be an attack from the Indians. It was also decreed that if any man should tie his horse to the ladder against the meetinghouse then he would be fined sixpence. The Town occasionally "found it necessary to institute fines against those caught borrowing another's canoe without permission or cutting down trees on the common land." A one shilling fine was imposed in 1651 for taking a canoe without permission.

=== Colonial politics ===
When King Charles II threatened to revoke the charter of the Massachusetts Bay Colony, Dedham went firmly on the record as opposing any such action. Town meeting requested that Governor Simon Bradstreet protect the rights and interests of the colonists. In a unanimous vote, they also rejected a motion to completely subjugate themselves to the king and accept his decision to revoke the charter.

Daniel Fisher and his sister Lydia helped to hide William Goffe and Edward Whalley after they sought asylum in American. During the 1689 Boston revolt, Fisher grabbed Governor Edmund Andros by the collar and placed him under arrest, both to protect him from a mob and to ensure that he stood trial.

A group of notable clergy from around the colony, including Dedham's John Allin, wrote a petition to the General Court in 1671 complaining that the lawmakers were contributing to anti-clerical sentiment. They asked for the General Court to endorse the authority of the clergy in spiritual matters, which by implication included the half-way covenant. The General Court complied but 15 members, including Joshua Fisher and Daniel Fisher, dissented.

== Works cited ==
- Abbott, Katharine M. (1903). Old Paths And Legends Of New England (PDF). New York: The Knickerbocker Press. pp. 290–297.
- Barber, John Warner (1848). Historical Collections: Being a General Collection of Interesting Facts, Traditions, Biographical Sketches, Anecdotes, &c., Relating to the History and Antiquities of Every Town in Massachusetts, with Geographical Descriptions. Lazell. pp. 455–463.
- Blake, Mortimer (1879). A History of the Town of Franklin, Mass: From Its Settlement to the Completion of Its First Century, 2d March, 1878 : with Genealogical Notices of Its Earliest Families, Sketches of Its Professional Men, and a Report of the Centennial Celebration. Higginson Book Company.
- Brown, Richard D.; Tager, Jack (2000). Massachusetts: A concise history. University of Massachusetts Press. ISBN 978-1558492493.
- Carter, Jane Greenough Avery; Holmes, Susie Perry (1893). Genealogical Record of the Dedham Branch of the Avery Family in America. Press of Avery & Doten. pp. 19–34.
- Dwight, Benjamin Woodbridge (1874). The History of the Descendants of John Dwight, of Dedham, Mass. J. F. Trow & son, printers and bookbinders.
- Fisher, Phillip A. (1898). The Fisher Genealogy: A Record of the Descendants of Joshua, Anthony, and Cornelius Fisher, of Dedham, Mass., 1630-1640. Massachusetts Publishing Company. ISBN 978-0-608-32125-7.
- Free Public Library Commission of Massachusetts (1908). Report of the Free Public Library Commission of Massachusetts. Secretary of the Commonwealth.
- Goodwin, Nathaniel (1982). Genealogical Notes Or Contributions to the Family History of Some of the First Settlers of Connecticut and Massachusetts. Genealogical Publishing Com. ISBN 978-0-8063-0159-4.
- Hanson, Robert Brand (1976). Dedham, Massachusetts, 1635-1890. Dedham Historical Society.
- Jordan, John Woolf (2004). Colonial And Revolutionary Families Of Pennsylvania. Genealogical Publishing Com. ISBN 978-0-8063-5239-8.
- Knudsen, Harold M. (2025). Fisher Ames, Christian Founding Father & Federalist. Liberty Hill Publishing.
- Levy, Barry (1997). "Girls and Boys: Poor Children and the Labor Market in Colonial Massachusetts". Pennsylvania History: A Journal of Mid-Atlantic Studies. 64: 287–307. JSTOR 27774064.
- Lockridge, Kenneth (1985). A New England Town. New York: W.W. Norton & Company. ISBN 978-0-393-95459-3.
- Lockridge, Kenneth A.; Kreider, Alan (1966). "The Evolution of Massachusetts Town Government, 1640 to 1740". The William and Mary Quarterly. 23 (4): 549–574. doi:10.2307/1919125. JSTOR 1919125.
- Mansbridge, Jane J. (1980). Beyond Adversary Democracy. New York: Basic Books.
- Massachusetts Board of Library Commissioners (1899). Report of the Free Public Library Commission of Massachusetts.
- Neiswander, Judith (2024). Mother Brook and the Mills of East Dedham. Damianos Publishing. ISBN 978-1-941573-66-2.
- Parr, James L. (2009). Dedham: Historic and Heroic Tales From Shiretown. The History Press. ISBN 978-1-59629-750-0.
- Smith, Frank (1936). A History of Dedham, Massachusetts. Transcript Press, Incorporated.
- Whittemore, Henry (1967). Genealogical Guide to the Early Settlers of America: With a Brief History of Those of the First Generation and References to the Various Local Histories, and Other Sources of Information where Additional Data May be Found. Genealogical Publishing Com. ISBN 978-0-8063-0378-9.
- Worthington, Erastus (1827). The history of Dedham: from the beginning of its settlement, in September 1635, to May 1827. Dutton and Wentworth.
- Worthington, Erastus (1900). Historical sketch of Mother Brook, Dedham, Mass: compiled from various records and papers, showing the diversion of a portion of the Charles River into the Neponset River and the manufactures on the stream, from 1639 to 1900. Dedham, MA: C.G. Wheeler.
