= Edward Richards (Massachusetts politician) =

17th century New England settler

Edward Richards (1610-1684) was an early settler of and nine term selectman in Dedham, Massachusetts.

== Life ==
Richards was born circa 1610 -1615. He may have been the brother of Nathaniel Richards and, through his wife Susan, was brother-in-law of John Hunting. He may have traveled in 1632 on board the Lyon from England to Massachusetts with Nathaniel and settled in Cambridge, Massachusetts until 1636. Nathaniel moved to Connecticut to found Hartford, but Edward Richards first appears in Dedham in 1636, which is where he married Susan in 1638. He signed the Dedham Covenant and was a member of First Church and Parish in Dedham.

Though Dedham was intended to be a Utopian commune, and there was little disparity in wealth, Richards went by the title of "Gent" and, unlike others, aspired to a manor. He received large tracts of land, second only to the minister, John Allin. Before moving to Dedham, he purchased a large estate to use as his home and did not receive a house lot, as other settlers did. He then purchased and was distributed other tracts of land, one of which became known as Broad Oak.

He died in May 1684. In his will, he left his home to his second son, Nathaniel, and not his oldest, John. (Note: The home in 1861 was the home of Rev. Ebenezer Burgess, the minister of the Allin Congregational Church. Morse locates it as being "two miles west of the Court House." As of 2019, Burgess Lane is located 2.5 miles west of the Norfolk Superior Court.) It is suspected that this was because Nathaniel had given Richards more grandsons and thus would be in a better position to transmit the family name down through successively more prosperous generations.

Richards Street in Dedham was named for him.

== Works cited ==
- Morse, Abner (1861). A Genealogical Register of the Descendants of Several Ancient Puritans, V. 3: The Richards Family. H.W. Dutton.
- Worthington, Erastus (1827). The history of Dedham: from the beginning of its settlement, in September 1635, to May 1827. Dutton and Wentworth.
- Richards, Arthur Wescate (1942). Genealogy: the James Francis Richards branch of a Richards family of New England; that of Edward Richards, Dedham, Massachusetts, 1635-1684. Sarasota, Florida: Star Printing Company.
