= Norwood, Canton, and Sharon Street Railway =

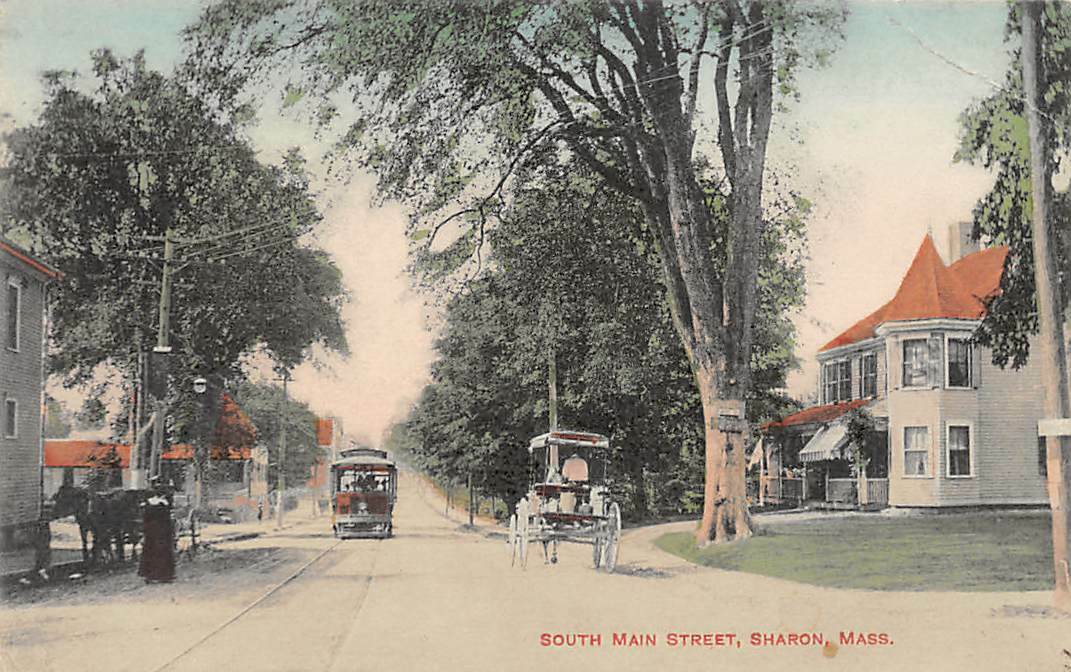
1912 postcard showing a Norwood, Canton and Sharon Street Railway car in Sharon

The Norwood, Canton, and Sharon Street Railway was an electrified street railway in Massachusetts that provided service between the towns in its name. It was incorporated in 1900 and ran its first cars in 1901. Service lasted until approximately 1920.

The line ran from Washington and Day streets in Norwood to the town line of Canton (on a bridge over the Neponset River). Cars then traversed the Blue Hill Street Railway Company's tracks until reaching the Sharon town line in East Sharon. From there, company tracks lead to Sharon Heights.

The company did not generate its own power instead purchasing it from the Blue Hill Street Railway. Management of the company was contracted out to the Norfolk and Bristol Street Railway Company.
