= Broad Oak (Dedham) =

Estate in Dedham, Massachusetts, United States

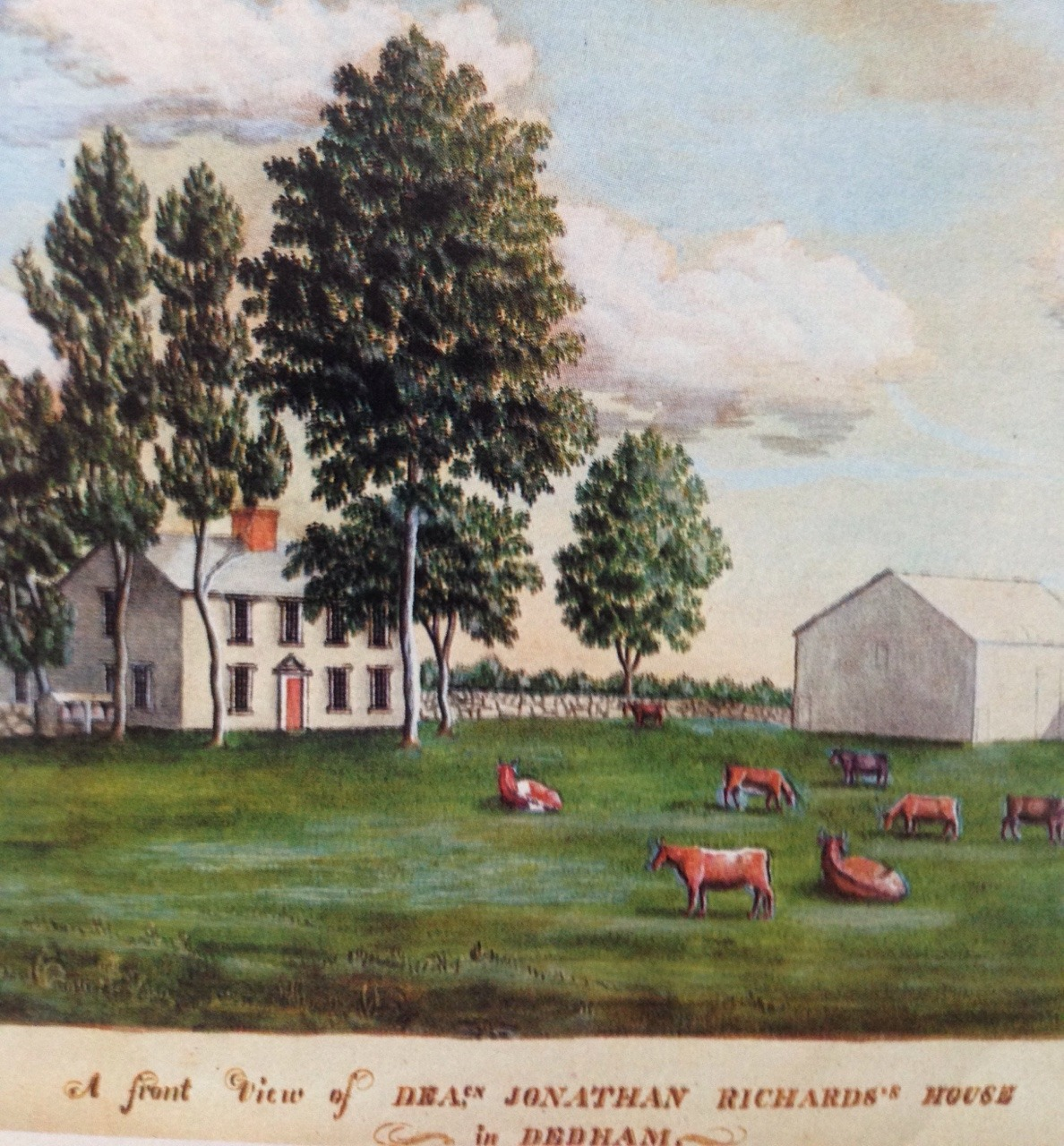
Broad Oaks in Dedham, Massachusetts

Broad Oak also known as Broad Oaks, was an estate in Dedham, Massachusetts owned by Edward Richards and his family, and then later Ebenezer Burgess and his descendants. Today the name lives on as part of the Broad Oak Farm which is located on part of the original estate.

== History ==
Though Dedham was intended to be a Utopian commune, and there was little disparity in wealth, Richards went by the title of "Gent" and, unlike others, aspired to a manor. He received large tracts of land, second only to the minister, John Allin. One such tract of land was originally owned by a Mr. Cook, who was probably from Watertown. After Cook's death, the land was sold by his estate to Anthony Fisher in 1652. The next year, Fisher sold it to Henry Phillips. This land eventually became Broad Oak.

Richards purchased the property sometime between 1653 and 1670 and, while no record exists recording the transfer, it is suspected it was closer to 1670. Early records of the town indicate that Richards was interested in building a "manor house" on his extensive land holdings. The Broad Oak estate and house were located northwest of the Dedham village, on a bend in the Charles River, off West Street near the present day border of Needham. (Note: Morse locates it as being "two miles west of the Court House." As of 2019, Burgess Lane is located 2.5 miles west of the Norfolk Superior Court. Broad Oak Farm, which was part of the original Broad Oak estate, is located one block away on Hale Drive.)

Edward Richards left the property to his son, Nathaniel, and Nathaniel left it to his son, Edward. It then passed down through generations of the Richards family, to Nathaniel, James, Ebenezer, and finally to Deacon Jonathan Richards. Jonathan sold it to his friend and minister, Rev. Ebenezer Burgess of the Allin Congregational Church. The land was surveyed in 1831 and a deed drawn up then, but it was not recorded until 1838. It is presumed that Jonathan Richards, a widower, may have lived on the land for a time after he sold it to Burgess. Burgess tore down the Richards home and built a new mansion on the lot in 1839. Burgess operated it as an "extensive cattle farm."

When a horse and buggy were stolen from the estate in 1904, the Society in Dedham for Apprehending Horse Thieves attempted to capture the criminal. As of 1942, some of the original Richards estate was still in the hands of Richards family. The Burgess family remained at Broad Oak at least until the 1940s when State Representative John K. Burgess lived there.

== Works cited ==
- Morse, Abner (1861). A Genealogical Register of the Descendants of Several Ancient Puritans, V. 3: The Richards Family. H.W. Dutton.
- Worthington, Erastus (1827). The history of Dedham: from the beginning of its settlement, in September 1635, to May 1827. Dutton and Wentworth. p. 29.
- Richards, Arthur Wescate (1942). Genealogy: the James Francis Richards branch of a Richards family of New England; that of Edward Richards, Dedham, Massachusetts, 1635-1684. Sarasota, Florida: Star Printing Company.`
