= Pumham =

Pumham (died 1676) (also known as Pomham) was one of Metacomet's chief advisors during King Phillip's War. He was sachem of Shawomet. He was described as "one of the stoutest and most valiant sachems that belonged to the Narragansett." He was friends with English settlers, but aligned himself with Metacomet when war broke out.

== Early life ==
Pumham was allied with the Massachusetts Bay colony, who claimed the lands of Shawomet, today Warwick, Rhode Island. The colony forbid anyone to live there without permission, and built a fort there to protect the area, the remains of which were still visible in 2000. (Note: A marker designating the site was erected, but has since been stolen.) This fort was built on the site of Pumham's village.

== King Phillip's War ==
As tensions mounted, Pumham began encouraging defiance, and not peace, with the colonists. During the war, Pumham used the fort Shawomet.

On July 4, 1675, Governor John Leverett sent Edward Hutchinson to sign a treaty with the Narragansets whereby they would agree not to harbor any of Metacomet's people. Hutchinson decided "to treat with the Narragansets sword in hand," and forced Pumham to sign on July 15. Pumham and his people ignored the treaty as soon as the colonists left.

Pumham was captured in Dedham, Massachusetts on July 25, 1676. (Note: Ellis and Morris have the date as July 27.) Several Christian Indians had seen his band in the woods, including his son and other family members, nearly starved to death. Captain Samuel Hunting (Note: The son of John Hunting.) led 36 men from Dedham and Medfield and joined 90 Indians on a hunt to find them. A total of 15 of the Ponham's band were killed and 35 were captured. Pumham, with a bullet in his back and so wounded he could not stand, hid in the bushes with this hatchet. He grabbed hold of an English soldier and would have killed him had one of the settler's compatriots not come to his rescue. Pumham died in the fight.

== Works cited ==
- Hanson, Robert Brand (1976). Dedham, Massachusetts, 1635-1890. Dedham Historical Society.
- Ellis, George William; Morris, John Emery (1906). King Philip's War: Based on the Archives and Records of Massachusetts, Plymouth, Rhode Island and Connecticut, and Contemporary Letters and Accounts, with Biographical and Topographical Notes. Grafton Press. ISBN 9783849672157.
- Schultz, Eric B.; Tougias, Michael J. (2000). King Philip's War: The History and Legacy of America's Forgotten Conflict. The Countryman Press. ISBN 9780881504835.
- Church, Thomas (1999). The History of Philip's War: Commonly Called the Great Indian War of 1675 and 1676. Digital Scanning Inc. ISBN 9781582181301.
- "Pomham And His Fort". Rhode Island Historical Society Collections. XI (1): 31–36. January 1918.
