= Ebenezer Burgess =

Clergy from Dedham, Massachusetts

Ebenezer Burgess (April 1, 1790 – December 5, 1870) was the minister of the Allin Congregational Church in Dedham, Massachusetts.

== Personal life ==
Burgess was born on April 1, 1790, in Wareham, Massachusetts. He was graduated from Brown University in 1809, and at the Andover Theological Seminary in 1814. In 1835, he received a doctorate in divinity from Middlebury College.

On May 22, 1823, Burgess was married to Abigail Bromfield Phillips, the daughter of Lt. Governor William Phillips Jr. He and his family lived in the Broad Oak estate. (Note: Morse locates it as being "two miles west of the Court House." As of 2019, Burgess Lane is located 2.5 miles west of the Norfolk Superior Court. Broad Oak Farm, which was part of the original Broad Oak estate, is located one block away on Hale Drive.) Burgess tore down the Richards home and built a new mansion on the lot in 1839. Burgess operated it as an "extensive cattle farm."

Besides three who died in childhood, they had four children: Miriam Mason, Ebenezer Prince, Edward Phillips, and Martha Crowell. Burgess became the possessor of considerable wealth and was known for his benevolence. He was an ancestor of John K. Burgess and, through Abigail, the uncle of Samuel H. Walley.

He was elected a resident member of the New England Historic Genealogical Society in 1862. He died December 5, 1870, in Dedham and is buried in the Old Village Cemetery. His gravestone is notable for the level of detail it includes about his life.

== American Colonization Society ==
He accompanied Rev. Samuel J. Mills to Africa, as an agent of the American Colonization Society, to explore the western coast of that continent, and joined the colony of Liberia. They sailed from Philadelphia on November 1, 1817, and Burgess arrived home again October 22, 1818. On their homeward voyage, Mills was taken sick and died, and his associate performed for him the last offices and committed his remains to the ocean. He maintained his association with the society throughout his ministry.

== Career ==
He taught in the high school at Providence, Rhode Island one year; was tutor in Brown University from 1811 to 1813, and professor of mathematics and natural philosophy in the University of Vermont from 1811 to 1817.

He was the founder and president of the Dedham Institution for Savings.

== Ministry ==
Following a schism at the First Church and Parish in Dedham, and the accompanying lawsuit, Baker v. Fales, Burgess was ordained pastor of the Allin Congregational Church on March 14, 1821.

In the run up to the Civil War, "he did not support the anti-slavery movement" and segregated the pews in the church by race. When a visiting southern clergyman was traveling through the area, Burgess would often invite him to preach. Congregants were sometimes offended by what the visiting preacher had to say. However, when President Joseph Jenkins Roberts of Liberia would visit the United States, he would frequently preach from the Allin pulpit.

William Jenks, a pastor from Green Street in Boston, would spend the summers in Dedham. Burgess would invite him to stand on his left during services and Jenks would lead the "long prayer."

He was a firm believer in the evangelical system of faith. His preaching was distinguished for breadth and comprehensiveness, rather than for pointedness and closeness of application.

Burgess was "strict in his denominationalism" and did not associate with the other ministers in the town. Unlike many of the others, he did not serve on the Dedham School Committee. If a congregant died, but owned a pew in another church, Burgess would not share in the funeral duties.

When John Wade was sentenced to death for arson at the Phoenix Hotel, Burgess intervened on his behalf and helped get it commuted to life imprisonment.

Burgess resigned active pastoral duties on March 13, 1861.

== Published works ==
In 1840, he published The Dedham Pulpit, a volume of five hundred pages and, in 1860, the Burgess Genealogy, a 200-page tome chronicling the descendants of Thomas Burgess, of Plymouth Colony.

== Legacy ==
The Burgess Schoolhouse, also known as District Number 11 and the Westfield School District, was located on Westfield Street near Schoolmaster Lane. The simple one story building had red shutters and plank seats with no backs. A new schoolhouse, named in honor of Burgess, was built around 1840 and sold 1899.

Burgess Lane in Dedham was named for him.

== Works cited ==
- Clarke, Wm. Horatio (1903). Mid-Century Memories of Dedham. Dedham Historical Society.
- Slafter, Carlos (1905). A Record of Education: The Schools and Teachers of Dedham, Massachusetts 1644-1904. Dedham Transcript Press. "1642-3."
- Dedham Historical Society (August 11, 2001). Images of America: Dedham. Arcadia. ISBN 9780738509440.
- Hanson, Robert Brand (1976). Dedham, Massachusetts, 1635-1890. Dedham Historical Society.
- Morse, Abner (1861). A Genealogical Register of the Descendants of Several Ancient Puritans, V. 3: The Richards Family. H.W. Dutton.
- Richards, Arthur Wescate (1942). Genealogy: the James Francis Richards branch of a Richards family of New England; that of Edward Richards, Dedham, Massachusetts, 1635-1684. Sarasota, Florida: Star Printing Company.`
