= Dorchester-Milton Lower Mills Industrial District =

Historic district in Massachusetts, United States

- U.S. National Register of Historic Places
- U.S. Historic district
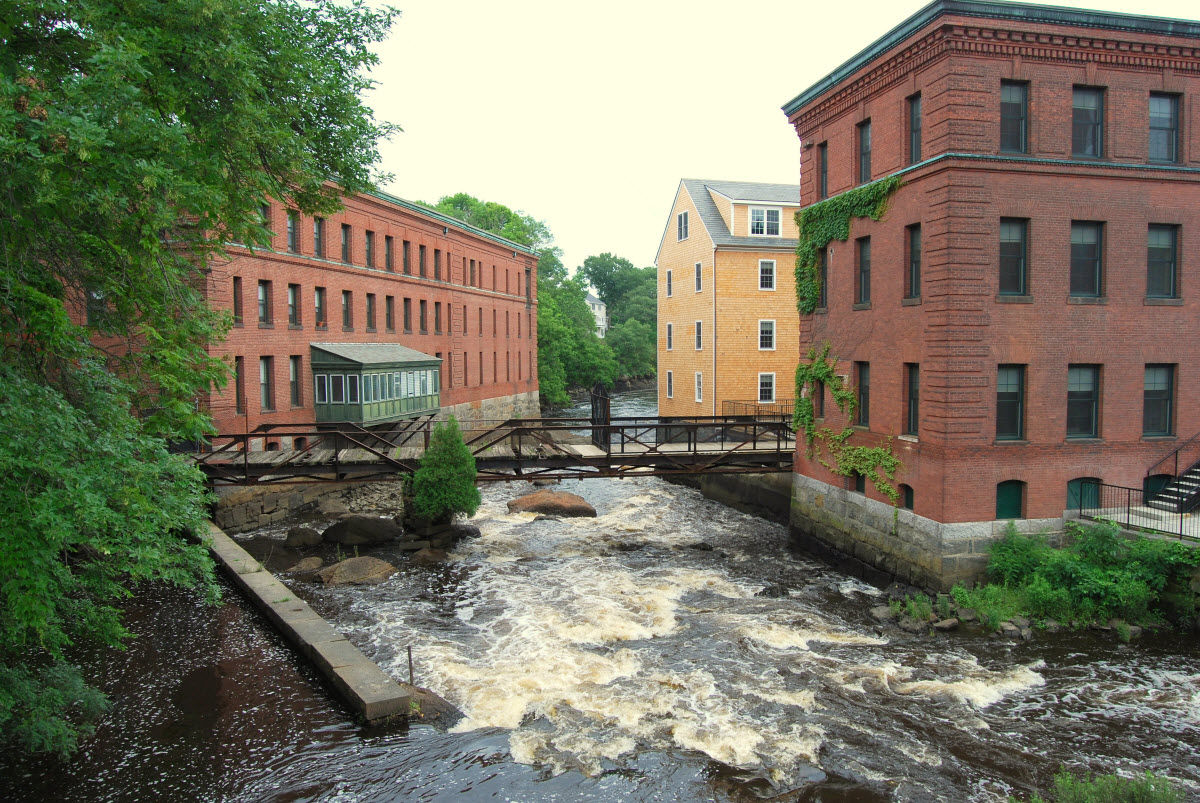
- Neponset River at Lower Mills

- Location within Massachusetts Location within the United States
- Location: Boston, Massachusetts
- Coordinates: 42°16′16″N 71°4′8″W
- Area: 5 acres (2.0 ha)
- Built: 1868
- Architects: Bradlee, Winslow & Wetherell; et al.
- Architectural style: Colonial Revival, Other, Romanesque
- NRHP reference No.: 80000675 (original); 01000304 (increase)

Significant dates
- Added to NRHP: April 2, 1980
- Boundary increase: April 6, 2001

The Dorchester-Milton Lower Mills Industrial District is a historic district on both sides of the Neponset River in the Dorchester area of Boston and in the town of Milton, Massachusetts. It encompasses an industrial factory complex, most of which was historically associated with the Walter Baker & Company, the first major maker of chocolate products in the United States. The industrial buildings of the district were built between about 1868 and 1947. They were listed as part of the district on the National Register of Historic Places in 1980, with a slight enlargement in 2001. The buildings have been adapted for mixed industrial/retail/residential use.

== Description ==
Lower Mills Village is located on either side of the Neponset River, which demarcates the southern boundary of Boston and the northern boundary of Milton. The river is crossed by Adams Street, which roughly bisects the district. The district is bounded on the south by the MBTA rail right-of-way in Milton and River, Washington, and Adams Streets in Dorchester.

The historic district includes sixteen industrial buildings, all but one of which were directly associated with Water Baker & Company. Most of the buildings are constructed of brick, with numerous additions and ells. They are stylistically diverse, having been built between 1868 and 1947, reflecting styles from the Second Empire to the Queen Anne, Romanesque Revival, and utilitarian modern.

== History ==
Native Americans have lived in this area for thousands of years. Members of the Massachusett tribe in this area encountered English colonists in the 17th century. They occupied parcels of land near what is today the Ventura Street Playground in the Neponset River Reservation and Dorchester Park. In the early 1630s Israel Stoughton acquired land to build a grist mill for grinding corn. Later chocolate factory buildings were built on that site. In 1637 early settler John Whipple, an apprentice to Stoughton, settled on land near Butler and Bearse streets.

Chocolate-making in the immediate area has a history dating to the mid-18th century, when Dr. James Baker and John Hannan established the business in 1765. The company they founded grew to national prominence in the first half of the 19th century under Walter Baker, James Baker's grandson. Additional expansion took place in the late 19th century, when a major portion of the present complex was built beginning in 1868 under the leadership of Henry Pierce; it continued under his successor, H. Clifford Gallagher. In 1926 the company was acquired by General Foods, which continued to manufacture chocolate under the Baker name on these premises until 1965. That year it consolidated operations at a plant in upstate New York.

== See also ==
- National Register of Historic Places listings in Milton, Massachusetts
- National Register of Historic Places listings in southern Boston, Massachusetts
