= Quentin Stockwell =

Quentin Stockwell was an early American colonist. He was one of the first settlers of Dedham, Massachusetts and then Deerfield, Massachusetts.

While in Dedham, he lived near the saw mill in what is today Walpole, Massachusetts. His wife, Abigail, was a first cousin of Mary Bullard, the wife of John Farrington. Both families were early residents of Dedham and Deerfield.

== King Phillip's War ==
After moving to Deerfield, the village was destroyed in King Phillip's War. While attempting to rebuild his farm, he was taken captive with 24 others by the native peoples and marched to Canada.

He was set to be burned at the stake and, on the night before his execution, was sent to gather wood for the pyre. While doing so he discovered his captors were sleeping, and carefully gathered their weapons to kill them all with his fellow prisoners. He lost his nerve, however, and put all the weapons back where he found them. His master chose not to execute him. He had a second opportunity to kill his captors when he was left with a sick guard. Fearing for the safety of those left behind, he did not.

After being ransomed, his wrote an account of his experiences that was published by Increase Mather.

== Works cited ==
- Corlett, David Michael (2011). Steadfast in their ways: New England colonists, Indian wars, and the persistence of culture, 1675-1715 (PhD dissertation). College of William & Mary. doi:10.21220/s2-3p7s-st69. Paper 1539623344.
- Hanson, Robert Brand (1976). Dedham, Massachusetts, 1635-1890. Dedham Historical Society.
