= Green Hill Site =

- U.S. National Register of Historic Places
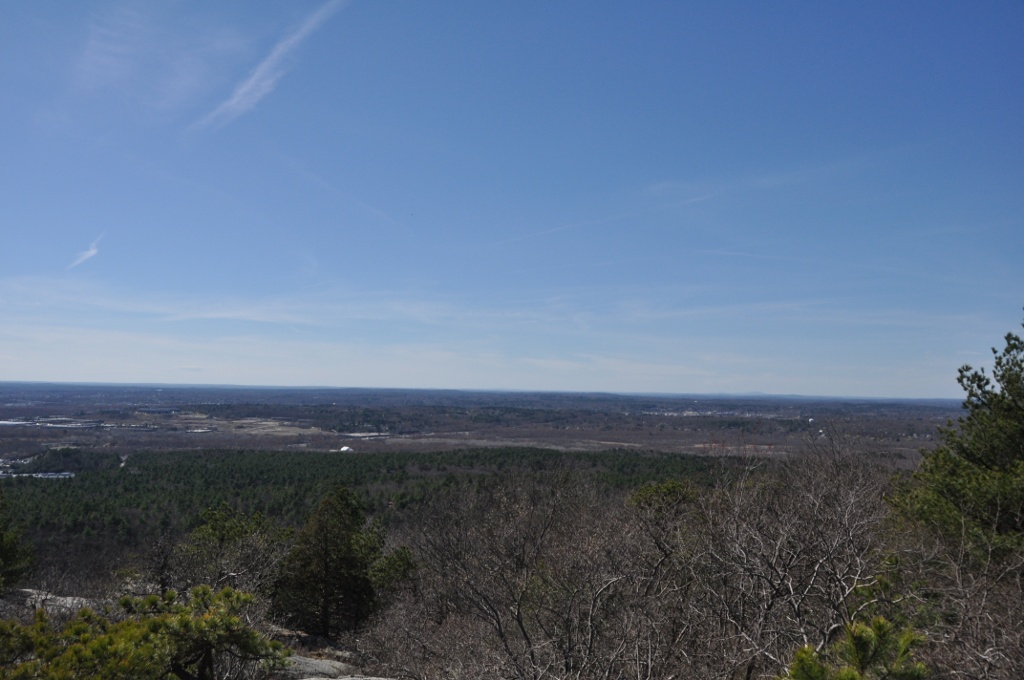
- The site is located near the Neponset River, which is on the far side of Little Blue Hill, pictured here.
- Nearest city: Canton, Massachusetts
- MPS: Blue Hills and Neponset River Reservations MRA
- NRHP reference No.: 80000651
- Added to NRHP: September 25, 1980

The Green Hill Site is a prehistoric archaeological site in Canton, Massachusetts. It is located near the Neponset River, extending upland for a distance of about 500 feet (150 m) up to the crest of Green Hill, an elevation of about 110 feet (34 m). This area has been repeatedly excavated since the 1960s. The site encompasses a Middle to Late Archaic period encampment, where Neville style projectile points, gouges for woodworking, and a stone-working worksite have been found.

The site was added to the National Register of Historic Places in 1980.

== See also ==
- National Register of Historic Places listings in Norfolk County, Massachusetts
