= Neponset Reservoir =

Reservoir in Foxborough, Massachusetts, USA; headwater of the Neponset River

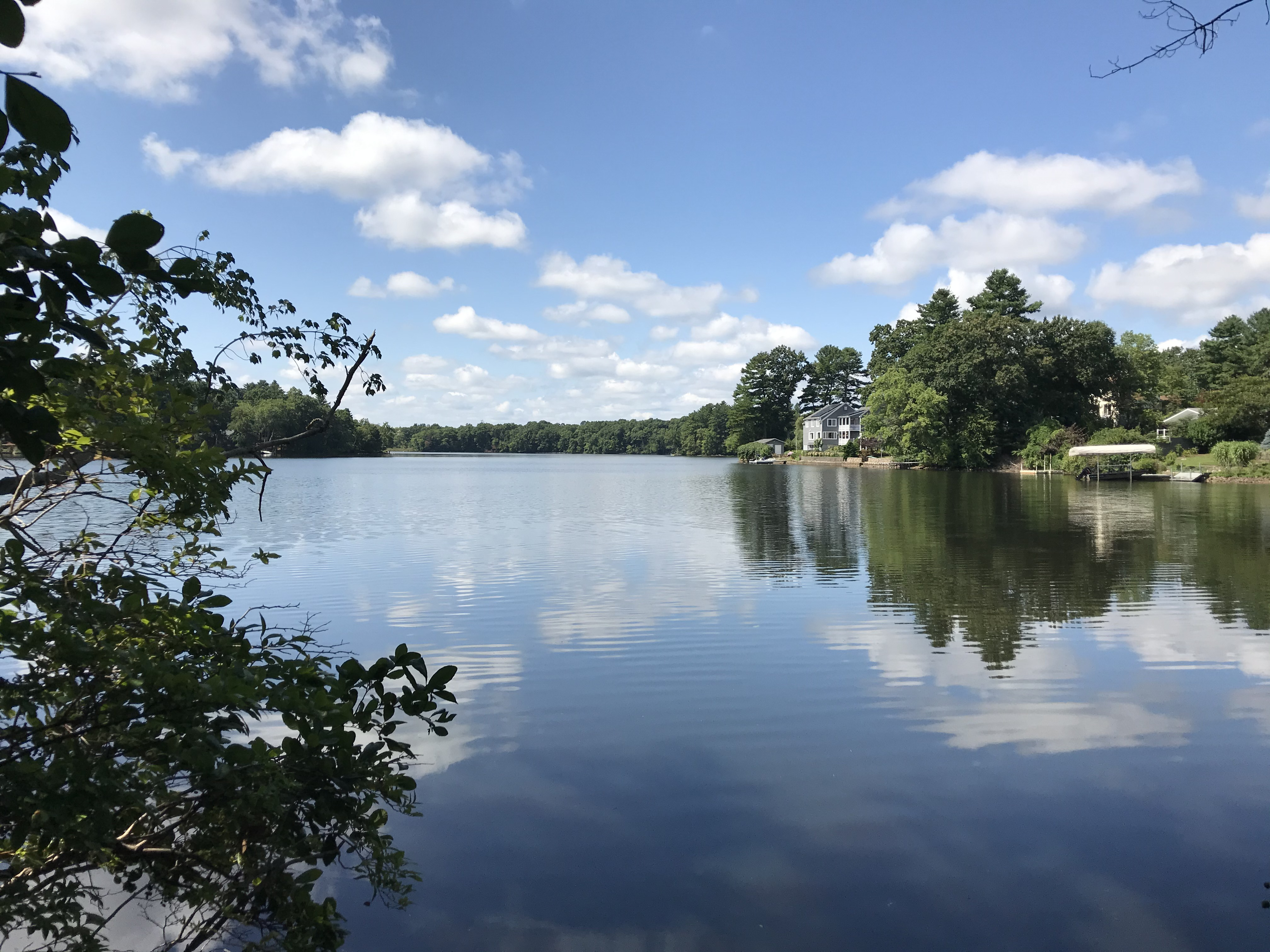
- Neponset Reservoir

- Location within Massachusetts Location within the United States
- Location: Foxborough, Massachusetts
- Coordinates: 42°5′7.59″N 71°14′50.38″W
- Type: reservoir
- Primary outflows: Neponset River
- Basin countries: United States
- Surface elevation: 266 ft (81 m)

The Neponset Reservoir is a reservoir located in Foxborough, Massachusetts that is the headwater of the Neponset River that runs to Boston Harbor. The reservoir dates from the mid-1800s, and was originally used by mills downstream for water power.
