= Israel Stoughton =

- Born: c. 1603; England
- Died: 1644 (aged 40–41) Lincoln, England
- Conflicts: Pequot War Fairfield Swamp Fight
- Spouse: Elizabeth
- Children: William Stoughton

Israel Stoughton (c. 1603 – 1644) was an early English colonist in Massachusetts and a colonial commander in the Pequot War. Returning to England, he served as Parliamentarian officer in the First English Civil War.

== Life ==
Coat of Arms of Israel Stoughton

Born in England, a younger brother of John Stoughton, Stoughton emigrated to the Massachusetts Colony in 1630. He settled at Dorchester near Richard Callicott's trading post. Stoughton was admitted as a freeman at Dorchester on 5 November 1633. In 1634 Stoughton was allowed to build the first mill on the Neponset River in what is now the Dorchester-Milton Lower Mills Industrial District. Stoughton was chosen as a representative for Dorchester in the Massachusetts General Court in 1634 and 1635. Stoughton had several apprentices and servants, including John Whipple.

During the height of the Antinomian Controversy in the colony, Stoughton wrote a book that attacked the colony's constitution. The book offended some members of the General Court, which barred Stoughton from holding any colony offices for three years. Stoughton later petitioned that the book be ‘forthwith burnt, as being weak and offensive.’ Despite this reversal, the General Court maintained their ban until 1636. In 1637, the General Court allowed Stoughton to become an assistant.

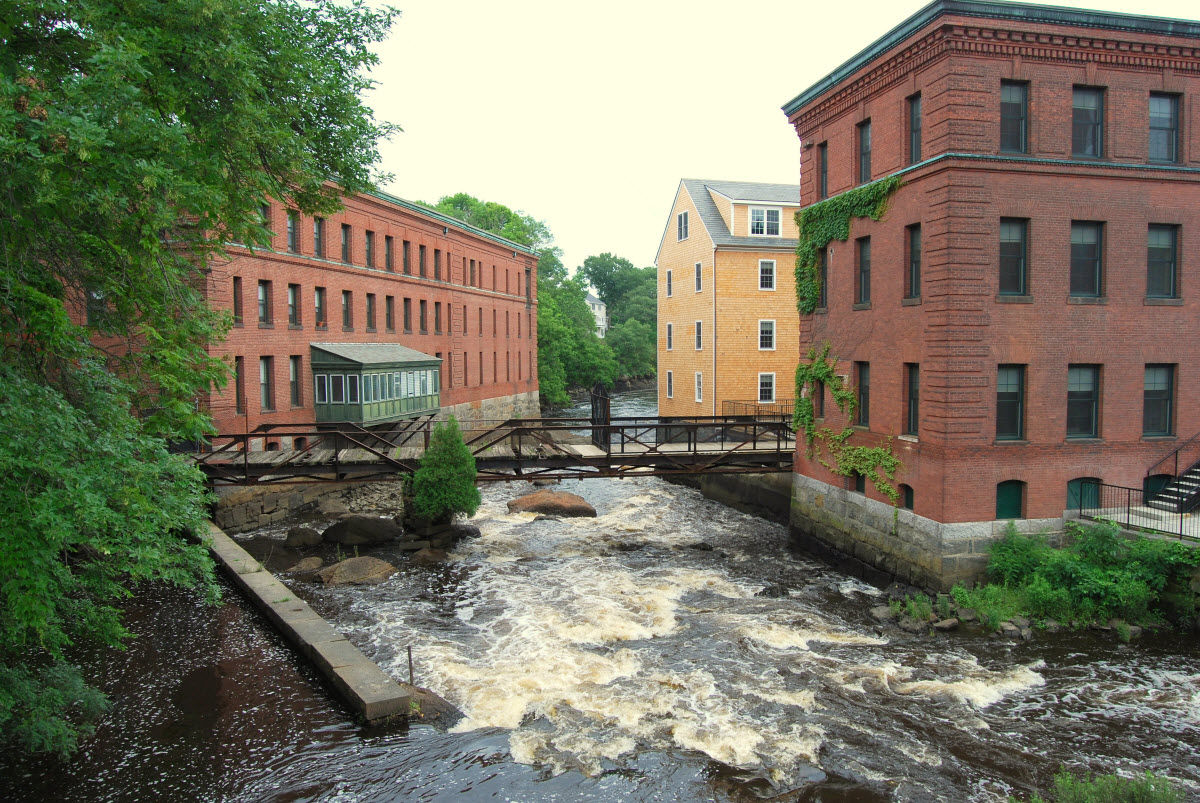
Dorchester-Milton Lower Mills Industrial District where Stoughton's Mill was located on the Neponset River

In 1636, war broke out between the Pequot tribe and the three New England colonies and their Native American allies. Appointed commander of the Massachusetts Colony militia, Stoughton reportedly employed brutal tactics against the Pequots. In 1637 Stoughton transported Pequot prisoners to Massachusetts to serve as servants, and Stoughton requested "the fairest and largest" of the Pequot female prisoners to be his servant. He also had African American slaves or servants, including the well-known, Dorcas ye blackmore, who joined the First Parish Church of Dorchester in 1641, and evangelized Native American servants and eventually attempted to gained her freedom with the help of the local church congregation.

In 1639 Stoughton and John Endecott acted as commissioners on behalf of Massachusetts Colony to settle a boundary dispute with Plymouth Colony.

He gave a lease for a pasture to the residents of Dedham, Massachusetts for their cattle to graze.

Toward the end of 1643, Stoughton made a brief trip to England, returning home by the beginning of 1644. In late 1644 he went to England again, never to return to Massachusetts.

With the advent of the First English Civil War, the English Parliament appointed Stoughton as a lieutenant colonel in their army. Stoughton died very soon afterwards in Lincoln.

Stoughton's children included William Stoughton, best known as the chief magistrate of the Salem witch trials in Massachusetts.
