= Samuel Hunting =

Military officer

Captain Samuel Hunting (July 22, 1640 – August 19, 1701) was a military officer from Massachusetts who served in King Phillip's War.

== Personal life ==
Hunting was born July 22, 1640, to John Hunting and his wife, Esther. He married Hannah (Note: The daughter of Samuel and Catharine Hackborne.) on December 24, 1662. The couple had ten children, but only three survived childhood. The couple moved to Chelmsford and then Charlestown. Hunting served as a selectman in Charlestown in 1690. He accidentally shot and killed himself on August 19, 1701, in Charlestown.

== King Phillips War ==
During King Phillip's War, Hunting raised a company of Christian Indians to fight alongside the English settlers. They mustered in Charlestown, but that town was never attacked and they marched to Chelmsford instead. When word came that Sudbury had been attacked on April 21, 1676, they responded, arriving at night and "performed efficient service." In that same month, following orders from Governor John Leverett, Hunting and Lt. James Richardson erected a garrison at Pawtucket Falls to protect the residents there.

Pomham, one of Phillip's chief advisors, was captured in Dedham on July 25, 1676. Several Christian Indians had seen his band in the woods, nearly starved to death. Hunting led 36 men from Dedham and Medfield and joined 90 Indians armed with guns from England on a hunt to find them. Hunting praised the native warriors, who came from Natick, saying "the said Indians behaved themselves courageously and faithfully to the English interest." A total of 15 of the enemy were killed and 35 were captured. Pomham, though he was so wounded he could not stand, grabbed hold of an English soldier and would have killed him had one of the settler's compatriots not come to his rescue.

Hunting and his men played a large role in bringing the war to an end. In the summer of 1676, his men captured or killed 400 enemy soldiers.

== Works cited ==
- Hanson, Robert Brand (1976). Dedham, Massachusetts, 1635-1890. Dedham Historical Society.
- Ellis, George William; Morris, John Emery (1906). King Philip's War: Based on the Archives and Records of Massachusetts, Plymouth, Rhode Island and Connecticut, and Contemporary Letters and Accounts, with Biographical and Topographical Notes. Grafton Press.
- Bodge, George Madison (1906). Soldiers in King Philip's War: Being a Critical Account of that War, with a Concise History of the Indian Wars of New England from 1620-1677. Connecticut.
