= Richard Ellis (Massachusetts politician) =

American politician

Richard Ellis represented Dedham, Massachusetts in the Great and General Court.

Ellis, along with Timothy Dwight, served as the agent of the Town when negotiating with King Phillip for title to the land today known as Wrentham, Massachusetts in 1660. At the time he was a sergeant in the militia. He served as a selectman for nine terms, beginning in 1673. In 1661 he was elected as Town Clerk, but he refused to serve.

== Works cited ==
- Worthington, Erastus (1827). The History of Dedham: From the Beginning of Its Settlement, in September 1635, to May 1827. Dutton and Wentworth.
- Dwight, Benjamin Woodbridge (1874). The History of the Descendants of John Dwight, of Dedham, Mass. J. F. Trow & son, printers and bookbinders. p. 102.
- Hanson, Robert Brand (1976). Dedham, Massachusetts, 1635-1890. Dedham Historical Society.
