= Avery Oak =

Oak tree in Dedham, Massachusetts

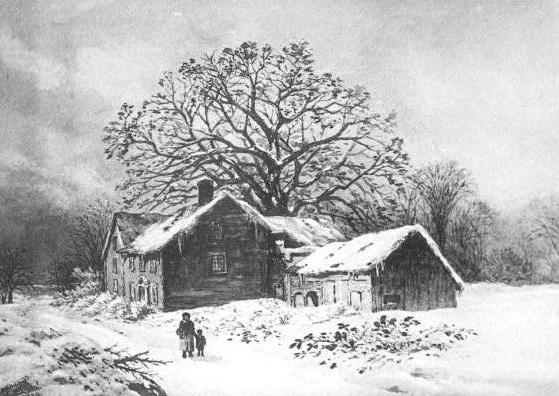
The home of William Avery, and the Avery Oak.

The Old Avery Oak Tree was a white oak tree that stood in Dedham, Massachusetts until it was knocked down in 1972. It had a circumference of over 20 ft (6 m) and stood on East Street near the Fairbanks House. It was named for Jonathan Avery, the owner of the tree, who had an estate that was bounded roughly by East Street, Mt. Vernon Street, Barrows Street, and Brookdale Avenue. The Avery family was one of the early settlers of Dedham, arriving in 1650.

By the time the first settlers arrived in Dedham in 1635, the tree was already quite old. It was owned by the Dedham Historical Society after being donated by J.W. Clark in 1886. Clark, who owned the house where the tree was located, also donated a square of land around it extending seven and a half feet from three sides of it, and to East Street on the fourth. The deed also allowed the roots and branches to grow over and under Clark's land.

Today, wood from the tree is used in the chairman of the Board of Selectmen's and the Town Meeting Moderator's gavel. The gavel was designed and carved by Edward F. Snow Sr., whose family were long-time residents. Historical Society president Henry Hildreth also commissioned a chair to be built from the timber. The tree also lives on in the seal adopted by the Town in 1878, and that of the Dedham-Westwood Water District.

== Storms ==
In the terrible winter of 1723, when the snow lay so thick over the landscape that the residents could not access their woodlot, another Avery chopped off the top of the tree to keep his family from freezing. By the 1790s, the Avery Oak’s gnarled and crooked branches spread more than 90 feet from a trunk five feet in diameter.

Although over 450 other trees, on public land alone, were felled by the New England Hurricane of 1938, the Avery Oak survived. It was struck by lightning, however, and a limb at the top was knocked off.

The tree lived until late July 1972, when a strong thunderstorm toppled it. Then-police chief Walter Carroll was driving down East Street when it toppled, and the tree very nearly struck his car. Hundreds of people gathered to see the fallen tree, and the police protected it while the Historical Society made plans for how to dispose of it. The tree was estimated to be over 450 years old.

== USS Constitution ==
Samuel Nicholson, the first captain of the Constitution, was living in Dedham at the time the ship was being built. The Avery Oak at that time had limbs full of crooks and angles, which Lord Bacon called knee timber, and which was particularly required in ship building. Its massive trunk would also have yielded a good quantity of planking.

Designer Joshua Humphreys specified white oak for the hull of the USS Constitution. Timber merchants from New Jersey to Maine scrambled to find old growth trees that had the straight trunks needed to cut long runs of plank, but also crooks and bends that could supply the hundreds of hanging, standing, and lodging knees needed to support deck beams.

The ship builders, presumably Nicholson, made several offers to buy the tree, eventually rising to "the unheard of price of $70," but the owner would not sell. Local legend contends that it was Avery's wife who spared the tree.
