= Peter Prudden =

Peter Prudden (1601–1656) was an English Puritan who assisted in the foundation of Milford, Connecticut. After education at the Merchant Taylors' School, he was a student at Emmanuel College, Cambridge. He arrived in Boston, Massachusetts on June 26, 1637 with John Davenport and Theophilus Eaton. After Davenport and Eaton formed New Haven Colony, Prudden and a small group of settlers purchased a tract of land called Wepawaug from local Native Americans. Prudden was ordained as the first pastor of the Congregationalist church at Milford on April 8, 1640. He is buried in Milford, Connecticut.

He was invited with several of his followers to settle in Dedham, Massachusetts, but declined the invitation. They had offers to settle in other places as well, including in Plymouth Colony, and were seeking to build a community that was both spiritually and commercially successful.

== See also ==
- Connecticut Colony
