= Ezekiel Holliman =

American church founder (c. 1586–1769)

Ezekial Holliman (c. 1586 – 17 September 1679) was a founder of the First Baptist Church in America.

== Boston ==
Holliman ran into trouble while living in Boston when he ran afoul of the prevailing religious sensibilities of the time. He was accused of heresy, but left town before legal actions were initiated. He presumably thought that moving into the frontier would allow him a greater sense of religious liberty and so became one of the earliest settlers of Dedham, Massachusetts.

== Dedham ==
The original settlers of Dedham met for the first time on August 18, 1636, in Watertown. By September 5, 1636, their number grew from 18 at the first meeting to 25 proprietors willing to set out for the new community. By November 25, however, so few people had actually moved to Dedham that the proprietors voted to require every man to move to Dedham permanently by the first day of the following November or they would lose the land they had been granted. A few young men without families set off to spend the winter there, including Holliman. He is one of two who were known to have been there as he and Nicholas Phillips were caught illegally cutting down trees in the new community. They incurred heavy fines for their infractions.

In the early days, decisions were made by consensus in town meeting. Holliman felt he had been wronged by the Town when they fined him for illegally cutting down trees and covering his house in clapboard. He began boycotting public meetings in protest.

On July 18, 1637, the Town voted to admit a group of dogmatic Puritans that would radically change the course of the town's history. Holliman recognized that as a religious liberal that he was not going to be welcome among them. In July 1637, he sold his land in Dedham and moved on. By 1866, his land in Dedham would house the First Church and Parish in Dedham, the Allin Congregational Church, St. Paul's Church, and the first free public school in America.

== Rhode Island ==
After leaving Dedham, Holliman settled in Rhode Island where he was welcomed by Roger Williams. The two men baptized each other and founded the First Baptist Church in America.

== Works cited ==
- Hanson, Robert Brand (1976). Dedham, Massachusetts, 1635–1890. Dedham Historical Society.
- Hopkins, Charles Wyman (2009). The Home Lots of the Early Settlers of the Providence Plantations: With Notes and Plats. Genealogical Publishing Com. ISBN 978-0-8063-4680-9.
