= Henry Phillips (politician) =

American colonial politician

Henry Phillips (died 1685) was a wealthy businessman and politician from Boston and Dedham, Massachusetts. Phillips was described as "tender and brokenhearted."

== Life in Dedham ==
Phillips moved from Boston to Dedham in 1637, two years after the town was first settled and one year after it was incorporated. He was a member of the church and a militia officer. Though he received "better than average" dividends of land, he complained in 1656 that too many people had been admitted to the town commons, diluting the value of his interest. He led a group of dissatisfied settlers in a rare public complaint. He brought his complaint before the General Court, which was an action even more rare in a community whose covenant called for disputes to be resolved by local mediation. He served one term as selectman in 1645. He briefly owned the land that came to be known as Broad Oak.

He had a brother, Nicholas, who also lived in Dedham, and was likely related to Rev. George Phillips of Watertown.

== Life in Boston ==
Upset about the distribution of the land, Phillips returned to Boston in 1656. There he became a deacon at First Church in Boston and a delegate to the Great and General Court of Massachusetts. He also worked as a butcher. His death in 1685 was mentioned in Samuel Sewall's diary.

== Works cited ==
- Lockridge, Kenneth (1985). A New England Town. New York: W.W. Norton & Company. ISBN 978-0-393-95459-3.
- Worthington, Erastus (1827). The history of Dedham: from the beginning of its settlement, in September 1635, to May 1827. Dutton and Wentworth.
- Hanson, Robert Brand (1976). Dedham, Massachusetts, 1635-1890. Dedham Historical Society.
