= William Avery (Massachusetts politician) =

American politician

Coat of Arms of William Avery

William Avery (circa 1622 (Note: Avery was about 61 years old in 1683.)-March 18, 1686) represented Dedham, Massachusetts, in the Great and General Court. He was also a selectman, serving eight terms beginning in 1664.

Avery was a blacksmith, medical doctor, and original proprietor of Deerfield, Massachusetts. Avery was the first educated physician in Dedham, though it is not known when exactly he began practicing. (Note: There was an earlier doctor in Dedham, Dr. Henry Deengains, but he left for Roxbury within months of arriving in Dedham in 1638.) He sold some land to Joshua Fisher.

He was a member of the First Church and Parish in Dedham. Avery built his house next to the Old Avery Oak, which was named for his family.

With his wife, Margret, he emigrated from England. After her death in 1678 he moved to Boston where he became a bookseller. His second wife was Mrs. Mary Tapping (née Woodmansey). She died in 1707. He had a son, also named William, who was a blacksmith. With his wife, Margret, he emigrated from England. After her death in 1678 he moved to Boston where he became a bookseller.

Avery died on March 18, 1686, and is buried at the King's Chapel Burying Ground. For having donated £60 to establish a Latin school in Dedham, the Avery School was named for him.

== Works cited ==
- Carter, Jane Greenough Avery; Holmes, Susie Perry (1893). Genealogical Record of the Dedham Branch of the Avery Family in America. Press of Avery & Doten. pp. 19–34.
- Smith, Frank (1936). A History of Dedham, Massachusetts. Transcript Press, Incorporated.
- Worthington, Erastus (1827). The history of Dedham: from the beginning of its settlement, in September 1635, to May 1827. Dutton and Wentworth. p. 29.
- Fisher, Phillip A. (1898). The Fisher Genealogy: A Record of the Descendants of Joshua, Anthony, and Cornelius Fisher, of Dedham, Mass., 1630-1640. Massachusetts Publishing Company. ISBN 978-0-608-32125-7.
