= Neponset River =

River in eastern Massachusetts, United States

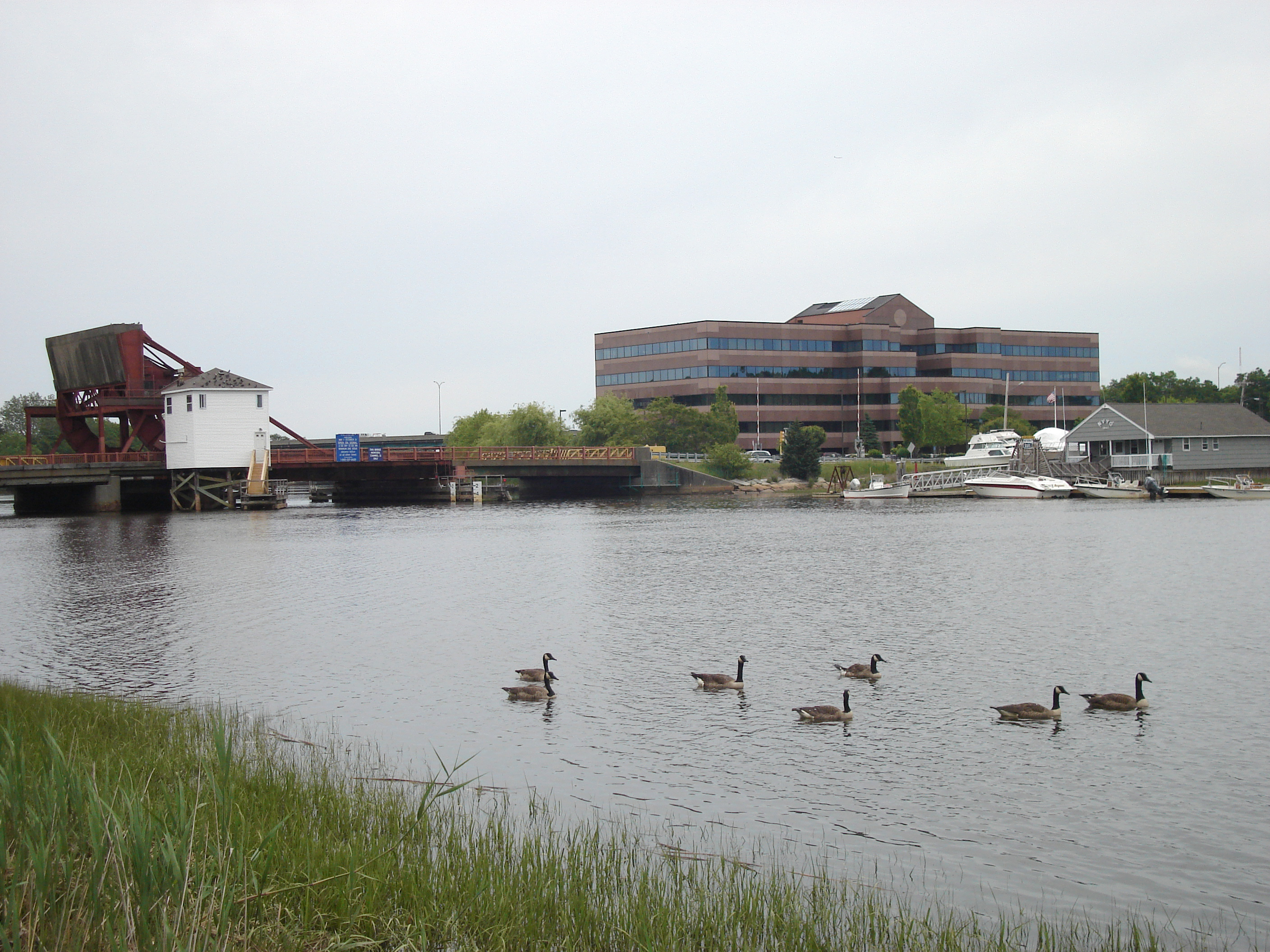
- Neponset River with Granite Avenue in background
- Interactive map of the Neponset River

Location
- Country: United States
- State: Massachusetts

Physical characteristics
- Source: Neponset Reservoir
  - location: Foxborough, Massachusetts, United States
  - coordinates: 42.086°N 71.244°W
- Mouth: Dorchester Bay
  - location: Massachusetts
  - coordinates: 42.300°N 71.042°W
- Length: 29 mi (47 km)

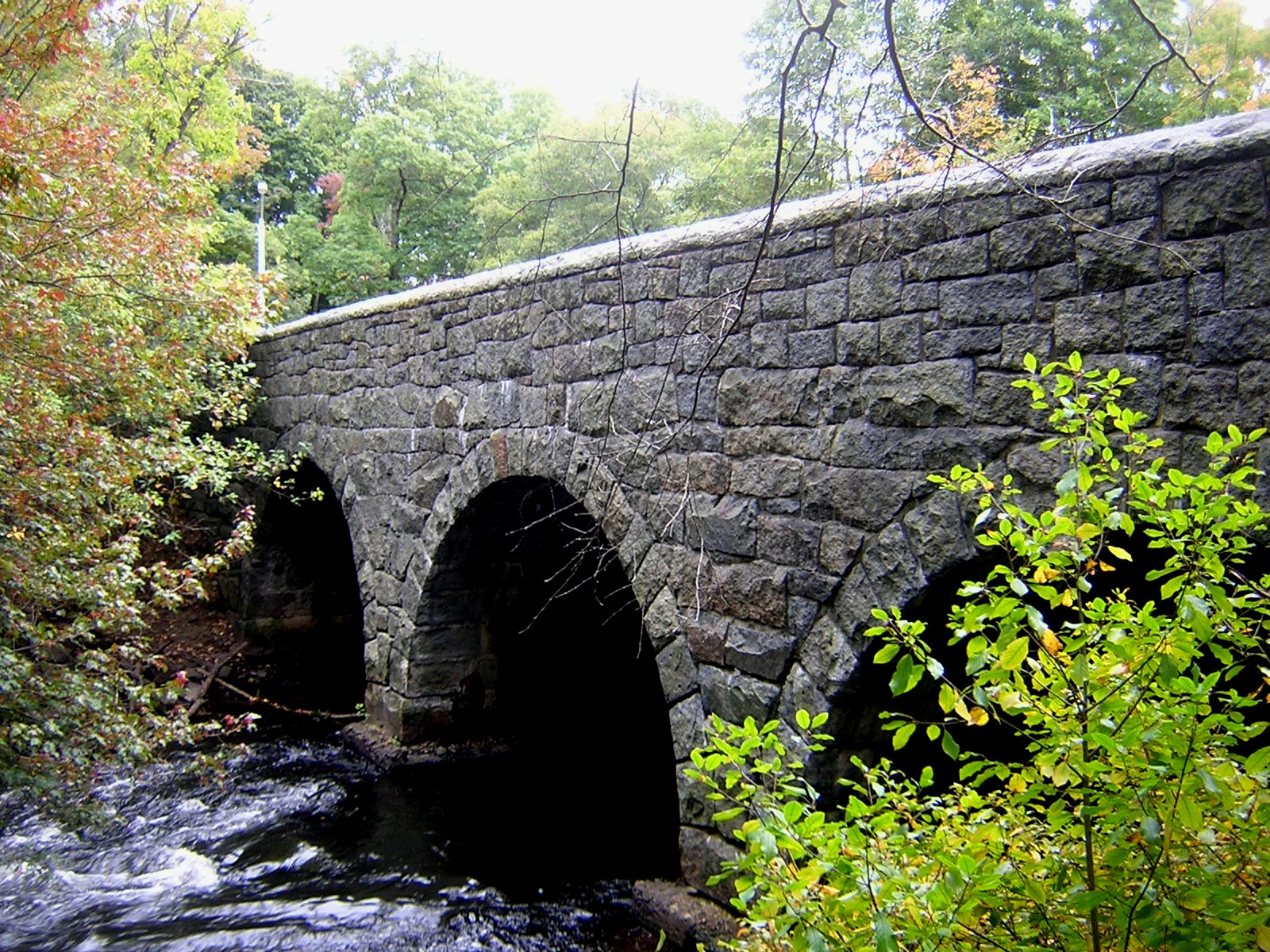
Paul's Bridge, Milton and Boston Massachusetts, crossing the Neponset River, the border between the two.

The Neponset River is a river in eastern Massachusetts in the United States. Its headwaters are at the Neponset Reservoir in Foxborough, near Gillette Stadium. From there, the Neponset meanders generally northeast for about 29 miles (47 km) to its mouth at Dorchester Bay between Quincy and the Dorchester section of Boston, near the painted gas tank.

The Neponset River forms the southern boundary of the city of Boston, passing through the neighborhoods of Readville, Hyde Park, Mattapan and Dorchester, and forms the northern border of the city of Quincy. In addition, the Neponset touches the towns of Foxborough, Walpole, Sharon, Norwood, Canton, Stoughton, Westwood, Dedham, and Milton.

The Neponset River is fed by a drainage basin of approximately 130 square miles, a watershed that includes numerous aquifers, wetlands, streams, and surrounding upland areas. Some 250,000 people live in the Neponset River watershed, which in addition to the towns listed above, includes portions of Stoughton, Medfield, Dover, and Randolph.

The Canton River, a tributary of the Neponset River, is located in Canton, Massachusetts. It flows under the Canton Viaduct.

== Ecology ==
The Neponset River supports a variety of migratory and resident fish species typical of coastal rivers in Massachusetts. Anadromous species documented in the river include alewife (Alosa pseudoharengus), blueback herring (Alosa aestivalis), and American shad (Alosa sapidissima). Resident fish species include white perch, bluegill, American eel, chain pickerel, pumpkinseed, largemouth bass, common carp, fallfish, red-breasted sunfish, spot tail shiner, and white sucker. Rainbow smelt (Osmerus mordax) have also been recorded in the stretch below the Walter Baker Dam in the Lower Mills section of Dorchester. Efforts to restore fish passage and improve water quality in the Neponset River watershed have helped support the return and seasonal migration of several anadromous fish species.

== History ==
Before Europeans arrived, the area was inhabited by Algonquian-speaking Native American tribes. The Wamsutta site (19-NF-70) is a Paleo-Indians site, which was dated to 10210 ± 60 BP). Evidence of habitation along the Neponset River also includes the Middle Archaic (ca. 5000 BC) at sites such as Green Hill near the Blue Hills.

The river's recorded history begins in 1619 when Native Americans traveled down the Neponset River to Thompson's Island, where they traded furs with English settlers.

The falling waters of the Neponset provided the energy for the country's first water-powered grist mill, gunpowder mill, paper mill and the Revere Copper Company, among others.

The upper stretch of the Neponset River, in Foxborough, Walpole and Norwood, is steeply sloped, dropping about 228 feet (69 m) over its first 12 miles, (19 km) and so the earliest years of the Industrial Revolution brought the Neponset to prominence. In 1635, Israel Stoughton built the first dam on the Neponset (only the second dam in the entire New World) for his grist mill. It was the first of three mills for flour, gunpowder and paper making.

In 1639, English settlers in Dedham began digging a canal connecting the Charles River with Mother Brook, a tributary of the Neponset, in order to provide their town with water power for mills; it was the first man-made canal in North America and increased the water flow in the lower sections of the Neponset. In 1640, shipbuilding began at Gulliver's Creek Wharf, and in 1673 John Trescott built a lumber mill on the river.

In 1765, a chocolate mill was established by Dr. James Baker and Irish immigrant John Hannon (later known as Walter Baker & Company producing Baker's Chocolate) in the Lower Mills section of Dorchester, and in 1770 Daniel Vose's Wholesale Shipping Warehouses at the second Milton Town Landing at Lower Mills were at the peak of their operation. Ship building and commercial shipping were the major river industries at the estuary. In 1773, George Clark built a paper mill on remnants of Trescott's Lumber Mill, which became the Tileston and Hollingsworth Paper Mill in 1836. In 1826, the river became the terminus of the Granite Railway, the first commercial railway in the United States. This river was central to the establishment of the town of Walpole. The river now flows through the Dorchester-Milton Lower Mills Industrial District.

The stretch of the Neponset from Milton to Dorchester Bay was referred to as Milton River on some early maps.

About 2,000 feet (610 m) of the river was placed in conduits during construction of the Foxboro Raceway and later Foxboro Stadium. During the construction of Gillette Stadium, the river was relocated to the edge of the property (adjacent to the Framingham Secondary) and daylit.

In 2021, the United States Environmental Protection Agency recommended 3.7 miles of the Lower Neponset River be added to the National Priorities List of the Superfund program, due to industrial pollution with PCBs. In March 2022, the EPA placed the segment between Mother Brook in Hyde Park to the Lower Mills on the National Priorities List.

The Bipartisan Infrastructure Law, formally known as the Infrastructure Investment and Jobs Act and enacted in 2021, allocated $3.5 billion to the Superfund Remedial Program and reinstated the Superfund chemical excise taxes that help finance hazardous waste cleanups. According to the United States Environmental Protection Agency (EPA), the additional funding expanded the agency's capacity to address contaminated sites across the country, enabling it to initiate remedial action at 49 previously unfunded locations and accelerate cleanup efforts nationwide. The investment also supported the agency's broader efforts to remediate polluted waterways and industrial sites, including locations added to the Superfund program.

== Neponset River Reservation ==
Today the Neponset River and its watershed are increasingly being protected and opened up as a recreational destination for the benefit of local residents. Several recommendations of the 1966 Lower Neponset River Reservation Master Plan have been implemented, including the reclamation of the former Hallet Street landfill and the old Neponset Drive-In to provide the 66-acre (270,000 m^{2}) Pope John Paul II Park, which opened to the public in 2001. At Squantum Point in Quincy, phase one of Squantum Point Park, 25 acres (100,000 m^{2}) of a 50-acre (200,000 m^{2}) former U.S. Navy Airfield, was developed as waterfront parkland with assistance from National Grid plc and dedicated in the spring of 2001.

== In popular culture ==
The Neponset River figures in the movie Black Mass, referencing an area south and east of the Keystone Shoreline in Dorchester, Massachusetts on the north bank, underneath the area where the Interstate 93 / Southeast Expressway / Route 1 bridge spans the river. A character in the movie makes reference to the area as "Bulger's Burial Ground", where crime boss James "Whitey" Bulger had the bodies of several of his murder victims buried. That unmarked burial ground really did exist, but in actuality was approximately one mile north of the area referenced in the film, near Tenean Beach in the Dorchester Shores Reservation.

2.4 miles (3.9 km) of the Lower Neponset River Trail opened in 2003. The trail follows the former right-of-way of the Dorchester and Milton Branch Railroad, the western part of which is also used by the MBTA Mattapan Line.

The Gillette Stadium Lighthouse is the largest lighthouse-type structure in America. While the structure is located next to the Neponset River, the Gillette Stadium Lighthouse is not a government-recognized lighthouse because the Neponset River is not a federally controlled water way in Foxborough, as it is less than 2 miles wide. Gillette Stadium Lighthouse stands at 218 feet tall and 22 stories high.
