= Canton, Massachusetts =

Town in Massachusetts, United States

- Town
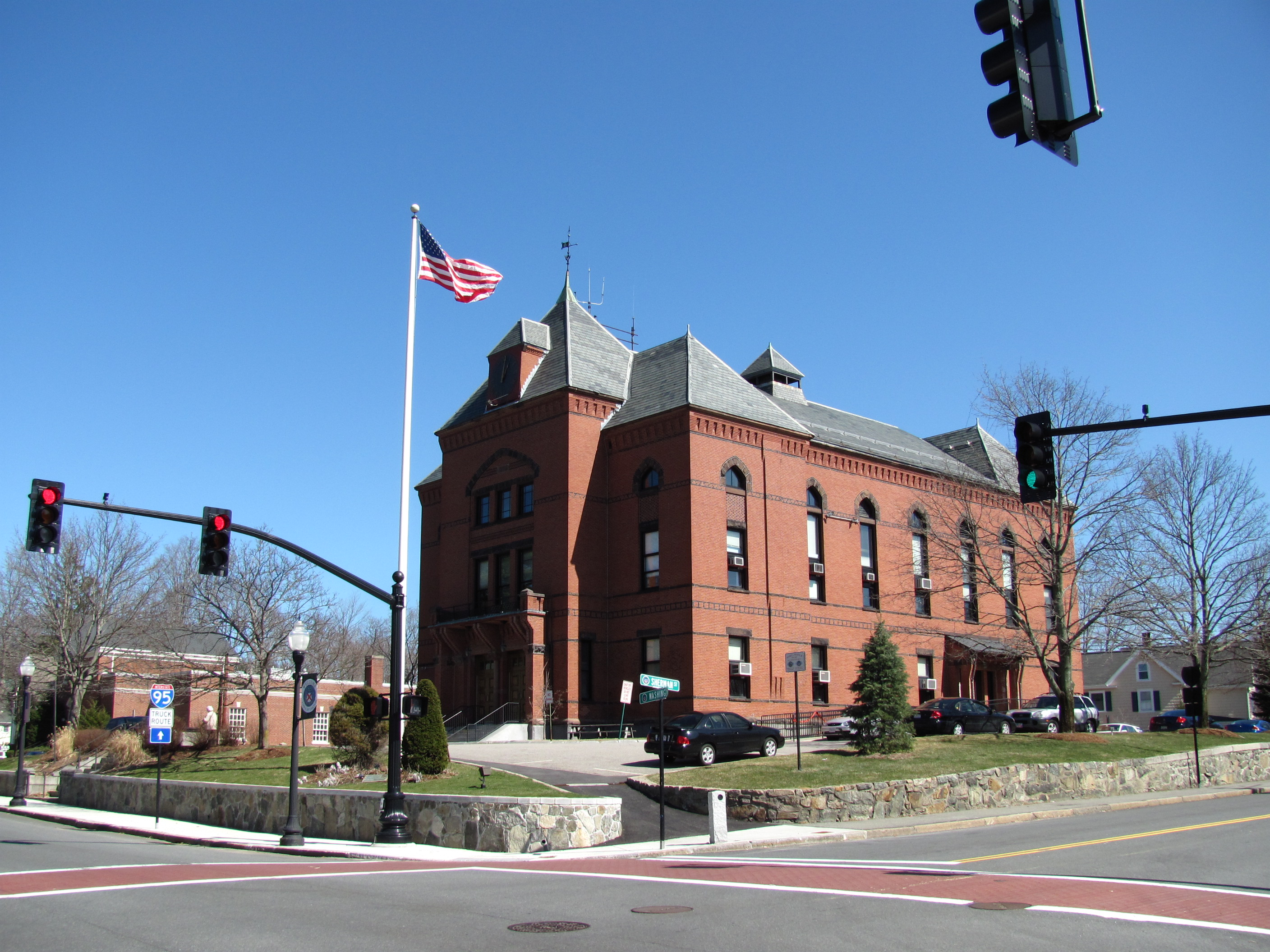
- Town Hall

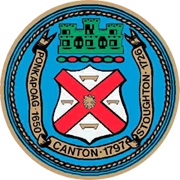
- Seal
- Motto: Ense Petit Placidam Sub Libertate Quietem
- Location of Canton in Norfolk County
- Coordinates: 42°09′30″N 71°08′43″W
- Country: United States
- State: Massachusetts
- County: Norfolk
- Settled: 1630
- Incorporated: 1797

Government
  - Type: Open town meeting
  - Town Administrator: Charles Doody

Area
  - Total: 19.6 sq mi (50.7 km^{2})
  - Land: 18.9 sq mi (49.0 km^{2})
  - Water: 0.66 sq mi (1.7 km^{2})
- Elevation: 98 ft (30 m)

Population (2020)
  - Total: 24,370
  - Density: 1,288/sq mi (497.3/km^{2})
- Time zone: UTC−5 (Eastern)
  - Summer (DST): UTC−4 (Eastern)
- ZIP Code: 02021
- Area code: 781/339
- FIPS code: 25-11315
- GNIS feature ID: 0619457
- Website: www.town.canton.ma.us

Canton is a town in Norfolk County, Massachusetts, United States. The population was 24,370 at the 2020 census. Canton is part of Greater Boston, about 15 miles (24 kilometers) southwest of Downtown Boston.

== History ==
The area that is present-day Canton was inhabited for thousands of years prior to European colonization. The Paleo-Indian site Wamsutta, radiocarbon dated to 12,140 years before present, is located within the bounds of modern-day Canton at Signal Hill.

At the time of the Puritan migration to New England in the early 1600s, Canton was seasonally inhabited by the Neponset band of Massachusett under the leadership of sachem Chickatawbut.

From the 1630s to the 1670s, increasing encroachment by year-round English settlers on lands traditionally inhabited only part of the year, devastating virgin soil epidemics, and English colonial policy pushed native people in to Praying Towns, a precursor to modern day Indian reservations.

The modern town of Canton was the site of Ponkapoag, the second Praying Town in the Massachusetts Bay Colony, which was set off from Dorchester in 1657, three years after English colonists resettled a group of Nemasket there from Cohannet, modern day Taunton. The so-called Praying Indians that settled in Ponkapoag are known today as the Massachusett Tribe at Ponkapoag.

In 1674, King Philip's War led to significant depopulation of Ponkapoag, which found itself on the fault lines of one of the bloodiest conflicts in North American history, and in October 1675 those Praying Indians that remained were forcibly removed to Deer Island by order of the Massachusetts General Court. After the war, in part because of the loss of life and the fleeing of native refugees north to join the Wabanaki Confederacy, the General Court disbanded 10 of the original 14 towns in 1677 and placed the remaining four, including Ponkapoag, under the supervision of colonists.

Over the next 100 years, while Ponkapoag remained an official entity, the loss of self-determination and privatization of collective lands led to the gradual intermixing of native and settler populations in the area.

In 1726, Stoughton, Massachusetts, split from the large original territory of Dorchester; then on February 23, 1797, Canton was officially incorporated from the territory of Stoughton. The name "Canton" was suggested by Elijah Dunbar and comes from a belief that Guangzhou, China, was antipodal to it. This is not possible, since they are both well north of the Equator; they are, however, about 2 degrees from being antipodal in longitude, ignoring latitude. In addition to being a prominent Canton citizen, Elijah Dunbar was the first president of the Stoughton Musical Society from 1786 to 1808. Now named the Old Stoughton Music Society, it is the oldest choral society in the United States.

Paul Revere built the nation's first copper rolling mill in Canton in 1801. His poem entitled Canton Dale expresses his affection for the town. Canton was the location of the Rising Sun Stove Polish Company, founded by Elijah Morse, a wealthy merchant and creator of the pot-belly stove.

== Commerce ==
Canton is the headquarters of Dunkin' Donuts, Computershare (North American HQ), Organogenesis, Inc., Boston Mutual Life Insurance Company, Bank of Canton, Interpolymer Corporation, Casual Male Retail Group, and formerly Tweeter. It is also home to the Massachusetts Division headquarters of the Salvation Army.

=== Top employers ===
According to the town's 2022 Annual Comprehensive Financial Report, the top employers in the city are:

#	Employer	# of Employees
1	Dunkin' Brands	633
2	Computershare	540
3	Meditech	504
4	Destination XL Group	446
5	FIS Global	350
6	Stoneridge Control Devices (Pollak)	255
7	Boston Mutual Insurance	229
8	Pappas Rehabilitation Hospital	220
9	Gray, Gray and Gray LLP	107
10	Bank of Canton	104

== Geography ==
According to the United States Census Bureau, the town has an area of 19.6 square miles (51 km^{2}), of which 18.9 square miles (49 km^{2}) is land and 0.6 square miles (1.6 km^{2}) (3.27%) is water.

Canton lies at the foot of Great Blue Hill. The Canton River flows through the center of the town, linking a chain of small lakes including Bolivar and Forge Ponds and flowing into the Neponset River. The Neponset River forms the boundary between Canton and its western neighbors: Norwood, Westwood, and Dedham. In addition to wooded land, the area includes wetlands, particularly in the eastern part along Route 138 near the Randolph and Stoughton borders, and in the western part along I-95.

Canton borders the towns of Dedham, Milton, Norwood, Randolph, Sharon, Stoughton, Westwood, and Boston's Hyde Park neighborhood.

Climate data for Blue Hills Reservation (Blue Hill Meteorological Observatory), 1991−2020 normals, extremes 1893−present
Month	Jan	Feb	Mar	Apr	May	Jun	Jul	Aug	Sep	Oct	Nov	Dec	Year
Record high °F (°C)	68 (20)	71 (22)	89 (32)	94 (34)	96 (36)	99 (37)	100 (38)	101 (38)	99 (37)	88 (31)	81 (27)	74 (23)	101 (38)
Mean maximum °F (°C)	56.6 (13.7)	56.9 (13.8)	65.6 (18.7)	79.4 (26.3)	87.3 (30.7)	90.0 (32.2)	92.9 (33.8)	91.3 (32.9)	86.9 (30.5)	77.6 (25.3)	68.4 (20.2)	60.0 (15.6)	94.7 (34.8)
Mean daily maximum °F (°C)	34.7 (1.5)	37.0 (2.8)	44.1 (6.7)	56.3 (13.5)	66.8 (19.3)	75.4 (24.1)	81.7 (27.6)	80.2 (26.8)	72.7 (22.6)	61.0 (16.1)	50.1 (10.1)	40.2 (4.6)	58.4 (14.6)
Daily mean °F (°C)	26.5 (−3.1)	28.2 (−2.1)	35.5 (1.9)	47.1 (8.4)	58.5 (14.7)	66.5 (19.2)	72.7 (22.6)	71.4 (21.9)	64.2 (17.9)	52.5 (11.4)	42.0 (5.6)	32.5 (0.3)	49.8 (9.9)
Mean daily minimum °F (°C)	18.3 (−7.6)	19.5 (−6.9)	26.9 (−2.8)	37.9 (3.3)	48.2 (9.0)	57.6 (14.2)	63.8 (17.7)	62.6 (17.0)	55.6 (13.1)	44.0 (6.7)	33.8 (1.0)	24.9 (−3.9)	41.1 (5.1)
Mean minimum °F (°C)	0.0 (−17.8)	3.1 (−16.1)	10.1 (−12.2)	26.7 (−2.9)	37.5 (3.1)	45.9 (7.7)	54.9 (12.7)	53.4 (11.9)	42.3 (5.7)	30.5 (−0.8)	19.6 (−6.9)	8.7 (−12.9)	−2.5 (−19.2)
Record low °F (°C)	−14 (−26)	−21 (−29)	−5 (−21)	6 (−14)	27 (−3)	36 (2)	44 (7)	39 (4)	28 (−2)	21 (−6)	5 (−15)	−19 (−28)	−21 (−29)
Average precipitation inches (mm)	4.50 (114)	4.00 (102)	5.52 (140)	4.76 (121)	3.82 (97)	4.63 (118)	3.47 (88)	3.91 (99)	4.06 (103)	5.49 (139)	4.31 (109)	5.39 (137)	53.86 (1,367)
Average snowfall inches (cm)	18.6 (47)	18.2 (46)	15.0 (38)	2.8 (7.1)	0.0 (0.0)	0.0 (0.0)	0.0 (0.0)	0.0 (0.0)	0.0 (0.0)	0.7 (1.8)	1.8 (4.6)	12.6 (32)	69.7 (176.5)
Average extreme snow depth inches (cm)	10.6 (27)	11.5 (29)	9.8 (25)	2.6 (6.6)	0.0 (0.0)	0.0 (0.0)	0.0 (0.0)	0.0 (0.0)	0.0 (0.0)	0.3 (0.76)	1.3 (3.3)	7.7 (20)	17.1 (43)
Average precipitation days (≥ 0.01 in)	13.2	11.3	12.5	12.5	13.0	12.1	10.5	10.2	9.2	11.5	10.9	12.6	139.5
Average snowy days (≥ 0.1 in)	8.1	7.1	5.7	1.3	0.0	0.0	0.0	0.0	0.0	0.4	1.3	5.3	29.2
Mean monthly sunshine hours	132.1	146.7	174.0	185.6	220.2	231.8	258.1	242.5	204.1	182.1	133.3	125.9	2,236.4
Percentage possible sunshine	46.3	50.9	48.5	47.9	50.4	52.7	58.0	58.7	56.7	55.1	47.0	45.9	51.5
Source 1: NOAA
Source 2: BHO

== Demographics ==
Historical population
Year	Pop.	±%
1850	2,598	—
1860	3,242	+24.8%
1870	3,879	+19.6%
1880	4,516	+16.4%
1890	4,538	+0.5%
1900	4,584	+1.0%
1910	4,797	+4.6%
1920	5,945	+23.9%
1930	5,816	−2.2%
1940	6,381	+9.7%
1950	7,465	+17.0%
1960	12,771	+71.1%
1970	17,100	+33.9%
1980	18,182	+6.3%
1990	18,530	+1.9%
2000	20,775	+12.1%
2010	21,561	+3.8%
2020	24,370	+13.0%
2024*	25,163	+3.3%
* = population estimate. Source: United States census records and Population Estimates Program data.

As of the 2010 census, there were 21,561 people, 7,952 households, and 5,550 families residing in the town. The population density was 1,097.3 inhabitants per square mile (423.7/km^{2}). There were 8,163 housing units at an average density of 431.1 per square mile (166.4/km^{2}). The racial makeup of the town was 81.6% White, 6.6% African American, 0.1% Native American, 7.5% Asian, 0.02% Pacific Islander, 0.51% from other races, and 2.1% from two or more races. Hispanic or Latino of any race were 3.9% of the population. 79.7% of the population was non-Hispanic white in 2010, down from 98.0% in 1980.

There were 7,952 households, out of which 30.9% had children under the age of 18 living with them, 58.4% were married couples living together, 8.9% had a female householder with no husband present, and 30.2% were non-families. Of all households, 25.4% were made up of individuals, and 12.3% had someone living alone who was 65 years of age or older. The average household size was 2.56 and the average family size was 3.12.

In the town, the population was spread out, with 23.6% under the age of 18, 5.6% from 18 to 24, 29.9% from 25 to 44, 24.0% from 45 to 64, and 16.9% who were 65 years of age or older. The median age was 40 years. For every 100 females, there were 89.4 males. For every 100 females age 18 and over, there were 85.2 males.

The median income for a household in the town was $109,260, and the median income for a family was $132,904. Males had a median income of $52,216 versus $40,755 for females. The per capita income was $43,510. About 5.2% of families and 7.2% of the population were below the poverty line, including 4.7% of those under age 18 and 9.5% of those age 65 or over.

== Education ==
Canton has three public elementary schools: the John F. Kennedy School, Lt. Peter M. Hansen School, and Dean S. Luce School. The area in which one lives determines which elementary school one's children attend.

Canton has one public middle school, the William H. Galvin Middle School, where all of the three elementary schools combine. It provides grades 6–8 and is next to the Lt. Peter M. Hansen Elementary School. Canton also has a public high school, Canton High School, that provides grades 9–12. There is one private school, St. John the Evangelist, which has been open since 1883 and serves students in grades Preschool–8. In addition, the state's Pappas Rehabilitation Hospital for Children, formerly known as the Massachusetts Hospital School, is in Canton. The Marilyn G. Rodman Educational and Administrative Center is next to Canton High School, housing administrative buildings as well as a preschool.

The Blue Hills Regional Technical School and the Canton campus of Massasoit Community College are within the town. Porter and Chester Institute also has a campus in Canton.

Clarke Schools for Hearing and Speech, formerly Clarke School for the Deaf, operates a satellite school, "Clarke Boston", in Canton for children who are diagnosed with deafness at an early age and then are mainstreamed to a public school. Clarke is the oldest school for the deaf in the country that teaches children to lip-read and speak orally, rather than use sign language; its main campus is 80 miles to the west in Northampton.

The Judge Rotenberg Educational Center is housed in Canton.

CHS Awards

- Canton High Boys Varsity Hockey team won the Division II State Championships at TD Garden in Boston in 2010, 2019, 2020, 2023 and 2026.
- 2019 Girls Volleyball Division II State Champions
- 2011 Hockomock Davenport Champions in Field Hockey, Girls Soccer, Volleyball, Boys Soccer
- 2011 Hock Golf Championships: 1st Place
- 2011 Hockomock Classic Cup Champions in Field Hockey, Girls Soccer, Boys Soccer
- 2011 South Sectional Champions in Field Hockey & Girls Soccer
- 2014 EMASS Champions: Girls Soccer
- Also, The CHS Math Team is one of the top teams in their league.

== Government ==
Canton has the open town meeting form of government. Annually each spring, and as necessary, the voters gather to discuss matters such as zoning, schools, public works, recreational facilities, the budget, taxes and bond issues.

Property taxes on residential and other land, buildings and improvements, and transfers from the state government, are two important sources of revenue for the town.

=== Boards and Committees ===
The Select Board oversees the day-to-day operations of the town government. There are five positions on the Canton Select Board currently filled by John J. Connolly (Vice-chair), Michael C. Loughran (Clerk), Patricia M. Boyden (Member), Christopher M. Albert (Member), and John R. McCourt (Member).

The Town Administrator follows rules set by the Select Board and oversees all town services and responsibilities controlled by the board. They act as the key liaison between elected officials, municipal departments, and the community. The current Town Administrator is Charles E. Doody.

The Planning Board approves new town subdivisions, reviews site plans for commercial development, oversees the towns scenic ways, drafts and approves a town wide master plan, and statutorily provides recommendations to Town Meeting regarding zoning and development.

The Finance Committee studies the financial affairs of the town, advises and makes recommendations to the Town Meeting on the budget and other areas with fiscal implications and serves as the fiscal watchdog for the voters.

Canton maintains an Executive Office, responsible for maintenance and implementation of all policies and procedures, updating the administrative code and all legal, personal and town wide planning matters. The Executive Office consists of: Town Administrator, Human Resources, Town Counsel and Town Planner.

=== Public Safety ===
For public safety needs, the Town of Canton is protected by the Canton Fire Department and Canton Police Department. The Norfolk District Attorney, Michael W. Morrissey and the Norfolk State Police Detective Unit are located in Canton.

==== Fire Department ====
There are two fire stations in Canton: Headquarters Station 1 and Ponkapoag Station 2.

==== Police Department ====
The Canton Police Department was officially formed in 1875, with four men working limited part-time hours. In 1900, the first Chief of Police was appointed and served in the role for 11 years. A motorcycle officer was added in 1928.

In 1978, Elizabeth A. Galvin became the town's first female police officer.

In May 2004, a new police station was opened in the former Eliott School building on Washington Street. The original reconstruction project cost $5.9 million to renovate the 150-year-old building and then required additional repairs shortly after the grand opening, when the floor began to buckle due to weight.

In June 2022, Helena Rafferty was sworn in as the town's 14th Chief of Police and first female Chief of Police. She previously served as the Deputy under retiring Chief Ken Berkowitz, who had been in the role since 2005.

In November 2023, residents voted for an independent audit of the Canton Police Department due to the ongoing investigation into the case of the 2022 death of John O'Keefe, an officer in the Boston Police Department. The vote passed by a 903–800 margin during a Special Town Meeting on November 20, 2023. The results of the audit showed no wrongdoing by the department during the investigation of O'Keefe's death.

== Transportation ==
Interstates 93, 95, US Route 1 and Massachusetts Route 128 diverge in Canton. I-93 goes east, then north into Boston, from which it continues north into New Hampshire. I-95 is locally a beltway that skirts Boston to the west, continues circling Boston until it is north of the city, then goes north through New Hampshire and ends in Maine. South of Canton, it leads to Providence, Rhode Island, Connecticut, New York City, Washington, D.C. and ultimately to Miami, Florida.

Route 138 has a cloverleaf interchange with Route 93 in Canton near Great Blue Hill. From Canton, it goes north into Milton, then enters Boston in the Mattapan section. South of Canton, it travels to Stoughton, continuing into Rhode Island, through Newport and ending in southwestern RI.

Route 24 is a divided, limited-access highway that originates at Route 93 in Randolph, just east of Canton. From there, it goes south through the easternmost corner of Canton, running roughly parallel to Route 138 as far as Portsmouth, Rhode Island.

MBTA commuter rail trains on the Providence/Stoughton Line pass through Canton. Some stop at Canton Junction. This line crosses the Neponset River on the Canton Viaduct, a prominent local landmark. Route 128 Station in neighboring Westwood also carries many Canton commuters into Boston. Amtrak trains (including the Acela Express high-speed trains) also stop at Route 128, but pass through Canton without stopping. Of note, on March 25, 2008, a runaway box car crashed into a MBTA train at Canton Junction station injuring 150 people on board.

Another line branches into Stoughton, stopping at Canton Center.

Bus service is available to Mattapan Station in the MBTA system.

Canton once had an airfield, but it closed down in 1970. Norwood Memorial Airport is the closest airport to Canton. For scheduled air service, residents go to Boston's Logan International Airport or to T. F. Green Airport in Rhode Island.

== Points of interest ==
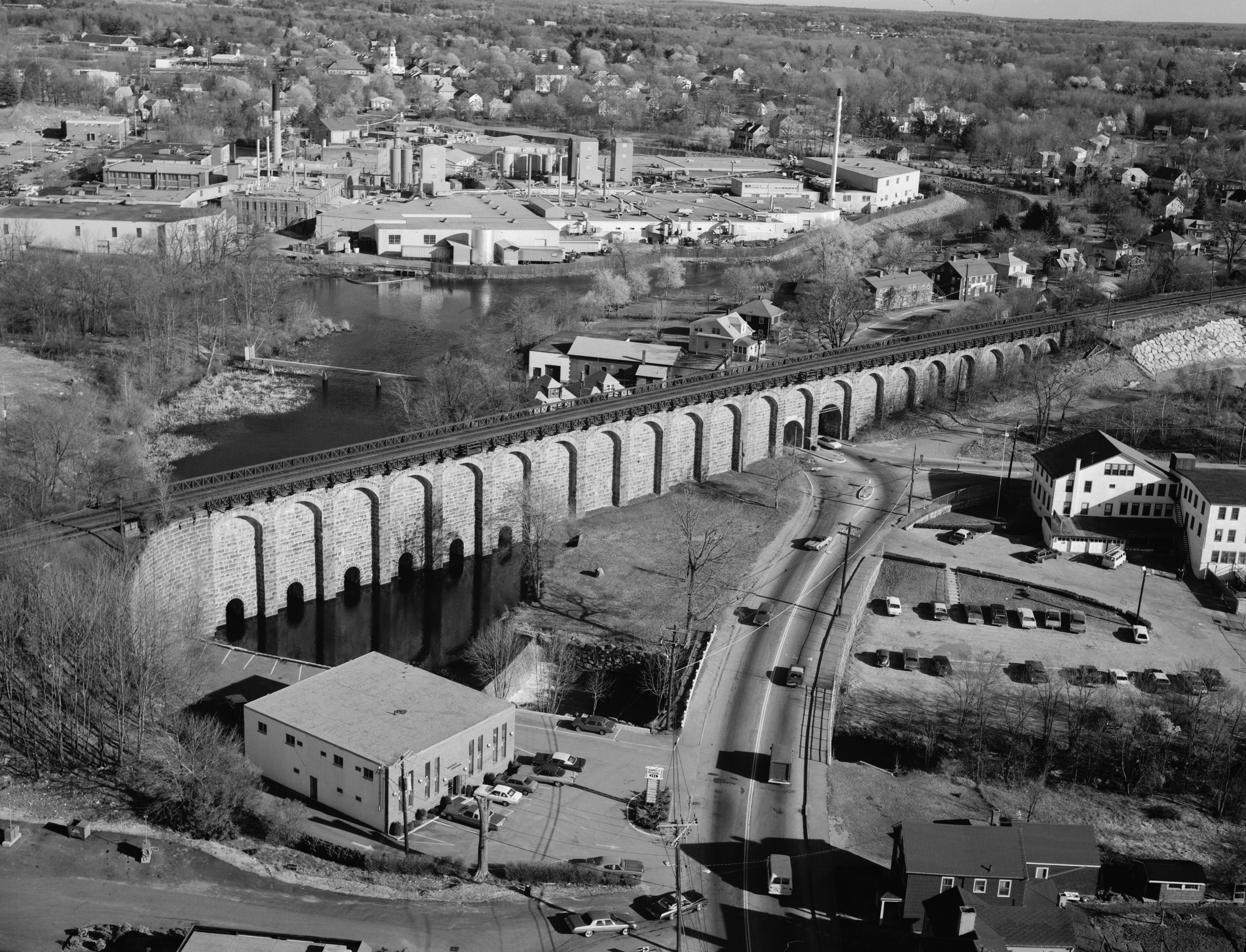
A west side view of the Canton Viaduct looking south with the former Revere Copper Mill in the background, April 1977.

- The Canton Viaduct, built in 1835, is one of the two oldest surviving multiple arch stone railroad bridges still in active mainline use in the US. Tsar Nicholas I of Russia sent workmen to draw extensive diagrams of it in order to duplicate its design for the construction of two bridges on the Moscow–Saint Petersburg Railway.
- Canton Corner Historic District
- The David Tilden House, a nearly 300-year-old house within the Canton Corner Historic District. Undergoing a major preservation effort. One of the oldest houses in America.
- The Massachusetts Audubon Society's Museum of American Bird Art, where the Mildred Morse Allen Wildlife Sanctuary is located, houses extensive collections of natural history art and photography. Public programs integrating art and nature, and changing exhibitions in the gallery, provide opportunities for visitors to view featured works from the collections.
- The Eleanor Cabot Bradley Estate, a nonprofit museum, is a country house designed by Charles A. Platt with garden grounds at 2468B Washington Street (Route 138). In 1902 Arthur Tracy Cabot hired Platt to design a country house with landscaping and outlying farm buildings, with formal grounds include lawns, a walled garden, and a parterre. In 1945, Cabot's niece, Eleanor Cabot Bradley, added ponds, a camellia house and greenhouse, and planted specimen trees. The land includes more than 60 acres (24 ha; 240,000 m^{2}) of meadows and woods, with some 3 miles (4.8 km) of walking trails.
- Acambis, one of the few smallpox vaccine producers contracted by the United States Government, makes its vaccine at the Shawmut Industrial Park in Canton. In the many months after the September 11, 2001 attacks, Army National Guard units were stationed around the factory and now the Canton Police has a regular patrol of the park.
- The nonprofit Friends of Prowse Farm, in collaboration with the present property owner, Meditech, Inc., preserve the historical Prowse Farm property and make the 44 acres (18 ha) and mansion available for indoor and/or outdoor events including party and wedding rentals, corporate functions, recreational and educational programs and fund-raising events. The Friends of Prowse Farm are a true non-profit volunteer organization, celebrating their 35th year in 2010—without any salaries taken by its officers or staff. Fund-raising events hosted by various charitable organizations at the farm have raised an estimated $20 million.
- The Paul Revere Heritage Site, a nine-acre (3.6 ha) public site dedicated to protecting, preserving, and interpreting the work of Paul Revere as an American pioneer in the invention of the copper industry.

== Notable people ==
- Emily Morison Beck, editor known for Bartlett's Familiar Quotations
- Bill Burr, actor/comedian
- Commodore John Downes, U.S. Navy officer who fought in the War with Tripoli and the War of 1812 and commanded a punitive expedition to Sumatra in the 1830s
- Paul Guilfoyle, actor, CSI: Crime Scene Investigation
- Joseph Henry Hatfield, painter
- Augustus Hemenway, philanthropist, public servant
- Harriett Lawrence Hemenway, co-founder of Massachusetts Audubon Society
- William Augustus Hinton, American physician and pioneering bacteriologist
- Chuck Hogan, novelist
- Maurice Hurst Jr., defensive tackle for the Oakland Raiders
- Rob Mariano, a.k.a. "Boston Rob", reality TV personality (five-time Survivor and two-time The Amazing Race participant)
- John O'Keefe, resident of Canton, Boston police officer
- Paul Revere, Revolutionary War figure
- Kevin Rooney, professional ice hockey player
- Steve Rooney, professional ice hockey player
- Stephen Schnetzer, actor
- James B. Sumner, co-recipient of 1946 Nobel Prize in Chemistry
- Bobby Witt, a former baseball player for the Texas Rangers, father of baseball player Bobby Witt Jr.
- Donald Zilversmit (1919–2010), nutritional biochemist

== International relations ==
A German American Partnership high school exchange program has operated between Canton and Bocholt, Germany, since 1977.
