= Canton Corner Historic District =

Historic district in Massachusetts, United States

- U.S. National Register of Historic Places
- U.S. Historic district
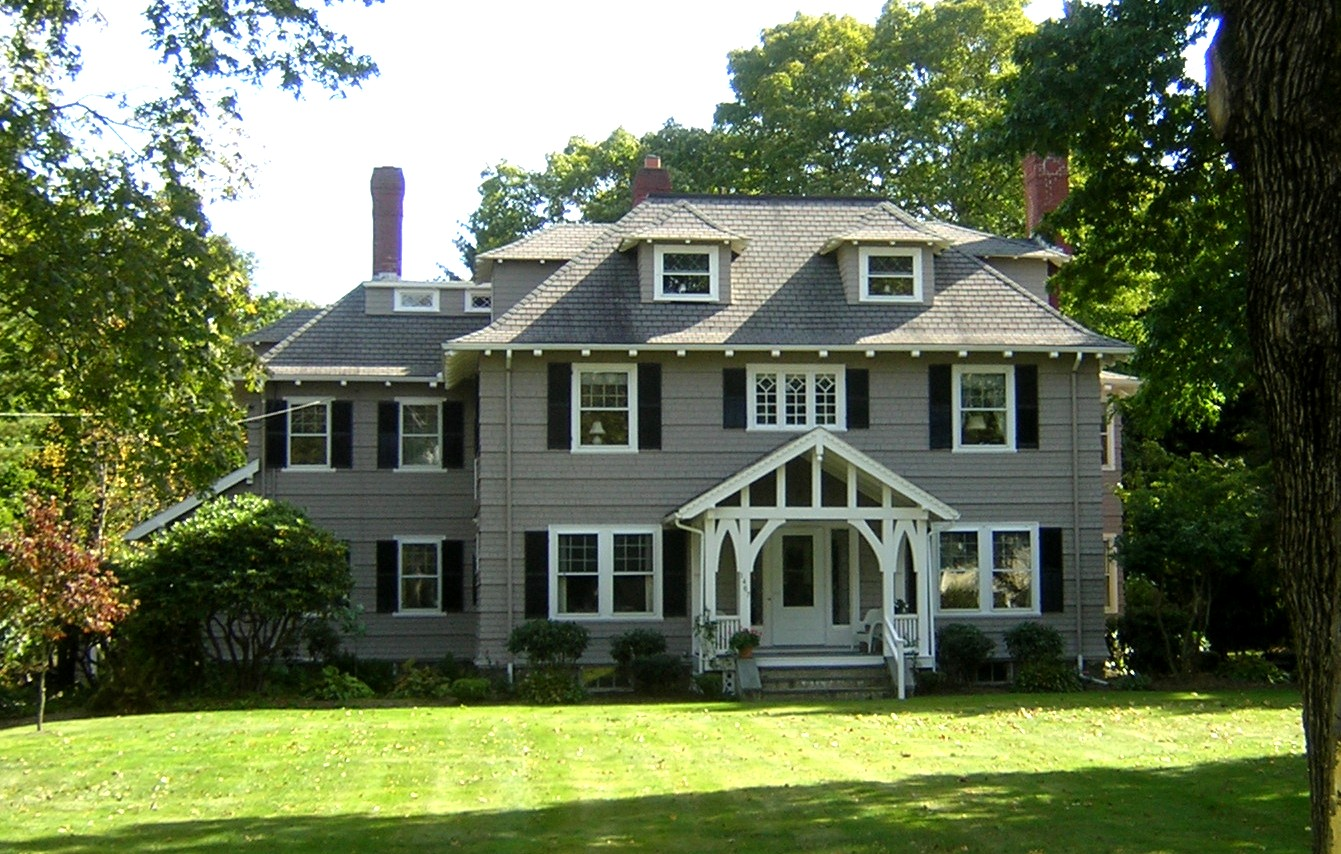
- House on Washington Street

- Location within Massachusetts
- Location: Roughly Washington St. from Pecunit St. to SW. of Dedham St., and Pleasant St. from Washington St. to Reservoir Rd., Canton, Massachusetts
- Coordinates: 42°10′26″N 71°8′10″W
- Area: 170 acres (69 ha)
- NRHP reference No.: 09000697
- Added to NRHP: September 9, 2009

The Canton Corner Historic District is a historic district encompassing the historic town center of Canton, Massachusetts. Centered on the junction of Pleasant and Washington Streets, it includes more than 25 properties and 170 acres (69 ha), whose architectural history spans 250 years of occupation and include the town's major civic buildings. The district was added to the National Register of Historic Places on September 9, 2009.

== Description and history ==
The town of Canton, located south of Boston, Massachusetts, was first settled in the 17th century by English colonial settlers involved in the Ponkapoag native "praying town", but its center of development moved to the southwest in the 18th century due to the higher quality of farmland there. Washington Street, the main east–west road through the district, was laid out in 1700 and Pleasant Street in 1723, running south from Washington Street across a dam that impounded Pequid Brook, the southern extent of the district, to form Reservoir Pond. The town's first colonial meetinghouse was built at Canton Corner in 1707, and its town hall was built there in 1824.

The district extends from east to west along Washington Street, from Dedham Street to the Canton Corner Cemetery, and south along Pleasant Street to Pequid Brook. The district includes housing spanning more than 250 years of architectural styles, from Georgian (e.g. the c. 1725 David Tilden House at 93 Pleasant Street) to the Craftsman/Bungalow style (e.g. the 1905 Bessie Estey House at 1452 Washington Street). Its oldest public building is the 1824 First Congregational Parish Church, built in 1824; it is a late Federal period building with both Greek and Gothic Revival features. A particularly fine example of Italianate architecture is the John Williams House at 18 Dedham Street.

== Gallery ==
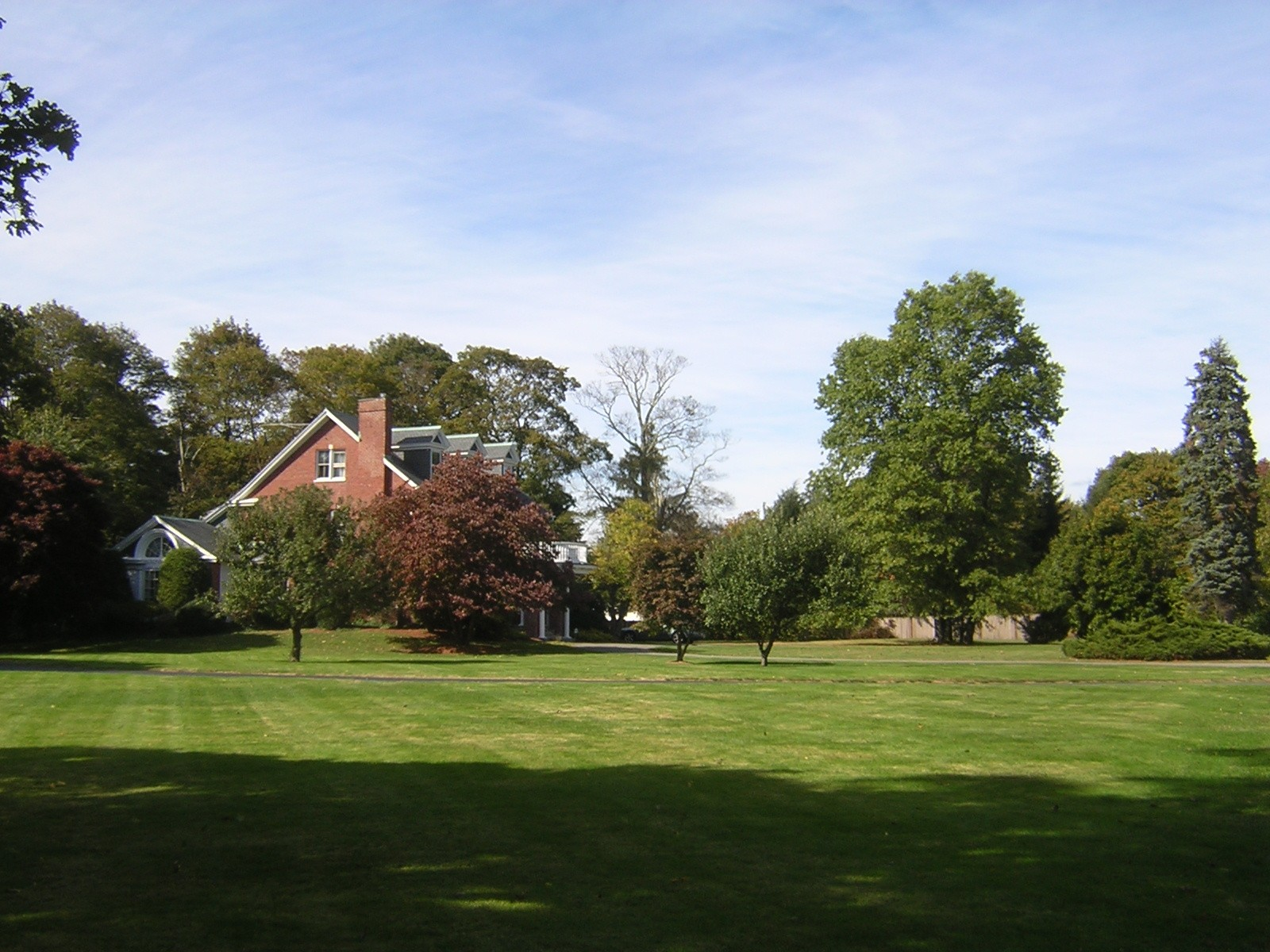
House on Pleasant Street

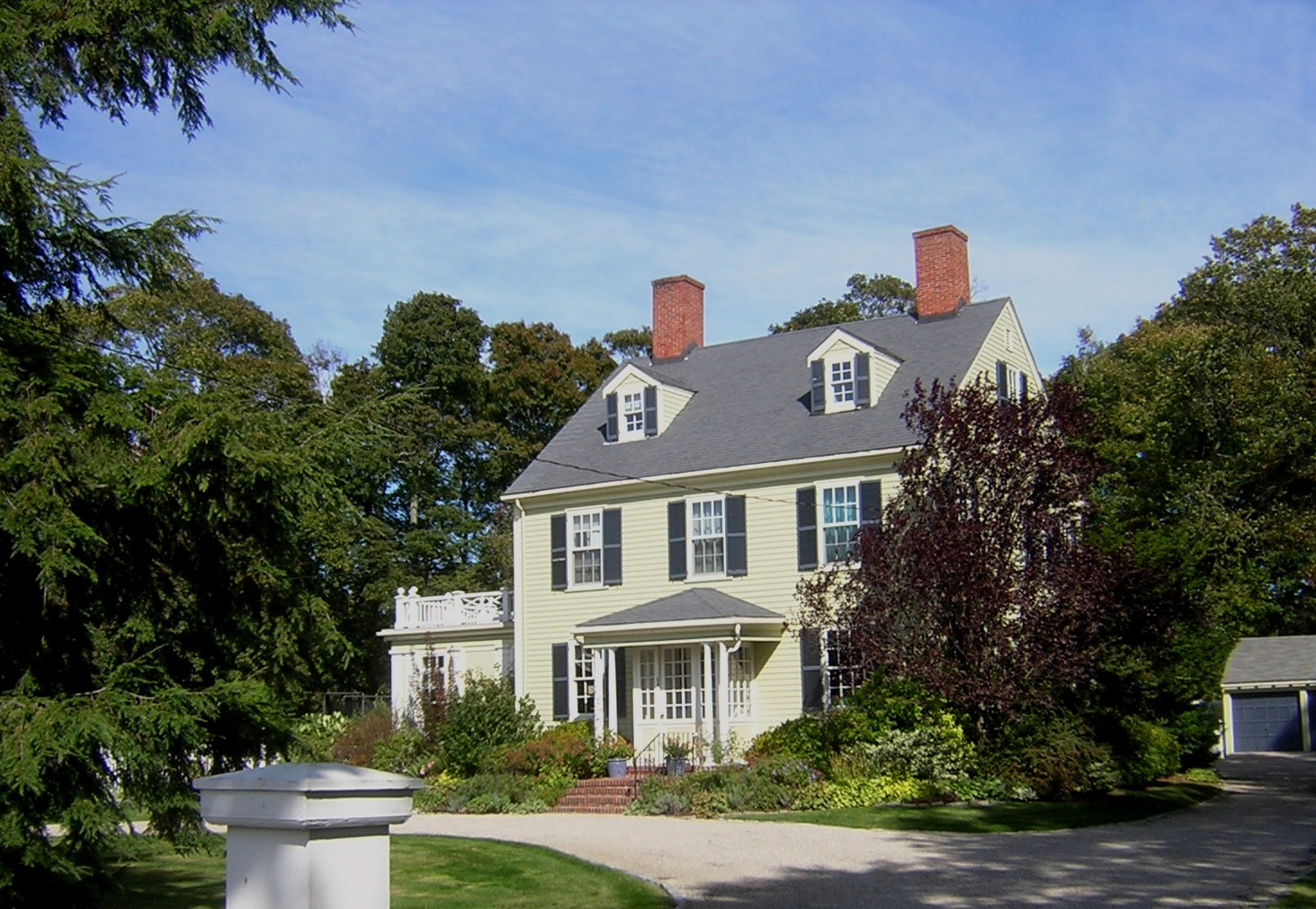
House on Pleasant Street

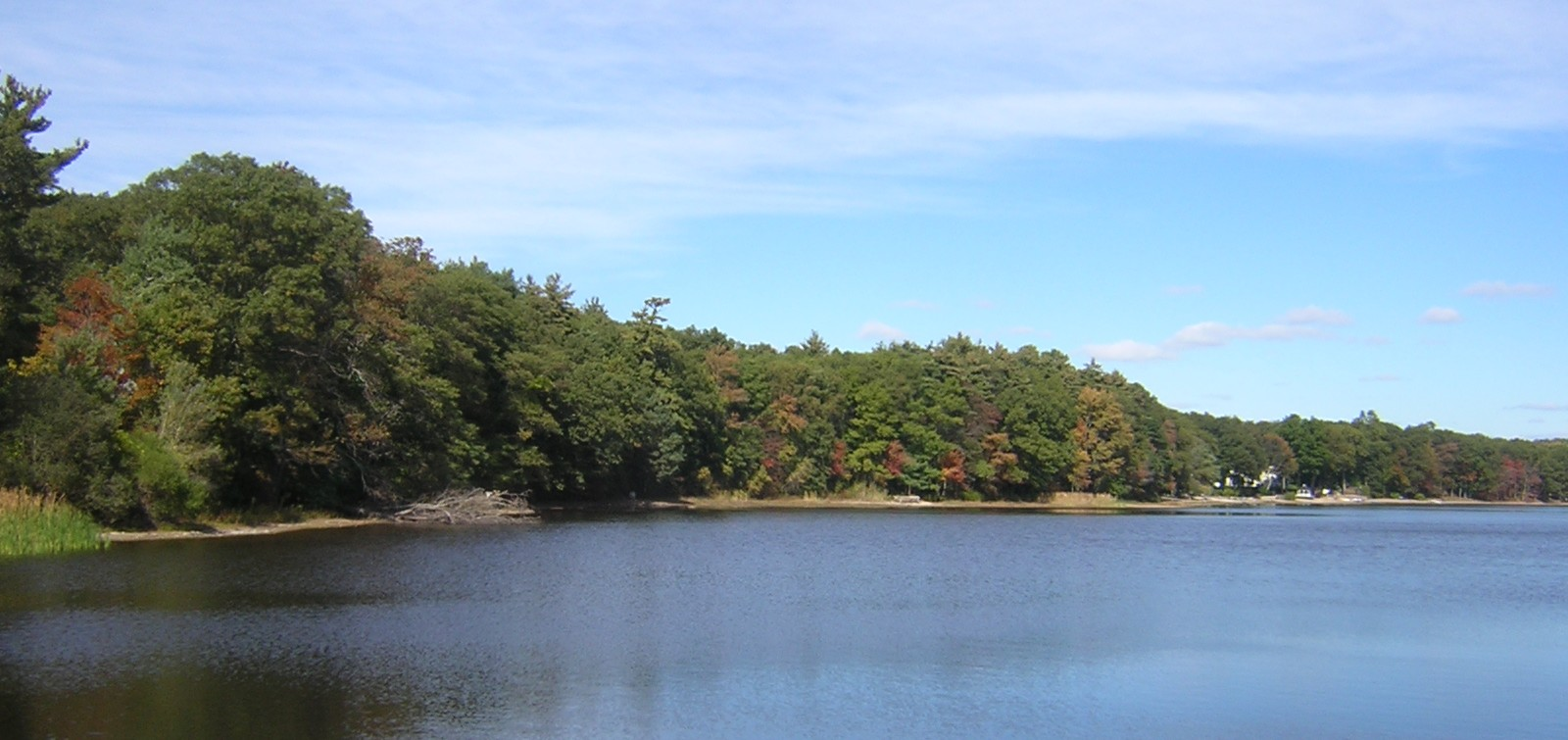
Reservoir Pond

== See also ==
- National Register of Historic Places listings in Norfolk County, Massachusetts
