= Praying Indians of Natick and Ponkapoag =

Organization in Massachusetts, United States

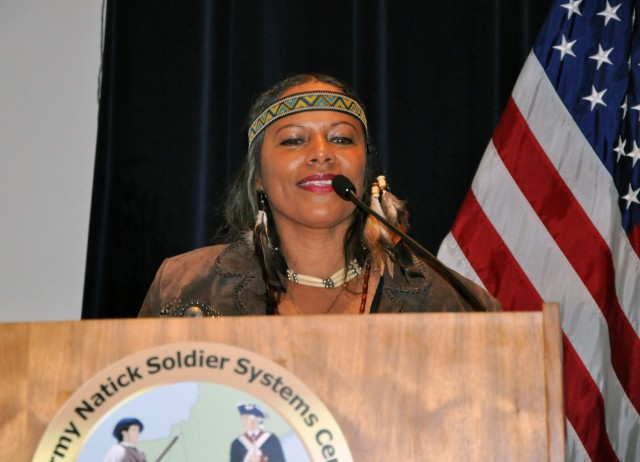
- Rosita Andrews, Chief Caring Hands, 2011
- Named after: Natick, Massachusetts, Ponkapoag praying town
- Formation: 1996; 30 years ago
- Founded at: Stoughton, Massachusetts
- Type: Nonprofit
- Registration no.: 000551105
- Legal status: nonprofit
- Purpose: Cultural, Ethnic Awareness
- Location: Stoughton, Massachusetts, United States
- Members: 60 (2021)
- President: Rosita Andrews
- Website: natickprayingindians.org

The Praying Indians of Natick and Ponkapoag is a cultural heritage group that claims descendancy from Praying Indians in Massachusetts, including the Massachusett people, an Indigenous people of the Northeastern Woodlands.

While they identify as a Native American tribe, they are unrecognized, meaning they are neither a federally recognized tribe nor a state-recognized tribe.

== Nonprofit organizations ==
The Praying Indians of Natick and Ponkapoag is a 501(c)(3) nonprofit organization established under the name "Praying Indians of Natick Mother Village Ut Ponkapog Kah Peantamoonk Otanash Yeshuatribal Council, Inc." in 1996. They are based in Stoughton, Massachusetts.

== Officers ==
The officers of the Praying Indians of Natick and Ponkapoag are as follows:

- Rosita Andrews, president
- Rosita Andrews, treasurer
- Amber Orlando, clerk
- Rosita Andrews, assistant clerk.

Shawn V. Silva, also known as StrongMedicine Bear, served as director from 1996 to 2019. Silva is Andrews' son.

== Activities ==
Rosita Andrews is a public speaker, who goes by the name Chief Caring Hands. She spoke to the Natick School Committee to retire their Native American mascot. Andrews also officiated the wedding of her son StrongMedicine Bear and WarriorWoman at the historic Eliot Church in Natick, Massachusetts, in 2015.

The Boston Equal Rights League invites representatives of the organization its annual Faneuil Hall commemoration of the Boston Massacre.

The organization hosts an annual powwow at Cochituate State Park.

== See also ==
- Massachusett Tribe at Ponkapoag
- List of organizations that self-identify as Native American tribes
