= Joseph Henry Hatfield =

American retailer and painter (1863–1928)

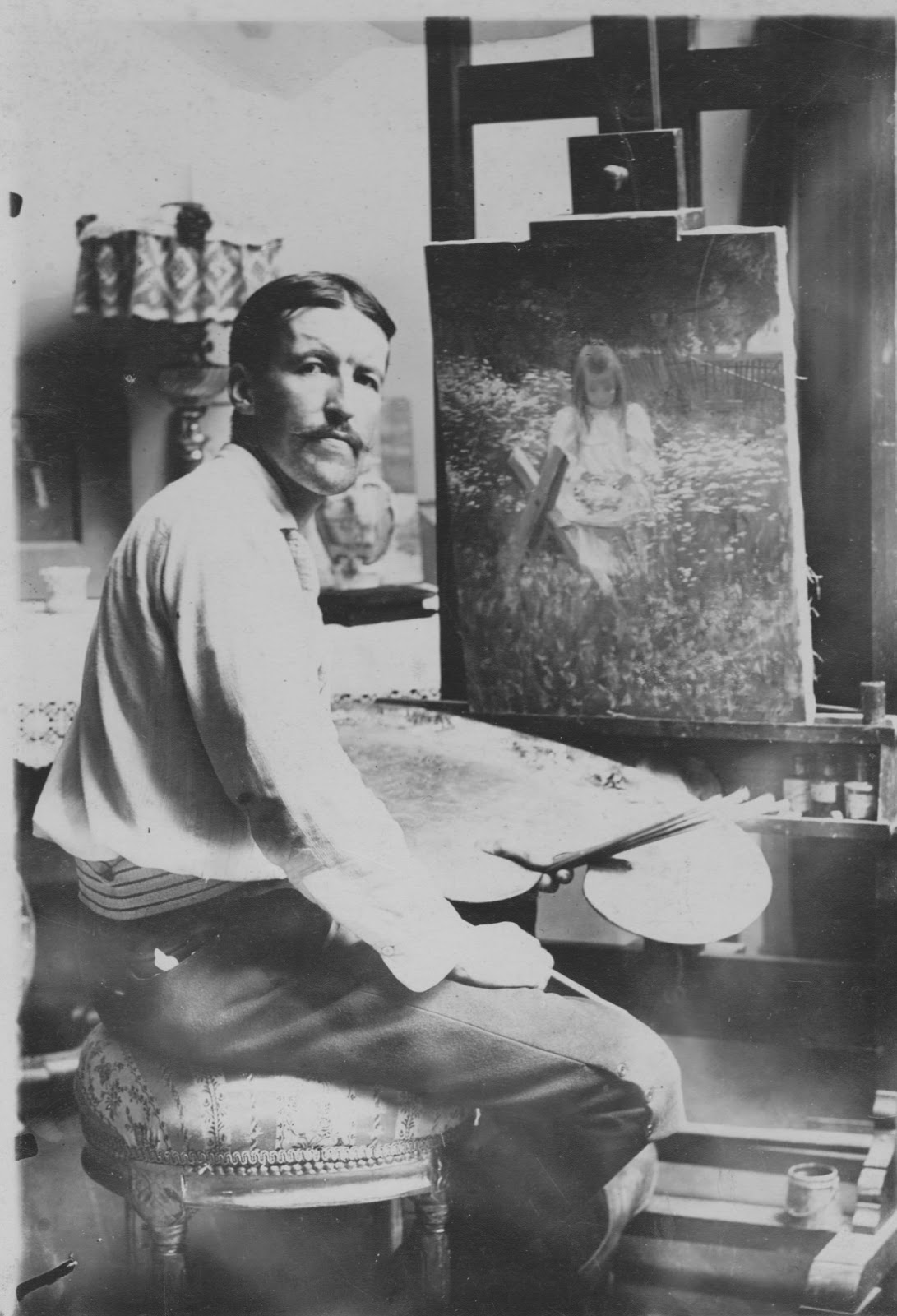
- Hatfield in his studio, c.1895
- Born: June 1863; Kingston, Canada West
- Died: January 12, 1928 (aged 64); Canton Junction, Massachusetts, U.S.
- Occupations: Businessman, painter
- Style: Impressionism

Joseph Henry Hatfield (June 1863 – January 12, 1928) was an American painter and manufacturer of artist's oil paints. His work was shown in national and international exhibitions.

== Early life and education ==
Hatfield was born near Kingston, Canada West, to William and Mary Jane (née Blick) Hatfield. Both parents and an older brother were born in England. William Hatfield was a silk weaver. In 1862, the family emigrated from England to Canada, then moved to Boston in 1866.

Hatfield became interested in art at an early age. The 1880 U.S. census listed the sixteen-year-old's occupation as "artist". In 1889–1890, he studied in Paris at the Académie Julian with Jean-Joseph Benjamin-Constant, Henri Lucien Doucet, and Jules Joseph Lefebvre.

== Career ==
Hatdield participated in the Paris Salon in 1891.

He settled in Canton, Massachusetts, and also maintained a Boston studio in the Harcourt Studios building, which burned down in 1904. Trained in figure painting, Hatfield specialized in genre painting, particularly scenes of children at play. Later in his career, he concentrated on landscapes.

Hatfield also supplied illustrations for periodicals. His drawings for "The Yellow Wall-paper", a short story by Charlotte Perkins Stetson, were published by The New England Magazine in January 1892.

=== Manufacturing and retailing ===
Noticing that many artists' oil paints in general use darkened over time, Hatfield decided to make his own. Starting in his basement with pigments imported from Europe, he developed a line of paints he called Hatfield's Hand Ground Artists Oil Paints. When the business outgrew the basement, Hatfield built a small factory behind his house in Canton Junction.

In 1898, he opened a retail store, Hatfield's Color Shop, in the basement of the Hotel Ludlow in Copley Square. Hatfield sold his paints along with other artists' materials, and hosted exhibitions of the works of other artists. After his death in 1928, the shop was run by his elder daughter, Doris. The business had branches in the Massachusetts towns of Cambridge, Rockport, and East Gloucester.

== Personal life ==
In 1885, Hatfield married Flora E. Barber in Vermont. They had two daughters, Doris (1888–1977) and Pauline (1899–1950), who often served as models for their father. The 1900 U. S. census lists Hatfield as a naturalized citizen.

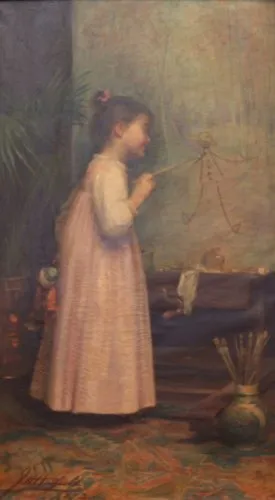
Helping Papa, 1894

== Exhibitions and awards ==
- Boston Art Club, 1888–1902
  An exhibition in 1894 included one hundred and forty works by Hatfield.
- Paris Salon, 1891, Letter from Papa
- Massachusetts Charitable Mechanic Association, 1892, Letter from Papa and The Doll's Bath
- Massachusetts Charitable Mechanic Association, 1893, silver medal
- World's Columbian Exposition, Chicago, 1893, Letter from Papa, The Doll's Bath
- Art Institute of Chicago, 1894
  Helping Papa, perhaps Hatfield's best-known work, depicts his daughter adding a stick figure to a landscape painting.
- Pennsylvania Academy of Fine Arts, 1896, Among the Flowers
- Second Hallgarten prize ($200), National Academy of Design, 1896, After the Bath
- Louisiana Purchase Exposition, St. Louis, 1904

== Gallery ==
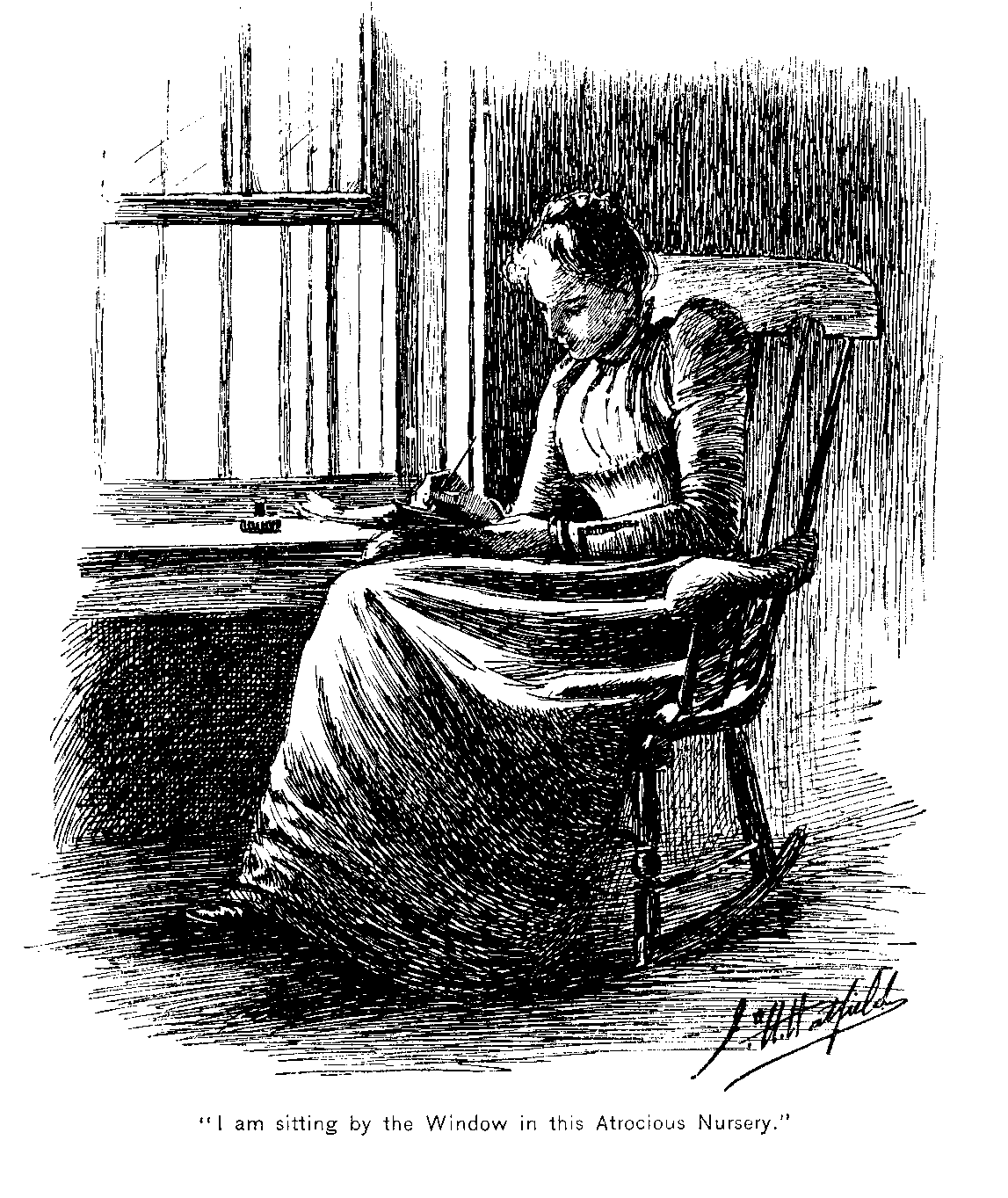
Illustration for The Yellow Wall-paper, 1892

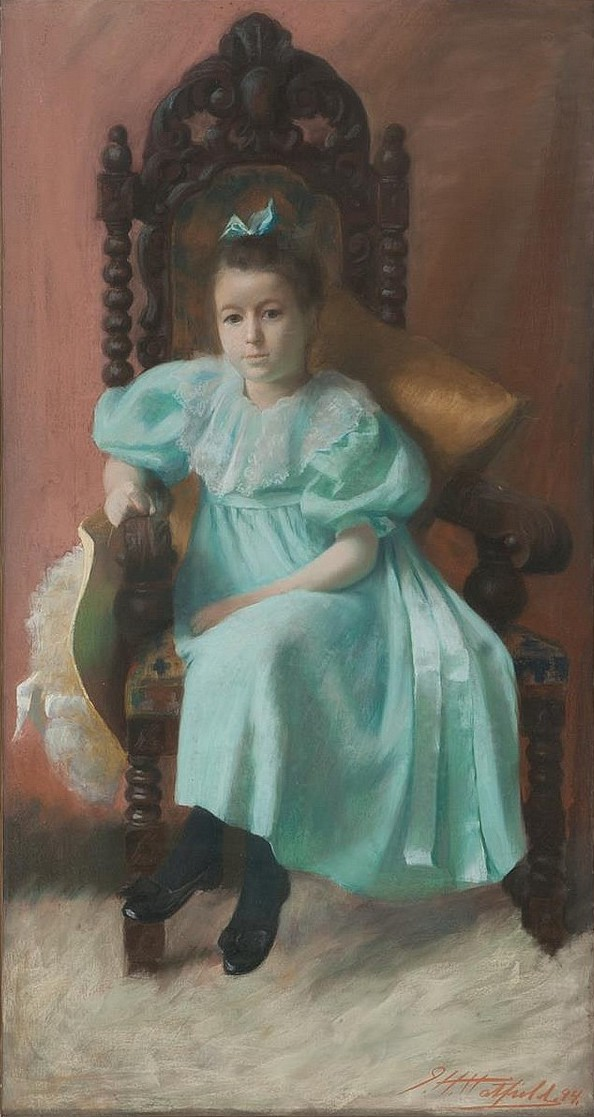
Young Girl in a Blue Dress, 1894

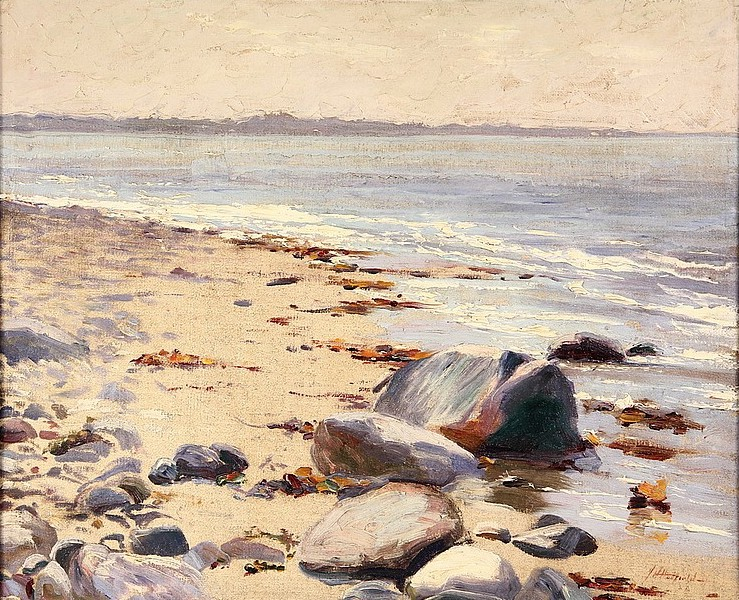
Along the Shore

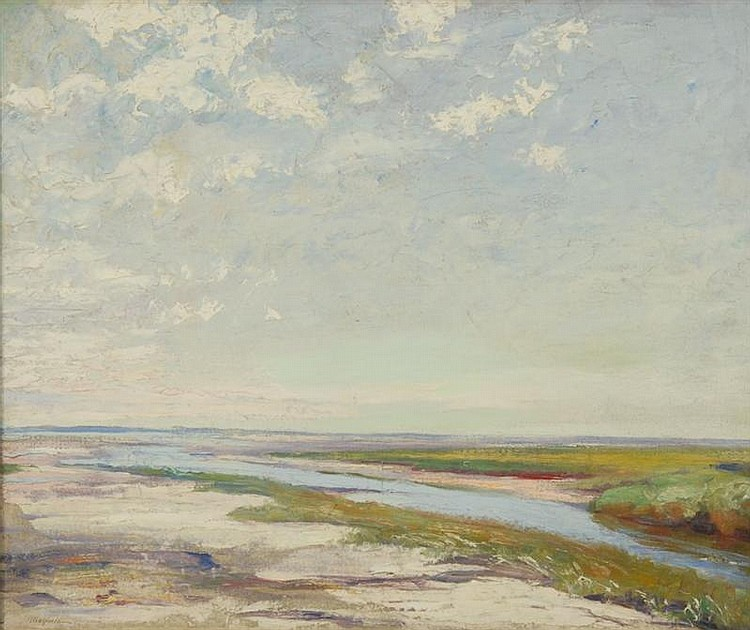
Cape Cod

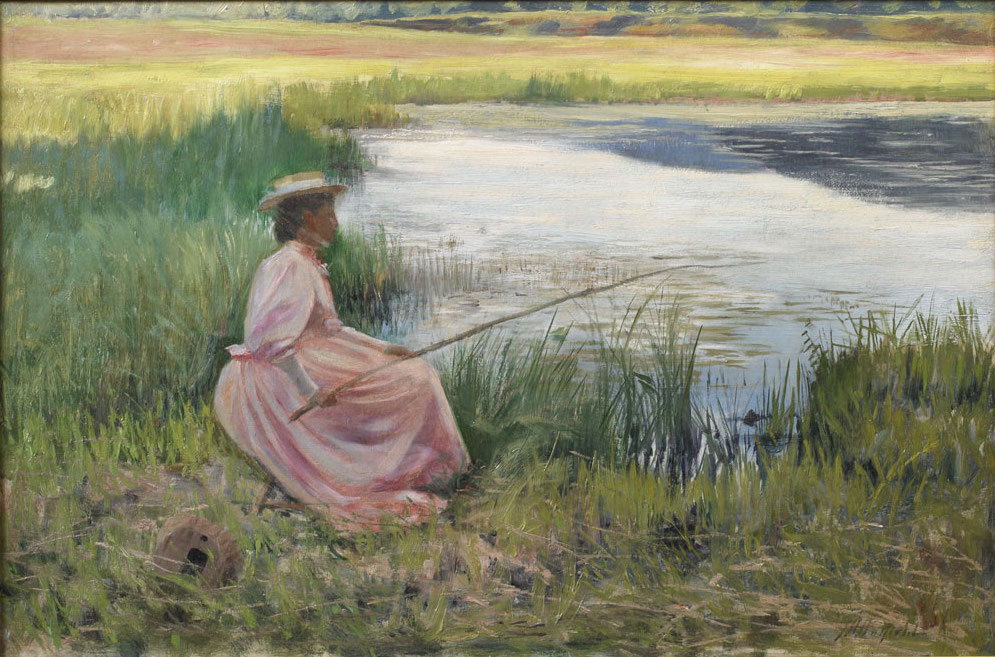
Young Woman Fishing Along a River

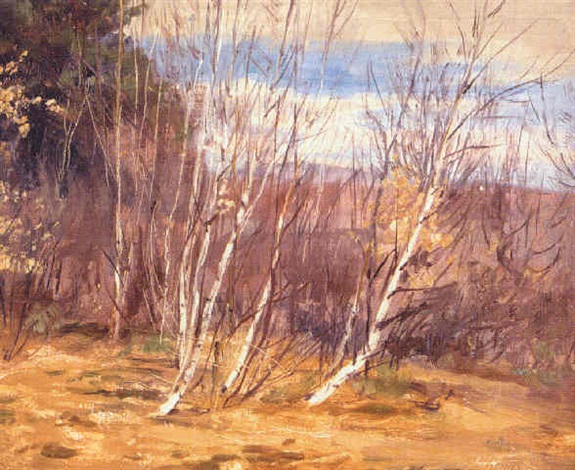
Blue Hill from Wetherbee, 1909

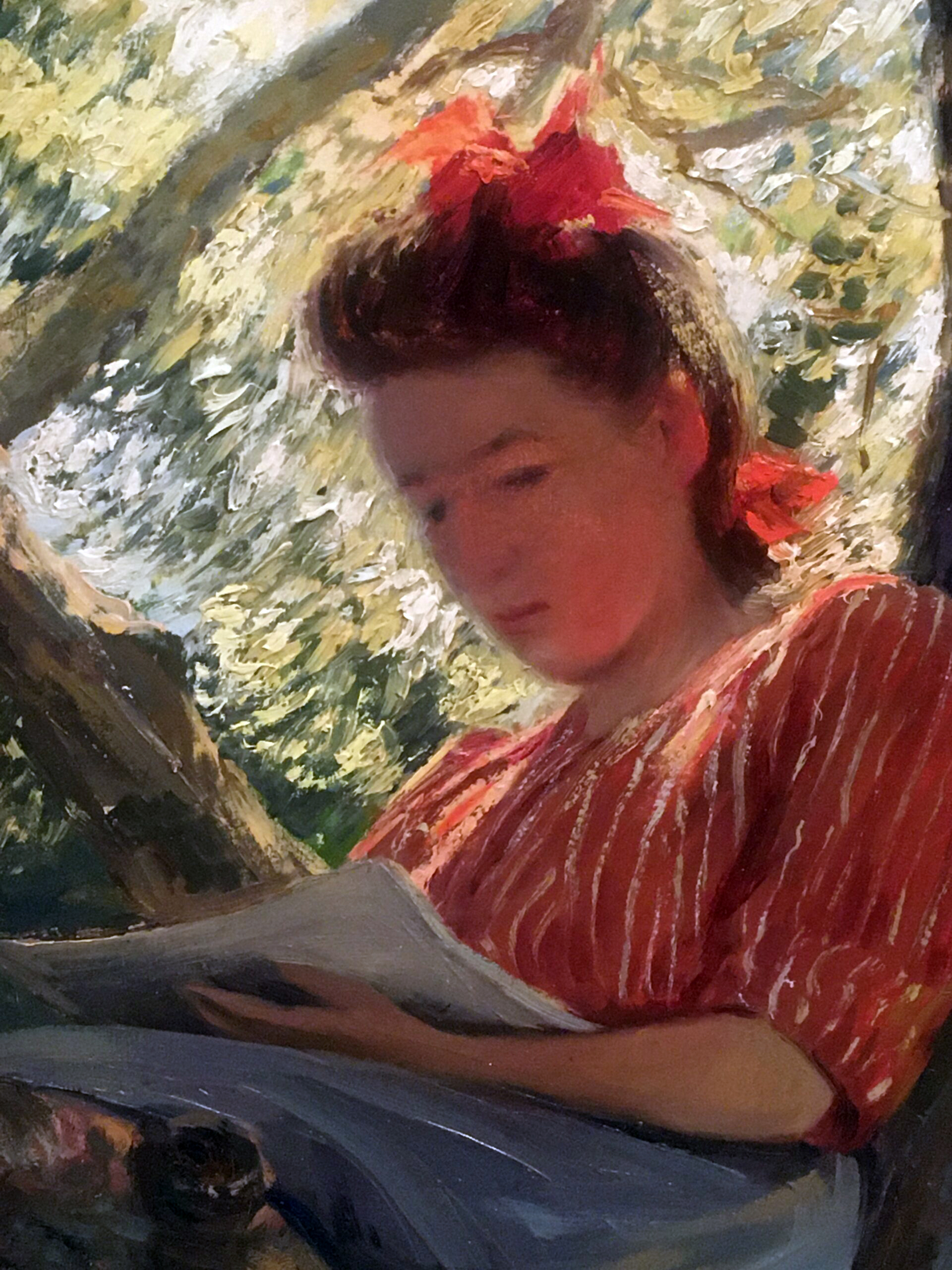
Reading in a Tree (detail), c. 1910

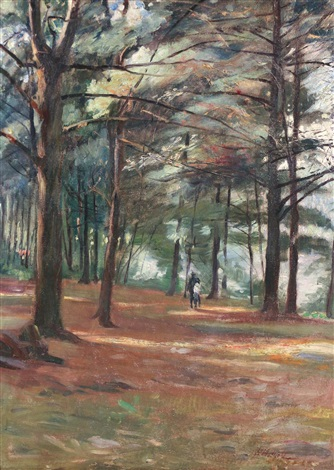
Forest Interior with Figures

== Sources ==
- Baschet, Ludovic, ed. (1891). Catalogue illustré de Peinture et Sculpture: Salon de 1891. Paris: Librairie d'Art.
