= Canton River (United States) =

River in Massachusetts, United States

Coordinates: 42.1576°N 71.1631°W

A map of the Canton River

The Canton River is a river passing through Canton, Massachusetts. It flows into the Neponset River, connecting Bolivar Pond and Forge Pond.

It traces down Washington and Neponset Streets (flowing under the Canton Viaduct), and continues down Walpole Street. It is a tributary of the Neponset River, with a few tributaries on the side. It is also called the East Branch of the Neponset River. The viaduct, built in 1835, became part of the path for the Boston and Providence Railroad.

The Canton River was home to several gunpowder mills and gristmills as early as 1703, as the area that would become Canton was first settled.

In 2011, a public fish consumption advisory was issued for the river due to on high levels of polychlorinated biphenyls and DDT.
