= Massachusett Tribe at Ponkapoag =

Cultural heritage group in the U.S.

Massachusett Tribe at Ponkapoag Massachuset-Ponkapoag Tribal Council, Inc. Ponkapoag Land Corporation
- Named after: Massachusett people, Ponkapoag praying town
- Formation: 2002
- Founder: Gilbert Solomon
- Founded at: Holliston, Massachusetts
- Type: Nonprofit
- Registration no.: Massachuset-Ponkapoag Tribal Council, Inc.: EIN 32-0020700, Ponkapoag Land Corporation: EIN 32-0020702
- Legal status: nonprofit
- Purpose: Cultural, Ethnic Awareness
- Location: Bridgewater, Massachusetts, United States
- President: Gilbert Solomon
- Revenue: $5.73K (2012)
- Expenses: $4.05K (2012)
- Website: massachusetttribe.org

The Massachusett Tribe at Ponkapoag is a cultural heritage group that claims descendancy from the Massachusett people, an Indigenous people of the Northeastern Woodlands.

While they identify as a Native American tribe, they are unrecognized, meaning they are neither a federally recognized tribe nor a state-recognized tribe.

== Nonprofit organizations ==
The Massachuset-Ponkapoag Tribal Council, Inc. is a 501(c)(3) nonprofit organization established in 2002; however, GuideStar reports that their nonprofit status was revoked for failing to file 990 tax forms with the IRS for three consecutive years. As a cultural awareness organization, their stated mission is "The Education of the Massachuset people in our history, customs and culture." Gilbert Solomon is the principal officer, based in Bridgewater, Massachusetts. Their agent is Massachusetts Registered Agent, LLC.

The Ponkapoag Land Corporation is an active nonprofit organization, also founded in 2002 with Gilbert Solomon serving as agent. Its registered address is in Holliston, Massachusetts.

== Officers ==
The officers of the Massachuset-Ponkapoag Tribal Council, Inc., and Ponkapoag Land Corporation are as follows:

- Gilbert Solomon, president
- Thomas Green, vice president
- Elizabeth Solomon, treasurer
- Alysha Gray, clerk.

Robin Harris became the director of the Massachusetts-Ponkapoag Tribal Council, Inc. in 2021. Jean Oliver Foster became director of the Ponkapoag Land Corporation in 2021.

Elizabeth Solomon, a member and officer of the Massachusett Tribe at Ponkapoag and a Harvard University alumna and director of administration at the Harvard School of Public Health, has delivered land acknowledgments for the university and other area institutions.

== Activities ==
As the Massachusett Tribe at Ponkapoag, the organization released an open letter in 2020 opposing the use of Native American sports mascots. Members participated in the Wessagussett Wetlands and Woodlands site's unveiling of public signage of local history in Weymouth, Massachusetts. The Massachusett Tribe at Ponkapoag has publicly called on Boston University to rename its Myles Standish Hall to Wituwamat Memorial Hall after a Neponset tribal member killed by colonists in 1623.

The National Park Service listed the Massachusett Tribe at Ponkapoag the organization among the Indigenous groups connected with the Boston Harbor Islands and states that Massachusett people continue to live in and care for the region. Members of the organization have participated in public cultural projects, including a joint Massachusett-Nipmuc construction of a traditional mishoon in Boston in 2022.

== See also ==
- Praying Indians of Natick and Ponkapoag
- List of organizations that self-identify as Native American tribes
