= Ponkapoag =

17th-century Christian Native American settlement in Massachusetts

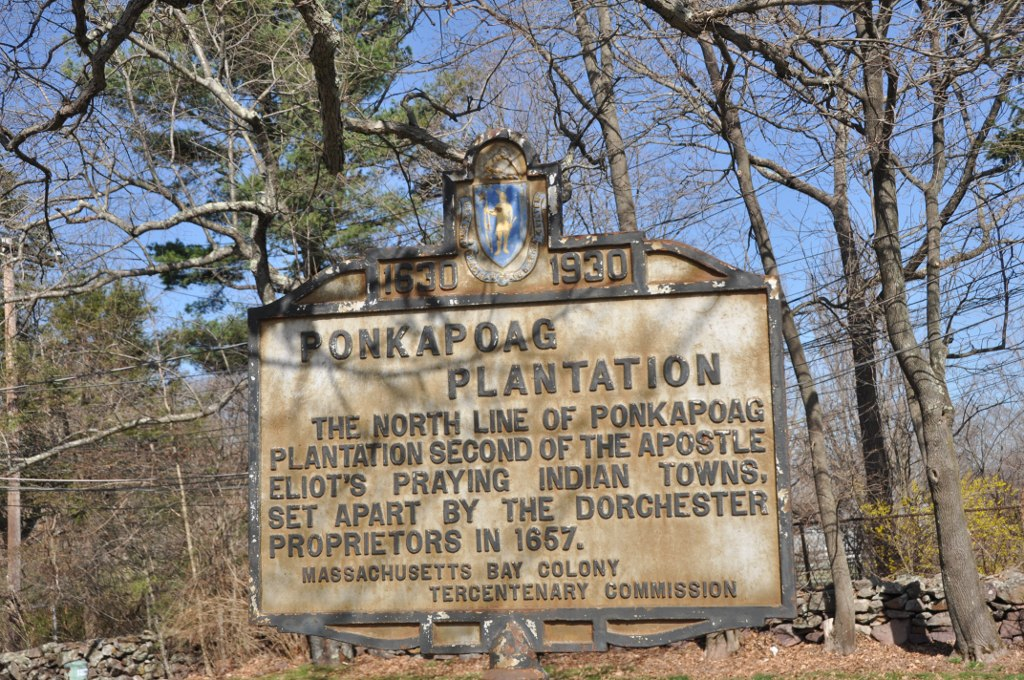
Historic marker on Massachusetts Route 138 indicating the northern boundary of the Ponkapoag Plantation or settlement

Ponkapoag /ˈpɒŋkəpɔːɡ/, also Punkapaug, Punkapoag, Ponkhapoag or Punkapog, is the name of a Native American "praying town" settled in the late 17th century western Blue Hills area of eastern Massachusetts by persons who had accepted Christianity. It was established in 1657, during the colonization of the Atlantic seaboard of the United States by settlers from Britain. This was the name given to the winter residence (and subsequently to the tribe) of the group of Massachusett who lived at the mouth of the Neponset River near Dorchester in the summer, in what colonists called Neponset Mill.

Ponkapoag is now contained almost entirely by the town of Canton, Massachusetts. The name is derived from a nearby pond 1 mile (1.6 km) south of Great Blue Hill; Ponkapoag means "shallow pond" or "a spring that bubbles from red soil".

== History ==
Ponkapoag Plantation was established in 1657 as a 6,000-acre (2,400 ha) town parcel formed from Dorchester, Massachusetts Bay Colony. It was the second Christianized native settlement, or "Praying Town" in Massachusetts, after Natick was established in 1651.

In 1654 members of the Nemasket Tribe, located in the village of Cohannet in current day Bristol County, were among the first Native Americans relocated to Ponkapoag by missionaries. From 1657 to his death around 1670, Quashaamit (William) served as a teaching minister in Ponkapoag, and also deeded large parcels of land in modern day Mendon, Milford, Braintree (Quincy), and North Smithfield.

== Legacy ==
The Improved Order of Red Men, a European-American fraternal order, had a "Ponkapaug tribe" active in West Roxbury, Boston, Massachusetts, into the early 20th century.

Several unrecognized tribes claim descent from the Ponkaoag, including the Praying Indians of Natick and Ponkapoag in Stoughton, the Massachusett Tribe at Ponkapoag in Bridgewater and Holliston, and the Ponkapoag Tribal Council in Brockton.

== See also ==
- Praying Indians
