= Pawtucket tribe =

Historic Native American tribe in MA and NH, USA

Pawtucket
Total population
- extinct as a tribe

Regions with significant populations
- northeastern Massachusetts, southern New Hampshire

Languages
- Eastern Algonquian

Religion
- Indigenous religion

Related ethnic groups
- Naumkeag people, Pennacook

The Pawtucket tribe were a confederation of Eastern Algonquian-speaking Native Americans in present-day northeastern Massachusetts and southeastern New Hampshire. They are mostly known in the historical record for their dealings with the early English colonists in the 17th century. Confusion exists about the proper endonym for this group who are variously referred to in European documents as Pawtucket, Pentucket, Naumkeag, Wamesit, or Mystic Indians, or by the name of their current sachem or sagamore.

== Territory ==
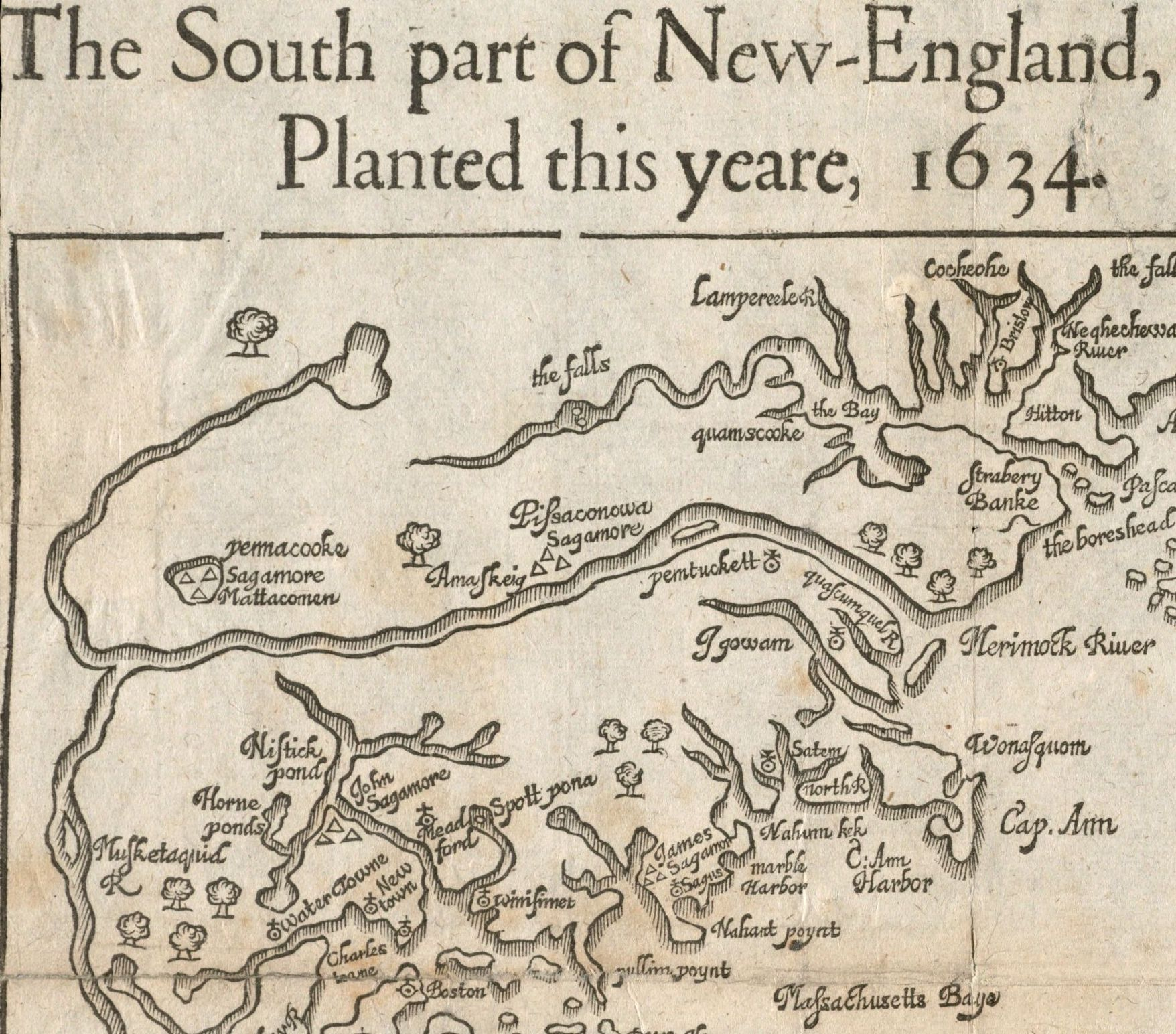
William Wood's 1634 map showing locations of Pawtucket Sagamores James and John

Pawtucket, meaning "at the falls," was a location in the Merrimack Valley of northeastern Massachusetts and southeastern New Hampshire, at the Pawtucket Falls in what is now Lowell, Massachusetts. In the early 1600s, the Pawtucket sachem held authority over the Pennacook (present-day Concord, New Hampshire), Agawam (present-day Cape Ann, Massachusetts), Naumkeag (present-day Salem, Massachusetts), Pascataway, and Accomintas peoples according to late contemporary source Daniel Gookin, but this authority waned after an epidemic in 1612-1613.

== History ==
At the time of contact with Europeans, Nanepashemet was a sachem of the group, who held prestige and influence with a wide range of native settlements from the present-day Charles River north to the Piscataqua River and west to the present-day Concord River. He was killed in 1617 in present day Medford, Massachusetts, in conflict with the Tarrantines, an Eastern Algonquian exonym for Miꞌkmaq, where his burial place was found by Edward Winslow in a scouting party from Plymouth. After his death, leadership of the group passed to his wife, known only to history as the Squaw Sachem of Mystic, who administered the region jointly with their three sons Wonohaquaham or "Sagamore John," Montowampate or "Sagamore James," and Wenepoykin or "Sagamore George."

After Nanepashemet's death, Passaconaway was recorded as being a Pawtucket chief sachem, who also held authority with the Wamesit, Pascataqua, and Pennacook peoples.

In December 1633, a smallpox epidemic killed both Wonohaquaham and Montowampate along with a large portion of the tribe, leaving Wenepoykin and the Squaw Sachem as the leaders of a much smaller group. When the Squaw Sachem died in roughly 1650, Wenepoykin became sole sachem of territory extending from present-day Winthrop to Malden, North Reading, Lynn, or even Salem. However, his attempts to assert his claim to these lands through the settlers' legal system were largely ineffective. During the next two decades, the size of the group further declined as the British Long Parliament and the Massachusetts General Court worked to relocate Native Americans into praying towns such as Natick and Wamesit, drawing some converts from within Wenepoykin's family.

In 1675, Wenepoykin and some of the remaining Pawtucket joined Metacomet in King Philip's War, which was a stark turning point in the history of Native Americans in New England, and for the Pawtucket/Naumkeag in particular. Wenepoykin was taken captive the next year in 1676 and sold into slavery in Barbados. During this same time, over 1,000 nonbelligerent Praying Indians, some of them originally Pawtucket, were interned on Deer Island, but only 167 survived to return to praying towns.

After eight years of slavery in Barbados, Wenepoykin returned to Massachusetts through the intercession of John Eliot, where he joined some remaining family members in Natick but died later the same year, leaving his lands to a maternal kinsman, Quonopohit, alias James Rumney Marsh, though by this time most of the hereditary territory of the sachem was occupied by English settlers. Quonopohit and other kinsmen successfully pushed for payment for Pawtucket/Naumkeag lands in what is now northeastern Massachusetts in the 1670s and 1680s.

At this point, the history of the Pawtucket blends with the history of other native groups who joined together in the remaining praying towns of Wamesit and Natick, as well as others who may have gone north to join the nascent Wabanaki Confederacy, which had been more successful in the northern theater of King Philip's War, also known as the First Abenaki War, in pushing back European settlement along what is now the coast of Maine.

== See also ==
- Naumkeag people
- Pennacook
- Praying Indians of Natick
