= Pennacook =

Native American people from Northeastern US

Total population
- extinct as a tribe

Regions with significant populations
- southern Maine, northeastern Massachusetts, southern New Hampshire

Languages
- unattested Algonquian language

Religion
- Indigenous religion

The Pennacook, also known by the names Penacook and Pennacock, were Algonquian Indigenous people who lived in what is now Massachusetts, New Hampshire, and southern Maine. They were not a united tribe but a network of politically and culturally allied communities. Penacook was also the name of a specific Native village in what is now Concord, New Hampshire.

The Pennacook were related to but not a part of the original Wabanaki Confederacy, which includes the Miꞌkmaq, Maliseet, Passamaquoddy, and Penobscot peoples.

== Name ==
Pennacook is also written as Penacook and Pennacock. The name Pennacook roughly translates (based on Abenaki cognates) as "at the bottom of the hill."

== Territory ==
Historian David Stewart-Smith suggests that the Penacook were Central Abenaki people. Their southern neighbors were the Massachusett and Wampanoag.

Pennacook territory bordered the Connecticut River in the West, Lake Winnipesauke in the north, the Piscataqua to the east, and the villages of the closely allied Pawtucket confederation along the southern Merrimack River to the south. The Pennacook homeland was built around the upper Merrimack and the major towns at Amoskeag Falls (now Manchester) and Pennacook (now Concord), which served as major population hubs and later fallback centers for people across the region during the colonial period.

== Confederacy ==
The Pennacook were a loose and fluid confederacy of village communities.

Bands within the Pennacook confederacy included the:

- Accomminta, Maine (Note: Or Accomentas, Accominticus, Accomintycus, Accomynticus)
- Agawam, Massachusetts
- Amoskeag, New Hampshire
- Coosuc, New Hampshire, also Cowasack
- Nashua, Massachusetts, also Nashaway
- Naumkeag, Massachusetts
- Newchiawanoc
- Pennacook (proper)
- Pentucket, Massachusetts
- Piscataqua, New Hampshire, also Piscataway
- Ossipee, New Hampshire
- Souhegan, New Hampshire
- Squamscot, New Hampshire
- Wachuset, Massachusetts, also Wachusett
- Wamesit, Massachusetts, also Wambesit
- Weshacum, Massachusetts, also Washacum
- Winnecowet, New Hampshire
- Winnipesaukee, New Hampshire

The children of Pennacook Sachem Passaconaway intermarried with the children of Pawtucket Bashaba Nanepashemet in the 17th century. Because decisions to ally and become a part of such alliances were largely in the hands of the leaders of individual bands, the membership of these confederations and alliances fluctuated regularly.

== Subsistence ==
Pennacook people were semi-sedentary. Families and bands had permanent claims to territory, and their hierarchical political structure from locally representative sagamores to more regionally representative sachems was fundamentally democratic and designed to reduce conflict and provide social stability. Leaders and sachems like Passaconaway played important roles in organizing long-distance kin and trade networks with allied neighbors (his own children were all married to the children of allied political leaders). Before the major epidemics of the 16th and 17th century would kill 90% of the Pennacook population, the Merrimack Valley and its tributaries like the Souhegan, Piscataquog, and Suncook, would have been densely populated, the environment carefully maintained. David Stewart-Smith (1998:19) estimated that the Merrimack Valley had 8,000–25,000 people before the epidemics, with a median of around 16,500 for the central area around Pennacook.

The major and permanent Pennacook towns and villages were built along the major rivers, and many were on the east side of the Merrimack, ostensibly for protection from the west. Life revolved around the seasons, and spring would begin with women collecting maple sap to make maple sugar. Men would return to hunting grounds and burn their grounds to turn over nutrients in the soils for later cultivation. In late spring fish like salmon and shad entered rivers and creeks as they made their way up the Merrimack. Many Pennacook villages were built just above natural waterfalls that trapped fish and made it easier to catch them in the late spring. Fiddlehead season would be followed by others still known today, like blueberry and raspberry seasons.

During the summers, families dispersed to summer villages and hunting camps. Women did most of the work of building and maintaining homes as well as farming. Their main crops were varieties of maize/corn and squash, which they planted along rivers and in meadows. While they found it difficult to clear the massive old-growth trees, the Pennacook manipulated beavers to move their dams and ponds up and down creeks and brooks, clearing and opening up land for farms that were later used by Europeans as convenient sites for cultivation. The fall was an important hunting and nut harvesting season (targeting butternuts, hickory nuts, black walnuts, and beech nuts, and several southern, fire-resistant species were propagated farther north when possible). The presence of southern, fire-resistant species of nut trees like hickories and black walnuts in New Hampshire today is thanks to the Pennacook. The forests would generally be burned again in the late fall before families returned to the more permanent winter camps to wait out the long winter. The Pennacook and the peoples of the Merrimack River Valley were also long-distance traders, and their major towns of Pennacook and Amoskeag drew people from around the region in the late spring and summers.

== History ==
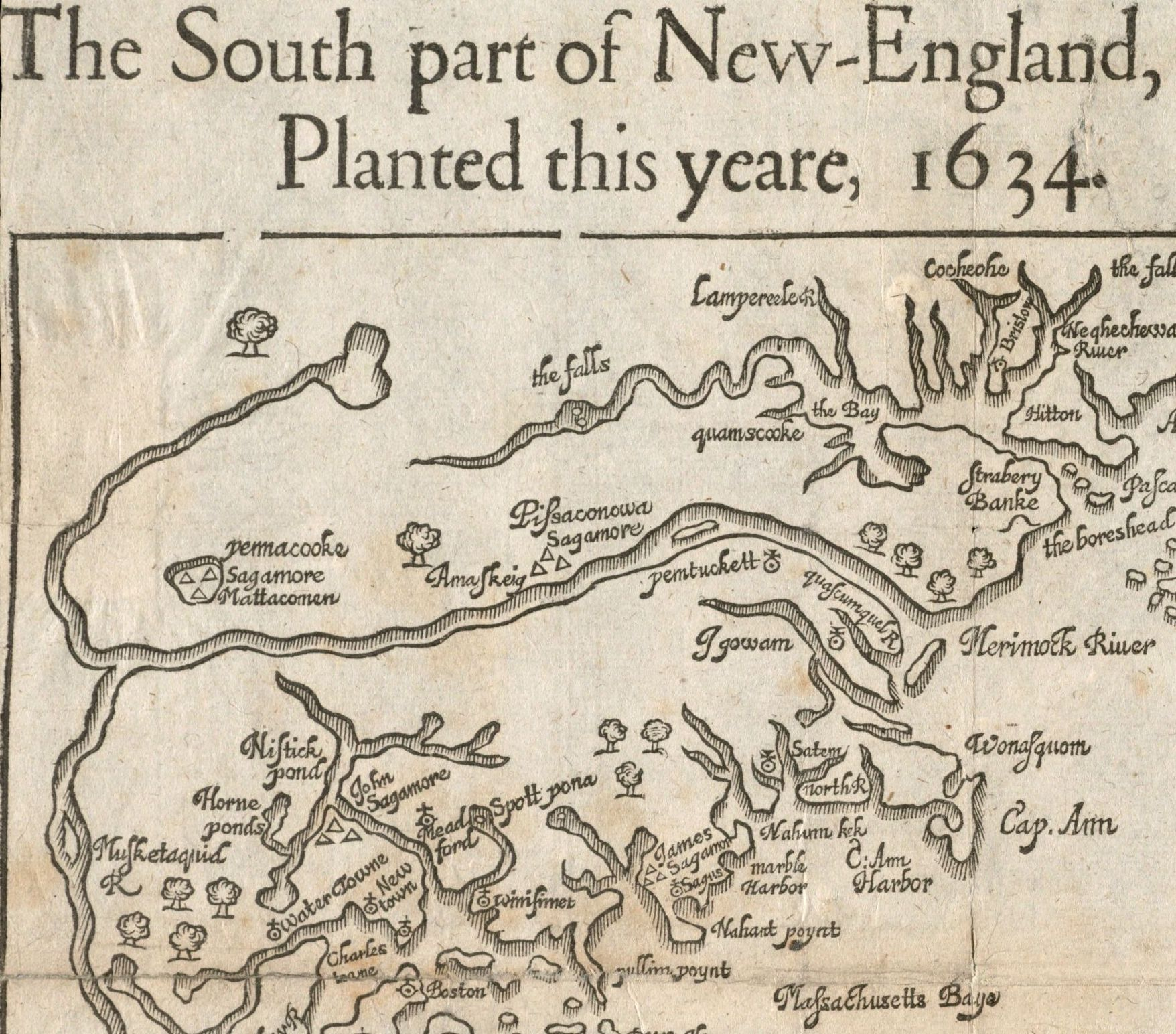
A 1634 map by William Wood showing both Pennacook bashaba Passaconaway at Amoskeag Falls and a separate settlement of Pennacook under an unknown sachem Mattacomen. The map also shows Sagamore John and Sagamore James of the Naumkeag who were politically aligned with the Pennacook.

One of the first Indian tribes to encounter European colonists, the Pennacook were devastated by infectious diseases carried by the newcomers. Suffering high mortality, they were in a weakened state and subject to raids by Mohawk of the Iroquois Confederacy from the west, and Micmac (Mi'kmaq) tribes from the north. Chief Passaconaway had a military advantage over English colonists from New England, but chose to make peace with them to avoid more deaths among his people to war. They were caught up in King Philip's War, however, and more members died. Although Wonalancet, the chief who succeeded Passaconaway, tried to maintain neutrality in the war, bands of Pennacook in western Massachusetts did not.

After King Philip's War, the colonists of New England enslaved some Pennacook captives. Some joined the Schaghticoke. Other Pennacooks fled to the Hudson Valley and on to Quebec. North-bound refugees eventually merged with other member tribes of the Wabanaki Confederacy. In the north, some Pennacook merged into the Pigwacket people, an Abenaki group. Gordon M. Day suggested that Pennacook moved north to Odanak Reserve in Quebec, and their descendants belong to the Odanak First Nation, an Abenaki government in Canada.

== Cultural heritage groups ==
Several groups in present-day Vermont claim to be Pennacook bands. The Odanak Abenaki Band Council has denounced them. Contemporary scholarship indicates that most members of such groups have a single Indigenous ancestor many generations removed or no Indigenous ancestry at all. Indigenous activists strongly criticise such claims, describing them as sometimes called race-shifting, and view them as a threat to the sovereignty of Indigenous nations and as part of a larger pattern of settler self-indigenization.

== Legacy ==
William James Sidis hypothesized in his book The Tribes and the States (1935) that the Pennacook tribes greatly influenced the democratic ideals which European settlers instituted in New England.

The Boy Scouts of America's Boston-based Spirit of Adventure Council adopted the name "Pennacook" for its Order of the Arrow lodge.

== Notable Pennacook ==
- George Tahanto, sachem, land proprietor, participant in Deerfield Raid
- Passaconaway, 17th-century sachem, or leader, of the Pennacook proper in New Hampshire
- Plausawa (c. 1700–1754), a veteran of King George's War and last known Native American living in the town of Suncook, New Hampshire
- Wonalancet (c. 1619–1697), 17th-century sachem and son of Passconaway

== See also ==
- Lake Winnipesaukee, named after a subtribe of the Pennacook
- Native American tribes in Massachusetts
- Penacook, New Hampshire
- Plausawa
- New Hampshire Historical Marker No. 238: The Pennacook
