= Plausawa =

Pennacock indian (c.1700–1754)

Plausawa (c.1700—February 9, 1754) was a Pennacook Indian who lived in what is now New Hampshire. In 1728 he was the last known Native American living in the town of Suncook. At the start of King George's War in 1740 Plausawa moved to St. Francis in Quebec and fought against the settlers of the British.

During a raid on Epsom, New Hampshire on August 21, 1747, Plausawa and his companions, Sabattis and Christo, captured Isabella McCoy and burned her farm and the neighboring farms while her husband Charles McCoy was away serving in the New Hampshire Militia. Isabelle McCoy told of the very good treatment she received by Plausawa on her way to Quebec where Plausawa sold her as a servant to a French Canadian family.

In 1752 Plausawa led another raid that captured two African-American slaves from a field in Canterbury, New Hampshire. One slave escaped to warn the town militia and Plausawa, Sabattis and Christo returned to Quebec where they sold their captive to a French officer.

In 1754, King George's War was over and the French and Indian War had yet to start, and Plausawa and Sabattis were in Canterbury again intending to trade furs with the townspeople. After some altercations they were told to leave or else.

Plausawa and Sabattis went to Boscawen, New Hampshire to the home of Peter Bowen. Bowen planned to trade with them and gave them rum to drink and when they were drunk removed the musket balls from their muskets. On the morning of February 9, 1754 Peter Bowen killed Sabattis and then Plausawa with a tomahawk during a fight. To this day it is still unclear if this was done in self-defense as Peter Bowen claimed, or in order to rob the Indians of their furs. Peter Bowen was charged with the murder of both Plausawa and Sabattis and taken to Portsmouth, New Hampshire for trial but was released from jail the night before the trial by his friends and neighbors and never stood trial.

Plausawa Hill in Pembroke, New Hampshire where Plausawa once lived is named after him. The National Weather Service operates a radio tower near its summit at an elevation of 1,000 feet (305 m).
