= Quonopohit =

Naumkeag sachem

Quonopohit (c. 1636—1712), also known as James Quannapowit, James Quanophkownatt, James Quannapohutt, and James Rumney Marsh, was the successor to whom Wenepoykin, sachem of the Naumkeag people, willed his territories in modern-day northeastern Massachusetts at the time of his death in 1684. He is known for deeding these lands to a number of Massachusetts towns in the 1680s, including Marblehead (1684), Lynn, Saugus, Swampscott, Lynnfield, Wakefield, North Reading, and Reading (1686), and Salem (1687). He is the namesake of Lake Quannapowitt in Wakefield, Massachusetts.

== Biography ==
James Quonopohit was likely born near Winnisimet and was known to English colonists by the moniker "Rumney Marsh" for the English name given to the tidal estuary in present day Saugus and Revere, Massachusetts. He was kin to the Squaw Sachem of Mystic, but may have been orphaned at a young age and raised in an English family along with his brother Thomas. James Quonopohit lived in the Praying Town of Natick prior to King Philip's War, and participated in defense of the praying towns of Natick and Nashaway against Mohawk raiding parties.

At the outset of King Philip's War in 1675, he and his brother Thomas served as guides for troops from the Massachusetts Bay Colony, among the first native people to serve in such a role in King Phillip's War. At or near Hassanamesit, James Quonopohit was involved in an action that recovered an English colonist who had been captured. He aided English colonists in recruiting Praying Indians interned on Deer Island to spy upon the Narragansett and Wampanoag, and embedded himself as a spy for the colonies, later returning intelligence to the English colonists of Massachusetts Bay regarding a planned attack on Lancaster, Massachusetts. In 1676, he joined several other praying indians in petitioning the Massachusetts General Court for mercy for recaptured natives.

After King Philip's War, James Quonopohit returned to Natick, where he received Naumkeag Sagamore George (alias Wenepoykin) upon his return from slavery in Barbados as punishment for participation in King Philip's War. After Sagamore George's death, several members of the Natick community later testified that he entrusted the care of Naumkeag lands to James Quonopohit.

In 1686, James II nullified prior colonial English charters and declared the Dominion of New England. This precipitated a rush by New England towns to formally codify their claims to land through quitclaim deeds from indigenous groups. James Quonopohit took advantage of this moment to obtain payment from English colonists who were already occupying land previously inhabited by the Naumkeag people including Lynn, Saugus, Swampscott, Lynnfield, Wakefield, North Reading, and Reading in 1686, and Salem in 1687.
