= Nanepashemet =

Pawtucket sachem (died 1619)

Pawtucket, Naumkeag leader
- Succeeded by: Squaw Sachem of Mistick, Passaconaway

Personal details
- Died: 1619 Medford, Massachusetts
- Spouse: Squaw Sachem of Mistick
- Children: Wenepoykin, Montowampate, Wonohaquaham

Nanepashemet (died 1619) was a sachem and bashabe or great leader of the Pawtucket Confederation of Abenaki peoples in present-day New England before the landing of the Pilgrims. He was a leader of Native peoples over a large part of what is now coastal Northeastern Massachusetts.

After his death in 1619, his wife, recorded by the English only as Squaw Sachem of Mistick, and three sons governed the confederation's territories, during the period of the Great Migration to New England by English Puritans from about 1620 to 1640. By 1633, only the youngest son of the three, Wenepoykin, known to the colonists as "Sagamore George," had survived a major smallpox epidemic that year that decimated the tribes. He took over his brothers' territories as sachem, except for areas that had been ceded to colonists.

== Biography ==
By c. 1607, Nanepashemet was the leader of a confederacy of tribes from the Charles River of present-day Boston, north to the Piscataqua River in Portsmouth and west to the Concord River. His influence stretched north to the Pennacook tribe, which inhabited the White Mountains region of present-day New Hampshire. As a tribal area, the Pawtucket controlled several territories: Winnisemet (around present-day Chelsea, Massachusetts), Saugus or Swampscott (Lynn), Naumkeag (Salem) (see Naumkeag people), Agawam (Ipswich), Pentucket (Haverhill), from the coast going up the Merrimack. Daniel Gookin includes Piscataqua (Portsmouth, New Hampshire and Eliot, Maine) and Accominta (York, Maine) in the Pawtucket alliance. Other sources name Mishawum (Charlestown, Massachusetts), Mistic (Medford, Massachusetts), Musketaquid (Concord, Massachusetts) and Pannukog (Concord, New Hampshire) as Pawtucket territory.

Nanepashemet was respected by his people as a warrior and a leader. His name was translated as "the Moone God" by Puritan Roger Williams in his A Key Into the Language of America. (1643/reprint 1827). Most historical accounts translate the chief's name as meaning "New Moon" (e.g., see B. B. Thatcher, 1839). Nanepashemet's tribe caught fish in the rivers and sea, dug and harvested shellfish, and raised corn on the Marblehead peninsula.

In 1617, he sent a party of warriors to aid the Penobscot tribe in their conflict with the Tarrantine of northern Maine. The Tarrantine were a warlike band, who did not practice agriculture and who supplemented their food supplies obtained by hunting with raids on the stores of more sedentary bands who cultivated crops and resided along the New England coast and its tidal rivers. They sent war parties to avenge the support of Nanepashemet for their Penobscot enemies. Sensing danger, Nanepashemet built a log fort near the Mystic River in present-day Medford. He directed his wife and children to move inland to reside with friendly Indian bands until the crisis passed.

In 1618, an epidemic of smallpox decimated his band, but Nanepashemet was spared because of his isolation in the fort. By 1619, the Tarrantines discovered his whereabouts, laid siege to the fort and ultimately killed Nanepashemet. Two years later, a party from the Plymouth Colony including Edward Winslow came across his fort and his grave.

== Descendants ==
Nanepashmet had a wife whose name has been lost, who is known only as the Squaw Sachem. Their three sons are referred to in the colonial records as Sagamore John, Sagamore James, and Sagamore George. She is often confused with Awashonks, who was the Squaw Sachem of the Sakonnets in Rhode Island, but the two women were contemporaries and not the same person.

=== Squaw Sachem ===
Squaw Sachem of Mistick ruled the Pawtucket Confederation lands capably after Nanepashmet's death. In 1639, she deeded the land of what was then Cambridge and Watertown to the colonists, an area in present-day terms that covers much of the Greater Boston area, including Newton, Arlington, Somerville, and Charlestown. She lived her last years on the west side of the Mystic Lakes, where she died in 1650. She is remembered on the Boston Women's Heritage Trail.

=== Sagamore John ===
His real name was Wonohaquaham. He controlled what is now Charlestown, Medford, Revere, Winthrop, and Chelsea. In 1631, Gov. Thomas Dudley wrote that he did not command more than 30-40 men. Sagamore John was friendly to the colonists and was known to warn them of impending attacks by unfriendly Indians. Gov. John Winthrop wrote that he died in 1633 of smallpox, "and almost all of his people."

He is mentioned in the poem Mogg Hegone (1836) by John Greenleaf Whittier.

A monument to Sagamore John was installed in West Medford in a place called Sagamore Park where Indigenous remains were discovered in 1888. Given that Wonohaquaham spent his final days in the care of and was buried by Samuel Maverick of Winnisimmet, now Chelsea, while his father Nanepashemet is known to have been killed and buried in Medford, the remains may be Nanepashemet's and not Wonohaquaham's.

=== Sagamore James ===
His real name was Montowampate. He controlled the Saugus, Lynn and Marblehead areas, and died in 1633 during the smallpox epidemic.

=== Sagamore George ===
His real name was Wenepoykin. The youngest of the three sons, he survived the 1633 smallpox epidemic, becoming known as "no-nose" in some records due to disfigurement from this disease. He inherited the lands of both his brothers from Charlestown up to Salem, and also went by the moniker George Rumney Marsh among English settlers. He was sold into slavery after participating in King Philip's War and shipped to the Caribbean island of Barbados, where he survived for eight years, then returned just before his death in 1684. His descendants signed the Indian Deeds to Marblehead (1684), Lynn, Saugus, Swampscott, Lynnfield, Wakefield, North Reading, and Reading (1686), Salem (1687).

== Namesake ==
Nanepashemet is the namesake for Nanepashemet Hill in the Middlesex Fells Reservation, and for the Nanepashemet Formation, the neoproterozoic altered basalt formation underlying Nanepashemet Hill and a significant portion of the northern Middlesex Fells, including Wanapanquin Hill, named for Wenepoykin's daughter and Nanepashemet's granddaughter.
