= Montowampate =

Pawtucket leader
- Preceded by: Nanepashemet
- Succeeded by: Wenepoykin

Personal details
- Born: c. 1609
- Died: 1633
- Cause of death: Smallpox
- Spouse: Wenunchus
- Parent(s): Nanepashemet and "Squaw Sachem"
- Known for: Pawtucket leader (called Sachem of Saugus)
- Nickname: Sagamore James

Montowampate (c. 1609–1633) was the Sachem of the Naumkeag or Pawtucket in the area of present day Saugus, Massachusetts at the time of the Puritan Great Migration. The colonists called him Sagamore James. He was one of three sons of Nanepashemet, the sachem of the entire region occupied by tribes of the confederation.

== Early life ==
Montowampate was born in about 1609 to Nanepashemet, the Great Sachem of the Pawtucket Confederation, and his wife, identified in English records only as the Squaw Sachem of Mistick. Nanepashemet's territory was divided following his death in 1619, and Montowampate was given control over the area consisting of present-day Swampscott, Nahant, Lynn, Lynnfield, Marblehead, Reading, Saugus, and Wakefield. Montowampate resided on Sagamore Hill in Lynn, a high bluff located near the head of Long Beach.

== Personal life ==
Montowampate was married to Wenunchus, daughter of Passaconaway. The two married about 1629 in Pennacook (now known as Concord, New Hampshire). Their marriage ceremony was followed by a large banquet. Not long after their marriage, Wenunchus, escorted by a number of Montowampate's men, returned to her father's territory for a visit. Once she arrived safely, Montowampate's men returned home. When Wenunchus was ready to return to Montowampate, Passaconaway sent messengers to Montowampate to tell him that his wife was ready to return and that he should send a convoy to get her.

Montowampate felt that Passaconaway should sponsor the return party, as Montowampate's men had already escorted her to her father. He thought that sending a convoy would make him and his people appear subservient to Passaconaway. Passaconaway felt that he deserved more respect from the young Sachem and told Montowampate that if he wanted Wenunchus' company, he would have to send a party for her. Montowampate still refused, telling Passaconaway that he could either send her with his own convoy or keep his daughter. Wenunchus was known to eventually return to Montowampate, but it is not recorded how the dispute between him and her father was settled.

== Relationship with other tribes ==
In 1631, Montowampate and his brother Wonohaquaham (also known as Sagamore John) met with Chief Masconomet in Agawam (present day Ipswich). Masconomet may have been seeking their assistance in his conflict with the Tarrantine. On the night of August 8, 1631, 100 Tarrantine warriors attacked Agawam. Masconomet, Montowampate, and Wonohaquaham, were all wounded and Montowampate's wife was taken captive. She was ransomed by Abraham Shurd, a colonist from Pemaquid (now Bristol, Maine), and returned to her husband on September 17, 1631.

== Relationship with colonists ==
Montowampate was described by Governor Thomas Dudley as being "of a far worse disposition" than his brother Wonohaquaham. On March 26, 1631, Montowampate went to Governor John Winthrop for assistance after he was defrauded of twenty beaver pelts by a colonist named Watts, who soon returned to England. Winthrop gave the leader a letter of introduction to Emanuel Downing, a London attorney. It is believed that Montowampate may have traveled to England to claim remuneration.

In 1632, Montowampate purchased muskets, powder, and shot from a settler named Richard Hopkins. By 1633, friction had emerged between the Pawtucket and colonists over the boundaries between the two. However, before the issue could be resolved, the tribe was hit by an outbreak of smallpox and suffered many deaths.

== Death ==
In 1633, most of the Pawtucket died during a smallpox epidemic, as they did not have acquired immunity to the new infectious disease. Montowampate died of the disease in December 1633, around the same time as his brother Wonohaquaham. Their younger brother Wenepoykin, also known as Winnepurkett, Sagamore George, George Rumney Marsh, and George No Nose (because of disfigurement from smallpox), was among the relatively few survivors. He took over both his brothers' territories and became sachem of the surviving Pawtucket.

== Legacy ==
An image of Montowampate was included on Saugus' town seal. He is depicted holding a bow and arrow in front of Round Hill and the rising sun. Montowampate's image is also included on the first floor of the new Saugus Middle High School. The image, along with some biographical data, was taken from The Saugus Centenary - One Hundredth Anniversary of the Incorporation of the Town of Saugus. 1815-1915. July 3,4,5 1915.
