= Agawam people =

Algonquian Native American people

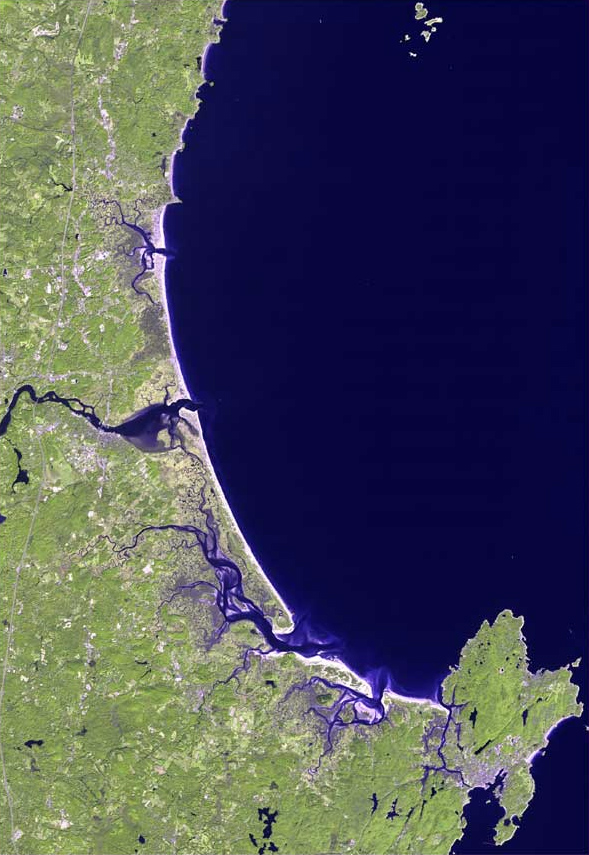
Land of the beautiful waters, eastern Essex County, Massachusetts. The northern border is the Merrimack River, shown center. The southern border is Cape Ann, shown to the south.

The Agawam were an Algonquian Native American people inhabiting the coast of New England encountered by English colonists who arrived in the early 17th century. Decimated by the same 1616-1619 epidemic as the Wampanoag and Massachusett shortly before the English colonization and fearing attacks from their hereditary enemies among the Abenaki and other tribes of present-day Maine, they invited the English to settle with them on their tribal territory.

The General Court of Massachusetts protected them by colonial law, along with their land rights and their crops. The English defended them against further attacks. The Agawam had an open invitation to enter Puritan households. Often a small number would show up as dinner guests and were fed. By the time of King Philip's War in 1675, the Agawam had been assimilated. They played no part in the war.

== Territory ==
At the time of English colonization in the 1600s, the Agawam inhabited the area from Cape Ann inland to the edge of present-day North Andover to Middleton, and from there to the Danvers River, which was the border with the Naumkeag tribe (near where Salem, Massachusetts developed).

== Name ==
Agawam has been interpreted to mean "fishing station," "fish-curing place," "ground overflowed by water," "resort for the fish of passage," "lowland," "marsh," "meadow," or "river."

The name is likely an anglicization of the native name assigned to the territory of a sovereign state consisting of the tribe. The English named the tribes after their native place names; therefore it is likely that the Native people did also; i.e., Agawam is an English exonym based on a Native endonym. The colonists created a number of anglicized place names from the territorial name: Agawam and Squam from asquam.

Varieties of the English name were used also for small tribes near Springfield, Massachusetts and Wareham, Massachusetts. There is no evidence that they were connected in any way to the Essex County Agawam. The former were of the Pocomtuc and the latter of the Wampanoag peoples. The large variety of English variants indicates an origin from different endonyms, such as "the fish-curing place." These Native people did participate in King Philip's War, causing some loss of life among the colonials with whom they had formerly resided in peace.

== Historical Record ==
In 1605, Samuel de Champlain encountered and interacted with Native people inhabiting Cape Ann during his summer voyage down the North Atlantic coast. He observed "from their numbers that these places are more populous than the others we had seen" farther north along the coast. Though the language of Cape Ann was not intelligible to the Native guides the French explorers brought on their voyage from farther north along the coast, the inhabitants of Cape Ann used birch bark canoes like other groups farther to the north, differentiating them from peoples immediately to the south who used dugout canoes.

On June 13 1630, the sagamore of Agawam, Masconomet, met with John Winthrop aboard his ship. In February 1637, Masconomet deeded a tract of land to John Winthrop the Younger in present day Ipswich (at that time known as Agawam) for his family to farm. On June 28, 1638, Masconomet sold the rest of the tribe's land to Winthrop the Younger for the English settlement of Agawam, later Ipswich, Massachusetts, in exchange for 20 pounds, essentially giving it away for protection.

On March 7, 1644 in the context of war between the Mohegans under Uncas and the Narragansetts under Miantonomo, sachem Masconomet appeared with other Massachusett sachems before the Massachusetts General Court and gave 26 fathoms of wampum in exchange for being placed under the "protection and government" of the Massachusetts Bay Colony.

== Language ==
All the Native people of the east coast of the United States and Canada from Nova Scotia to South Carolina spoke Eastern Algonquian, a language group belonging to the Algonquian family, but separated from the rest of it by the Appalachian Mountains. Eastern Algonquian included Massachusett, spoken on the coast of Massachusetts. The latter family was divided into more closely related languages, or dialects, one of which was that of the Agawam of the North Shore.

== Society ==
Each Algonquian language marks the range of a sovereign state, or tribe, ruled by a hereditary sachem, or chief. He had additional chiefs to assist him. The basis on which the position of sachem was defined was economic. He personally was considered to own all the lands used for common food gathering and production. He distributed the use of these to groups of families under sub-chiefs at his discretion. This arrangement meant that the English could negotiate with a single sachem to gain lands, but the Native Americans had a different concept of the use of land, and may not have understood that the purchased land was being permanently removed from the commons of the tribe. The sachems reigning at the time were recorded by the English in the early 17th century and "entered history". The sachem of the Agawam was Masconomet.

== See also ==
- Native American tribes in Massachusetts

== Bibliography ==
- Russell, Howard S. (1980). Indian New England Before the Mayflower. Lebanon, NH: University Press of New England. ISBN 0-87451-162-3.
