= Wenepoykin =

17th century Native American leader in Massachusetts

Pawtucket leader
- Preceded by: Montowampate / Wonohaquaham
- Succeeded by: Quonopohit

Personal details
- Born: 1616
- Died: September 1684 (aged 67–68) Natick, Massachusetts
- Spouse: Ahawayet
- Parent(s): Nanepashemet and "Squaw Sachem"
- Known for: Pawtucket Sachem
- Nickname(s): Sagamore George; George No Nose; George Rumney Marsh

Wenepoykin (1616–1684) also known as Winnepurkett, Sagamore George, George No Nose, and George Rumney Marsh was a Native American leader who was the Sachem of the Naumkeag people when English began to settle in the area.

== Early life ==
Wenepoykin was born in 1616. He was the youngest son of Nanepashemet and the Squaw Sachem of Mistick. He was 13 years old when the English began settling in the area. By that time he was sachem of Naumkeag (although he may have received assistance from an older family member until he came of age). His brothers, Montowampate and Wonohaquaham, died during the 1633 smallpox epidemic, and he became Sachem of Lynn, Massachusetts and Chelsea, Massachusetts (which also included the present-day towns of Reading, North Reading, Lynnfield, Saugus, Swampscott, Nahant, Wakefield, Marblehead, Revere, and Winthrop, as well as Deer Island). Although he survived the epidemic, Wenepoykin was disfigured from smallpox, which resulted in the nickname George No Nose. Following his mother's death, he became sachem of all of the area in Massachusetts north and east of the Charles River. On April 1, 1652, he sold Nahant to Nicholas Davison of Charlestown for "twenty pounds sterling dew many yeer".

== King Philip's War and later years ==
Wenepoykin's relationship with the English was turbulent. In 1651, he petitioned the Massachusetts General Court for return of his "just title" to the lands of his brother, Wonohaquaham. His petition was denied and his lawsuits over land claims were unsuccessful as well. He joined Metacomet in King Philip's War. He was the only member of his family to fight with the Native Americans, as his relatives were known to have sided with the English. He was taken prisoner in 1676 and sold into slavery in Barbados. In 1684, due to the intercession of John Eliot, Wenepoykin was reunited with family in Natick, Massachusetts. He died in September 1684. After King Philip's War Natick pastor Daniel Takawombait invoked "George's homecoming in the course of remembering Native lineages around Naumkeag (Salem), in order to attest to postwar Native landholdings," and in his deposition Tookumwombait stated that "Sagamore George when he came from Barbados he lived Sometime and dyed at the house of James Rumley Marsh," and "he left all this land belonging to him unto his kinsman James Rumley Marsh."

== Family ==
Wenepoykin married Ahawayet, the daughter of Ponquanum, a sub-sachem who lived on Nahant. They had one son (Poquanum) and three daughters (Pentagunsk or Cicely, Wattaquattinusk or Sarah, and Pentagoonaquah or Susanna). His family lived in the Lynn area until the time of King Philip's War, when the settled near Pawtucket Falls in Wameset (present day Lowell, Massachusetts). Following Wenepoykin's death, the colonists of Marblehead, Salem, and Lynn were able to obtain deeds for their towns from his heirs. They also relinquished their claim to Deer Island to the city of Boston.
