= Saunkskwa of Missitekw =

Massachusett leader

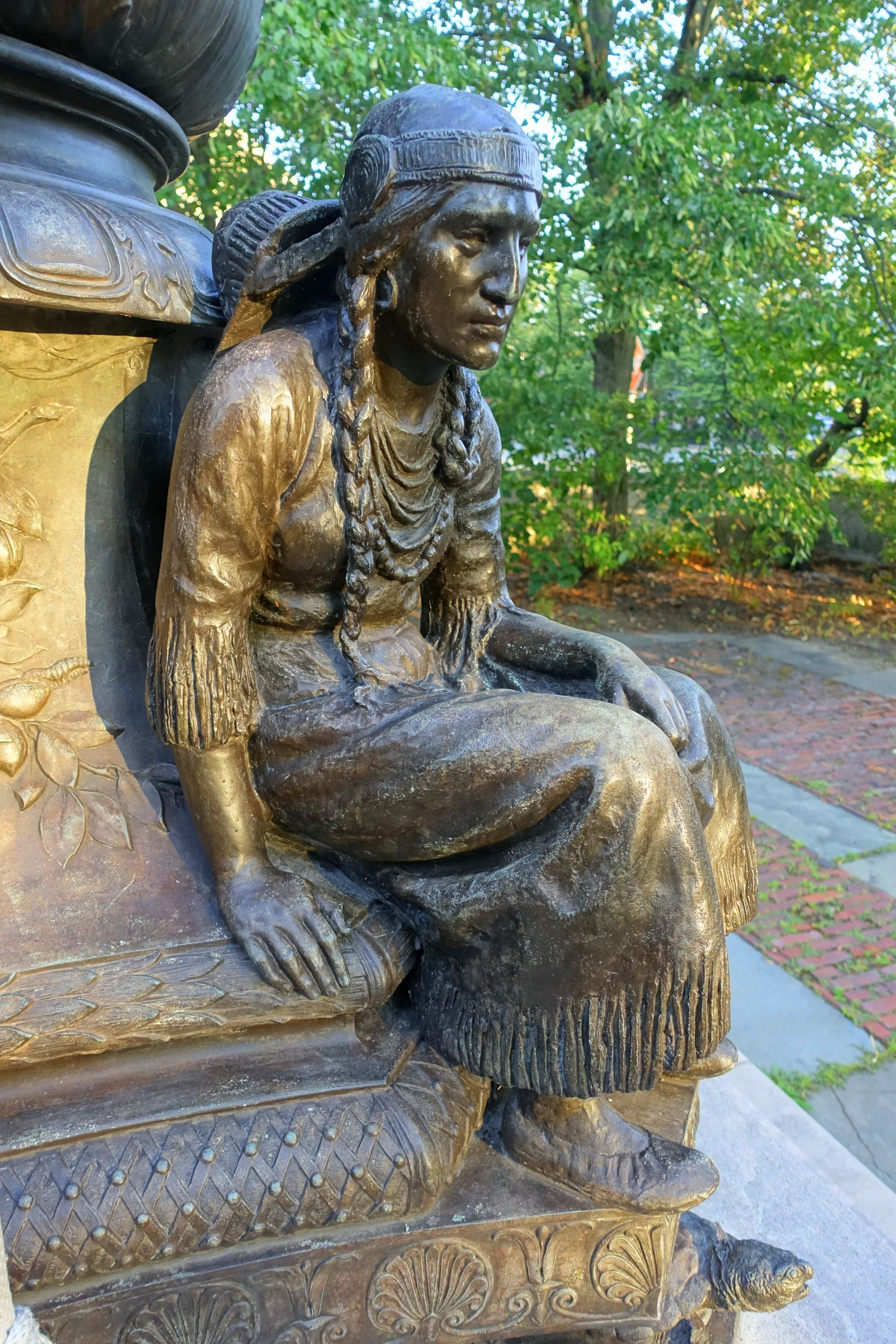
Squaw Sachem depicted as part of the Robbins Memorial Flagstaff in Arlington, Massachusetts

The Saunkskwa of Missitekw (c. 1590 – 1650 or 1667), also known as the "Squaw Sachem of Mistick", the "Massachusetts Queene", or the Saunkskwa of Mystic, was a prominent leader of a Massachusett tribe who deeded large tracts of land in eastern Massachusetts to early colonial settlers.

== Name ==
The woman known in colonial records as "Squa Sachem" appears in early 17th century English accounts under several titles, none of which record her actual name. The first mention of the Saunkskwa of the Missitekw appears in Mourt's Relation, the earliest published firsthand account in 1622 of the Mayflower Pilgrims' first year in the Plymouth Colony. Here, she is referenced as only "the Squaw Sachem, or Massachusets' queen", both titles that equate her to her political standing as opposed to her personal name. According to colonial writers during this time period, like Captain John Smith and Governor Thomas Dudley, the indigenous people of Massachusetts referred to their kings as either "sachems" or "sagamores". Further, Ellen Knight in her work detailing the beginning of Winchester, Massachusetts, reveals that the term "squa sachem was used in Colonial documents and 19th-century histories to designate the widow of a sachem". Since this time period, the term "squaw" has been deemed offensive as it evolved from the Algonquian word for "woman" into a derogatory racist and sexist slur used to demean Native American women. Later land deeds continued this pattern of omitting the Squa Sachem's actual name, only reshaping her colonial name slightly by calling her the "Squa Sachem of the Misticke".

Because the surviving documentation preserves only the name assigned to her by colonial English writers, there are ongoing discussions among historians, scholars of indigenous studies, and local communities about the appropriateness of using "Squa Sachem" as her primary identifier. Many regard the term as a colonial construction that represents English misunderstandings, and deliberate distortions, of indigenous leadership, thus making it an inadequate name for such an influential leader. Contemporary scholarship increasingly refers to her as the "Saunkskwa of Missitekw", a term which was used prominently by historian Lisa Brooks in her book Our Beloved Kin: Remapping A New History of King Philip's War and its associated website. According to Brooks, the term comes from the Algonquian language as a title for a female chief or leader and it emphasizes native political titles and regional identity in a way that the colonists names for her do not.

=== Village of Menotomy ===
A similar issue of naming also appears when looking into the names of the territories that the Squa Sachem ruled over, like the Village of Menotomy. The Algonquian word "Menotomy" was long believed to mean "swift, running water", but recent scholarship has revealed that this translation is incorrect. Although researcher Jim Porter found other possible translations for this word, including "lookout place" and "deep valley", he was unable to find an exact translation for it. Therefore, just as we will never know the Squa Sachem's true name, the translation of Menotomy has also been lost to history. Despite this profound loss, the research done by scholars into indigenous names and their translations have revealed valuable information about indigenous culture. For example, in researching if Menotomy could mean "lookout hill", Porter discovered just how important the hills of Arlington were to the Squa Sachem and her tribe. Although hills were obviously used for defense, Porter found that Nanepashemet's decision to build his homes and fortresses upon hills and the Squa Sachem's decision to choose a place that included Myopia Hill in Winchester as the last home for herself and her people suggests that there was a deeper meaning behind hills for the Sachem's community. Therefore, despite the fact that scholars like Porter may not have found exact answers to their questions about indigenous naming, the research they did along the way still provides us with invaluable information about indigenous culture.

== Family history ==
Squaw Sachem was the widow of Nanepashemet, the Sachem of the Pawtucket Confederation of Indian tribes, who died in 1619. Her given name is unknown and she was known in official deeds as the "Squaw Sachem." She had four children with Nanepashemet: Wonohaquaham, who was later known as Sagamore John, Montowampate, later known as Sagamore James, Yawate, later known as Abigail, and Wenepoykin, later known as George, George Rumney-Marsh, and No-Nose.

== Tribal leadership and land transfers ==
Squaw Sachem ruled the Pawtucket Confederation lands aggressively and capably after Nanepashmet's death. Around 1635, along with several other Native Americans, she deeded land in Concord, Massachusetts to colonists, and by that time she had remarried to a tribal priest, Wompachowet (also known as Webcowit or Webcowet), as was customary to do when a sachem passed away. In 1639 she deeded the land of what was then Cambridge and Watertown to the colonists, an area that covers much of what is now the Greater Boston area, including Newton, Arlington, Somerville, Malden, and Charlestown. In 1644, she signed a Treaty of Submission with the English in which she agreed to place her land and her people under the jurisdiction of government of the Massachusetts Bay Colony.

== Later life ==
She lived her last years at Mystic Lakes near what is now Medford, Massachusetts, where she died sometime between 1650 and 1667. She retained her title as "Queen of Mistick" up until her death. She is remembered on the Boston Women's Heritage Trail. Her sons, Wonohaquaham, Montowampate, and Wenepoykin were tribal leaders as well. She is sometimes confused with other contemporary Squaw Sachems in the region, including Awashonks and Weetamoo.

== Controversy ==
Using the Squaw Sachem of Mistick name or likeness has been protested by individuals of surrounding tribes as well as multiple social justice groups. There has been an ongoing battle (20+ years) to get rid of the use of the Sachem name and likeness as a mascot or logo in the surrounding towns. In 2020, the Sachem was removed as the mascot of the Winchester, Massachusetts public schools. Defenders of mascots often state their intention to honor Native Americans by referring to positive traits, such as fighting spirit and their being strong, brave, stoic, dedicated, and proud; opponents see these traits as being based upon stereotypes of Native Americans as savages.

The use of American Indian mascots as symbols in schools and university athletic programs is particularly troubling because schools are places of learning. These mascots are teaching stereotypical, misleading and too often, insulting images of American Indians. These negative lessons are not just affecting American Indian students; they are sending the wrong message to all students.

— Former APA President Ronald F. Levant, EdD
