= Wonohaquaham =

Native American leader

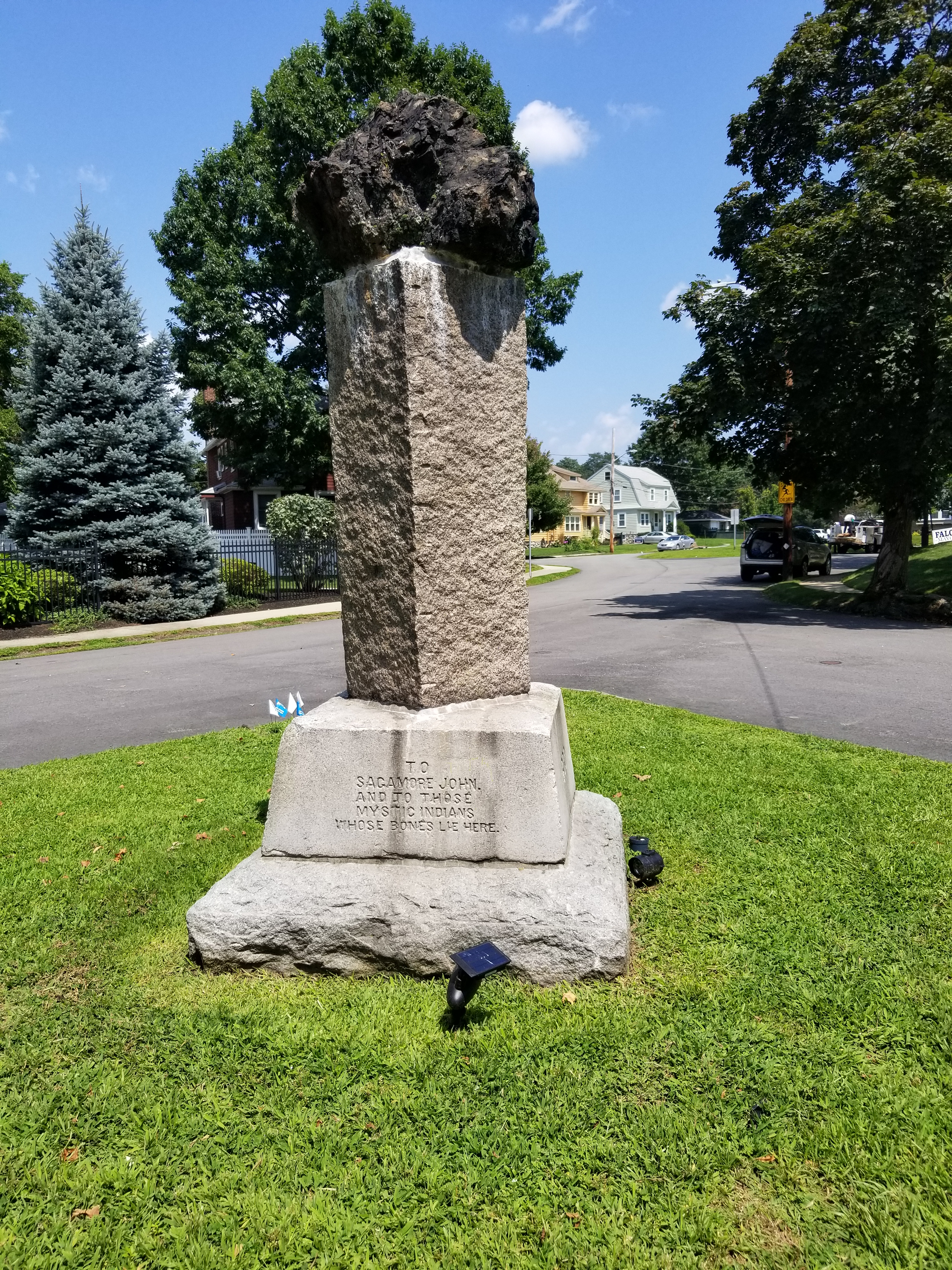
- Sagamore John burial monument in Sagamore Park in Medford

Pawtucket leader
- Preceded by: Nanepashemet
- Succeeded by: Wenepoykin

Personal details
- Died: 1633 Winnisimmet
- Parent(s): Nanepashemet and "Squaw Sachem"
- Known for: Pawtucket Sachem
- Nickname: Sagamore John

Wonohaquaham, also known as Sagamore John, was a Native American leader who was a Pawtucket Confederation Sachem when English began to settle in the area.

== Early life ==
Wonohaquaham was the oldest son of Nanepashemet and the Squaw Sachem of Mistick. A few years after his father's death, Wonohaquaham became sachem of Mishawum, which consisted of the land near the Mystic River, including present-day Chelsea, Charlestown, Malden, Everett, Revere, Somerville, Woburn, and Stoneham as well as parts of Medford, Cambridge, Arlington, and Reading. He resided in Rumney Marsh (now known as Chelsea). In 1631, Thomas Dudley wrote that Wonohaquaham led around 30 or 40 followers and that they moved locations often.

== Relationship with English colonists ==
Wonohaquaham was described as having a "gentle and good disposition" towards the English. In 1627, he gave them permission to settle in Charlestown. He was known to warn the colonists of impending attacks by unfriendly Indians. As early as 1631, Wonohaquaham, who was called Sagamore John by the colonists, spoke English wore English clothing, lived in English-style housing, and showed interest in Christianity. According to Dudley, this resulted in Wonohaquaham receiving the "scoffes of the Indians". Edward Howes wrote that he had "greate hopes" that Wonohaquaham become "civilized and a christian", however, Wonohaquaham chose to remain with the Pawtucket rather than joining the settlers. Wonohaquaham attempted to use the English court system to resolve disputes with mixed results. Many cases never made it to court, however in 1631 he received seven yards of cloth from Richard Saltonstall and fifty shillings sterling from Saltonstall's servant after the servant burnt two Pawtucket wigwams.

== Death ==
On or just before December 2, 1633, Wonohaquaham and thirty of his people died of smallpox, part of an outbreak that had also killed Massachusett sachem Chickatawbut the previous month, and would go on to devastate the native population of Piscataqua. Prior to his death, Wonohaquaham asked Reverend John Wilson to raise his two sons (only one of which survived the outbreak) and teach them of the Christian faith. He left his wampum and personal items to his mother and his land on Powder Horn Hill in Chelsea to his son. He also left gifts for John Winthrop and other colonists.

In 1888, workers in West Medford discovered the remains of 18 Native Americans, which were believed at the time to be those of Wonohaquaham and some of his followers. A 10 foot high monument was erected near the site in what is now known as Sagamore Park. However, John Winthrop's report of Wonohaquaham's death suggests that he was cared for during his final days and buried by Samuel Maverick of Winnesimmet, current day Chelsea, Massachusetts. In contrast, Wonohaquaham's father Nanepashemet was known to have been killed in a siege of his palisade fort in 1617 in Medford, where his burial site was discovered in 1621 by Edward Winslow. As such, Sagamore Park may be Nanepashemet's final resting place and not Wonohaquaham's.
