= Tarrantine =

Band of the Mi'kmaq tribe of Native Americans

The Tarrantines were a band of the Mi'kmaq tribe of Native Americans inhabiting northern New England, particularly coastal Maine. The name Tarrantine is one of the words the Massachusett people used to refer to the Mi'kmaq people.

In the first three decades of the 17th century, the Tarrantines had a warlike reputation with their southwestern neighbours. The Tarrantines were spared the epidemic of 1617 that devastated the Native American populations to their south, leaving the neighbouring tribes greatly outnumbered. Due to their proximity to fur traders of Maine and Quebec, the Tarrantines had access to firearms, giving them a technological advantage as well.

== See also ==
- Penobscot
