= Massachusetts smallpox epidemic =

1633 smallpox outbreak

The Massachusetts smallpox epidemic or colonial epidemic was a smallpox outbreak that hit Massachusetts in 1633. Smallpox outbreaks were not confined to 1633 however, and occurred nearly every ten years. Smallpox was caused by two different types of variola viruses: variola major and variola minor. The disease was hypothesized to be transmitted due to an increase in the immigration of European settlers to the region who brought Old World smallpox aboard their ships.

== Smallpox defined ==
Smallpox, is known under scientific nomenclature as Variola virus. There are two strains of Variola virus, Variola major and Variola minor. The Variola major strain is the most common and is the strain that most likely wiped out indigenous and colonist populations during the 1633 epidemic. Variola major’s weaker sister, Variola minor, was less common and only results in approximately less than 1% of deaths related to smallpox. Smallpox is thought to be ancient, and it is not native to North America.

=== Signs and symptoms of smallpox ===
The virus is spread by airborne saliva, like from a cough or saliva on a bed sheet, and can only be spread from human to human. The first stage of infection is the incubation period. The incubation period is the preliminary stage of infection where there is no knowledge of someone having smallpox, there are no physical manifestations of illness during this period. The length of the incubation period is typically 10–14 days. Following the incubation period, initial symptoms start to appear, such as a fever. Within the next few days, they start to form a rash on their skin, and tongue, and can even be found in their mouth and throat. The rash sores then form into pustules which eventually scab over and fall off. Once all of the scabs have fallen off, the person is no longer contagious.

== Colonization and the spread of Smallpox ==
Smallpox was not present in indigenous populations before the arrival of European settlers to the New World. Settlers likely brought smallpox and introduced the disease to the New World when coming on their ships. Indigenous populations had no previous encounters with smallpox, so the disease was considered an unexpected and severe killer of their peoples compared to the predominant nature and consistent presence of the disease within Europe and Asia.

=== Cases and deaths ===
There are no statistics on the number of cases of smallpox in the 1633 epidemic. Though there are rough estimates that after Europeans arrived to the New World, approximately 20 million people died.

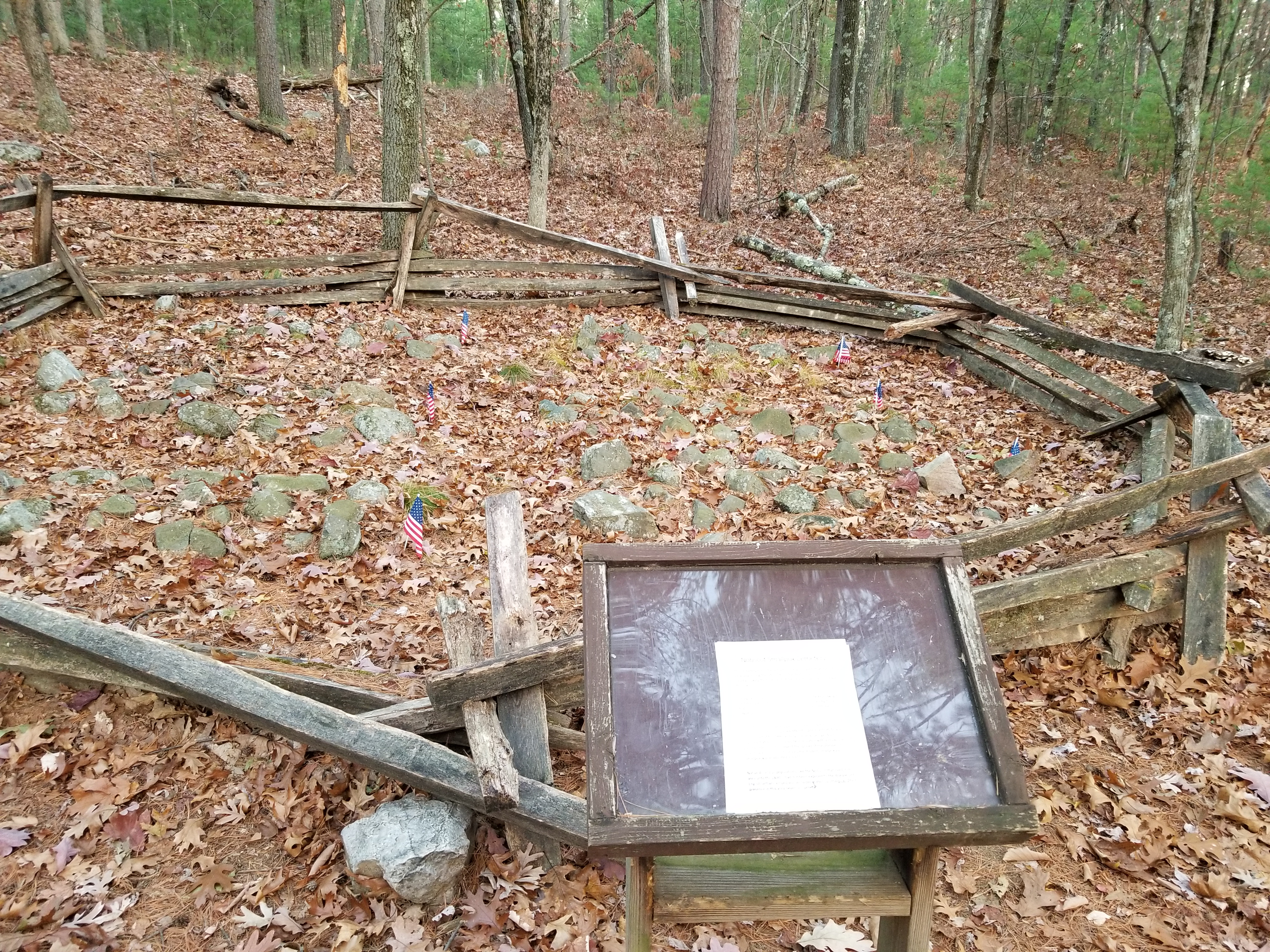
Smallpox burial ground near Nobscot Hill, this hill is near the Massachusetts Bay region.

== European infection ==
Europeans brought smallpox to North America when they first began colonizing. Most Europeans were at least partially immune to the disease due to high levels of exposure from living conditions which were often in close contact with Iivestock and in areas with large human populations. However, 20 settlers on the Mayflower were infected including their only physician Samuel Fuller.

While the European settlers remained mostly unaffected by smallpox in 1630, they witnessed their Native American neighbors fall victim to it rapidly. A New England colonist in 1630 said the Native Americans "fell down so generally of this disease as they were in the end not able to help one another, not to make a fire, nor to fetch a little water to drink, nor any to bury the dead...". Yet despite the destruction wrought by smallpox, it was seen as a gift from God by some Puritans. This included Increase Mather, a clergyman and one of Harvard College's first presidents, who stated that the smallpox epidemic was God's solution to the Native American and Puritan land disputes.

Some Christian settlers in Boston thought that they caught smallpox from being religiously sinful.

== Native American infection ==
Nearby Native Americans were not immune to smallpox and by 1618, a year after the first epidemic swept through Massachusetts, more than two-thirds of the Massachusetts Native Americans including the Mohawks, native people in the Lake Ontario area and the Iroquois were killed from infection. The epidemic continued and by 1633, smallpox infected entire tribes and left the people unable to care for each other or bury their dead. There is a hypothesis that Native populations might have had a higher concentration of deaths compared to European settlers due to "protein-calorie malnutrition" from 1500 to 1800 in the New World. The symptoms of protein-calorie malnutrition influence the immune system and also persisting weight loss, anemia, slow wound healing, and in some cases muscular dystrophy. This hypothesis is supported by skeletal evidence of Native populations.

== Effect on Indigenous populations ==
Map of Wampanoag territory in Massachusetts circa 1620

The indigenous tribe most populous in the Massachusetts Bay region during the 17th century was the Wampanoag tribe. The Wampanoag people were the first indigenous population to have contact with the European settlers arriving in Plymouth off the Mayflower. The estimates of the original Wampanoag population were approximately 12,000, though after the introduction of colonization and disease their populations were decimated to a mere 400. Due to the lack of immunity within indigenous communities, the disease ravaged their populations and caused a direct demographic shift on the populations of early American colonies. Other factors that contributed to the decimation of indigenous populations would be the dispersed nature of indigenous tribes. Due to the presence of English colonists spreading disease such as smallpox, there was a definitive demographic shift of the region from a dominant indigenous Wampanoag population to a growing English settler population.

== How Massachusetts handled the outbreak ==
=== Response to the 1633 Epidemic ===
European settlers believed that the smallpox disease was the result of their religious sinfulness. As a means of treating their conditions, people began to pray to their Christian God and participate in fasting as well as repenting for their sins. Some individuals also responded by leaving the area to avoid the disease.

However, beyond religious practices, Massachusetts colonists also developed ways to prevent the spread of smallpox. After the Puritans settled in Boston in 1630, they knew smallpox was contagious and quarantined ships arriving from infected areas. As outbreaks continued, Massachusetts finally introduced stronger public health measures. In 1701, the colony passed a law for quarantine that restricted ships from carrying contagious diseases like smallpox. Boston also decided to isolate infected residents keep them at home. In some cases, officials placed flags outside a home to warn people that someone was infected. Later in 1717, officials established a quarantine hospital on Spectacle Island to isolate people who could be carrying, or were suspected of having, the disease.

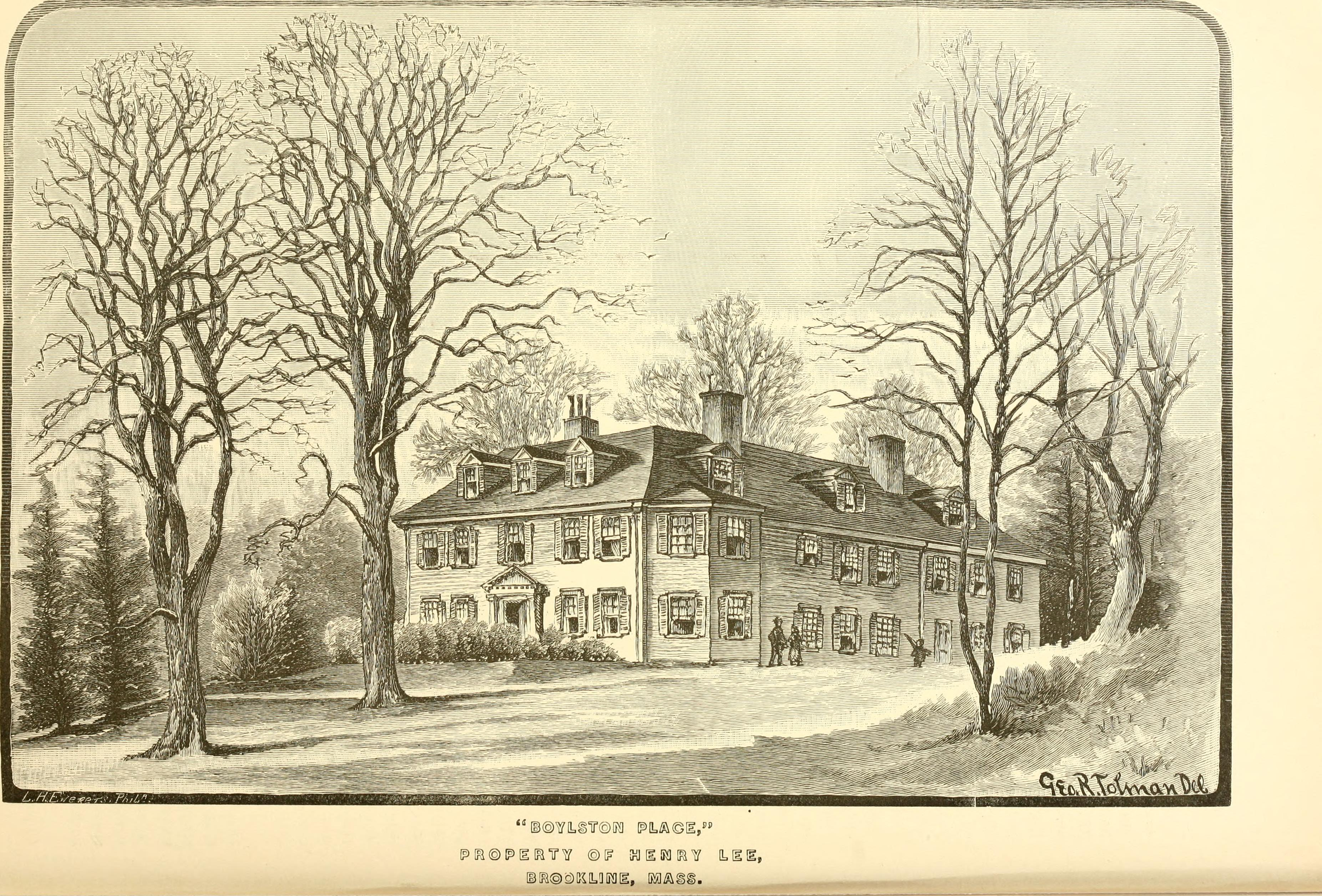
Boylston Place

=== Variolation ===
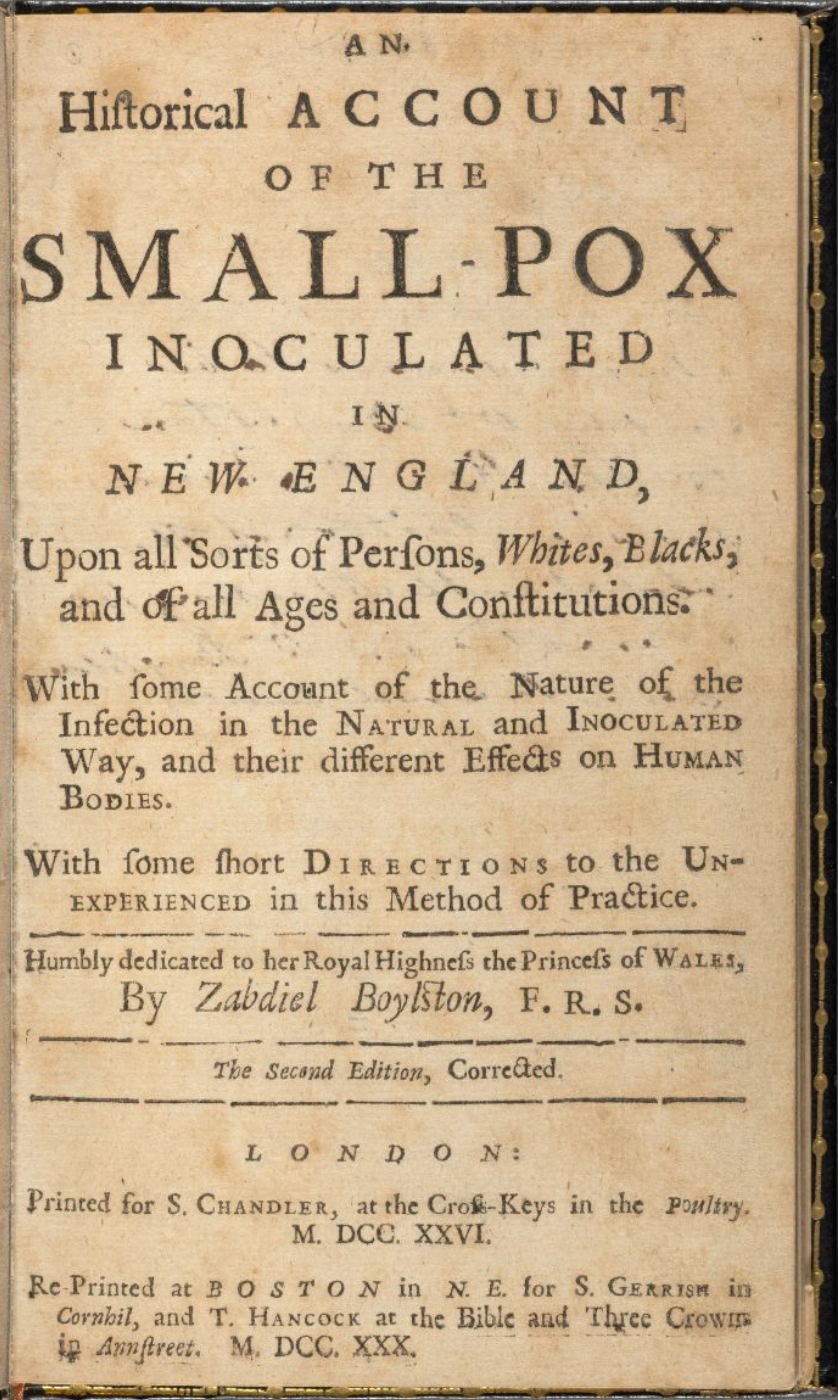
An English journal by Dr. Zabdiel Boylston from 1730 describing smallpox in the New England region

Variolation was known as inoculation in Massachusetts during this time period. This is a procedure that can be performed a few different ways. They all included taking scabs or pus from someone who had natural smallpox. People would then take the scab or pus and inject it into their skin, or rub the matter on themselves. This would allow them to have a mild form of smallpox, which had a low mortality rate. Once someone has been infected with smallpox, they would never get the virus again. This operation allowed people to be immune for the rest of their lives. This was proposed by Cotton Mather during the Boston smallpox epidemic of 1721. He sought out many doctors to perform this procedure, but the only one who was willing to try was Dr. Zabdiel Boylston. This doctor had a history of performing risky procedures, and when it was time to try inoculation he tested his hypothesis on his six-year-old son. The smallpox inoculation was deemed successful after much deliberation between government officials and other doctors. This procedure was then spread throughout the city in hopes to get the virus under control.

=== Effects on future outbreaks ===
After the events of the 1633 Massachusetts smallpox epidemic there were subsequent outbreaks of smallpox in the region. Most notably the 1721 Boston smallpox epidemic. According to a historical account in 1884 of the 1721 smallpox outbreak, more than one sixth of people would die from smallpox naturally if not treated by inoculation. Dr. Boylston was threatened to be hanged by townsfolk because they believed that the smallpox disease was an act of God and the doctor should not interfere. In 1722, there was a religious sermon that compared Dr. Boylston to Job in the Bible by saying, "the Devil was the first inoculator and Job his first patient." The last smallpox case in Massachusetts, specifically Boston, was in 1932.

== See also ==
- List of disasters in Massachusetts by death toll
