= Chaubunagungamaug =

Chaubunagungamaug may refer to:

- Lake Chaubunagungamaug, in Massachusetts
- Chaubunagungamaug Reservation, near Webster, Massachusetts
