= Cheryll Toney Holley =

Native American leader, historian and genealogist

Cheryll Toney Holley (also published as Cheryl T. Holley) is a historian, genealogist, Indigenous leader and public servant. She is the elected Sonksq (female chief) of the Hassanamisco Nipmuc Band and an elected member of the American Antiquarian Society. Her work spans community leadership, academic research, cultural preservation and historical justice initiatives.

== Early life and education ==
Holley earned a Bachelor of Arts in History with Phi Alpha Theta honors from Worcester State University (formerly Worcester State College).

== Career ==
=== Tribal and community leadership ===
Holley has served as Sonksq (chief) of the Hassanamisco Nipmuc Band since 2013. In this role, she provides spiritual guidance, community leadership and advocacy for tribal sovereignty and cultural revitalization.

She is a founding member and Clerk of the Nipmuc Indian Development Corporation, overseeing program design, grant writing and strategic planning. From 2001 to 2020, Holley directed the Hassanamisco Indian Museum, leading exhibitions, outreach and education programs until renovations began. She also served as Genealogy Chair of the Nipmuc Nation from 2000 to 2014, where she reviewed lineage applications and trained community members in Nipmuc history and genealogy.

=== Academic and research roles ===
In 2023, Holley was appointed the Charles Bullard Fellow in Forest Research at the Harvard Forest, Harvard University. Her work compares Western conservation methods with Indigenous-led stewardship practices, centering Nipmuc ecological knowledge and sustainable land relations.

At Brown University, she has served as a Visiting Scholar in Slavery and Justice (2024–present) and Mellon Visiting Fellow (2022–2023) at the Simmons Center for the Study of Slavery and Justice. In these roles, she supports the *Reimagining New England Histories* program, fostering collaboration between academic institutions and Indigenous and Black communities and serving on the exhibit and K–12 Curriculum Committees.

Holley also founded and operates PastTense Historic Research, a business dedicated to uncovering and sharing the histories of Indigenous and African-descended peoples of New England and New York. She maintains the *For All My Relations* genealogy blog and digital archives, and frequently lectures at libraries, universities, and museums across the region.

=== Health care career ===
Before focusing full-time on research and leadership, Holley worked for over three decades at UMass Memorial Medical Center in Worcester, Massachusetts, beginning as a nurse in 1990 and rising to Manager of Ambulatory Services for Dermatology and Plastic Surgery. She oversaw clinic operations, budgeting, staffing, and long-range planning.

== Awards and recognition ==
Holley has been honored for her scholarship and leadership with multiple awards:

- Katherine Forbes Erskine Award for Arts & Culture, YWCA Central Massachusetts (2022).
- Honorary Doctor of Public Service, University of Massachusetts Amherst (2023).
- Massachusetts Governor’s Award in the Humanities (2024).

== Affiliations ==
Holley is an elected member of the American Antiquarian Society. She also serves on several regional and state committees, including the Massachusetts Commission on Indian Affairs (1998–2008), the Environmental Justice Council of Massachusetts (2022–present), and the Steering Committee of the Worcester Black History Project.

== Selected publications ==
- “Through the Lens of a Community That Defied Expectations: African Descendants & Indigenous Peoples in Worcester County.” *Worcester Historical Museum*, 2018.
- “Practicing Traditions in Uncommon Ways: Nipmucs in Community.” *University of Massachusetts Amherst*, 2015.
- Contributions to *Dawnland Voices: An Anthology of Writing from Indigenous New England* (University of Nebraska Press, 2014).
- Foreword to *Historical Archaeology and Indigenous Collaboration: Discovering Histories That Have Futures* (University Press of Florida, 2019).
- *For All My Relations* blog and digital archives (2010–present).

== See also ==
- Nipmuc people
- List of Native American politicians
- Native American women in politics
