= John Wompas =

- Born: c. 1637-1642; Nipmuc Country, Massachusetts
- Died: September 1679 (aged 36–42); London, England
- Other names: John White, John Wampus, Wompony, Wampowess, Womponege, John Indian
- Education: Harvard College
- Spouse: Ann Prask
- Children: Anna Wompas
- Parents: Wampooas (father); Wampooas' wife (name unrecorded) (mother)
- Relatives: Totherswamp (Thomas Tray), paternal uncle; Anthony (Anthony Tray), paternal uncle; John Awassamog; Norwaruunt; Pomhammell

Signature
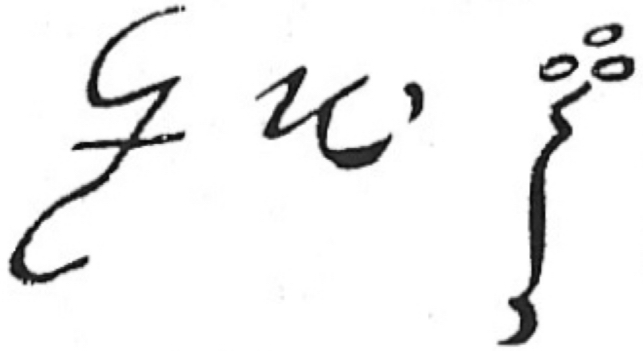

John Wompas (c. 1637-1642 – 1679) was a Nipmuc man born around 1637 in Nipmuc Country, in what would become the state of Massachusetts. He spent the first half of his childhood among his Native kin and the second half living with an English family in Roxbury, Massachusetts Bay Colony. This dual upbringing gave him fluency in the languages and customs of both Nipmuc and colonial English worlds. He used his cross-cultural knowledge largely for personal economic and political gain, but at the end of his life he also turned it to the benefit of his Nipmuc kin.

Compared to such seventeenth-century Native figures as Massasoit, Metacomet (King Philip), Weetamoo, and Squanto, John Wompas is an obscure figure, little noted by contemporaries or later historians. The best known Native individuals of the past were political leaders and intermediaries, and Wompas was neither. Despite his past and present obscurity, Wompas lived a remarkably full life on two continents. He was deeply enmeshed in the economic and political workings of the English empire, particularly the land market; he was one of the few American Indians to study at Harvard College during the seventeenth century; he was one of the first American Indians to work as a commercial transatlantic sailor, a vocation that enabled him to sail to London at least twice and obtain an audience with King Charles II. Wompas died in September 1679 in London, England. After his death, his will became instrumental in preserving the lands of the Hassanamisco Nipmuc people. Some of that land is still in Nipmuc possession today—the only land in Massachusetts that has never left Native ownership.

== Early life ==
=== Nipmuc Country and Nonantum ===
John Wompas was born sometime between 1637 and 1642 in Nipmuc Country, today's central Massachusetts. His father, Wampooas, was a Nipmuc from the Native town of Hassanamesit. In 1646, Wampooas moved his family to the Christian Indian town of Nonantum after he and his wife accepted Christian baptism. John Eliot, the "Apostle to the Indians," described both of John's parents as committed converts who exerted a powerful influence on their fellow Nipmucs. Eliot recorded insightful questions that Wompooas's wife asked during his teaching sessions, as well as the speech she gave her children before her death, and he reported that Wampooas urged his fellow Christian Indians to prepare to settle and establish a Native congregation at Natick, "that there the Lord might rule over you, that you might make a Church, and have the Ordinance of God among you." John's mother died at Nonantum in 1647.

Possibly because of a desire for John to gain useful English skills and knowledge, Wampooas sent John to live with English colonists in Roxbury, a Massachusetts Bay Colony town, sometime between 1646 and 1651. Wampooas himself died in 1651.

=== Roxbury ===
In Roxbury, John Wompas lived with a middle-aged couple named Isaac and Elizabeth Heath. Isaac Heath, the leading elder of Roxbury's Congregational Church, was a close friend of John Eliot. Wompas became fluent in English as he assisted the Heaths in their farm labor, participated in daily religious observance, and attended church on Sundays. He was also one of a handful of Nipmuc and Massachusett Indians who attended the Roxbury grammar school run by Daniel Weld. John moved from Roxbury to Cambridge, Massachusetts, sometime after 1657 to further his education.

== Education ==
John's early education in Nipmuc Country prepared him for his adult role in the community, including hunting, fishing, tracking animals, wayfinding by the stars, and learning the religion and traditions of his people. After his family's move to Nonantum, John learned about Native Christian religious practices and beliefs.

In Roxbury, John Wompas attended the grammar school, one of only a few schools in the colony that provided instruction in the Latin and Greek required for admission to Harvard College. He learned to speak, read, and write in English, Latin, and Greek, and he later improved those skills by transferring to the Cambridge Grammar School, whose instructor, Elijah Corlett, was proficient in teaching Native students.

=== Harvard College ===
John Wompas was one of only a handful of American Indians to attend Harvard in the seventeenth century. He and the other Native students were financially supported by the Society for the Propagation of the Gospel in New England, with the specific intent that they become Christian ministers among their Native kin. Wompas began his studies at Harvard in 1665, when he was in his late twenties. John's instruction at Harvard was in Latin, just as it was for the English students, and he was expected to answer questions and participate in disputations in Latin. However, because Native students were intended for the Native ministry, they were encouraged to continue using their Native language outside of class. Around 1668, Wompas became disenchanted with his studies and left Harvard to pursue a career as a sailor.

== Marriage and Family ==
John Wompas married Ann Prask on May 21, 1661. A fellow resident of Roxbury, Ann was brought there as a child captive of the Pequot War. She was a slave in the household of Joshua and Mary Hewes. John and Ann's marriage was the only Native American union recorded in the official records of seventeenth-century Boston. Under the English law of coverture, the marriage gave Wompas the legal right to Ann's property, including a large parcel of land in Connecticut Colony left to her by her father shortly before their marriage. Wompas quickly began selling some of this land to English investors, and his profits may have funded his purchase of a house near Boston Common in 1667. Nineteenth-century antiquarians liked to point out that this house, the present site of St. Paul's Episcopal Church, was the only structure in seventeenth-century Boston owned and occupied by Indians. On February 7, 1664, John and Ann Wompas's only known child, a daughter named Anna Wompas, was born in Boston. Like John and Ann's marriage, Anna's birth was recorded in seventeenth-century Boston's official records. Anna appears to have lived for at least a year after her birth, but she died before 1673.

== Land Speculation ==
One of John Wompas's main sources of income was selling Native land to English colonists, using his knowledge of both Native and English land customs to legitimate his transactions and secure far higher prices for his sales than his Native kin and friends were able to command. He oversaw the sale of some of the land that his wife, Ann Prask, inherited from her father in the vicinity of today's Fairfield, Connecticut, and reported earning 530 pounds from the sale, an unheard of price during a time when English colonists paid significantly less for land purchased from American Indians than for land purchased from fellow colonists. In the early 1670s, Wompas's fluency in English language and customs convinced Nipmuc leaders to appoint him as an agent to defend their lands against English encroachments. While Wompas did take steps toward that end, including initiating a lawsuit against an English squatter in Nipmuc Country, he also took the opportunity to line his own pockets by selling some of the land he was supposed to protect. Wompas cheated Englishmen as well as Indians by selling the same plots of land near Quansigamog Pond to multiple buyers. Such actions created legal tangles that prevented English claimants from securing these land parcels for nearly fifty years after Wompas's death.

== Later life ==
=== Transatlantic sailor ===
After leaving Harvard in 1668, John Wompas became a sailor, one of the earliest American Indians known to participate in the transatlantic trade. This decision probably also made him one of the most highly educated common sailors in the Atlantic World, one "who could recite and read Latin and Greek, along with a smattering of Syrian, Chaldaic, and Hebrew." Common sailors like Wompas experienced hard, tedious labor, danger, and disease in their line of work, but their wages, which included room and board while at sea, were comparable to or higher than those of daily laborers on land. His life as a sailor connected Wompas to a transatlantic sailing community in places such as Boston and New York in the colonies and the London suburbs of Ratcliffe and Stepney in England. Fellow sailors became some of Wompas's closest friends as well as customers for his land sales.

=== England ===
Between 1668 and 1676, Wompas divided his time between his work as an Atlantic sailor and his business selling Native land. By 1674, in response to complaints from Nipmuc leaders angry over Wompas selling land without their permission, the Massachusetts government prohibited Wompas from future land sales. In response, Wompas sailed to England in late 1674, intent on appealing to the Crown. Unable to secure a royal audience right away, Wompas fell into debt and ended up in a London debtors' prison. While there, he sent a petition to King Charles II. The king directed his secretary of state to write Massachusetts Governor John Leverett on behalf of John Wompas, directing that "he may have Justice done him, & what favour the matter will bear." Not only did this letter command justice for John Wompas, but by referring to Wompas as "our subject," it affirmed the Crown's recognition of the status of American Indians as subjects to the British crown.

==== Audience with the King ====
With the assistance of a London acquaintance to whom he deeded land in Massachusetts, Wompas obtained his freedom from debtors' prison and accompanied Massachusetts agents William Stoughton and Peter Bulkeley to their audience with the king in December 1676. They were in London to answer a royal summons directing Massachusetts leaders to explain their violations of British law, but their primary goal was to renew Massachusetts's colonial charter. They brought with them two literate, Christianized Nipmuc boys to counter complaints that the colony had abused Native people. Wompas probably was able to tag along at the royal audience because he could act as a translator between the boys and the king. By participating in this and perhaps other meetings between the king and the colony agents Wompas became well informed of the tensions that existed between the crown and Massachusetts.

== Return to New England ==
=== Boston ===
John Wompas returned to Boston on May 15, 1677. While he was away, his wife had died and their house had passed into English hands. The situation for American Indians had also deteriorated drastically in Wompas's absence; the fighting of King Philip's War between English and Native people in New England led to widespread suspicion of Indians, including those allied with the English, and restrictions on where Natives could live, travel, and do business.

John Wompas delivered the king's letter to Governor Leverett in June 1677, expecting that he would remove the restrictions on Wompas's land sales. However, the governor instead referred the case to the Indian Court presided over by Daniel Gookin. During the trial in June 1677, John Wompas was denounced by Nipmuc leaders and his uncles Anthony and Thomas Tray, who denied his authority to sell Nipmuc lands without the authorization of the sachem (Native leader) and the permission of fellow Nipmuc claimants to the land. Thwarted in his efforts to secure legal permission to sell land, Wompas began to sell it illegally. He also began broadcasting his knowledge of the colony's perilous political standing and publicly complaining about colony leaders' treatment of him and other Native people in the area.

== Prison ==
John Wompas spent time in prison at several points in his life:

- Spring 1673: Wompas was charged with drunkenness after a public fight with his wife Ann. He was held in the Boston prison until his fines were paid.
- February - December 1676: Wompas spent nearly a year in debtors' prison in London, from February to December 1676.
- September 1677: Wompas openly mocked a crowd of townspeople in Cambridge, Massachusetts, for their military ineptness and their shaky political standing before the Crown. He also threatened them, asking "whether they never saw an Indian before" and, when they answered in the affirmative, replying, "You shall feel them too." For these threats, the town constable secured Wompas in the Cambridge jail. Wompas quickly escaped, was recaptured, and was imprisoned in the Boston jail, from which he was released on bond the following month.
- May 1678: Wompas traveled to Fairfield, Connecticut, to claim land his wife had inherited from her father. Town leaders rejected his claims and imprisoned him. After his release, Wompas petitioned the Connecticut General Court for the land, but the court ruled against him.

== Death ==
After Wompas's attempt to claim land in Connecticut, he traveled south to New York, obtained a position on a ship's crew, and sailed back to England. While there, he wrote a second petition to King Charles II complaining of colonial mistreatment of himself and all Indians in New England. The king wrote another letter on Wompas's behalf, proclaiming that "not only the Petitioner but all such Indians of New England as are his subjects and submit peaceably and quietly to his Majesty's Government, shall likewise participate in his Royall Protection," and sent it to the governor of Connecticut on March 28, 1679. However, John Wompas never returned to New England. In the late summer of 1679, Wompas wrote a will in which he claimed the status of a sachem and bequeathed the Nipmuc land around Hassanamesit to his Nipmuc relatives. He died in September 1679 in London, England. The fact that Wompas created a will before he died indicates that his death was not unexpected, but the exact cause of his death is unknown.

== Legacy ==
John Wompas's legally-binding will helped protect the land of the Hassanamesit Nipmuc people. While he left a large amount of land to English colleagues, he specifically reserved all of Hassanamesit for his Nipmuc kinsmen John Awassamog, Norwaruunt, and Pomhammell. Because of this bequest, English beneficiaries of the will were forced to set aside four square miles of land for the Nipmucs within the eight square miles of the township granted to them by the Massachusetts General Court in 1704. Some of that four square miles of land is still in Nipmuc possession today—the only land in Massachusetts that has never left Native hands.
