= Zara Cisco Brough =

Native American chief and politician

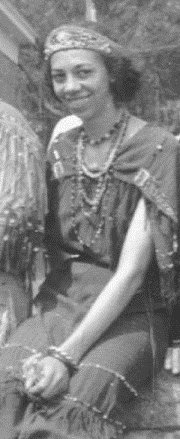
- Brough in 1957

Nipmuc Nation leader
- Preceded by: Sarah Cisco Sullivan

Personal details
- Born: January 3, 1919 New York City, New York
- Died: January 7, 1988 (aged 69) Massachusetts
- Cause of death: Parkinson's disease
- Nickname: Princess White Flower

Zara Cisco Brough (January 3, 1919 – January 7, 1988), also called Princess White Flower, served as the Chief of the Nipmuc Nation, a state-recognized tribe in Massachusetts, from 1962 until 1987. She is best known for her work to preserve Nipmuc heritage.

During her lifetime she worked as an electronics engineer, fashion designer, drafter, technical writer, and supervisor of government projects. She held the post of "State commissioner for Indian Affairs" from 1974 to 1984. On January 7, 1988, Brough died at a Westborough, Massachusetts, nursing home from Parkinson's disease at the age of 68.

In January 2009 a Department of Youth Services facility located at 288 Lyman Street in the town of Westborough was formally named the Zara Cisco Brough "Princess White Flower" Facility through House Bill 3231 in 2009.

== Ancestry and childhood ==
Zara Cisco Brough, also spelled Ciscoe, was born on January 3, 1919, in New York City, New York. She was the daughter of Sarah Cisco Sullivan and Charles Brough, and the granddaughter of James Lemuel Cisco. Her ancestry is traced back to William of Sudbury (1596–1676), who was also known by the names Naaos, Naoas, and Nataous. He served as a deacon in the Native church at Hassanamesit, which later came to be known as Grafton. According to the account by Richard W. Cogley in the New England Historical and Genealogical Register, William of Sudbury fathered four sons, one of whom was James Printer (died 1712), who worked as a typesetter in Cambridge, Massachusetts, and was credited for his assistance in the Algonquin language Eliot Indian Bible, the first translation of the Bible into a native language. Zara Cisco was descended from James Printer.

Brough's grandfather Chief James Lemeul Ciscoe was named chief of the Hassanamisco Nipmuc, and her great-grandfather Samuel C. Cisco was a Chief of the Narragansett people. Her mother was also a chief the Nipmuc Nation.

Brough spent her childhood at the Hassanamisco Indian reservation in Grafton, Massachusetts. According to her own account her interest in native Indian cultural heritage and history was sparked by her grandfather, who used to tell her about tribal traditions and rituals during her childhood. Brough received her primary education from the Grafton school system.

== Early career ==
Brough attended engineering college in Washington D.C and went on to take special courses at the New York University, New York. She took up residence after completing her course and, working as a draftsperson, fashion designer, technical writer and supervisor of government projects. She also co-owned a textile printing company during her stay in Washington D.C.

Brough served as a civilian consultant to the United States Army Air Forces during World War II. In recognition of her work the United States Air force awarded her the United States Air Force Award of Superior Performance.

== Return home ==
In 1959 she left New York to return home to take care of her ageing mother. After her arrival, Brough accepted the job of vice president of the former Ibis Corporation located in Waltham, Massachusetts, which specialized in electronic and environmental consultation.

== Position as chief and political advocacy ==
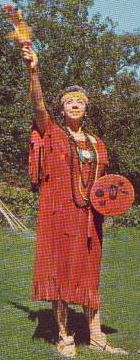
Zara Cisco Brough, Nipmuc Nation chief

Having returned to her ancestral home, Brought sought involvement in activist and political organizations. In the coming years, she worked in defense of the Nipmuc nation from cultural and historical dissolution. Brough was named chief of the Nipmuc people in 1959. In 1962 she founded the Hassanamisco Museum which was nicknamed "Memorial to the Eastern American Indian" to document and preserve Nipmuc heritage. The mission of the museum has now extended to include the historical preservation of hundreds of other Native American ethnic groups. The Hassanamisco Museum contains displays of artifacts, manuscripts, crafts, tribally specific legends, and news clippings pertaining to many Native American ethnic groups. She was also responsible for the acquisition of dredging rights to Lake Ripple on behalf the Nipmuc Nation.

Brough helped establish the Massachusetts Commission on Indian Affairs, which was created in 1974. Being a founding member of the commission, she was nominated for the position of Commissioner of Indian Affairs, a post which she held for 8 years from 1976 to 1984. During her tenure as the commissioner, she successfully lobbied to amend the charter of the Hassanamisco Foundation. According to the new amendments, Nipmuc reservation lands will never leave Nipmuc hands even if the Cisco bloodline comes to an end. The Cisco Homestead was also later recognized as an endangered historic resource and came under federal protection in 2009. Brough was actively involved in the Council of New England Indians. She organized the Council and established the Nipmuc branch of the council.

Brough served on the Grafton Planning Board and Central Massachusetts Planning Board, and was involved in a number of other organizations such as the Grafton Forest Association, the Framingham Historical Society, the National Geographic Society, the Natural History Museum of New York, Mendon Historical Society, National Congress of American Indians, Technical Writers and Publishers Society, Worcester Art Museum, the Board of Trustees of the Riverside, Old and Indian Cemeteries, Grafton Taxpayers Association and the Grafton Player's Club. In addition to her involvement with numerous committees she chaired the board of directors of the Hassanamisco Reservation Foundation Trust, which works to promote and ensure preservation of Nipmuc tribal lands and heritage.

== Career as an author ==
In addition to her career as a consultant and position of leadership as Chief of the Nipmuc Nation, Brough was a published writer. In her capacity as an electronics engineer, worked in collaboration with Vance Parker and Brent Haslam and published research detailing theoretical applications of "Pattern Ratio Technique" to arrays. The findings were published in a 1969 scholastic issue of Defense Technical Information Center.

Her published works include poetry, retellings of the history of the Nipmuc people, and books of Nipmuc recipes. For her committed involvement with the community she was awarded the Camp Fire Girls Certificate of Appreciation of Outstanding Service in 1970.

== Legacy ==
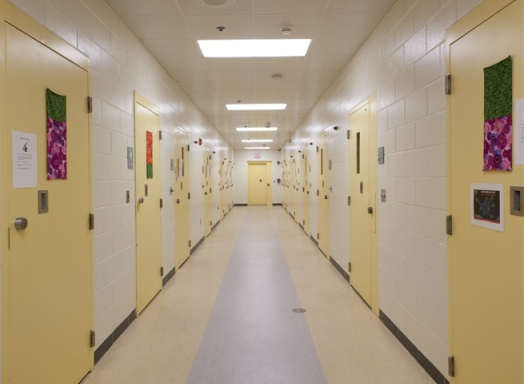
Department of Youth Services (DYS) facility for teenage girls opened on the grounds of Westborough State Hospital named after Zara Cisco Brough

Brough is well known for her work to preserve Nipmuc heritage. Her most concerted effort was a petition for Nipmucs to be granted the status of one of the Federally recognized tribes of the Native American peoples. This resulted in the Nipmuc being placed on "active consideration" for federal recognition by 11 July 1995. Although the tribe gained state recognition, they were denied federal recognition.

In recognition of her efforts for the betterment of the community a Massachusetts Department of Youth Services Facility located at 288 Lyman Street in Westborough was formally named as the Zara Cisco Brough "Princess White Flower" Facility through the House Bill 3231 in 2009. It had previously been named thus in 2007 but the official act was passed in 2009.
