= Webster/Dudley Band of Chaubunagungamaug Nipmuck Indians =

Cultural heritage group and nonprofit in Massachusetts, U.S.

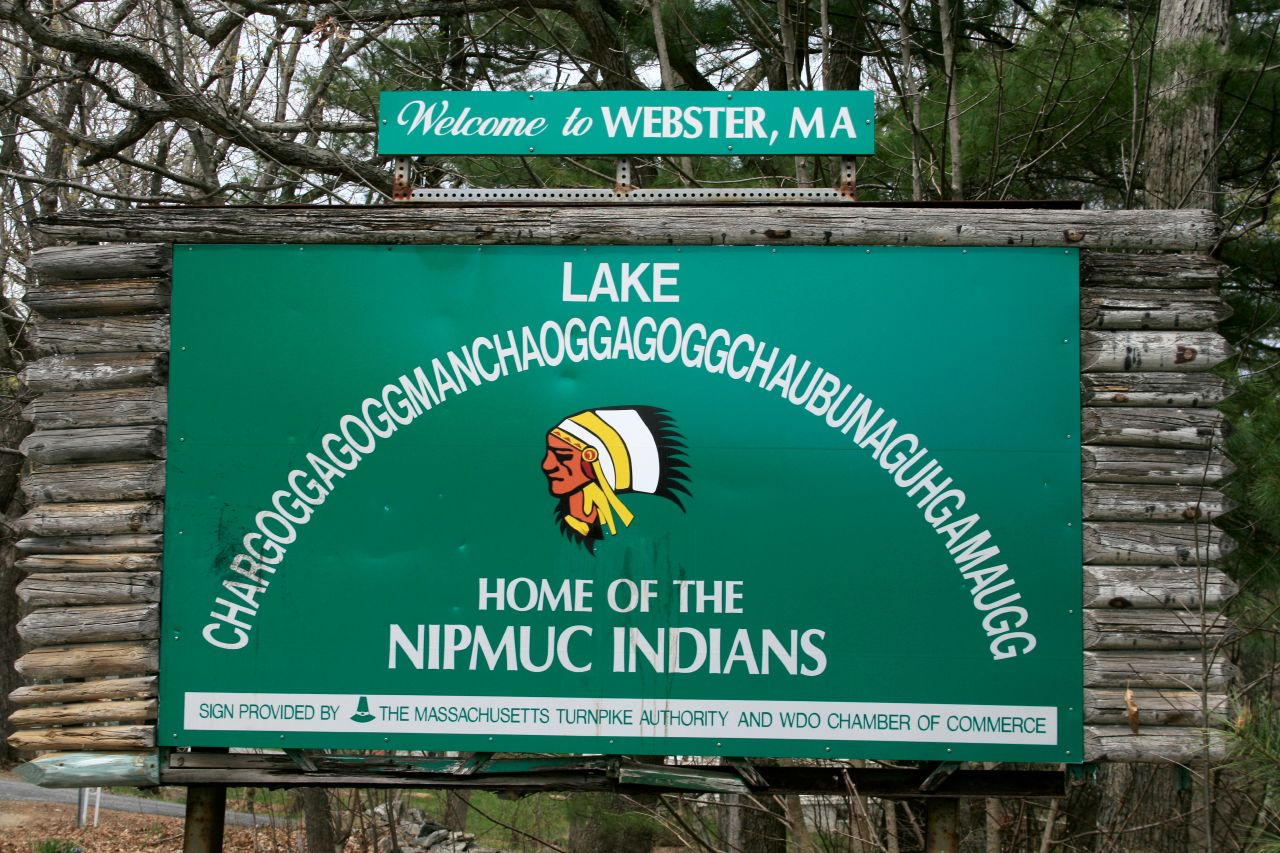

Total population
- 354 (2002).

Regions with significant populations
- United States of America (Massachusetts and Connecticut).

Languages
- English, Nipmuck, Massachusett

Religion
- Christianity, Indigenous religion

Related ethnic groups
- Other Nipmuc people, Massachusett, Wampanoag, Narragansett, Pennacook, Pocomtuc, Pequot, Mohegan and other Algonquian peoples

The Webster/Dudley Band of Chaubunagungamaug Nipmuck Indians, also known as the Chaubunagungamaug, Chaubunagungamaug Nipmuck, Pegan or Dudley/Webster Indians, is a cultural heritage group identifying as descendants of the Nipmuc people.

Members state they descend from the historic Dudley/Webster Nipmuc tribal entity. 87% of the membership of the Webster/Dudley Band of Chaubunagungamaug were able to document their descent from the Dudley/Webster Nipmuc when they (unsuccessfully) petitioned for federal acknowledgement.

Contact with English settlers began in the 1630s, as the colonists began following the Indian trails to new settlements in the Pioneer Valley or the Pequot War (1634-1638). By the 1670s, the Chaubunagungamaug Nipmuck came under the nominal control of the Massachusetts Bay Colony and under the expanding missionary influence of the Rev. John Eliot, leading to the establishment of a 'Praying Town of Chabanakongkomun' in 1674. After the ravages of King Philip's War (1675-1676), Black James and other Nipmuck sellers reserved five miles square for themselves and their heirs in a deed of February 10, 1681/2, and the General Court confirmed the surveyed reserve in 1685. Most of the reserve was sold over the following century; in 1797 the remaining 200 acres were exchanged for a different tract of 26 acres, which was sold at auction in 1887 under the Massachusetts Indian Enfranchisement Act of 1869.

The Webster/Dudley Band incorporated in 1981. Private land in Oxford, Massachusetts and Thompson, Connecticut is used by the group as its homebase. Efforts are being made to identify and acquire land in Webster. Members worked closely with the Hassanamisco Nipmuc under Nipmuc Nation, especially in regard to federal recognition, but the group split from Nipmuc Nation in 1996. Many of the Chaubunagungamaug Nipmuck remain affiliated with Nipmuc Nation, where they are counted among the Hassanamisco Nipmuc. The group was denied federal recognition as an Indian tribe in 2001, 2004, and 2007 decisions from the Bureau of Indian Affairs due to their failure to meet three of the seven mandatory criteria for federal acknowledgment. The band is state acknowledged.

== Ethnonyms ==
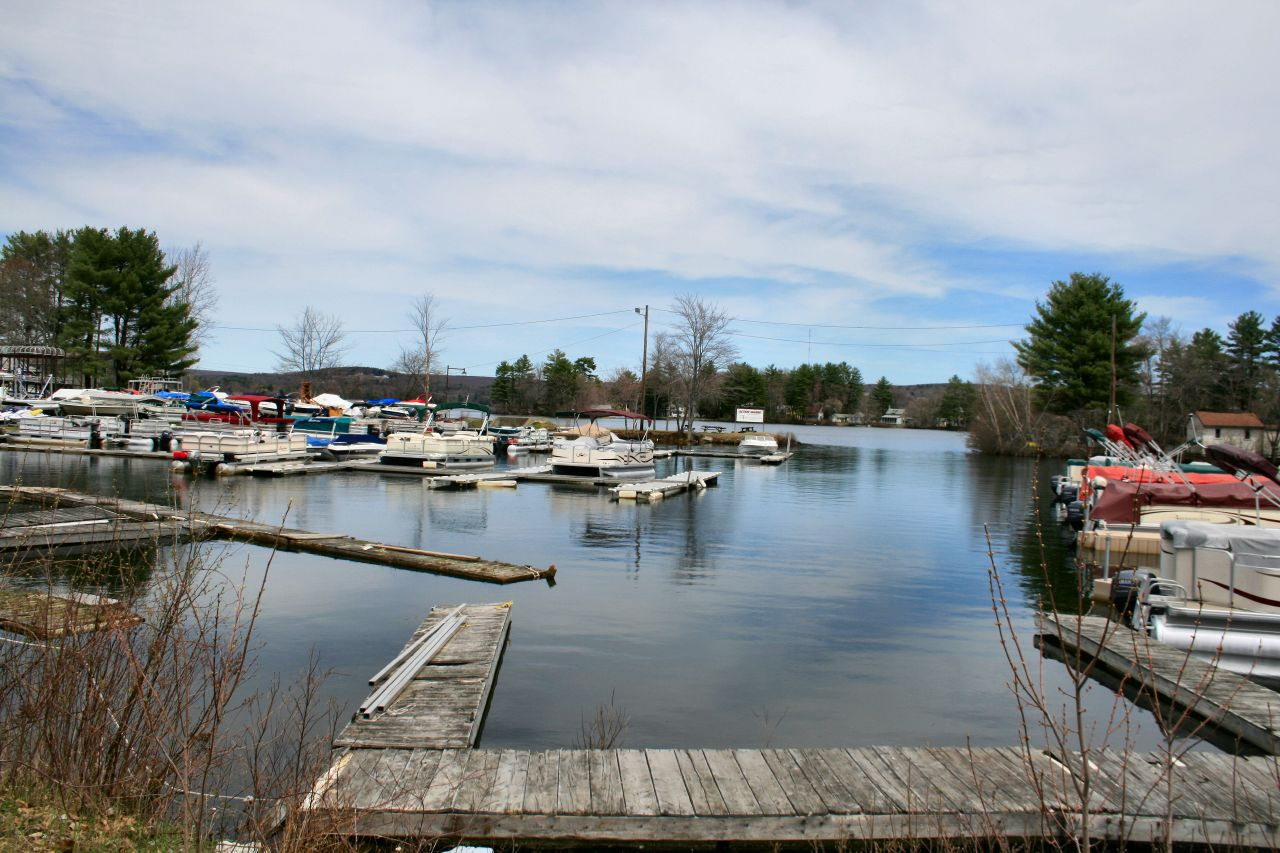
Modern shoreline of Webster Lake. The lake's shorter Indigenous name, Chaubunagungamaug, serves as the namesake of the tribe.

The Chaubunagungamaug Nipmuck prefer the spelling Nipmuck as opposed to Nipmuc. The term derives from nippamaug, "freshwater fishing pond." This has cognates in the closely related Massachusett language (with revived Wampanoag spelling in parentheses), such as the base nippa-/(nup-), 'freshwater,' and -âmaug/(-ômâk), 'fishing pond.'

Chaubunagungamaug, one of two official Indigenous names for Webster Lake which occupies much of the southern half of the town, signifies "divided fishing place" or "fishing place at the boundary," because the lake was once divided into exclusive fishing zones with the Nipmuck at the northern part of the lake living in a village also known as Chabunagungamag and a related Nipmuck group living at Monuhchogok (Manchaug) to the south of the lake. The lake's full name is Chargoggagoggmanchauggagoggchaubunaguhgamaugg and includes roots cognate to Massachusett [chad]chapun-/([cha]châpunum-), 'to divide,' and -âmaug/(-ômâk), 'fishing pond.' Eliot used a variant, Chabonakongkomun, for the Praying town established near the site of the old village and its inhabitants.

Throughout most of the 18th century, the Nipmuck of Chaubunagungamaug were commonly referred to as the Pegan Indians (not to be confused with Piegan Blackfoot) because of the prevalent nature of the surname Pegan amongst its members, many of whom had ancestral ties to Natick. It is found in local place names as pegan- or pahegan- meaning 'clear'—as in something cut down or thin to let light through, and by extension, 'bare,' 'barren,' or 'treeless.' It is cognate to Massachusett pohk-/(pâhk-), 'clear.'

English settlers, and later other immigrant groups, generally referred to the Nipmuck near the lake by the name of the location of the reservation. As Praying Indians, they were originally known as the Praying Indians of Chabanakongkomun. The reservation lands granted by Massachusetts were included in the town of Dudley, Massachusetts, and moved to a section of town later ceded and incorporated as the town of Webster, Massachusetts. As a result, they were known as the Dudley, Webster-Dudley, Dudley-Webster and Webster Indians.

In 1996, the group adopted the formal name Webster/Dudley Band of the Chaubunagungamaug Nipmuck Indians.

== Location ==
The Nipmuck homeland was referred to as Nippenet, 'freshwater (pond) place,' due to the large number of small ponds and lakes that dotted the region now covered by most of central Massachusetts and adjacent portions of north-eastern Connecticut and north-western Rhode Island. Within this region, the Chaubunagungamaug were concentrated in an area between Lake Chaubunagungamaug and the Maanexit River, corresponding to the towns of Dudley, Southbridge, Webster, Charlton, Oxford, Sutton, Douglas in southern Worcester County, Massachusetts and the town of Thompson in Windham County, Connecticut.

The principal village of Chaubunagungamaug was located north of the lake in what is now Webster. The reserve lands were dwindled away and later surrounded by the town of Dudley. The reservation lands were moved back to the area around the lake which was later split off and incorporated as the town of Webster, where a few acres remain in the tribe's use as the reservation.

== Group Membership ==
Membership in the Webster/Dudley Band of Chaubunagungamaug Nipmuck Indians is open to those who identify as lineal descendants of the "Dudley Indians" enumerated in the 1861 Report to the Governor and Council concerning the Indians of the Commonwealth (Earle Report) conducted by Indian Commissioner John Milton Earle or the 1890 Worcester Probate Court lists of beneficiaries to the funds from the reservation land sales. Surnames of Dudley Indians on the Earle Report of 1861 include Bakeman, Beaumont, Belden, Cady, Corbin, Daley, Dorus, Esau, Fiske, Freeman, Henry, Hull, Humphrey, Jaha, Kyle, Nichols, Oliver, Pegan, Robinson, Shelley, Sprague, White, Willard and Williard. In 2004, the group had 354 members.

In 2004, 277, or 53 percent, of the Nipmuck identifying with the Nipmuc Nation and listed in the Hassanamisco Nipmuc tribal rolls at the time were Chaubunagungamaug Nipmuck that remained after the 1996 exit of the Webster/Dudley Band, mostly from the Jaha, Humphrey, Belden, Pegan/Wilson, Pegan and Sprague families listed on the Earle Report. This also indicated that at that time, 43 percent of the total known population of descendants of the Dudley Indians, to which the Webster/Dudley Band are a successor, were not included in tribal rolls.

== Government ==
Since 1996, the group has its own elected council. The council is elected to serve three-year terms, with elections occurring at the end of December. As of November 2013, the council consists of Chairman/Treasurer Kenneth White, Vice-chairman David White, Secretary Sherry Davis, Enrollment Committee Chairperson Stacey Kelleher, Resident Agent Tom Morse, Claudia Zatorski, Barbi Gardiner, Charles T Morse Sr and Melissa Greene. Councilors are restricted to certain family lines, such as the Dorus/White, Sprague/Henries and Nichols/Heath branches.

Sachems since 1981

- Sachem Edwin Wise Owl Morse, Sr., 1981–2010.
- Sachem Edwin Red Fox Morse, Jr., 2010 - 2013.

== Relationship with other Nipmuc ==
Although relations between the Webster/Dudley Band of the Chaubunagungamaug Nipmuck and the Hassanamisco Nipmuc (including Nipmuc Nation Chaubunagungamaug Nipmuc) were formerly strained, the close kinship ties and shared cultural pursuits have helped to heal old wounds. The two tribes are currently working together to revive the Nipmuck language, and make use of land identified by the East Quabbin Land trust as a possible site for a Nipmuck cultural centre. Other Nipmuck groups, without state recognition, include the Connecticut Nipmuc, who claim to be descendants of Nipmuck from the Praying towns that were located in what is now Connecticut and Nipmuck that relocated there.

Nippamaug of all bands regularly attend the powwows, Indian fairs and social gatherings of the others. The Webster/Dudley Band of Nipmucs works with the Massachusetts Commission on Indian Affairs to provide support for Native peoples.

== Notable Chaubunagungamaug Nipmuck ==
=== Chiefs and Leaders ===
- Sachem Willymachin 'Black James,' 17th century Chief.
- Sachem James, son and heir of Willymachin and brother to Simon, 17th century Chief.
- Sachem Simon, son and heir of Willymachin and brother to James, 17th century Chief.
- Joseph, Teacher of the Praying Town of Chabanakongkomun, son of Hassanamisco Nipmuc Sachem Robin Petahvit, 17th century.
- Sachem Edwin Wise Owl Morse, Sr., Chief from 1981 to 2010.
- Sachem Edwin Red Fox Morse, Jr., Chief from 2010 to 2013.
- David Tall Pine White, Tribal councillor, spiritual and cultural leader, language instructor, language consultant/actor on We Shall Remain mini-series.

=== Veterans ===
- Joshua Ephraim, American Revolutionary War Veteran, 18th century.
- Eleazer Pegan, American Revolutionary War Veteran, 18th century.
- Josiah Pegan, American Revolutionary War Veteran, 18th century.
- Joseph Pegan, American Revolutionary War Veteran, Jr., 18th century.
- Josiah Pegun, American Revolutionary War Veteran, 18th century.
- Hezekiah Dorus, Civil War Veteran, 19th century.
- Joseph E. Bowman, Civil War Veteran, 19th century.
- William H. Cady, Civil War Veteran, 19th century.
- Joseph H. P. White, Civil War Veteran, 19th century.
- James M. Pegan, Civil War Veteran, 19th century.
- Theophilus D. Freeman, Civil War Veteran, 19th century.
- Israel Henries, World War I Veteran, 20th century.
- Earl Edward Henries, World War II draftee, 20th century.

=== 'Last of the Nipmucks' ===
The following gained notoriety as the so-called 'last of the' or 'last full-blooded' Nipmuck:

- Angela Lynch, née Sprague, d. 1914.
- Matilda Maria Henries (Matilda Henry), née Nichols, d. 1920.
- Henry E. Dorus, d. sometime after 1936.
- Payne Henries, d. sometime after 1930.

== See also ==
- Nipmuc people
- Nipmuc Nation
- Native American tribes in Massachusetts
