= Nipmuc =

Indigenous people in Massachusetts and adjoining states

Nipmuc Tribe
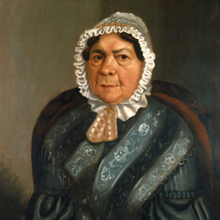
- Portrait of Hepsibeth Hemenway, a Nipmuc woman from Worcester, Massachusetts, 1830

Total population
- Contemporary people claiming Nipmuc descent: 354 Chaubunagungamaug, (2002); 526 Hassanamisco Nipmuc (2004). Possible total 1,400 (2008)

Regions with significant populations
- Central Massachusetts, northeast Connecticut, and northwest Rhode Island

Languages
- English, likely formerly Nipmuc and Massachusett

Religion
- Traditionally Animism (Manito), Christianity.

Related ethnic groups
- Narragansett, Shawomet, Eastern Niantic peoples

The Nipmuc or Nipmuck people are an Indigenous people of the Northeastern Woodlands, who historically spoke an Eastern Algonquian language, probably the Loup language. Their historic territory Nippenet, meaning 'the freshwater pond place', is in central Massachusetts and nearby parts of Connecticut and Rhode Island.

The Nipmuc Tribe had contact with traders and fishermen from Europe prior to the colonization of the Americas. The first recorded contact with Europeans was in 1630, when John Acquittamaug took maize to sell to the starving colonists of Boston, Massachusetts. After the colonists encroached on their land, and introduced legislation designed to encourage further European settlement, many Nipmucs joined Metacomet's war, known as King Philip's War, in 1675, though they were unable to defeat the colonists. Many Nipmuc were held captive on Deer Island in Boston Harbor and died of disease and malnutrition, while others were executed or sold into slavery in the West Indies.

Christian missionary John Eliot arrived in Boston in 1631. After learning the Massachusett language, which was widely understood throughout New England, he converted numerous Native Americans to Christianity, and with the help of Wawaus, also known as James the Printer, published a Bible translated in Massachusett and a Massachusett grammar. Backed by the colonial government, he established several "Indian plantations" or praying towns, where Native Americans were induced to settle and be instructed in European customs and converted to Christianity.

The state of Massachusetts has a diplomatic relationship with the Hassanamisco Nipmuc and the Chaubunagungamaug Band of Nipmuc Indians.

== Name ==
The tribe is first mentioned in a 1631 letter by Deputy Governor Thomas Dudley as the Nipnet, 'people of the freshwater pond', due to their inland location. This derives from Nippenet and includes variants such as Neipnett, Neepnet, Nepmet, Nibenet, Nopnat and Nipneet. In 1637, Roger Williams recorded the tribe as the Neepmuck, which derives from Nipamaug, 'people of the freshwater fishing place,' and also appears spelled as Neetmock, Notmook, Nippimook, Nipmaug, Nipmoog, Neepemut, Nepmet, Nepmock, Neepmuk, Nepmug, as well as modern Nipmuc(k). Colonists and the Native Americans themselves used this term extensively after the growth of the praying towns. The French referred to most New England Native Americans as Loup, meaning 'Wolf [people]'. But Nipmuc refugees who had fled to French Colonial Canada and settled among the Abenaki referred to themselves as ȣmiskanȣakȣiak, meaning the 'beaver tail-hill people'.

== Language ==
The Nipmuc most likely spoke Loup A, a Southern New England Algonquian language. The language is undergoing revival within the communities. There are several second-language speakers.

== Tribal divisions ==
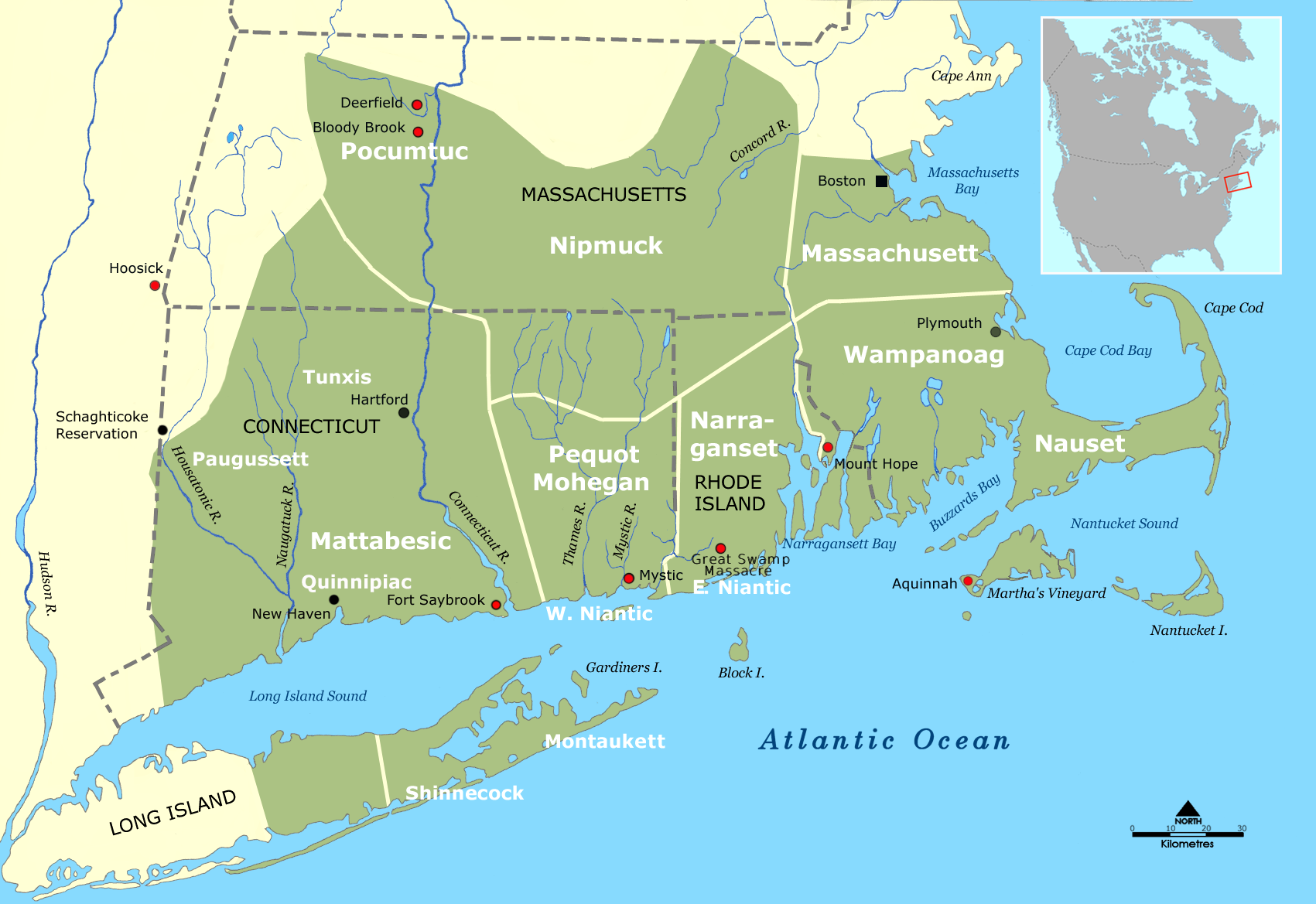
General location of the Nipmuc(k) and other tribes.

Daniel Gookin (1612–1687), Superintendent to the Native Americans and assistant of Eliot, was careful to distinguish the Nipmuc (proper), Wabquasset, Quaboag, and Nashaway tribes. The situation was fluid since these Native groups were decentralized, and individuals unhappy with their chiefs freely joined other groups. In addition, shifting alliances were made based on kinship, military, and tributary relationships with other tribes.

The formation of the praying towns dissolved some tribal divisions, as members of different tribes settled together. Four groups that are associated with the Nipmuc peoples survive today.

- Chaubunagungamaug Nipmuck, Dudley Indians

Descendants of the Praying town of Chaunbunagungamaug, now part of Webster, on lands returned by the town of Dudley, Massachusetts. The band uses a 2.5-acre parcel in Thompson, Connecticut, near the Webster town line.

- Hassanamisco Nipmuc Band, Grafton Indians

Descendants of the Praying town of Hassanamessit, now part of Grafton, Massachusetts. The reservation, about 3 acres, is the remainder of land reserved to the proprietary families in 1728; in 1861 one family still held "less than three acres" of it. The band describes the parcel as never having left Nipmuc hands.

- Natick Massachusett, Natick Nipmuc

The descendants of the praying town of Natick, Massachusetts do not retain any of their original lands. The Natick are primarily descended from the Massachusett in addition to having Nipmuc ancestry. They qualify for state services as Nipmuc.

- Connecticut Nipmuc

Descendants of various Nipmuc who survived or relocated to Connecticut. The Nipmuc of Connecticut are not recognized by the state. The related Quinebaug band, believed to have Algonquian origins, lived in both Connecticut and Massachusetts at the time of European contact. As of 1774, the last remaining Quinebaugs, numbering about 25 members, were recorded living near present-day Plainfield, Connecticut. Descendants of the Quinebaug are thought to be living in Nipmuc communities near Gay Head, Mashpee, and Worcester, Massachusetts.

== Legal status ==
=== State recognition ===
Massachusetts Governor Michael Dukakis issued Executive Order #126 in 1976, which proclaimed that 'State agencies shall deal directly with ... [the] Hassanamisco Nipmuc ... on matters affecting the Nipmuc Tribe'(much progress has happened since and other Nipmuck bands have been acknowledged by the state), as well as calling for the creation of a state 'Commission on Indian Affairs.' The all-Indian Commission was established; it conferred state support for education, health care, cultural continuity, and protection of remaining lands for the descendants of the Wampanoag, Nipmuc and Massachusett tribes. The state also calls for the examination of all human remains discovered in the course of construction and other projects, requiring notification of the Commission, who after the investigation by the State Archaeologist (in part in an effort to determine age of remains, decide the appropriate course of action.

The Commonwealth of Massachusetts also cited the continuity of the Nipmuc(k) with the historic tribe and commended tribal efforts to preserve their culture and traditions. The state also symbolically repealed the General Court Act of 1675 that banned Native Americans from the City of Boston during King Philip's War. The tribe also works closely with the state to undergo various archaeological excavations and preservation campaigns. The tribe, in conjunction with the National Congress of American Indians were against the construction of the sewage treatment plant on Deer Island in Boston Harbor where many graves were desecrated by its construction, and annually hold a remembrance service for members of the tribe lost over the winter during their internment during King Philip's War and protest against the destruction of Indian gravesites.

=== Federal recognition efforts ===
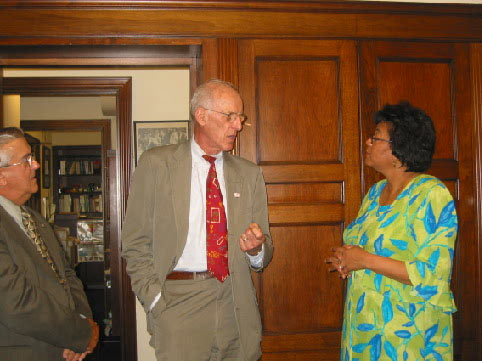
Congressman John Olver meets with a representative of the Nipmuc Nation during its bid for federal recognition.

On April 22, 1980, Zara Cisco Brough, a landowner of Hassanamessit, submitted a letter of intention to petition for federal recognition as a Native American tribe.

On July 20, 1984, the BIA received the petition letter from the 'Nipmuc Tribal Council Federal Recognition Committee', co-signed by Zara Cisco Brough and her successor, Walter A. Vickers, of the Hassanamisco, and Edwin 'Wise Owl' W. Morse Sr. of the Chaubunagungamaug. In January 2001, a preliminary finding was made by the BIA in favor of the Nipmuc Nation of Sutton, Massachusetts, which had most of its membership in Massachusetts, while a negative preliminary finding was issued for the Chaubunagungamaug Nipmuck Band of Dudley, Massachusetts, which had its membership about evenly split between Massachusetts and Connecticut. In 2004, the BIA notified the Nipmuc Nation that they had been rejected for federal recognition.

== Culture ==
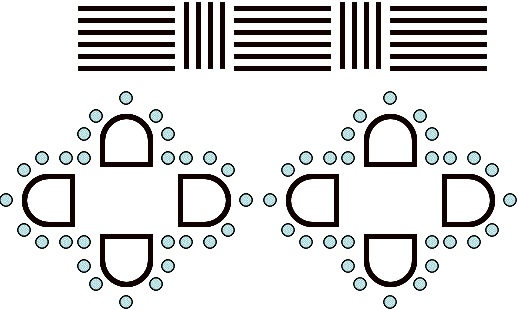
Designs such as these were painted or woven into Nipmuc baskets into the 1920s. The lines represent fields, while the domes represent wetus with dots representing people. Arranged in groups, it represents a village and its people.

As late as the 1920s, Nipmuc women in central Massachusetts, a people closely connected culturally and linguistically with the Massachusett-speaking peoples, still made traditional baskets that were often decorated with woven or painted symbols representing the local landscape, such as the use of domed figures for homes (wetus), dots for people, parallel and diagonal lines to represent plots of land and other symbols whose meaning are lost. It is unknown whether or not the basketry traditions represent a continuation or have any connection to the earlier petro- and dendroglyph traditions.

== Colonial-era history ==
=== 17th century ===
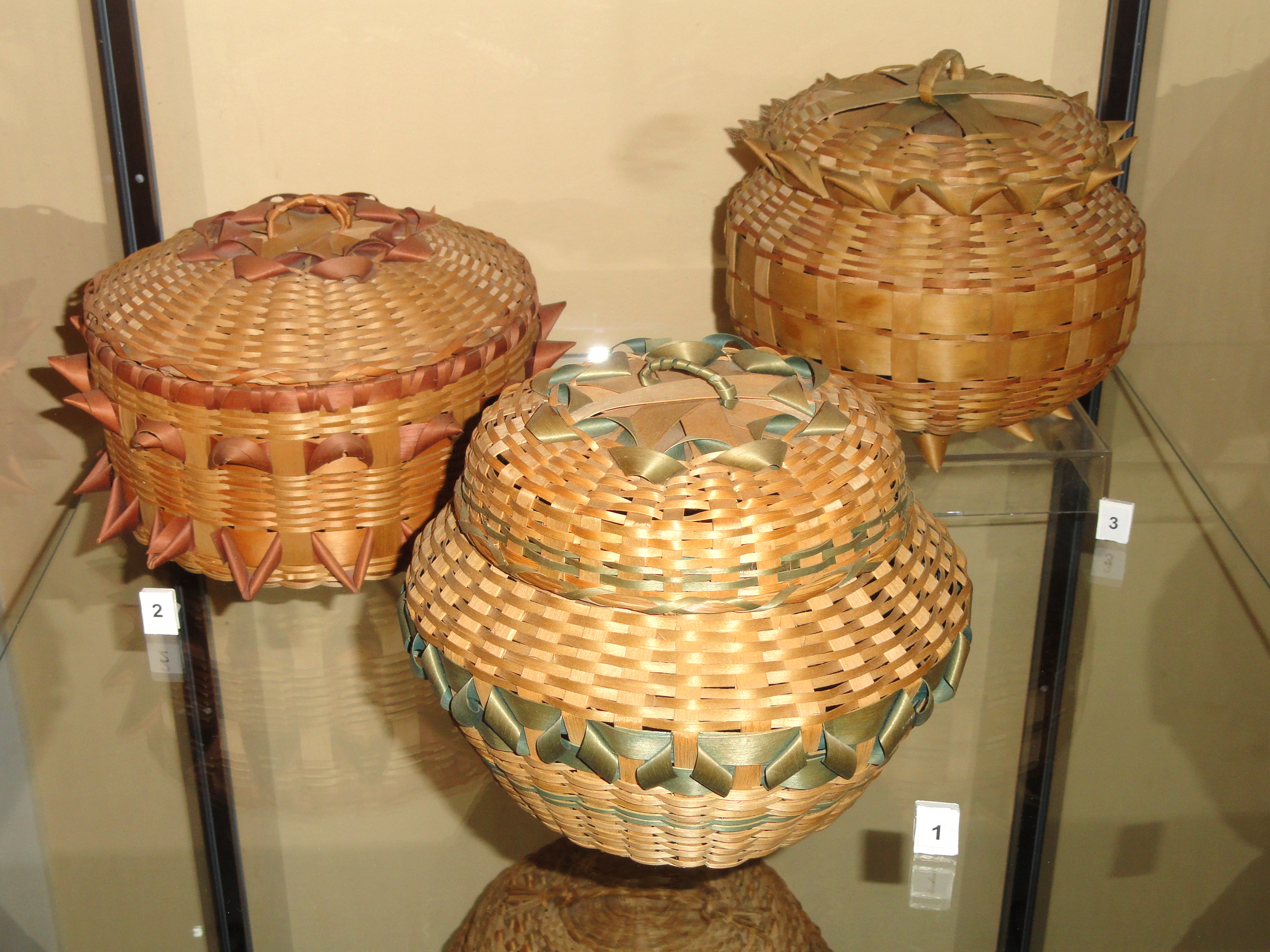
American Indian baskets at the Danforth Museum in Framingham, Massachusetts

European sailors, fishermen, and adventurers began visiting New England during the early modern period. The first permanent settlements in the region did not begin until after the settling of Plymouth Colony in 1620. These early seafarers introduced several infectious diseases to which the Native Americans had no prior exposure, resulting in epidemics with mortality rates as high as 90 percent. Smallpox killed many of the Native Americans in 1617–1619, 1633, 1648–1649, and 1666. Similarly influenza, typhus, and measles also afflicted the Native Americans throughout the period. In 2010 researchers developed a new hypothesis on epidemics between 1616 and 1619 as being from leptospirosis complicated by Weil syndrome.

As shown by the writings of Increase Mather, the colonists attributed the decimation of the Native Americans to God's providence in clearing the new lands for settlement, but they were accustomed to interpreting their lives in such religious terms. At the time of contact, the Nipmuc were a fairly large grouping, subject to more powerful neighbors who provided protection, especially against the Pequot, Mohawk and Abenaki tribes that raided the area.

The colonists initially depended on the Native Americans for survival in the New World, and the Native Americans rapidly began to trade their foodstuffs, furs and wampum for the copper kettles, arms and metal tools of the colonists. Puritan settlers arrived in large numbers from 1620 to 1640, the 'Great Migration' that increased their need to acquire more land. Since the colonists had conflicting colonial and royal grants, the settlers depended on having Indian names on land deeds to mark legitimacy. This process had serious flaws, as John Wompas deeded off many lands to the colonists to curry favor, many of which were not even his.

==== Indian plantations ====
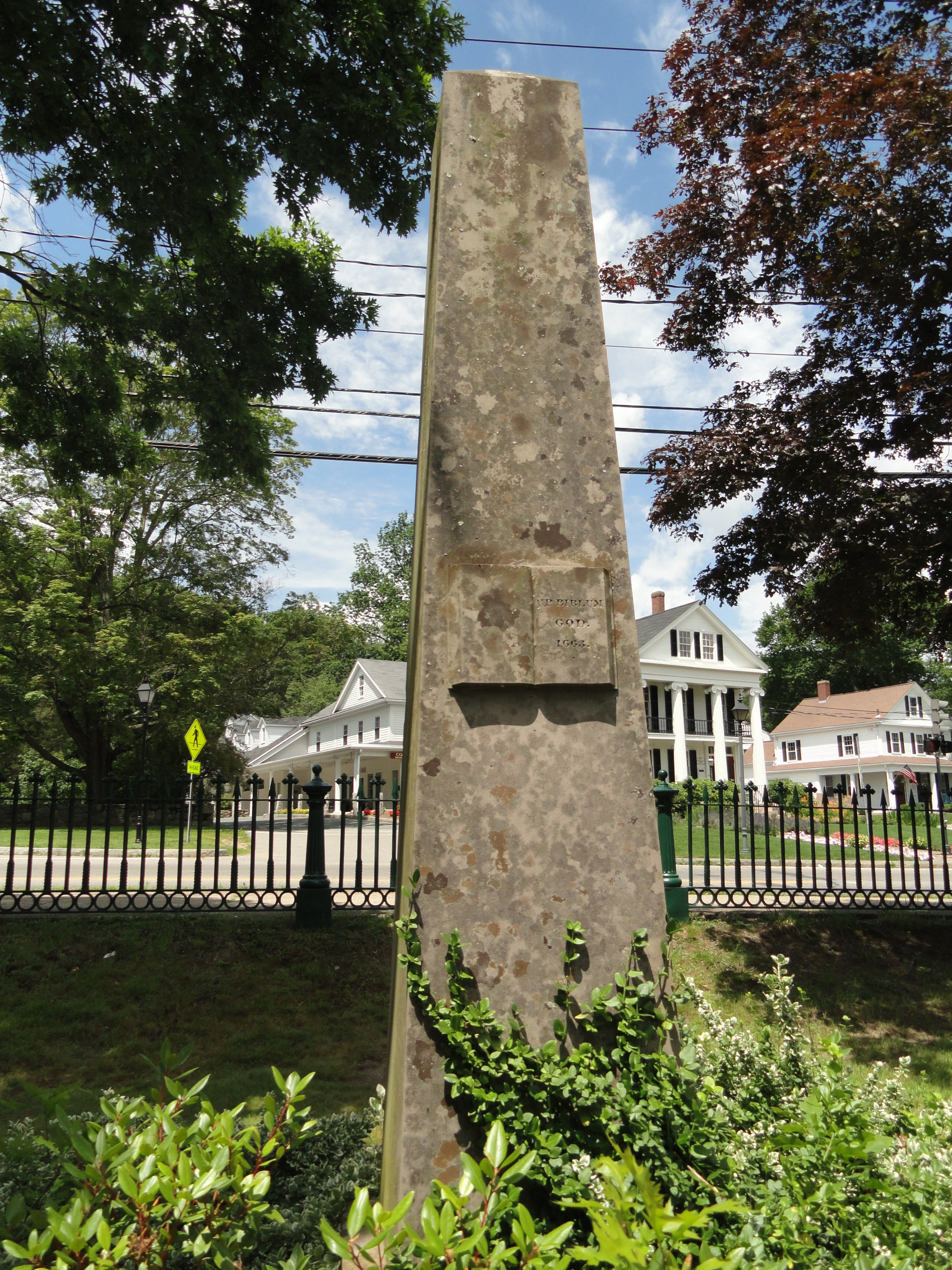
Monument to John Eliot in South Natick, site of the first Praying Plantation, or Praying town, in Massachusetts.

The royal charter of the Massachusetts Bay Colony of 1629 called for the conversion of Native Americans to Christianity. The colonists did not begin this work in earnest until after the Pequot War proved their military superiority, and they gained official backing in 1644.

Although many answered the call, the Rev. John Eliot, who had learned the Massachusett from tribe interpreters, compiled an Indian Bible and a grammar of the language. It was well understood from Cape Ann to Connecticut. In addition, colonial authorities supported settlement of the Native Americans on 'Indian plantations' or Praying towns. There they instructed the Native Americans in European farming methods, culture, and language, administered by Indian preachers and councilors who were often descended from the elite Native families. The Native Americans melded Indigenous and European culture, but were mistrusted by both the colonists and their non-converted brethren. The colonists and later state governments gradually sold off the plantations. By the end of the 19th century, only the Cisco homestead in Grafton was still owned by direct descendants of Nipmuc landholders.

Following is a list of Indian Plantations (Praying towns) associated with the Nipmuc:

Chaubunagungamaug, Chabanakongkomuk, Chaubunakongkomun, or Chaubunakongamaug

- 'The boundary fishing place,' 'fishing place at the boundary,' or 'at the boundary.'
- Webster, Massachusetts (on lands ceded from Dudley).

Hassanamesit, Hassannamessit, Hassanameset, or Hassanemasset

- 'Place where there is [much] gravel,' or 'at a place of small stones.'
- Grafton, Massachusetts.

Magunkaquog, Makunkokoag, Magunkahquog, Magunkook, Maggukaquog or Mawonkkomuk

- 'Place of great trees,' 'granted place,' or 'place that is a gift.'
- Hopkinton, Massachusetts.

Manchaug, Manchauge, Mauchage, Mauchaug, or Mônuhchogok

- 'Place of departure,' 'place of marvelling,' 'island of rushes,' or 'island where reeds grow.'(?)
- Sutton, Massachusetts.

Manexit, Maanexit, Mayanexit

- 'Where the road lies,' 'where we gather,' 'near the path,' or 'place of meekness.'
- Thompson, Connecticut.

Nashoba

- 'The place between' or 'between waters.'
- Littleton, Massachusetts.
- Also settled by the Pennacook.

Natick

- 'Place of hills.'
- Natick, Massachusetts.
- Also settled by the Massachusett.

Okommakamesitt, Agoganquameset, Ockoocangansett, Ogkoonhquonkames, Ognonikongquamesit, or Okkomkonimset

- 'Plowed field place' or 'at the plantation.'
- Marlborough, Massachusetts.

Packachoag, Packachoog, Packachaug, Pakachog, or Packachooge

- 'At the turning place,' 'bends,' 'bare mountain place, or 'treeless mountain.'
- Auburn, Massachusetts.

Quabaug, Quaboag, Squaboag

- 'Red pond,' 'bloody pond' or 'pond before.'
- Brookfield, Massachusetts.

Quinnetusset, Quanatusset, Quantiske, Quantisset, or Quatiske, Quattissick

- 'Long brook' or 'little long river.'
- Thompson, Connecticut.

Wabaquasset, Wabaquassit, Wabaquassuck, Wabasquassuck, Wabquisset or Wahbuquoshish

- 'Mats for covering a lodge,' 'place of white stones,' or 'mats to cover the house.'
- Woodstock, Connecticut.

Wacuntuc, Wacantuck, Wacumtaug, Wacumtung, Waentg, or Wayunkeke

- 'A bend in the river.'
- Uxbridge, Massachusetts. originally Mendon, Massachusetts sold by Nipmuck as "Squnshepauk" Plantation

Washacum or Washakim

- 'Surface of the sea.'
- Sterling, Massachusetts.
- Also settled by the Pennacook.

==== King Philip's War ====
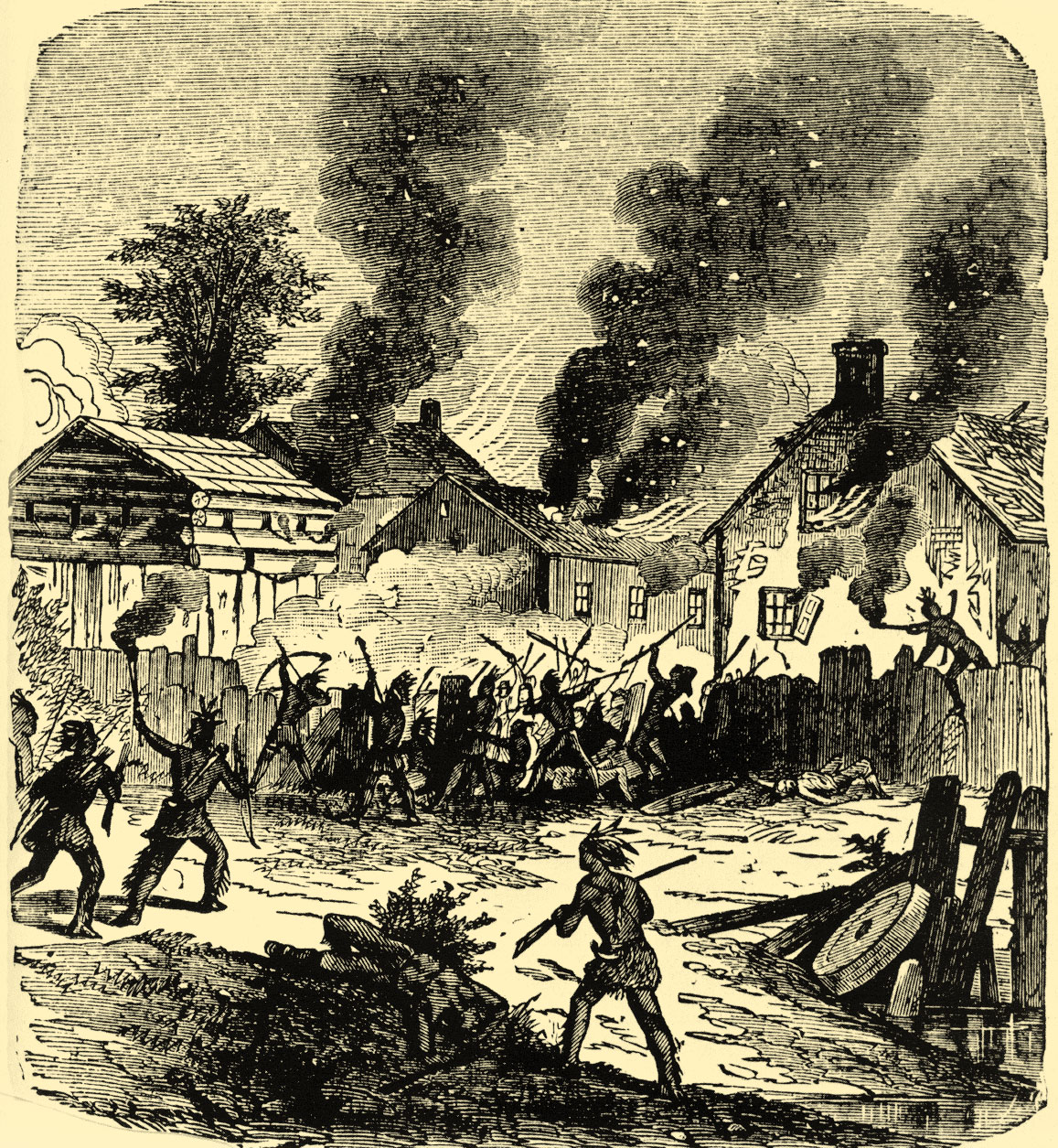
Depiction of the siege of Brookfield, Massachusetts during King Philip's War.

The Massachusetts Bay Colony passed numerous legislation against Indian culture and religion. New laws were passed to limit the influence of the powwows, or 'shamans', and restricted the ability of non-converted Native Americans to enter colonial towns on the Sabbath. The Nipmuc were also informed that any unimproved lands were fair game for incorporation into the growing colony.

Many Nipmuc objected to these changes and joined the Wampanoag chief Metacomet in his war against colonial expansion, known as King Philip's War, which would ravage New England from 1675 to 1676. The Native Americans that had already settled the Praying towns were interned on Deer Island in Boston Harbor over the winter where a great many perished from starvation and exposure to the elements. Although many of the Native Americans fled to join the uprising, other Native Americans joined the colonists. The Praying Indians were particularly at risk, as the war made all Native Americans suspect, but the Praying towns were also attacked by the 'wild' Native Americans that joined Metacomet's struggle. The Nipmuc were major participants in the siege of Lancaster, Brookfield, Sudbury and Bloody Brook, all in Massachusetts, and the tribe prepared thoroughly for conflict by forming alliances, and the group even had "an experienced gunsmith, a lame man, who kept their weapons in good working order." The siege of Lancaster also lead to the capture of Mary Rowlandson, who was placed in captivity until ransomed for £20 and would later write a memoir of her captivity. The Native Americans lost the war, and survivors were hunted down, murdered, sold into slavery in the West Indies or forced to leave the area.

=== 18th century ===
The Nipmuc regrouped around their former Praying towns and were able to maintain a certain amount of autonomy using the remaining lands to farm or sell timber. The population of the tribe was reduced as several outbreaks of smallpox returned in 1702, 1721, 1730, 1752, 1764, 1776, and 1792. Land sales continued unabated, much of it used to pay for legal fees, personal expenses, and improvements to the reserve lands. In 1727–28 the Hassanamesit proprietors sold about 7,500 acres, which became the town of Grafton, Massachusetts, reserving family allotments of about 500 acres. In 1797 the remaining 200 acres of the Chaubunagungamaug reserve were conveyed to Levi Davis to pay $300 in debts, and Davis deeded the Commonwealth a different tract of 26 acres, 58 rods for the band. The switch to the cattle industry also disrupted the native economy, as the colonists' cattle ate the unfenced lands of the Nipmuc and the courts did not always side with the Native Americans, but the Native Americans rapidly adopted the husbandry of swine since the changes in economy and loss of remaining pristine lands reduced ability to hunt and fish. Since the Native Americans had few assets besides land, much of the land was sold to pay for medical, legal and personal expenses, increasing the number of landless Native Americans. With smaller numbers and landholdings, Indian autonomy was worn away by the time of the Revolutionary War, the remaining reserve lands were overseen by colony- and later state-appointed guardians that were to act on the Native Americans' behalf. The Hassanamisco proprietary fund suffered repeated losses under its state-appointed trustees: a 1745 currency conversion, the unpaid personal debt of trustee Stephen Maynard, who became insolvent, and investments made without adequate security that were lost by 1841. Historian Daniel Mandell describes Maynard, appointed in 1776, as having embezzled funds without being prosecuted.

==== Wars ====
New England rapidly became swept up in a series of wars between the French and British and their respective Indian allies. Many of the Native Americans of New England who had left the region joined the Abenaki, who were allied to the French; however, local Native Americans were often conscripted as guides or scouts for the colonists. Wars occupied much of the century, including King William's War, (1689–1699), Queen Anne's War (1704–1713), Dummer's War (1722–1724), King George's War (1744–1748) and the French and Indian War (1754–1760). Many Native Americans also died in service of the Revolutionary War.

==== Emigration ====
The upheaval of the Indian Wars and growing mistrust of the Native Americans by the colonists lead to a steady trickle, and sometimes whole villages, that fled to increasingly mixed-tribe bands either northward to the Pennacook and Abenaki who were under the protection of the French or westward to join the Mahican at increasingly mixed settlements of Schagticoke or Stockbridge, the latter of which eventually migrated as far west as Wisconsin. This further dwindled Indian presence in New England, although not all the Native Americans dispersed. Those Nipmuc that fled eventually assimilated into either the predominant host tribe or the conglomerate that developed.

== Modern history ==
=== 19th century ===
The Native Americans were reduced to wards of the Commonwealth of Massachusetts and were represented by state-appointed non-Native guardians. Rapid acculturation and intermarriage led many to believe the Nipmuc had simply just vanished, due to a combination of romantic notions of who the Native Americans were and to justify the colonial expansion. Native Americans continued to exist but fewer and fewer were able to live on the dwindling reserve lands and most left to seek employment as domestics or servants in White households, out to sea as whalers or seafarers, or into the growing cities where they became labourers or barbers. Growing acculturation, intermarriage, and dwindling populations led to the extinction of the Natick Dialect of the Massachusett language, and only one speaker could be found in 1798. A cultural practice that survived was peddling handcrafted, square-edged splint baskets and medicines. The Commonwealth of Massachusetts, after investigating the condition of the Native Americans, decided to grant citizenship to the Native Americans with the passage of the Massachusetts Enfranchisement Act of 1869, which ultimately led to the sale of any of the remaining lands. Hassanamessit was divided up among a few families. In 1887, the last 26 acres of the Dudley lands were sold at auction, and five of the families were placed in a tenement house on Lake Street in Webster, Massachusetts. "The rest scattered, moving with other Nipmuc families living in Woodstock, Worcester, Providence, and Hassanamisco. Worcester developed strong Indian enclaves in mainly African-American neighborhoods. Nipmuc activities became centered on the Hassanamisco Reservation. Events such as the Annual Clambake and elections on the 4th of July were times for Nipmucs to gather and discuss tribal business."

==== Intermarriage ====
Intermarriage between Whites, Blacks (or Chikitis), and Native Americans began in early colonial times. Africans and Native Americans shared a complementary gender imbalance as slave-traders imported few female enslaved Africans into New England and many of Indian men died in war or joined the whaling industry. Many Native American women married African men. Intermarriage with whites was uncommon, due to colonial anti-miscegenation laws in place. The children of such unions were accepted into the tribe as Native Americans, due to the matrilineal focus of Nipmuc culture, but to the eyes of their sceptical White neighbours, the increasingly Black phenotypes of some were seen to delegitimize their Indian identity. By the 19th century, only a handful of pure-blood Native Americans remained, and Native Americans vanish from state and federal census records but are listed as 'Black', 'mulatto', 'colored' or 'miscellaneous' depending on their appearance. In 1902 it was reported that the Last of John Eliot Praying Indians was living in Massachusetts a Mrs Patience Fidelia Clifton age 70 of Brigham's Hill, Grafton, Massachusetts formerly Indian community of Hassanamesitt.

==== Censuses ====
In 1848, the Massachusetts Senate Joint Committee on Claims called for a report on the condition of several tribes that received aid from the Commonwealth. Three reports were listed: The 1848 'Denney Report' presented to the Senate the same year; the 1849 'Briggs Report', written by Commissioners F. W. Bird, Whiting Griswold and Cyrus Weekes and presented to Governor George N. Briggs; and the 1859 'Earle Report', written by Commissioner John Milton Earle that was submitted in 1861. Each report was more informative and thorough than the previous one. The Nipmuc require having an ancestor listed on these reports and the disbursement lists of funds from Nipmuc land sales. The lists did not count all Native Americans, as many Native Americans may have been well-integrated into other racial communities and due to the constant movement of Native Americans from place to place.

Massachusetts 'Indian Censuses'	Dudley Indians	Dudley Surnames	Grafton Indians	Grafton Surnames
1848, Denney Report	51		2	
1849, Briggs Report	46	Belden, Bowman, Daly, Freeman, Hall, Humphrey, Jaha, Kile (Kyle), Newton, Nichols, Pichens (Pegan), Robins, Shelby, Sprague and Willard.	26	Arnold, Cisco, Gimba (Gimby), Heeter (Hector) and Walker.
1861, Earle Report	77	Bakeman, Beaumont, Belden, Cady, Corbin, Daley, Dorus, Esau, Fiske, Freeman, Henry, Hull, Humphrey, Jaha, Kyle, Nichols, Oliver, Pegan, Robinson, Shelley, Sprague, White, Willard and Williard.	73	Arnold, Brown, Cisco, Gigger, Hazard, Hector, Hemenway, Howard, Johnson, Murdock, Stebbins, Walker and Wheeler.

- Some of the tribes' ancestors were recorded as 'colored' including individuals of the Brown, Cisco, Freeman, Gigger, Hemenway, Hull, Humphrey, Walker and Willard families.
- Some individuals of the Gigger family are labelled as 'miscellaneous Indians.'
- Some individuals were recorded as 'mixed' including individuals in the Bakeman, Belden, Brown, Kyle and Hector families.
- Some individuals of the Hall, Hector and Hemenway families have no label.

=== 20th and 21st centuries ===
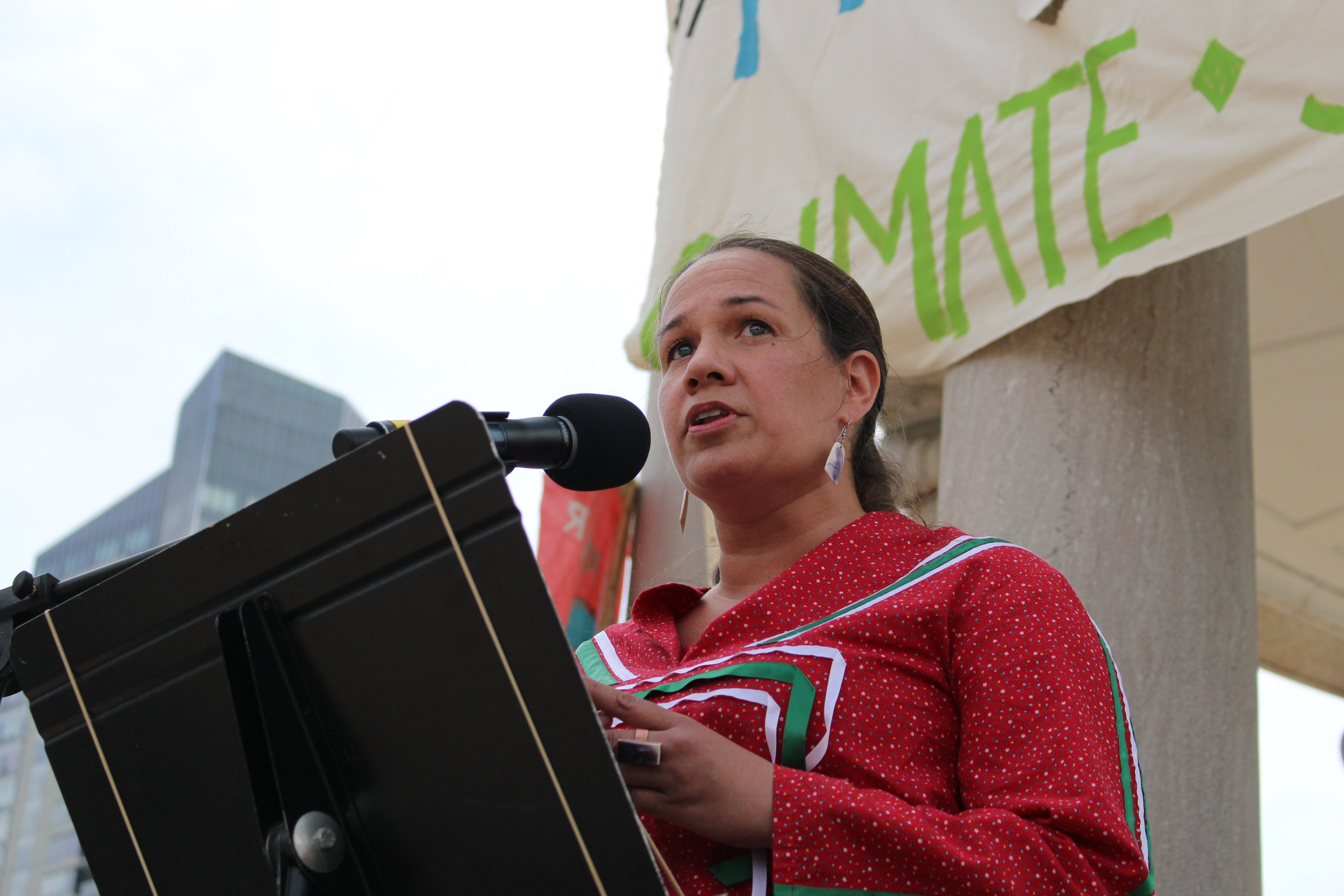
Kristen Wyman, member of the Natick Nipmuc Indian Council, an unrecognized tribe

Local attitudes towards Native American culture and history changed as antiquarians, anthropologists, institutions like the Boy Scouts as well as the 1907 appearance of Buffalo Bill Cody with many Native Americans in feathered headdresses paying respects to Uncas, Sachem of the Mohegan. Despite nearly four centuries of assimilation, acculturation, and the destruction of economic and community support from enfranchisement in the region, certain Indian families were able to maintain a distinct Indian identity and cultural identity. The turn of the century also saw active cultural and genealogical research by James L. Cisco and his daughter Sara Cisco Sullivan from the Grafton homestead, and worked closely with the remnants of other closely related tribes, such as Gladys Tantaquidgeon and the Fielding families of the Mohegan Tribe, Atwood L. Williams of the Pequot, and William L. Wilcox of the Narragansett. Together, various tribal members began sharing cultural memory, with pan-Indianism firmly taking root in the 1920s with Indian gatherings such as the Algonquin Indian Council of New England that met in Providence, Rhode Island and dances or powwows such as those at Hassanamessit in 1924. Plains Indian clothing was often worn as potent statements of Indian identity and to prove their continued residence in the area and because much of the original culture had been lost. Other Nipmuc individuals appeared at town pageants and fairs, including the 1938 appearance at the Sturbridge, Massachusetts bicentennial fair of many ancestors of today's Chaubunagungamaug Nipmuck.

By the 1970s, the Nipmuc had made many strides. Many local members of the tribe were called upon to help with the development of the Native American exhibit at Old Sturbridge Village, a 19th-century living museum built in the heart of former Nipmuc territory. State recognition was also achieved by the end of the same decade, re-establishing the Nipmuc people's relationship with the state and providing limited social services. The Nipmuc sought federal recognition in the 1980s. Tension between the Nipmuc Nation, which included the Hassanamisco and many descendants of the Chaubunagungamaug, based in Webster, Massachusetts split the application (69A&69B) in the mid-1990s. Divisions were caused by the frustrations with the slow pace of recognition as well as disagreements about gambling.

Land, 190 acres, in the Hassanamessit Woods in Grafton, believed to contain the remains of the praying village were under agreement for development for more than 100 homes. This property has significant cultural importance to the Hassanamisco Nipmuc because it contains the meetinghouse and the center of the old praying village. However, The Trust for Public Land, the town of Grafton, the Grafton Land Trust, the Hassanamisco Nipmuc and the state of Massachusetts intervened. The Trust for Public Land purchased the property and kept it off the market until 2004, after sufficient funding was procured to permanently protect the property. The property also has ecological significance as it is adjacent to 187 acres of Grafton owned land as well as 63 acres owned by the Grafton Land Trust. These properties will provide numerous recreational benefits to the public as well as play a role in protecting the water quality of local watersheds.

In July 2013, the Hassanamisco band selected a chief, Cheryll Toney Holley to succeed Walter Vickers upon his resignation.

In January 2025, 500 acres of land in present day Sunderland, Massachusetts was returned to the Hassanamisco Nipmuc.

== Notable Nipmuc people ==
- Cheryll Toney Holley, historian, museum director, and Sonksq (female chief) of the Hassanamisco Nipmuc Band from 2013 to 2021, when she stepped down from her position.
- Wullumahchein, also known as Black James (before 1640 – ca. 1686), Nipmuc peace office and spiritual leader

== See also ==
- Native American tribes in Massachusetts
- Hassanamisco Nipmuc
- Chaubunagungamaug Reservation
- Lake Chaubunagungamaug
- Tantiusques
