= Chaubunagungamaug Reservation =

- State Indian Reservation
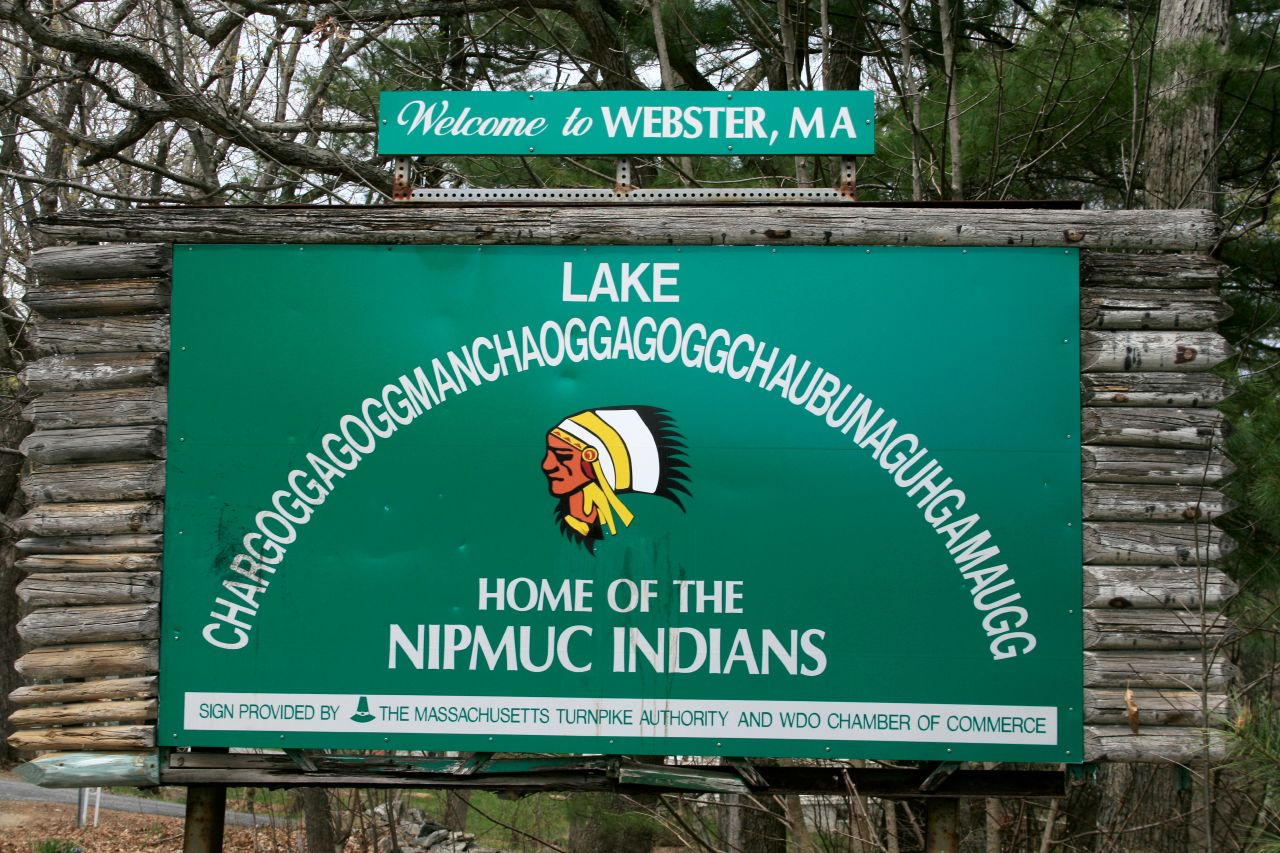
- Sign with the 14-syllable long form alternate name for Lake Chaubunagungamaug that also acknowledges the Nipmuck presence in the town.

- The Town of Webster, which contained the original reservation, within Worcester County and the Commonwealth of Massachusetts underneath the Town Seal.
- Coordinates: 42°01′27″N 71°52′38″W
- Country: United States
- State: Massachusetts
- County: Worcester
- Praying Town of Chabanakongkomun: 1674-1675
- Dudley Indian (Chaubunagungamaug) Reservation: c. 1682-1887
- Chaubungaungmaug Reservation: 1981–present

Government
  - Type: Council meeting, with members elected from certain family lines.
  - Sachem: None at this time

Area
  - Total: 2.5 acres (1.0 ha)
- Elevation: 505 ft (154 m)

Population (2010)
  - Total: 0
  - Density: 0.0/sq mi (0.0/km^{2})
- Time zone: UTC-5 (Eastern)
  - Summer (DST): UTC-4 (Eastern)
- ZIP code: 01570
- Area code: 508 / 774
- Website: Official CBNI Website

The Chaubunagungamaug Reservation refers to the small parcel of land located in the town of Thompson, Connecticut, close to the border with the town of Webster, Massachusetts, and within the bounds of Lake Chaubunagungamaug (Webster Lake) to the east and the French River to the west. The reservation is used by the descendants of the Nipmuck Indians of the previous reservation, c. 1682–1887, that existed in the same area, who now identify as the Webster/Dudley Band of the Chaubunagungamaug Nipmuck.

The reservation only consists of 2.5 acres (1.0 hectare), and does not support a permanent population. It does serve as a meeting place and cultural center for Webster/Dudley Band of the Chaubunagungamaug Nipmuck. The land is also used as a place for the reinterment of local Native American remains. The tribe, and its reservation, are recognized in Massachusetts, but both lack recognition in Connecticut and at the federal level.

== History ==
=== Praying Town of Chabanakongkomun ===
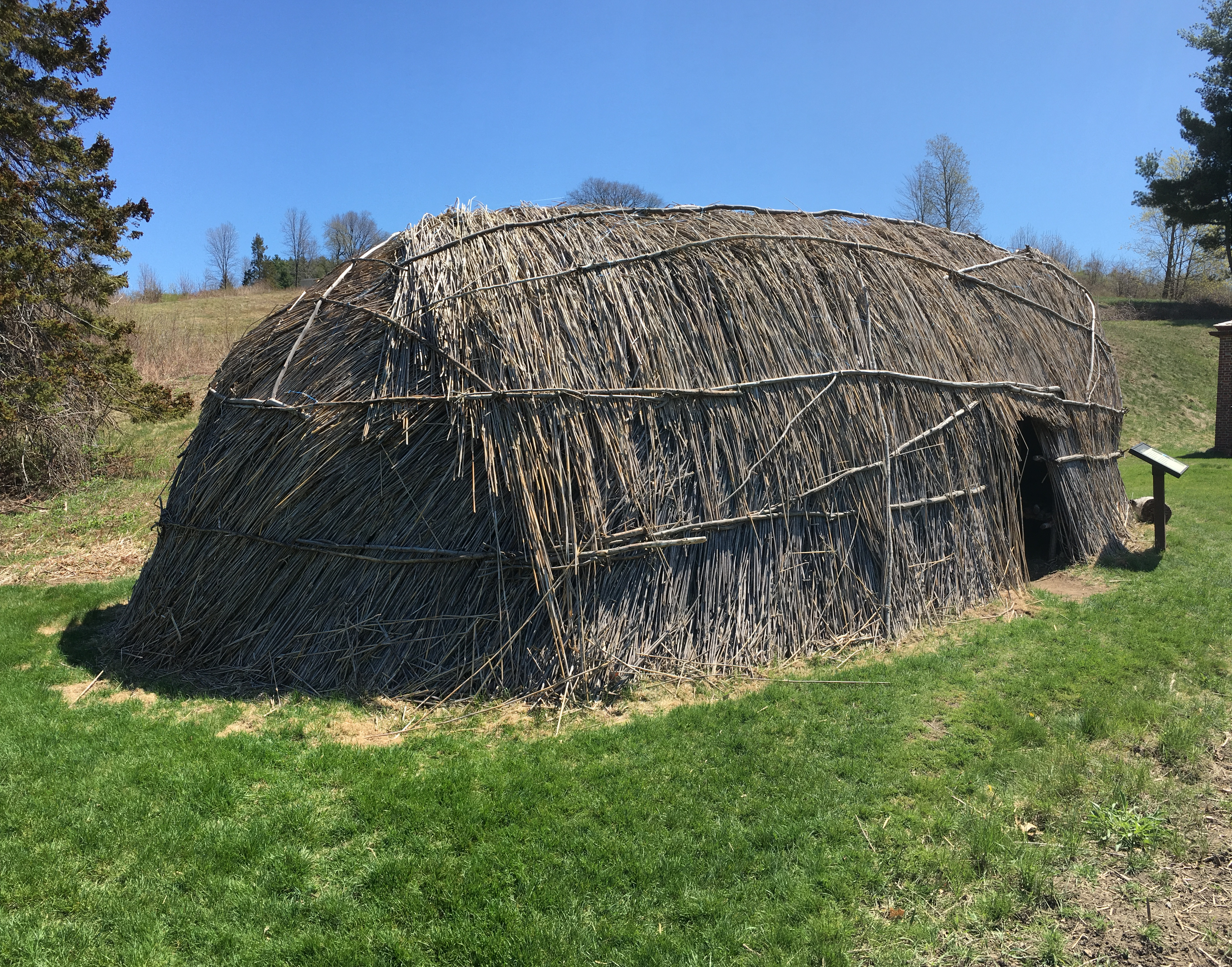
A recreation of a wetu at Fruitlands Museum in Harvard, Massachusetts. The Praying Indians faced restrictions aimed to assimilate them into English society and eliminate Indigenous religion, but they continued to maintain Native dwellings—such as the wetu, language, tribal hierarchy, and certain customs in the Praying Towns.

The first attempt at providing land for the Indians was the 'Praying towns' established by the missionary John Eliot, starting with Natick in 1651. Eliot petitioned the Great and General Court to provide land for the formation of townships, which the colonial government awarded in 1651, in response to the growing population of English settlers, which had doubled through natural increase and large-scale migration.

Eliot, who had already been instrumental in learning the language, translating the Bible, advocating for the Indians and teaching them literacy, settled Indian converts, known as 'Praying Indians,' in these communities. The Praying towns fell under colonial jurisdiction and laws, and the Praying Indians were forced to adopt many English customs, civil systems Christianity, but were self-governing with most administrative positions filled by the tribal elite, operated in their own language and were able to maintain Native customs.

In 1672, Joseph, son of the Hassanamessit (Grafton, Massachusetts) sachem Petavit (Petuhannit), also known as Robin, began preaching to the Indians of Chabanakongkomun, as Eliot referred to it. Eliot and Major-General Daniel Gookin, representing the colonial government, visited the area four times between 1668 and 1674. In 1673, Gookin installed Willymachin, also known as Black James, the sachem of Chabanakongkomun as Constable over four new Praying towns being established nearby. They returned in 1674, to officially recognize the Praying town with Joseph as its teacher. The new town did not receive an official land grant as it was still far from English settlements and due to the outbreak of King Philip's War 1675-1676 during Metacomet's uprising against the English. Chabanakongkomun was abandoned, as many fled to join Metacomet, others served the English as scouts and guides and those that remained were forcibly marched to Deer Island where many died of exposure, starvation and illness.

== See also ==
- Chaubunagungamaug Nipmuck
- Nipmuc
- Nipmuc Nation
- Native American tribes in Massachusetts
- State-recognized tribes
- List of Indian reservations in the United States
