= Hepsibeth Hemenway =

Nipmuc baker

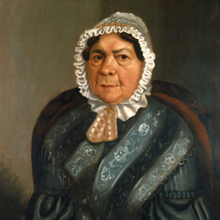
Hepsibeth Hemenway portrait by artist Henry Woodwand. In 1895 this portrait was displayed in the Worcester Historical Museum.

Hepsibeth Hemenway (March 25, 1763 - Feb. 17, 1847) was a Nipmuc Indian known particularly as a baker of wedding cakes for the wealthy in Worcester, Massachusetts. During her early years she struggled as a laundress and cook to support her family yet towards the end of her life she became quite successful. She is remembered today primarily by older families as a great cook and for having an excellent hand in making wedding cakes. Her portrait now hangs in the Worcester Historical Museum to remember her for her achievements.

== Family and life ==
On March 25, 1763, Lydia Bowman and Crosman became parents to their daughter Hepsibeth. Lydia was a Nipmuc Indian, and Crosman was a white man, making Hepsibeth a child of mixed race. Although Hepsibeth had both of her parents in her life on town records, she is listed primarily as the daughter of Lydia Bowman. This is due to the fact that it was illegal for an Indian woman and white man to be married at the time of her birth.

Hepsibeth was 21 years old when she lost both of her parents. Her father, Crosman, died in the Revolutionary War and a few months later, in 1784, her mother, Lydia, died a pauper. Having to support herself, Hepsibeth worked as a servant for judge Timothy Paine and his family. She worked for this family until 1789 when she met Revolutionary War veteran Jeffrey Hemenway.

In 1792, 29 year old Hepsibeth married Jeffrey Hemenway, a 53-year-old man of Indian and African-American descent. During their time as a married couple, they had eight children, six of whom survived to adulthood. In 1819, Jeffrey died, leaving Hepsibeth a widow at age fifty-six. Having to support her family by herself, Hepsibeth took in laundry, and also cooked and made wedding cakes.

== Wedding cakes ==
After the passing of her husband, Hepsibeth moved to a smaller home on Mechanic Street in Worcester near the Hope Cemetery. In her new home, she began to focus on her work as a laundress, cook, and baker of wedding cakes, for which she is most remembered. Although there is little information on where Hepsibeth learned her cooking and baking skills, it is assumed that she taught herself while working for the Paine family. With her position as a servant, she helped the Paine family by preparing food in their kitchen.

There is no surviving record to show exactly what Hepsibeth's famous cakes looked like, however they are explained to be different from modern cakes. One customer described her wedding cake in this way: “Its garb was purely white; Paradisiacal grains were scattered over its surface, & it was studded with gilded almonds. In the centre towered a beautiful collection of artificial flowers & round its body was a wreath of laurel.”

When Hepsibeth died in 1847, her daughter Hannah Hemenway continued her cake business. While a girl, Hannah assisted her mother when she made wedding cakes for her prominent customers. Hannah wanted to keep up the tradition because her mom, Hepsibeth, was well known in Worcester, and many people recommended her cakes to others for their wedding days. The hand-made cakes were always in demand, and for many years, Hannah followed in her mother's footsteps as a cake baker.

== Portrait ==
In the 1840s, artist Henry Woodward painted a portrait of Hepsibeth Hemenway. Woodward was introduced to Hepsibeth when he was sent to paint a picture of the Hope Cemetery. At the time, many were questioning if the space of the cemetery was being rightfully used. Some argued that the bodies needed to be moved because children needed space to play, while others disagreed. Since Hepsibeth lived so close to the Hope Cemetery, Woodward included the clothes line of laundry that was in Hepsibeth's yard in his painting.

Woodward was said to be intrigued by Hepsibeth and decided to paint a portrait of her. In the 1840s, it was rare for a woman of a mixed-race background to have a portrait painted. In the portrait, Hepsibeth wears elaborate clothing which are believed to be passed down from the upper class customers of her cake business. The portrait portrays what looks to be a middle to upper-class woman of Native American descent. In 1895, the portrait of Hepsibeth Hemenway became a part of the Worcester Historical Museum located in Worcester, where she was well known.
