= Hassanamisco Nipmuc =

State-recognized tribe in Massachusetts

The Hassanamisco Nipmuc Band is a state-recognized tribe in the Commonwealth of Massachusetts. They were recognized in 1976 by Governor Michael Dukakis via Executive Order 126. They were briefly known as the Nipmuc Nation, a union of the Hassanamisco Nipmuc and the Chaubunagungamaug Nipmuck bands, during their attempt to receive federal acknowledgment as a Nation. The Hassanamisco Nipmuc Band owns 3.5 acres (1.4 ha) of reservation land in what is present day Grafton, Massachusetts. The Nipmuc are native to Central Massachusetts, Northeastern Connecticut, and parts of Rhode Island.

Hassanamesit became one of the "praying towns" of the Puritan missionary John Eliot; on May 15, 1654, the Massachusetts General Court gave its inhabitants, with those of Nashoba and Okommakamesit, liberty to form towns. Through the creation and usage of this town, the Nipmuc people were forcefully converted to Christianity. In 1727, a Nipmuc woman, Sarah Robins took possession of the land that is currently referred to as the Hassanamisco Reservation. In the mid-1600s intermarriages between the Nipmuc people and African Americans became common, whether it be because of bonding over shared marginalization, or because of the dwindling numbers of available Native American men.

The Hassanamisco Reservation and Cisco Homestead in Grafton, Massachusetts are owned and used by the Nipmuc people. In 2011, the reservation and homestead were placed on the National Register of Historic Places.

In 1980, the Hassanamisco Nipmuc Band petitioned for federal recognition. They received preliminary approval before being ultimately denied.

== History ==
The Nipmuc people, also referred to as "freshwater people," were divided into many villages which were connected through alliances and trade. They once had a vast amount of land and were spread throughout what is now eastern to central Massachusetts and parts of Rhode Island and Connecticut. The people hunted, gathered, and planted food. The women of the tribe were in charge of farming, producing, and preparing food for their families and were the ones who passed down cultural knowledge from generation to generation. Since the wetus that they lived in could be moved, they were seen as "wanderers." They took great care of the land on which they lived.

Not much is known about the Nipmuc people before the invasion of European settlers. The earliest encounter known was in 1621, when the Native Americans were friendly with the settlers.

In the mid-1600s, Hassanemesit was one of more than a dozen Praying Towns established by the Massachusetts Bay Colony and Society for the Propagation of the Gospel in New England as permanent, European-style settlements for Christianized "praying Indians" in concerted efforts to commit cultural genocide and convert Eastern Algonquians to Christianity. In November, 1675, during King Philip's War, the praying Indians of Hassanemesit were presented with an ultimatum by surrounding Nipmuc to join them in the war against the colonists, and the town was depopulated for the duration of the war.

The Hassanamisco Nipmuc trace their descent to the seven proprietary families named when the Hassanamesit lands were sold in 1727–28. The Hassanamisco land was stolen by settlers without consent. Accounts of how much land the proprietors kept differ: the National Park Service gives 1,200 acres (490 ha), as does the Fiske Center's 2015 archaeological report, which counts a further 100 acres for general Native use; the 2004 federal acknowledgment review describes 500 acres reserved by the proprietors when they sold the other 7,500. That land began to dwindle as some Hassanmesit Nipmuc people started to sell or lease their land to encroaching settlers. From the 1720s to the 1740s, the Colony of Massachusetts put unassailable pressure on the Hassanamesit Nipmuc to sell their land and enter the market economy. However, this was often a tactic used on Native Americans so that they would get trapped into debt and then the settlers could claim their land as payment. The Hassanmesit Nipmuc fell victim to this practice and lost some communal land. Their land continued to be sold in pieces until 1857 when Moses Printer sold his land to Harry Arnold. The remaining 3.5 acres (1.4 ha) were retained by the Nipmuc Cisco family, and are currently known as the Hassanamisco Reservation.

Sarah Robins was a member of one of the original seven Nipmuc families. Sarah took possession of the land in 1727 and began a tradition of female land inheritance that lasted for hundreds of years. The female members of the Cisco family took control over the land in the late nineteenth century. These women became the caretakers of the land, working to ensure its preservation. After 1857, Sarah Arnold Cisco's land became the last original piece of Nipmuc land dating back to before the 1600s, after her uncle John Hector sold his land so he could live with other Native people and take advantage of opportunities in Worcester. Sarah Cisco decided that she would stay on her land and fight for it.

In the early 2000s, there was excavation work done at the Hassanamisco Reservation to find the remains of Sarah Boston's farmstead. Sarah Boston was the great-granddaughter of Sarah Robins. This site was the original land through which Sarah Robins started the tradition of female inheritance. Through this excavation, it was learned that the farmstead relied on the breeding and cultivation of animals for meat. It was also learned how she and others prepared food, what was eaten and how they procured it. The excavations, carried out between 2003 and 2013 by the University of Massachusetts Boston's Fiske Center with Nipmuc collaborators, found quartz and quartzite stone tools in use in the household alongside 18th- and 19th-century ceramics, evidence that the family continued traditional stone-tool practices.

=== Proprietary fund ===
The sale price of £2,500 was placed with trustees appointed by the General Court, who were to invest it as a permanent fund and pay the interest to the Native proprietors. In February 1744 the proprietors complained that they had gone two years without their interest; the Court appointed new trustees and ordered the former trustees to hand over the fund's books, bonds and money. In 1745 the trustees exchanged the fund's bonds at 28s. 8d. old tenor per ounce of silver, a conversion that state commissioner John Milton Earle later calculated cost the fund $1,330.89. A legislative committee that reviewed the trustees' accounts in 1788 found they had done "as well in all respects, by the said Indians, as the nature of the matter would admit of." Earle's 1861 report found that between 1772 and 1796 the trustees allowed one of their own, Stephen Maynard, to borrow from the fund on his personal obligation; Maynard became insolvent and the debt of $1,327.49 was never repaid. Notes worth $1,220.76 in 1841 were never accounted for, which Earle attributed to "great neglect of duty on the part of the trustees" in investing without adequate security. He concluded that the state "took their property into its keeping, and has suffered it to be squandered and lost."

=== Conversion to Christianity ===
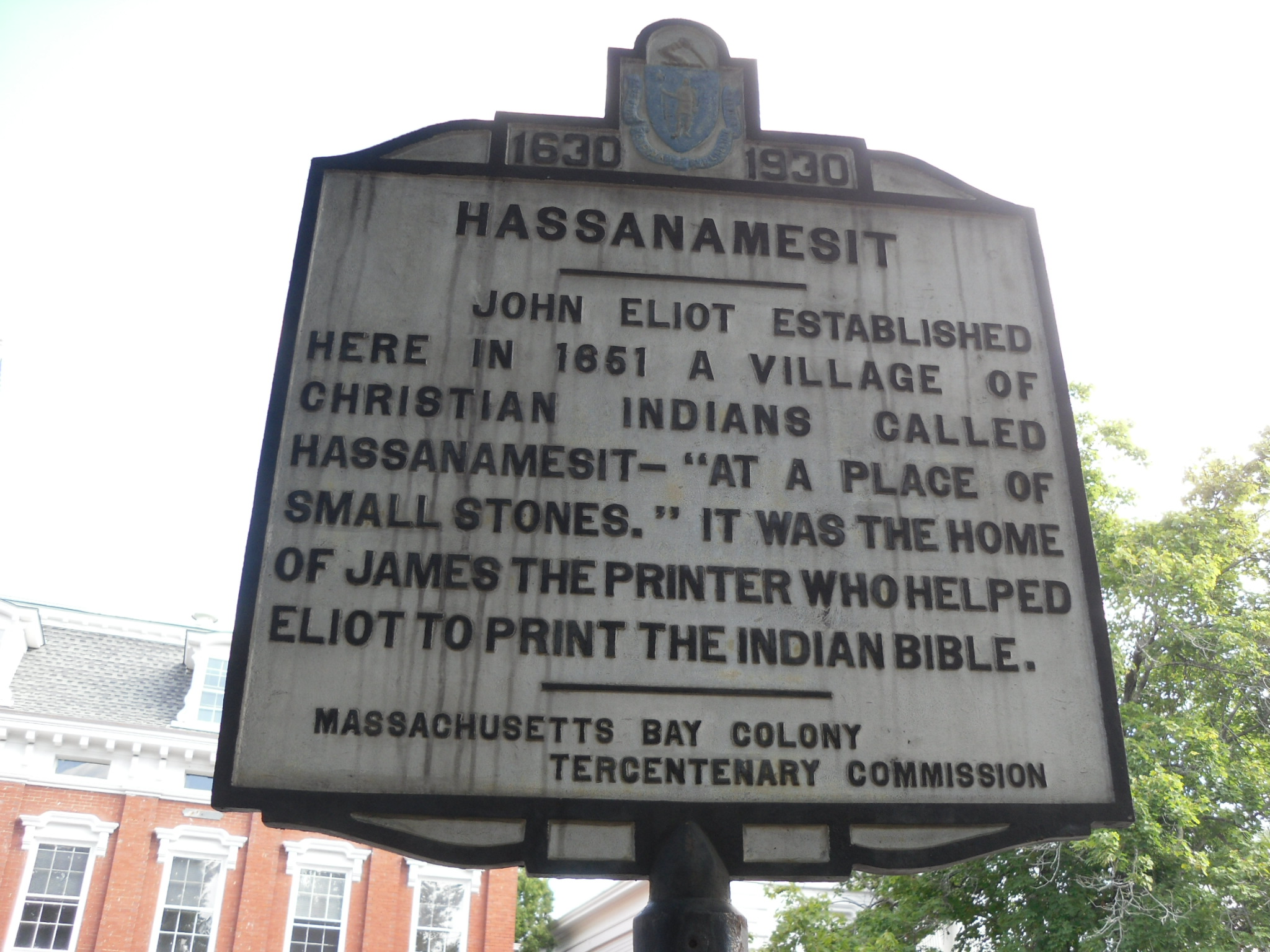
Hassanamesit historical marker

In the seventeenth century, a Protestant missionary by the name of John Eliot spoke in Northeastern Connecticut in an attempt to convert the local Native Americans to Christianity. On Nipmuc land and territory, Eliot created seven "praying towns. The present day Hassanamisco Reservation in Grafton, Massachusetts lies within the former praying town of Hassanamesit, which the General Court allowed to form a town in 1654. Hassanamesit was already an established community when Eliot arrived, so he illegally claimed it in order to enslave the people already living there to the settlers and their religion. These towns had the backing of the Massachusetts government at the time to effectively enact cultural genocide. Eliot believed that the Indigenous people not only needed to learn the Gospel, but, erroneously, to also adopt European ways of living. While living in these towns, the Native inhabitants were not allowed to practice any of their traditions. To enforce this way of living, the "Praying Indians" of the towns were given eight rules they needed to follow. If they did not, were forced to pay a fine, killed or sold into slavery. These rules included restrictions of what one's hair might look like; men were told they could not have long hair and women were required to have their hair pulled back. This was done in an effort to culturally assimilate the Nipmuc; as a part of Eliot's efforts to force the Nipmuc people to Christianity and to make them more "civilized," he forced the people in Hassanamesit to raise livestock. A superintendent at the time, Daniel Gookin, praised the Hassanmesit town for their ability to raise livestock. He stated that their way of keeping cattle and pigs was "better than any other Indians." The praying towns in Northeastern Connecticut were shut down after the beginning of King Phillip's war because the residents were forced to relocate to other towns.

=== King Phillip's War ===
Metacom, also known as King Phillip, recruited many different Native American tribes in New England to fight with him in his conflict with the colonists. Thousands of Native Americans were killed in this war, including members of the Nipmuc tribe. During the war, the Nipmuc, along with several other tribes, attacked Brookfield and set fire to Springfield, Massachusetts. In August 1675, the members of Hassanamesit praying town, along with four other towns, were held prisoner and banned from leaving the settlement under threat of imprisonment or death. In October of the same year, non-combatant Nipmuc were confined to Deer Island, in Boston harbor, for the winter, where more than half died from exposure and starvation. At the end of the war, the Nipmuc tribal members who had joined King Phillip that did not manage to escape were either killed or sold into slavery in the West Indies.

=== Denied Petition for Federal Acknowledgment ===
In 1980, the Nipmuc Nation - Hassanamisco Band petitioned for federal acknowledgment. On June 18, 2004, the Assistant Secretary - Indian Affairs issued a negative final determination due to the group's failure to meet four of the seven mandatory criteria for federal acknowledgment, including criterion 83.7(e) "descent from a historic Indian tribe."

The Branch of Acknowledgment and Research, Bureau of Indian Affairs determined that only 2% of the group's membership descended from the historic Hassanamisco at the time of the final determination, 53% (277 of 526) were found to descend from six families identified as Dudley/Webster Nipmuc, and the largest single family line, 34% of the membership, was found to descend from a "Miscellaneous Indian" on the 1861 Earle Report. The tribal affiliation of this "Miscellaneous Indian", who received the label "miscellaneous" because of her dual tribal affiliations, is known to be Dudley/Webster Nipmuc and Narragansett. The Hassanamisco Nipmuc have noted that the 1861 Earle Report was biased against their ancestors because they were mixed-race.

The Nipmuc Nation - Hassanamisco Band failed to meet criterion 83.7(a), which requires that "the petitioner has been identified as an American Indian entity on a substantially continuous basis since 1900." The final determination found that the Hassanamisco Nipmuc Nation was not identified externally as an American Indian entity on a substantially continuous basis between 1900 and 1970. The Branch of Acknowledgment and Research wrote, "The evidence submitted for the [Proposed Finding] and [Final Determination] does not include substantially continuous external identifications of a Hassanamisco Nipmuc entity broader than the Hassanamisco proprietary descendants for the period 1900-1970. An external identification of the narrower Hassanamisco entity is not the same as an external identification of the current petitioner, which is substantially different from the entity that was being identified, the Hassanamisco descendants constituting 11 of the petitioner's 526 members."

The Nipmuc Nation - Hassanamisco Band failed to meet criterion 83.7(b), which requires that "A predominant portion of the petitioning group comprises a distinct community and has existed as a community from historical times until the present." The Branch of Acknowledgement and Research determined that the members of the Hassanamisco Nipmuc Nation had no extended social or political interaction with each other prior to 1978. They wrote, "The evidence in the record shows no written social interaction between the Hassanamisco Nipmuc and the [Dudley/Webster] Nipmuc families between the 1730's and the 1920's -- a period of nearly two centuries. From the 1920's through the 1970's, the evidence in the record showed occasional social interaction between Hassanamisco descendants and [Dudley Webster] descendants, most frequently in the context of pan-Indian or intertribal activities...On the basis of precedent, this type of limited interaction is not sufficient in scope to establish a community under 83.7(b) during any time period."

During the federal acknowledgement process, the Branch of Acknowledgment and Research also determined that the historic Hassanamisco tribal entity ceased to exist in the 18th century, writing, "There is sufficient evidence that the historical Hassanamisco Band retained community from colonial times until the period of the American Revolution, as a majority of its population lived on the reservation in Grafton, Massachusetts. From the American Revolution until the mid-19th century, there is limited written evidence concerning continuing social ties among the Hassanamisco proprietary families. From the mid-19th century to the present, most of the evidence in the record pertains only to the Cisco extended family, and demonstrates only occasional social interaction between the Ciscos and the descendants of the other Hassanamisco proprietary families." A title search for their reservation in Grafton, Massachusetts, revealed that the reservation was the private property of the Cisco family, and not held in trust as communal Nipmuc land. This - along with the lack of political influence or authority shown by the Hassanamisco Nipmuc Nation from 1978 onwards - caused them to fail criterion 83.7(c), which requires that "The petitioner has maintained political influence or authority over its members as an autonomous entity from historical times until the present."

== Current status ==
Location of the Hassanamisco Reservation

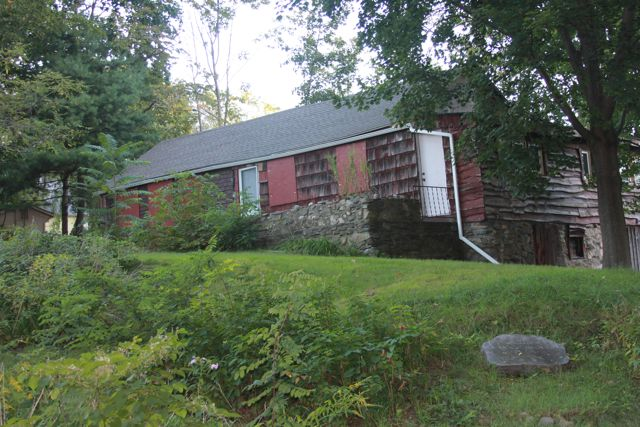
Building on the Hassanamisco Reservation, which is listed on the National Register of Historic Places

Today, the Hassanamisco Nipmuc Band has over 2300 members. They are a state-recognized Tribe and maintain a government-to-government relationship with the state of Massachusetts. In 1980, the Hassanamisco Nipmuc Nation filed a petition with the Bureau of Indian Affairs to gain federal recognition; they received preliminary approval but were ultimately denied.In January 2025, 500 acres of land in present day Sunderland, Massachusetts was returned to the Hassanamisco Nipmuc.

=== Cisco Homestead ===
The Cisco Homestead is the central building of the Hassanamisco Reservation and is currently being restored by members of the tribe. Approximately 150 years ago the building was named after the Cisco family, but it had been standing long before it had received its name, having been built in 1801. It is thought that the Cisco Homestead is the oldest timber-framed building that is still used by Native Americans to this day.

== See also ==
- Native American tribes in Massachusetts
- Chaubunagungamaug Reservation
- State-recognized tribes in the United States
- List of Indian reservations in the United States
- National Register of Historic Places listings in Worcester County, Massachusetts
- King Phillip's War
- Praying Towns
