= Loup languages =

Extinct Algonquin language of New England

Loup
- Nipmuck
- Pronunciation: [lu] loo
- Native to: United States
- Region: Massachusetts, Connecticut
- Ethnicity: Nipmuck
- Extinct: 18th century
- Language family: Algic: Algonquian; Eastern Algonquian; Loup
- Writing system: transcribed with Latin script

Language codes
- ISO 639-3: Either: xlo – Loup A xlb – Loup B
- Glottolog: loup1243 Nipmuck loup1245 Loup B

Loup is a term which refers to the Algonquian language varieties spoken in colonial New England as attested in the manuscripts of mid-eighteenth century French missionaries. Loup A was attested in a notebook titled Mots loups (literally translating to 'wolf words'), compiled by Jean-Claude Mathevet, a priest who worked among Algonquian peoples, composing of 124 pages. Loup ('Wolf') was a French colonial ethnographic term, and usage was inconsistent. In modern literature, Loup A refers to the varieties described by Mathevet, and Loup B refers to those described by François-Auguste Magon de Terlaye.

== Classification ==
Linguist Ives Goddard identified three distinct language varieties each attested in the Loup A and Loup B manuscripts. The languages of Loup A are referred to as Loup 1, Loup 2, and Loup 3; the languages of Loup B are referred to as Loup 4, Loup 5, and Loup 6. According to Goddard, Loup 3 and Loup 4 are the same language.

On the basis of morphophonological comparisons with other Algonquian languages and ethnogeographic context, Goddard identifies the five Loup languages with particular bands of the Pocumtuck Confederacy:

- Nipmuck (Loup 1)
- Norwottuck (Loup 2)
- Pocumtuck (Loup 3 and 4)
- Woronoco (Loup 5)
- Pojassick (Loup 6)

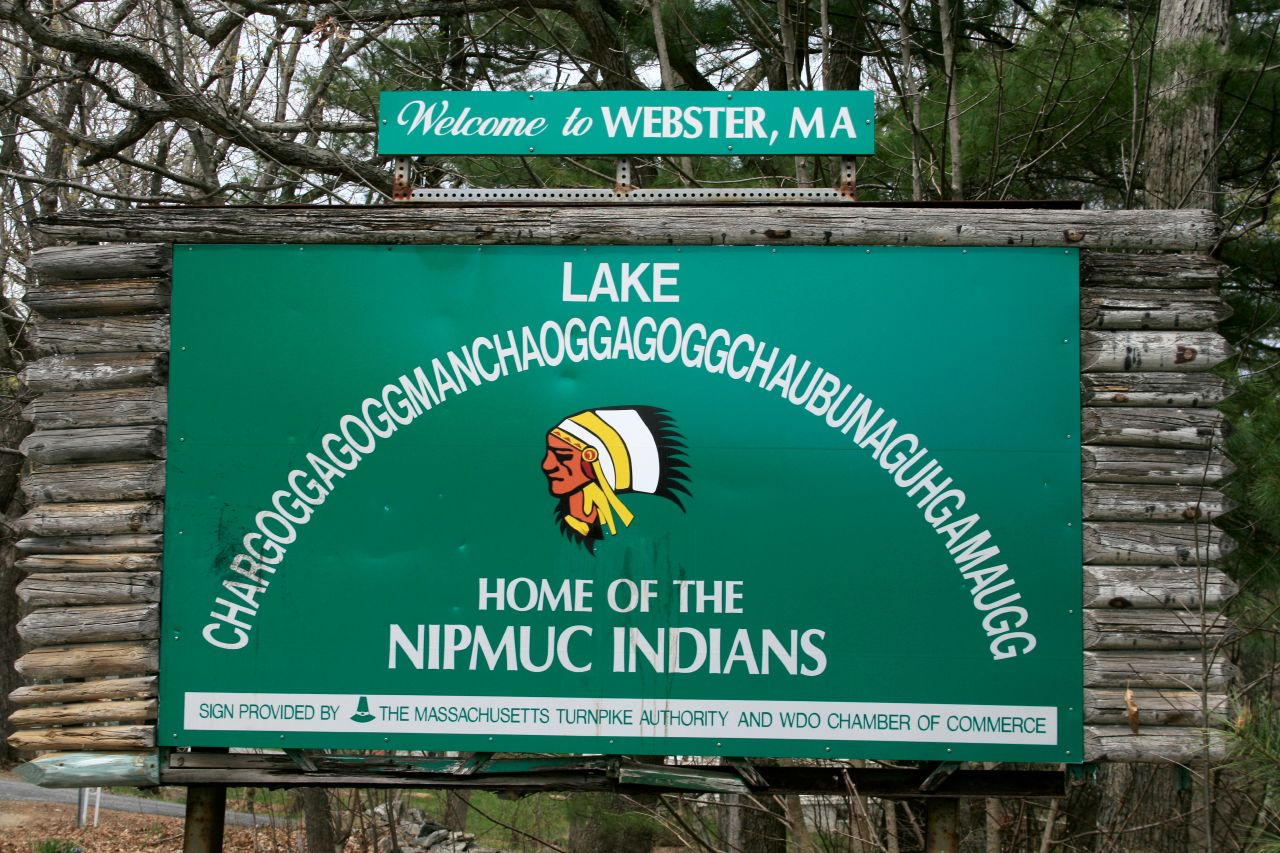
Chaubunagungamaug lake sign, a place name originating from the Nipmuck people

== Phonology ==
The phonology of Loup A (Nipmuck), reconstructed by Gustafson 2000:

Nipmuc consonants
	Bilabial	Alveolar		Palatal/ Postalveolar	Velar		Glottal
	Bilabial	plain	pal.	Palatal/ Postalveolar	plain	lab.	Glottal
Nasal	m	n					
Plosive	p	t	tʲ		k	(kʷ)	
Affricate				tʃ			
Fricative		s					h
Lateral		l					
Approximant	w			j			

Vowels
	Front	Back
Close	i, iː	u
Mid	e	o, oː
Open	a, aː, ã	

The vowel sounds likely have the same phonetic quality as other southern New England Algonquian languages. The short vowels /i o e a/ may represent the sounds as [ɪ], [ʊ], [ɛ, ə], and [ʌ], while the long vowels /iː/, /oː/, and /ã/ correspond to /i/, /o/, and /ã/.
