= Lake Chaubunagungamaug =

Lake in the town of Webster, Massachusetts, United States

- Webster Lake, Lake Chargoggagoggmanchauggagoggchaubunagungamaugg
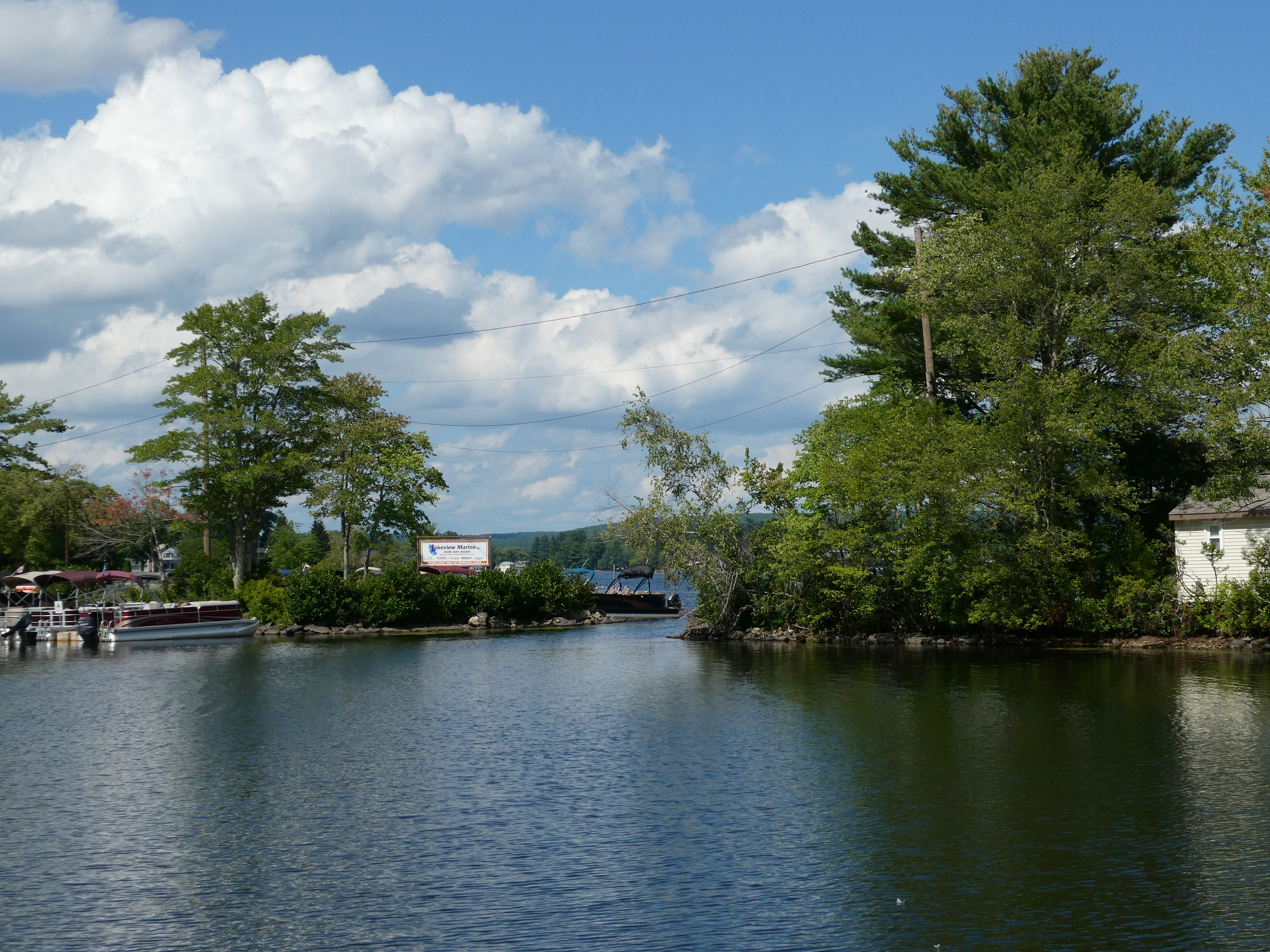
- Rail causeway across lake

- Location within Massachusetts Location within the United States
- Location: Webster, Massachusetts
- Coordinates: 42°02′30″N 71°50′30″W
- Type: Lake
- Basin countries: United States
- Max. length: 3.25 mi (5.23 km)
- Max. width: 1.125 mi (1.811 km)
- Surface area: 1,442 acres (584 ha)
- Average depth: 13 ft (4.0 m)
- Max. depth: 49 ft (15 m)
- Shore length^{1}: 17 mi (27 km)
- Surface elevation: 477 ft (145 m)
- Islands: 8
- ^{1} Shore length is not a well-defined measure.

Lake Chaubunagungamaug, (Note: Pronunciation: /tʃɔːˌbʌnəˈɡʌŋɡəˌmɔːɡ/ chaw-BUH-nə-GUNG-gə-mawg) also known as Webster Lake, is a lake in the New England town of Webster, Massachusetts. The lake is located near the border with Connecticut and has a surface area of 1,442 acres (2.253 mi^{2}).

Since 1912, the lake has also been known by a much longer name, having 45 letters comprising fourteen syllables: Lake Chargoggagoggmanchauggagoggchaubunagungamaugg. (Note: Pronunciation: /tʃərˌɡɒɡəɡɒɡˌmænˌtʃɔːɡəɡɒɡtʃəˌbʌnəˈɡʌŋɡəmɔːɡ/ chər-GOG-ə-gog-MAN-CHAW-gə-gog-chə-BUH-nə-GUNG-gə-mawg; OR: /tʃɑːrˌɡɔːɡəˌɡɔːɡmænˌtʃɔːɡəˌɡɔːɡtʃɔːˌbʌnəˈɡʌŋɡəˌmɔːɡ/ char-GAW-gə-GAWG-man-CHAW-gə-GAWG-chaw-BUH-nə-GUNG-gə-mawg) Under this name, it has become famous for having the longest name of any geographic feature in the United States.

== Name ==
The lake is known by several names. Lake Chaubunagungamaug is the name of the lake as recognized by the U.S. Department of the Interior, and is the name appearing in the earliest local records. Today, "Webster Lake" may be the name most used, but some (including many residents of Webster) take pride in reeling off the longer versions.

Algonquian-speaking people had several different names for the lake as recorded on old maps and historical records. However, all of these were similar in part and had almost the same translation. Among other early names were "Chabanaguncamogue" and "Chaubanagogum." Early town records show the name as "Chabunagungamaug Pond," which was also the name of the local Nipmuc town (recorded in 1668 and 1674 with somewhat different spellings). This has been translated as "boundary fishing place," but something close to "fishing place at the boundary" or "that which is a divided island lake" may be more accurate.

The name may originate from the Algonquian Loup languages of the Nipmuc.

A 1795 map of Massachusetts indicated the name, using the long form's first eight syllables, as "Chargoggagoggmanchoggagogg." A survey of the lake done in 1830 lists the name as "Chaubunagungamaugg," the six-syllable older name. The following year, both Dudley and Oxford, which then adjoined the lake, filed maps listing the lake by its eight-syllable form, as "Chargoggagoggmanchoggagogg." Anthropologist Ives Goddard considers that 1831 name to be a cartographer's creation that corrupted the actual name while confusing this lake with nearby Manchaug Pond.

=== Long name ===
The long name "Lake Chargoggagoggmanchauggagoggchaubunagungamaugg" is a 45-letter alternative name for this body of fresh water, often cited as the longest place name in the United States and one of the longest in the world. Some signs include an even longer 49-letter version of the name, "Chargoggagoggmanchauggauggagoggchaubunagungamaugg." Many area residents and the official website of the town of Webster consider the 45-letter version correct.

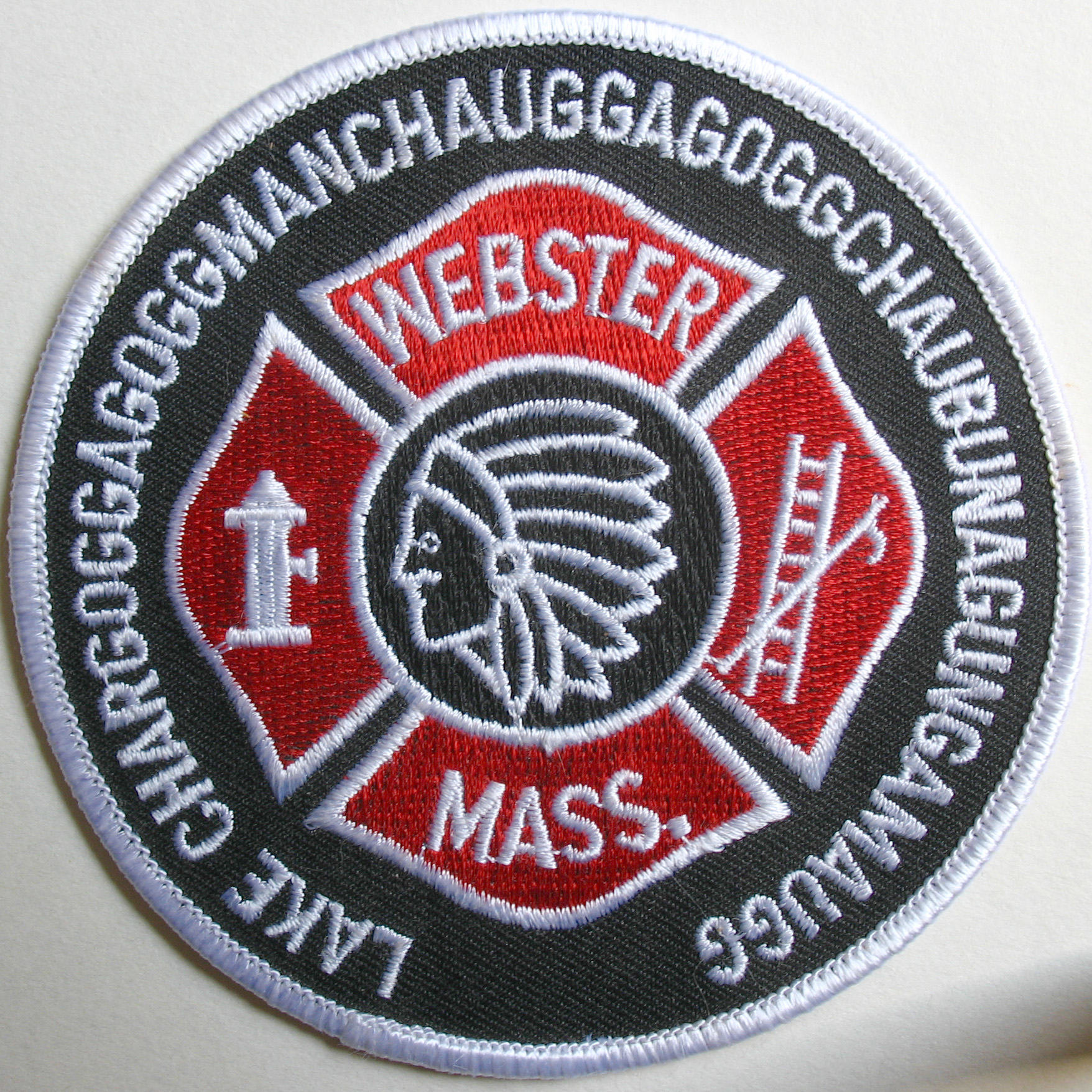
Patch using longer name of lake

The longer name has been translated as: "You fish on your side, I'll fish on my side, and no one shall fish in the middle." However, according to Ed Patenaude writing for the Worcester Telegram & Gazette in June 2001, this translation is a hoax, and the correct translation is "Fishing Place at the Boundaries—Neutral Meeting Grounds." A more fitting translation is "lake divided by islands," according to anthropologist Ives Goddard. By another account, according to Webster historian Paul Macek the name means "English knifemen and Nipmuck Indians at the boundary or neutral fishing place." The longer translation may have been invented by Laurence J. Daly, editor of The Webster Times. According to Ives Goddard, Curator of Anthropology at the Smithsonian Institution, Daly created this "monstrosity" around 1921, though this is probably not correct, as the name was in use as early as c. 1910 on postcards. Reportedly, Daly had confessed to fabricating the name on multiple occasions.

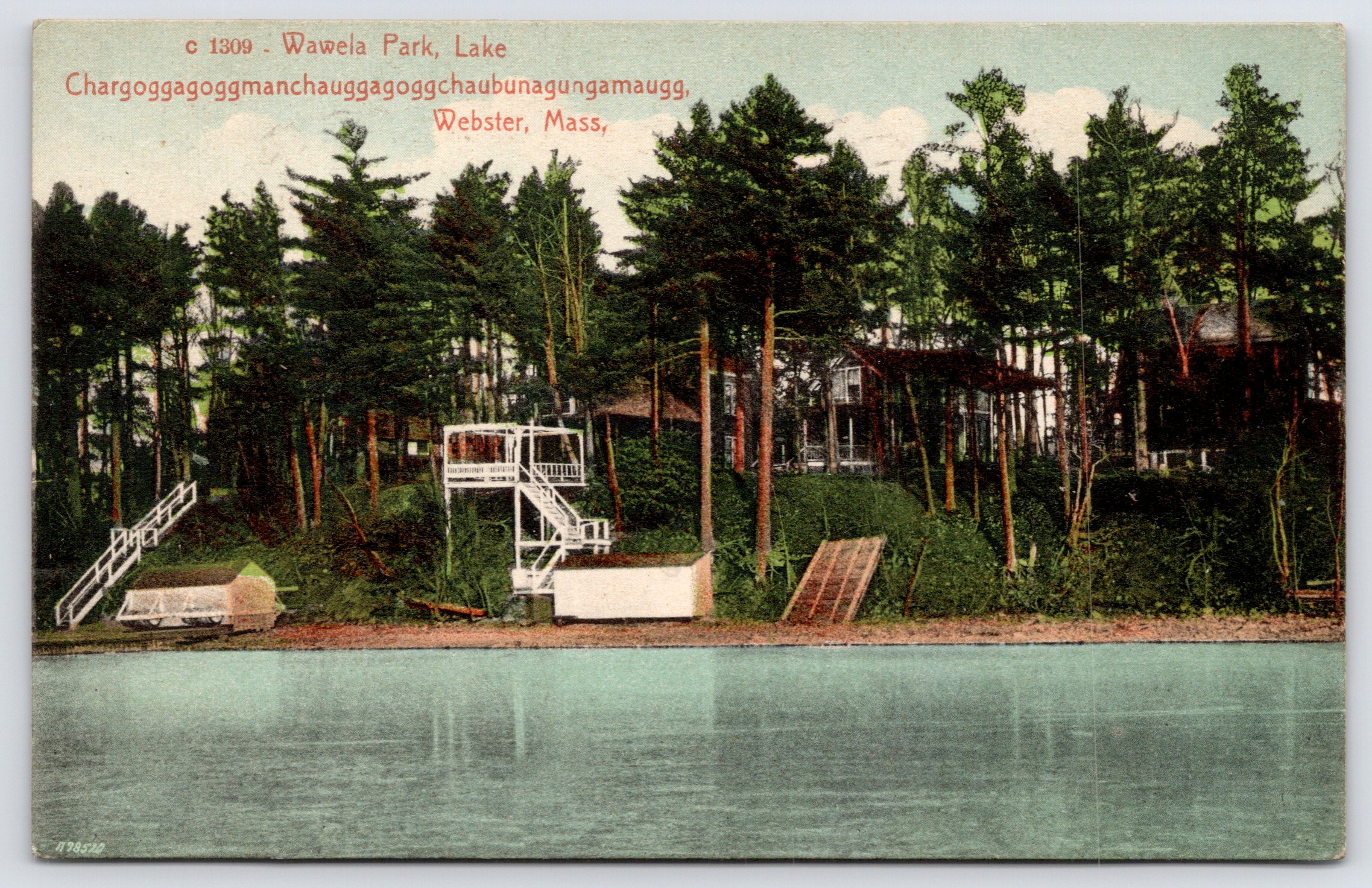
The lakeside

Spellings of the long name vary; in 2009, following six years of press reports, the local Chamber of Commerce agreed to have the spelling changed on its signs, but a 45-letter version of the name arrayed in a semicircle is still used. Webster public schools use one long form of the name in various capacities.

== Geography ==
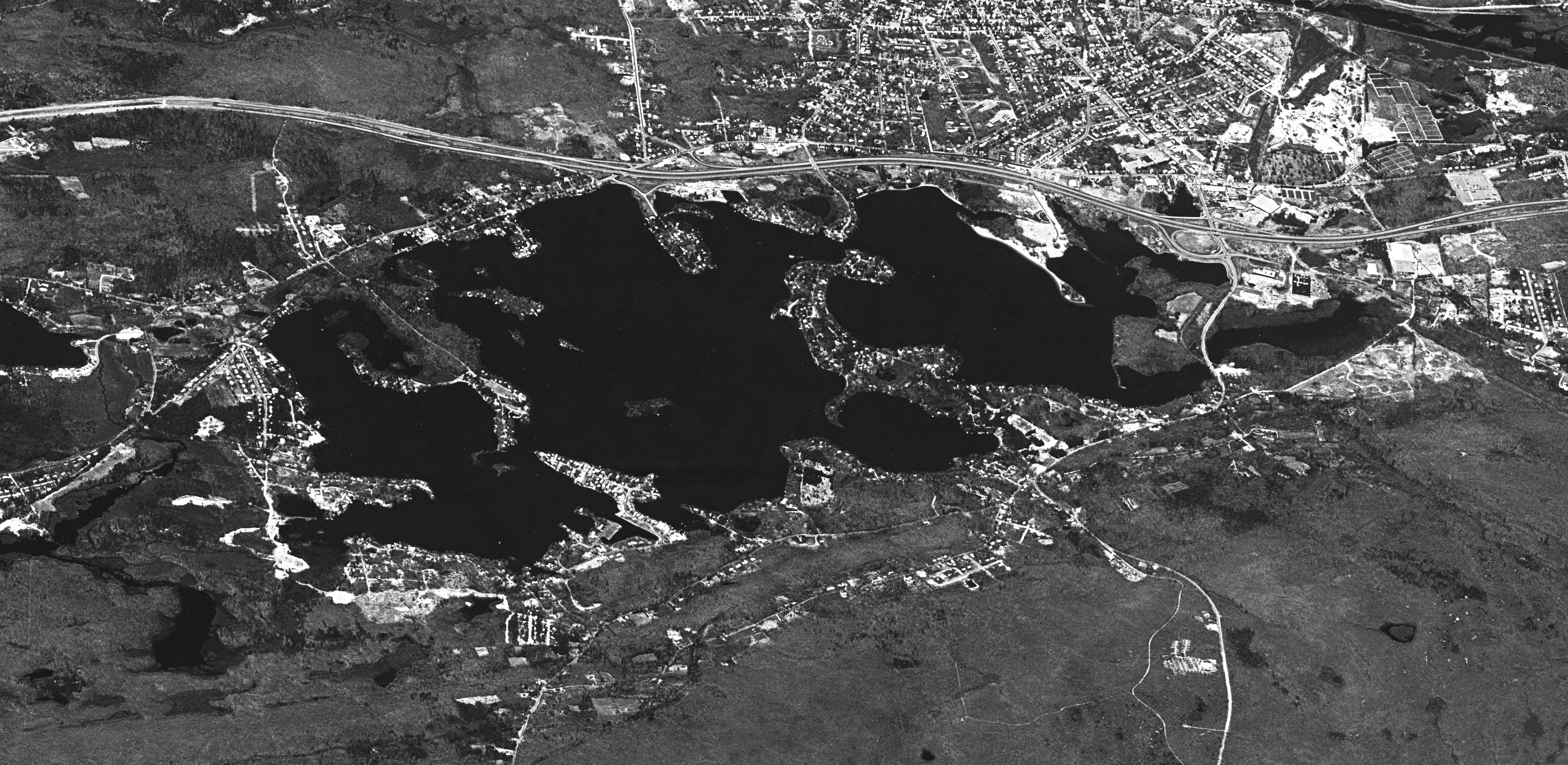
Oblique view of Lake Chaubunagungamaug in 1974

Webster Lake is a 1,442-acre (5.84 km^{2}) lake with a 17-mile (27 km) shoreline in southern Massachusetts, near the Connecticut border. It is the fourth largest fresh body of water in Massachusetts, after slightly larger Long Pond, The Wachusett Reservoir in Clinton, and the much larger Quabbin Reservoir. The average depth is 13 feet (4.0 m) and the maximum depth is 49 feet (15 m).

Although the lake is natural in origin, its outlet has a dam that raises the water level by roughly 2 feet (0.61 m). The dam initially provided water for a mill, and subsequently, the water rights to the lake were owned by Cranston Print Works; currently, the dam is owned by Webster Lake Preservation LLC.

The lake is commonly divided into three smaller bodies of water: North Pond, Middle Pond, and South Pond. Narrow channels connect them.

=== Islands ===
Webster Lake has about 7–8 islands. Some have houses and are habitable; a few are extremely small and uninhabitable. They include:

- Long Island: The largest island in Webster Lake. It has many homes, electric power lines, underground/underwater municipal water and sewer service, and several fire hydrants. It is in the Middle Pond.
- Goat Island is the second largest island. It has a few homes and boats. It is in the Middle Pond but isolated from the cluster of islands that includes Long Island.
- Well Island: A smaller island with one house west of Long Island in the Middle Pond.
- Strip Island: Generally northeast of Long Island and north of Cobble Island, with one house in the Middle Pond.
- Cobble Island: East of Long Island, in the Middle Pond.
- Little Island: In South Pond, right out of the no wake zone from the Middle Pond, one house.
- Birch Island: Large island on the west edge of Middle Pond with Pout Pond on the west side and swamp surrounding the entire island. It is located roughly between Treasure Island and The Narrows and has access by a bridge on Birch Island Road near The Narrows. Many homes are on the island, and an establishment once called Birch Island Pavilion is now called Waterfront Mary's.
- Misery Island is a small island near the east side of Narrows in Middle Pond. May be called either Misery Island or Skunk Island, depending on the map.

=== Marinas ===
Webster Lake has two marinas:

- Lakeview Marine: The only full-service marine store and service shop on Webster Lake.
- Point Breeze: A restaurant with a small marina. Point Breeze Marina has the only dockside gas pump on the lake.

== In popular culture ==
In the 1950s, a plan to shorten the official name of the lake inspired a poem of doggerel verse which concludes:

"Touch not a g!" No impious hand
Shall wrest one from that noble name
Fifteen in all their glory stand
And ever shall the same.
For never shall that number down,
Tho Gogg and Magogg shout and thunder;
Chargoggagoggmanchauggagoggchaubunagungamaugg's renown
Shall blaze, the beacon of the town,
While nations gaze and wonder.

Three songs about the lake's name have been written. The first was a regional song from the 1930s. The second, "The Lake Song (Chargoggagoggmanchauggagoggchaubunagungamaugg)," was recorded by Ethel Merman and Ray Bolger and released in 1954 by Decca. It presents Daly's fake translation as a Native American tradition, and includes a spoken section in which the singers take on heavily caricatured accents. The most recent was released in 2010 by Diane Taraz.

== See also ==
- Chaubunagungamaug Reservation
- List of long place names
- Lists of lakes of the United States
- Llanfairpwllgwyngyllgogerychwyrndrobwllllantysiliogogogoch, the longest place name in the UK
- Longest word in English
- Taumatawhakatangihangakoauauotamateaturipukakapikimaungahoronukupokaiwhenuakitanatahu, the longest place name in New Zealand, and the world
