= Nipmuc Nation =

State-recognized tribe in Massachusetts

- Nipmuc Nation Tribal Council Inc.
- Type: state-recognized tribe, nonprofit organization
- Tax ID no.: EIN 04-3395540
- Purpose: Cultural, Ethnic Awareness (A23)
- Headquarters: South Grafton, Massachusetts
- Official language: English
- Chairperson: Tenah Richardson
- Website: nipmucnation.org

The Nipmuc Nation is an Indigenous nonprofit entity based in South Grafton, Massachusetts.

The Nipmuc Nation worked with the Chaubunagungamaug Nipmuck, of Worcester County, Massachusetts. Most of the group's more than 500 members live throughout Worcester County, and across their ancestral homelands through central Massachusetts, northwestern Rhode Island and northeastern Connecticut.

In 2004, the Bureau of Indian Affairs determined that this group did not meet four of the seven mandatory requirements to be a federally recognized tribe.

== Nonprofit ==
The Nipmuc Nation founded a 501(c)(3) nonprofit organization, the Nipmuc Nation Tribal Council, Inc., based in South Grafton, Massachusetts, in 1998.

== Status determination ==
The following is based upon "Proposed Finding Against Federal Acknowledgment of the Webster/Dudley Band of Chaubunagungamaug Nipmuck Indians" (Oct. 2001) and reiterated in the "Final Determination to Decline Federal Acknowledgment of The Nipmuck Nation" (June 2004) and as such represents the views of the Department of the Interior and may differ from the views of Nipmuc Nation representatives. Note also that the following delineates the determinations which were unmet rather than those that were satisfied.

The Hassanamisco Reservation was sold in 1727, except for 500 acres (2.0 km^{2}), which was divided from 1727 to 1730 among seven Hassanamisco proprietary families who were each given individual ownership. The land was not the common property of a tribal entity and the State did not hold title to the reserved Hassanamisco property. There was no common fund, but each property-owning family got a share in the funds received from the sale of the land.

The historical Hassanamisco Indians were affected by the Massachusetts Enfranchisement Act of 1869, an act which "detribalized" the historical Hassanamisco Indians and temporarily ended the State's relationship with them.

At the time of the petition, the Nipmuc Nation group had 526 members. The Federal government rejected the Nipmuc Nation's argument that it has had continuous State recognition with a reservation. The Cisco family, one of the families in the petition, retains ownership of 2.5 acres (10,000 m^{2}) of land originally reserved for the historical Hassanamisco Indians. This is the land in the Town of Grafton that is known as the "Hassanamisco Reservation."

The Bureau of Indian Affairs determined that only two percent of the current membership of the Nipmuc Nation group descends from the historical Hassanamisco Indians. For at least 107 years, there was no State-recognized Indian entity and no State supervision. A limited relationship was created between the Hassanamisco Nipmuc's and the Commonwealth of Massachusetts after the establishment of the Massachusetts Commission on Indian Affairs (MCIA) in 1976.

As such, the Nipmuc Nation does not meet the Federal criterion which requires that it has been identified as an American Indian entity on a substantially continuous basis since 1900. For the period from 1900 to 1979, there were no external identifications of a Nipmuck entity broader than some of the Hassanamisco proprietary descendants.

The Nipmuc Nation group does not meet the Federal criterion which requires that a predominant portion of the petitioning group comprise a distinct community from historical times until the present. From 1785 through the early 1950s there continued to be a limited community made up of some of the descendants of the original Hassanamisco families residing in Grafton and in the city of Worcester, Massachusetts but only two percent of the Nipmuc petitioner's members descend from the Hassanamisco property-owning families.

It was not sufficiently proven that a community of Webster/Dudley Indian descendants and other Indians ancestral to the petitioner's members had coalesced around some of those Hassanamisco families by the 1920s. During the 1920s and 1930s there was some limited interaction in the context of pan-Indian organizations which also had non-Nipmuc and non-Indian members. The petitioner's ancestors did not constitute a distinct community from the 1920s through the 1950s.

During the 1960s and 1970s, Zara Cisco Brough, then the owner of the Hassanamisco Reservation property, created a number of lists of Nipmuc Indians. The evolving governing documents and membership lists of the period from 1961 through 1979 expanded the definition of the Nipmuck group beyond the Hassanamisco to include families.

The available evidence did not indicate to the government's satisfaction that the Nipmuc Nation maintained political influence over its members as an autonomous entity from historical times until the present.

Two percent of the members (which is 11 out of 526) descend from the historical Hassanamisco/Grafton Nipmuck tribe that was identified on the Earle Report in 1861. Fifty-three percent of the members (277 of 526) descend from six families ('Jaha, Humphrey, Belden, Pegan/Wilson, Pegan, Sprague) that were identified as Dudley/Webster Indians in 1861. Thirty-four percent of the members descend from a Nipmuc individual egregiously designated as a "Miscellaneous Indian" on the Earle Report, eight percent descend from Connecticut Indians, and three percent have other Indian ancestry.

== See also ==
- Native American tribes in Massachusetts
