= Route 193 (Connecticut–Massachusetts) =

Highway in Connecticut and Massachusetts

Route 193
- Map of northeastern Connecticut with CT 193 highlighted in solid red and of southern Massachusetts with MA 193 highlighted in dotted red

Route information
- Maintained by ConnDOT and MassDOT
- Length: 9.40 mi (15.13 km) Connecticut: 6.63 mi Massachusetts: 2.77 mi
- Existed: 1932–present

Major junctions
- South end: Route 12 in Thompson, CT
- Route 21 in Thompson, CT; Route 200 in Thompson Hill, CT; I-395 in Webster, MA
- North end: Route 12 / Route 16 in Webster, MA

Location
- Country: United States
- States: Connecticut, Massachusetts
- Counties: CT: Windham, MA: Worcester

Highway system
- Connecticut State Highway System; Interstate; US; State; SSR; SR; Scenic
← Route 192	→ Route 194
← Route 192	MA	→ I-195

Route 193 is a 9.40-mile-long (15.13 km) state highway in the U.S. states of Connecticut and Massachusetts. The route travels between the town centers of Thompson, Connecticut and Webster, Massachusetts. The road closely parallels Interstate 395 throughout its entire length. It is signed north–south, with the exception of one East-West Sign at the South end.

== Route description ==
Route 193 begins at an intersection with Route 12 in the southern part of the town of Thompson. It heads east over I-395 without an intersection, then turns northeast. Route 193 meets the north end of Route 21 a mile later before entering the town center of Thompson, where it has a junction with Route 200. North of the town center, it continues northeast and north, paralleling I-395 for another five miles (8 km) to the Massachusetts state line. In Massachusetts, the route runs along Lake Chaubunagungamaug (Webster Lake) just over the state line in the town of Webster, passing by the Hubbard Regional Hospital. It intersects with Interstate 395 at Exit 1, passing by the eastern edge of the town center, and ends at the junction of Routes 12 and 16 in the East Village section of Webster. Route 193 is known as Thompson Road in both states and is classified as a collector road, carrying an average daily traffic of about 2,500 vehicles.

== History ==
Part of Route 193, between Route 12 and the intersection with East Thompson Road, used to be part of the Boston Turnpike, a toll road that operated from 1797 to approximately 1879. In 1922, a loop route of New England Route 12 through Thompson center was designated as State Highway 185. The road from Thompson center north to the Massachusetts state line was designated as a secondary route known as State Highway 336. Modern Route 193 was established in the 1932 state highway renumbering from part of old Highway 185 and the entirety of Highway 336. At the same time, Massachusetts numbered the continuation of the road from Connecticut as Route 193. It has had no major changes since then.

== Major intersections ==
State	County	Location	mi	km	Destinations	Notes
Connecticut	Windham	Thompson	0.00	0.00	Route 12 – North Grosvenordale, Putnam	Southern terminus
Connecticut	Windham	Thompson	1.31	2.11	Route 21 south to US 44 – Putnam	Northern terminus of Route 21
Connecticut	Windham	Thompson	1.67	2.69	Route 200 west to I-395 – Thompson Center, North Grosvenordale	Eastern terminus of Route 200
Connecticut–Massachusetts state line			6.63 0.00	10.67 0.00	Route transition	
Massachusetts	Worcester	Webster	1.24	2.00	I-395 – Norwich, CT, Worcester	Exit 1 on I-395; former Route 52
Massachusetts	Worcester	Webster	2.77	4.46	Route 12 / Route 16 east to I-395 / Route 197 – Douglas, Milford, Worcester, Norwich, CT	Northern terminus; western terminus of Route 16
1.000 mi = 1.609 km; 1.000 km = 0.621 mi
