= Air Line State Park Trail =

Rail trail in Connecticut, US

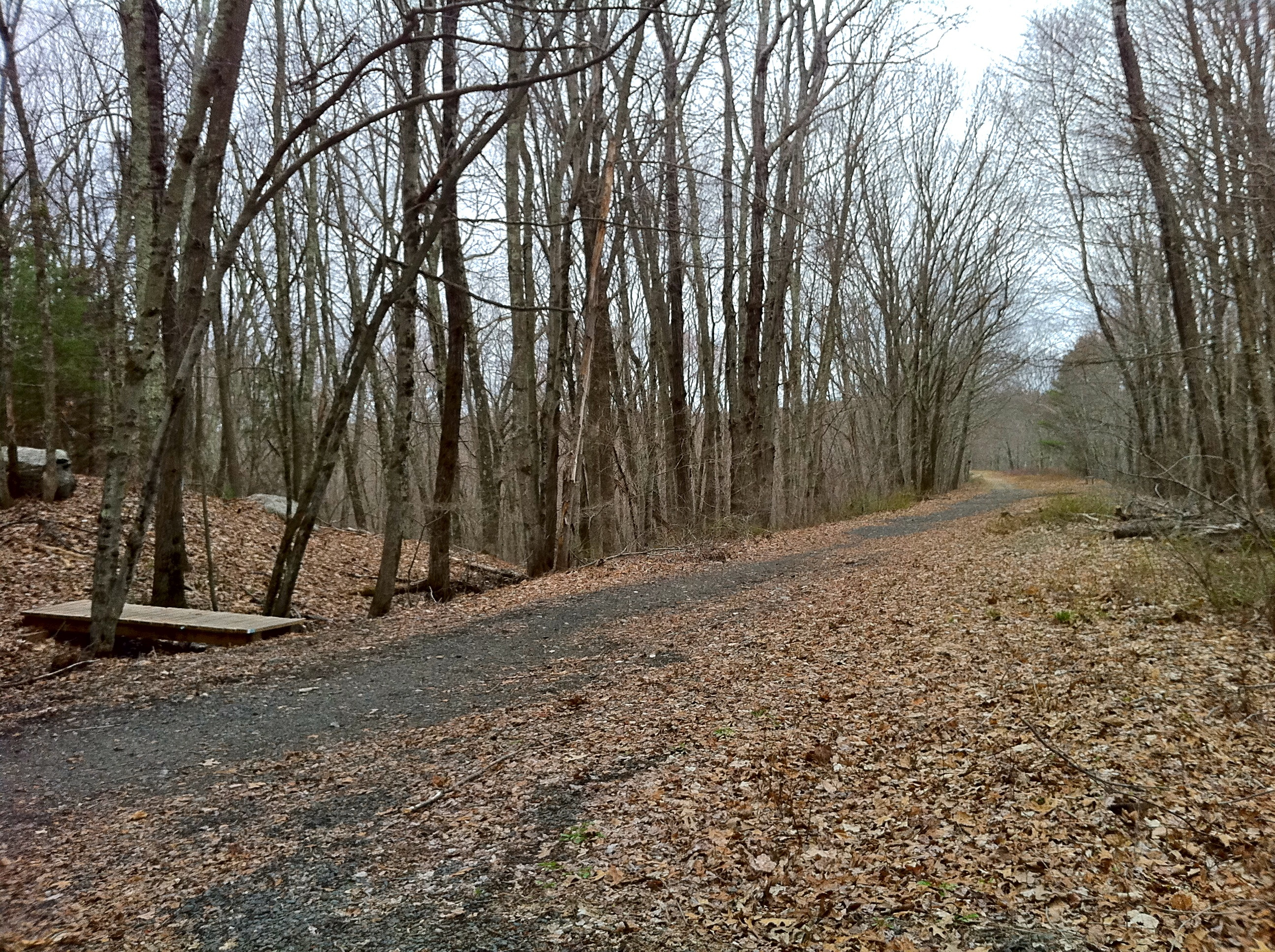
- Air Line Trail northeast of Black Spruce Pond in Hampton, CT (Pine Acres Lake View Trail intersection near Goodwin Conservation Center)
- Length: 54.9 miles (88.4 km)
- Location: Connecticut, United States
- Established: 1959
- Designation: Connecticut state park
- Use: Hiking, biking
- Surface: Mixed
- Maintainer: Connecticut Department of Energy and Environmental Protection
- Website: Official website

Air Line State Park Trail is a rail trail and linear state park located in Connecticut. The trail is divided into sections designated South (a 25-mile trail from East Hampton to Windham), North (a 21-mile trail from Windham to Putnam) a piece of the East Coast Greenway, and the Thompson addition (a 6.6-mile trail from Thompson to the Massachusetts state line). An additional 3.6-mile spur to Colchester is sometimes designated as part of the Air Line trail. At the Massachusetts state line, the trail connects to the Southern New England Trunkline Trail, a 22-mile-long trail to Franklin, MA built on the same right-of-way. Since 2018, the town of Portland, Connecticut has also maintained a 2.3-mile portion of the Air Line trail, connecting to the southern end of the state park at the town line with East Hampton.

The United States Department of the Interior recognized the southern section of the Air Line State Park Trail as a national recreation trail in 2002.

== History ==
=== Air Line ===
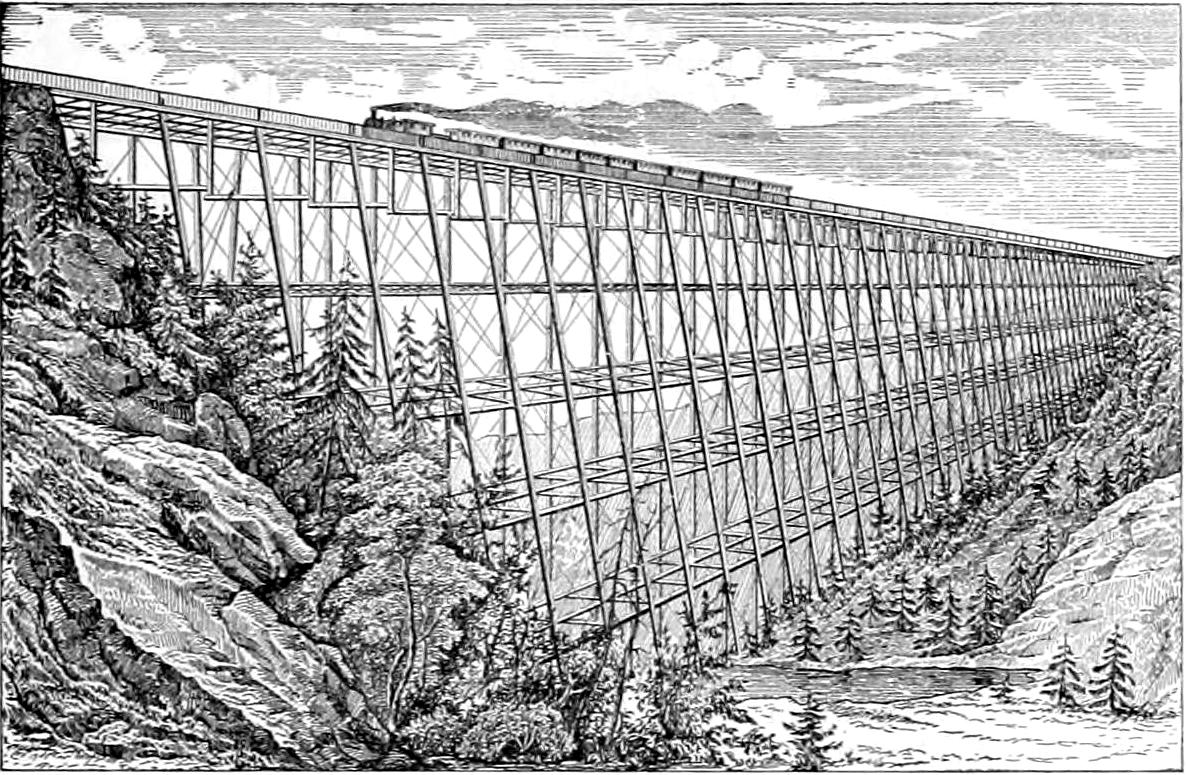
Lyman Viaduct, one of two towering iron trestles constructed for the Air Line

Envisioned as a high-speed passenger railroad line from New York to Boston, the New Haven, Middletown and Willimantic Railroad (NHM&W) got its name from the towering iron viaducts constructed to create a level track bed suitable for rapid travel. Opened in 1873 as part of the Boston, Hartford and Erie Railroad (BH&E) system, it ran from New Haven northeast via Middletown to the BH&E at Willimantic. The BH&E went bankrupt that same year, becoming the New York and New England Railroad (NY&NE), but the NHM&W stayed separate, failing in 1875. It was reorganized as the Boston and New York Air-Line Railroad and was operated by the New Haven from 1879, being leased on October 1, 1882. Part of this line (the NY&NE Blackstone division to Franklin via Norwood and Walpole) still survives as the Franklin/Foxboro Line of the MBTA Commuter Rail.

In Connecticut, part of the line from New Haven (Air Line Junction) to Middletown and Portland, Connecticut survives as part of the Providence and Worcester Railroad. In Willimantic, the Connecticut Eastern Railroad Museum has reconstructed the original roundhouse and restored the turntable pit (with a replacement for the original turntable), as well as some original NY&NE and NH buildings. In between East Hampton, Connecticut and the Massachusetts state line, most of the abandoned rail corridor has been converted as a rail trail known as the Air Line Trail State Park. Notable features of the line are the Rapallo Viaduct and the Lyman Viaduct in East Hampton and Colchester, Connecticut, which are two of the longest rail viaducts in the U.S.

=== Trail development ===
The abandoned rail corridor between East Hampton and the Massachusetts state line was acquired by the Connecticut State Park System with the section from Route 66 in Windham to US Route 44 in Pomfret opening to the public in 1969 as a bridle trail. In 1976, the trail designation was extended north to Town Farm Road in Putnam. The southern section from East Hampton to Willimantic was opened as a trail in 1986. The Thompson section was opened in 1992. The bridge over the Willimantic River to Bridge St. was opened in 2015, and an extension south to Portland opened in 2018.

Air Line State Park Trail is divided into three sections:

- South section (from Middle Haddam Road in Portland to Bridge Street in Windham, with a connection to Columbia Avenue)
- North section (from Milk Street in Windham to Kennedy Drive in Putnam)
- Thompson section (from Route 12 (Riverside Drive) in Thompson to the MA state line)

The North section of the trail from Windham to Putnam is part of the East Coast Greenway, which will stretch from Florida to Maine.

The South and North sections are connected by the Veterans Greenway, a short town-owned rail trail on the northeast side of Willimantic, which is partially incorporated into the North section itself. The connection is not complete, as no trail connection has yet to be made through downtown Willimantic from the bridge to the Veterans Greenway. However, a street connection is available, joining the two sections by using bike lanes along Riverside Drive.

==== Southern extensions ====
The trail as originally built ended next to a cranberry bog at Smith Street, east of the village center of East Hampton. The right of way remained intact and unused as far as the end of the active track in Portland; some sections were used for unofficial trails with poor trail surface and frequent washouts.

In 1999, a bridge over Muddy Gutter Brook west of downtown East Hampton was designed and built by cadets of the United States Coast Guard Academy. Due to confusion as to which state agency had ownership of the stretch of land, the bridge was built without the necessary permissions; it was almost demolished, but allowed to remain due to a lease agreement with the town. On November 1, 2002, the state DEEP acquired an additional section of railbed in East Hampton from ConnDOT; however, the trail was not actually improved over the section.

In 2011, a 0.5-mile (0.80 km) extension from Smith Street to Watrous Street was completed. A further 0.1-mile (0.16 km) section (including a bridge over the Pocotopaug Creek) was completed in June 2012, bringing the trail to Main Street in downtown East Hampton. During construction, the original railroad bridge was found to have been buried in the embankment next to the right of way, forcing design changes to the trail.

Around that time, East Hampton and Portland began planning to extend the trail to downtown Portland, which would additionally provide a connection to Middletown over the Arrigoni Bridge. In January 2015, East Hampton received a $400,000 grant for Phase I, running 1.7 miles (2.7 km) from Main Street to Aldens Crossing; that section opened in 2017. A second $538,000 state grant, awarded in March 2016, funded the 1.5-mile (2.4 km) Phase II from Aldens Crossing to the town line at Depot Hill Road. Work on Phase II began in 2017. As of January 2019, phase II was complete except for a 1,500 feet (460 m) section through protected wetlands, which may require a boardwalk.

In June 2018, Phase I of the town-maintained portion of the trail in Portland, Connecticut opened to the public, extending from the East Hampton town line to the YCMA Camp Ingersoll, a distance of 2.3 miles (3.7 km). Unlike the rest of the trail, the 2.3-mile right-of-way in Portland is owned by Eversource Energy.

In December 2015, the town approved an agreement with Eversource to allow the construction of a recreational trail on their property; a formal signing took place on January 20, 2016. On March 2, 2016, town voters approved the $172,000 acquisition of a 22-acre (8.9 ha) former quarry Middle Haddam Road to serve as the trailhead; this served as the 20% local match for potential state funding. An existing quarter-mile access road to the quarry leads north from the trailhead parking area to the rail trail. Later that month, the extension was allocated $686,000 in the same round of grants that funded the East Hampton Phase II. The section was originally expected to open around April 2017; several delays ultimately resulted in an October 2018 opening.

Further phases in Portland are planned but not yet funded. Phase II will reach downtown Portland and the Arrigoni bridge, largely over the original rail route but with some deviations parallel to roads. It may also include a trail parallel to the active P&W tracks in Portland and the purchase of the former train station. Following abandonment by the railroad in the 1960s, the remainder of the original Airline right-of-way in Portland reverted to private ownership by adjacent landowners and would need to be leased or acquired by the town prior to construction of Phase II. Phase III will attempt to create a trail north parallel to the Connecticut River to reach Riverfront Park, the fairgrounds, and ultimately Glastonbury.

== South section ==
=== Trail description ===
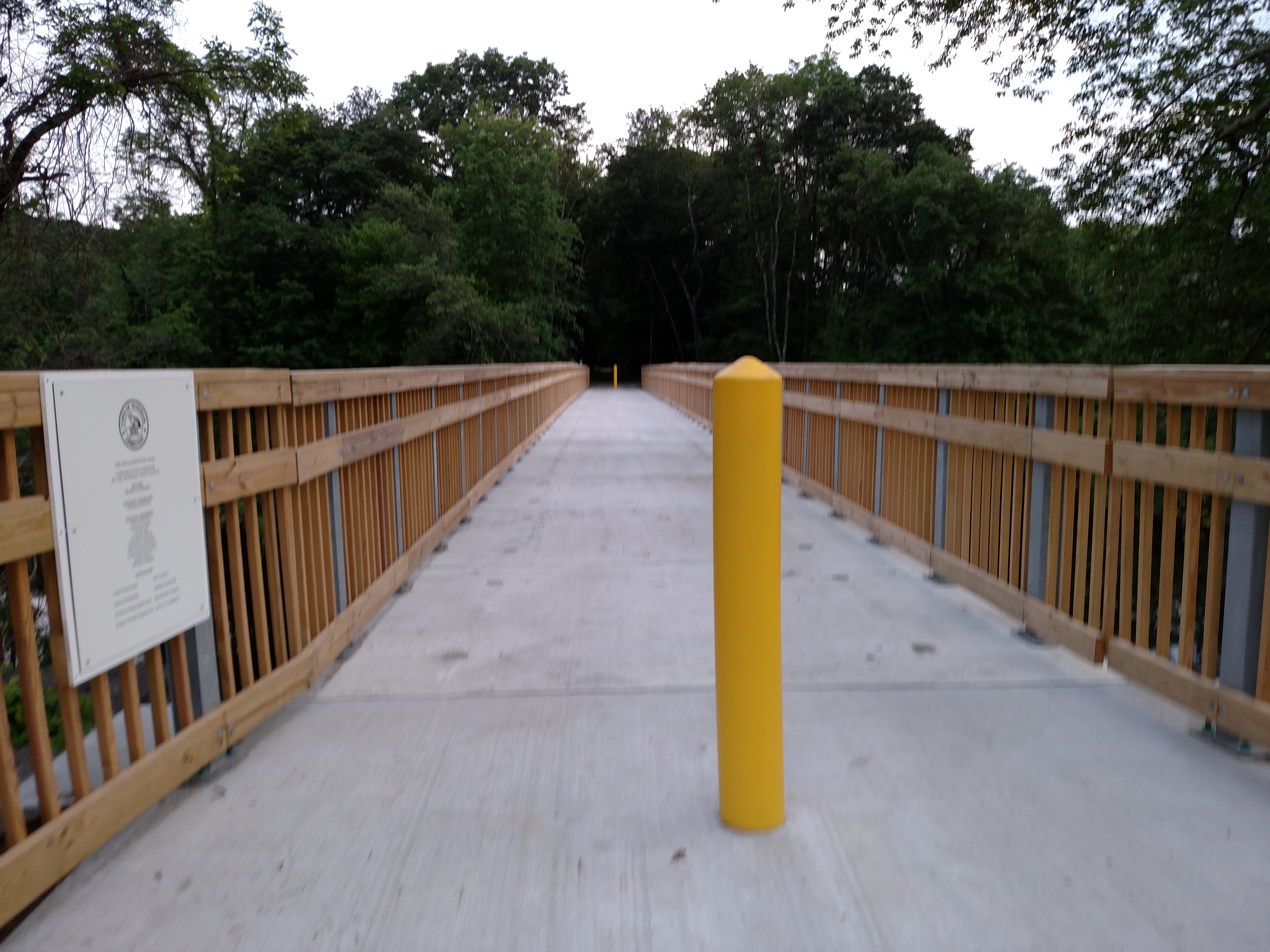
The Airline Trail South bridge over the Willimantic River

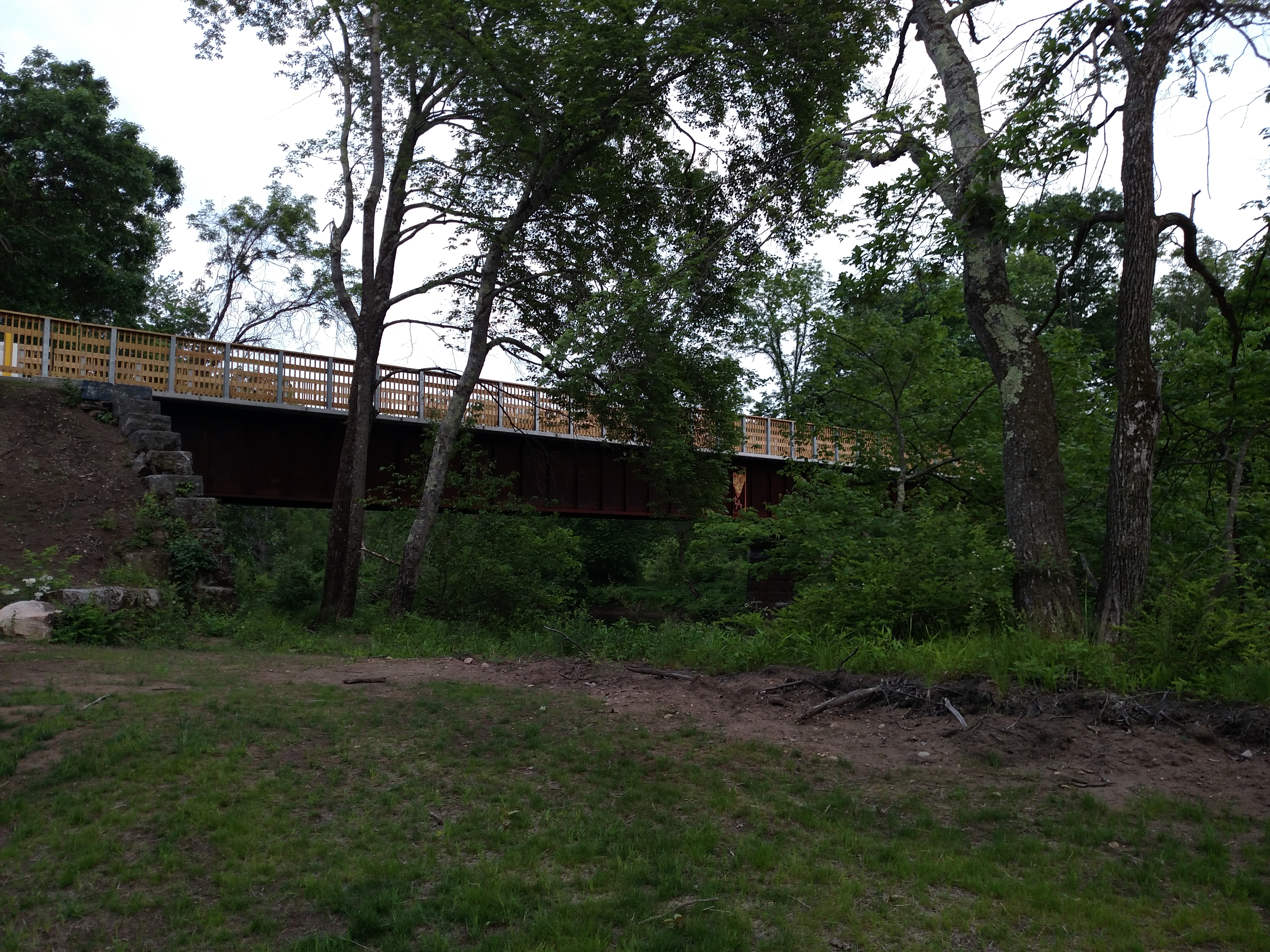
The bridge from the Hop River Trail

This section of the trail has been completed. It has a smooth, hard-packed stone dust surface, benches for resting at more scenic locations, and bike racks. Brand new bridges constructed by cadets from the US Coast Guard Academy carry the trail across the Blackledge, Jeremy Rivers, and Judd Brook. This section crosses the Rapallo and Lyman Viaducts, massive fills that carried the railroad and now trail across wide valleys. There is a short (less than 1/4 mile (400 m)) on-road detour necessary where the Route 2 expressway blocks the railroad bed.

==== Willimantic River to Bridge St. (CT 32) ====
This section has a wooden plank crossing over the Willimantic River, using the old bridge as support, then shortly after that it becomes pavement and intersects with the end of the Hop River Trail and has an info sign describing the history of both of the trails. Then it takes a S-turn next to the Eastern Connecticut Railroad History Museum. Then the trail follows the driveway of the building leading up to the trailhead, just 900 ft. away from Bridge St. This section can be very loud at times due to being less than 100 ft. away from the Providence and Worcester Railroad, an active freight railroad with a stop in Willimantic.

=== Access points ===
The trail crosses the following roads, providing access:

County	Town	Street		Coordinates
Middlesex	Portland	Middle Haddam Road	Trail terminus, parking area	41.5658°N 72.5837°W
Middlesex	Portland	Breezy Corners Road		41.5663°N 72.5791°W
Middlesex	Portland	Middle Haddam Road	overpass	41.5645°N 72.5779°W
Middlesex	Portland	Old Middletown Road		41.5647°N 72.5635°W
Middlesex	East Hampton	Depot Hill Road	parking area	41.5657°N 72.5574°W
Middlesex	East Hampton	Route 66, West High Street		41.5654°N 72.5390°W
Middlesex	East Hampton	Aldens Crossing		41.5644°N 72.5294°W
Middlesex	East Hampton	Forest Street		41.5705°N 72.5068°W
Middlesex	East Hampton	Route 196, Main Street	municipal parking area, railroad bridge	41.5750°N 72.5022°W
Middlesex	East Hampton	Watrous Street		41.5755°N 72.5004°W
Middlesex	East Hampton	Smith Street	parking area	41.5782°N 72.4924°W
New London	Colchester	Bull Hill Road	parking area	41.5655°N 72.4430°W
New London	Colchester	River Road	parking area; railroad bridge	41.5805°N 72.4249°W
New London	Colchester	River Road		41.5830°N 72.4080°W
New London	Colchester	Route 149	parking area	41.5850°N 72.4000°W
Tolland	Hebron	On road: under Route 2 via Route 149		
Tolland	Hebron	Old Hartford Road	parking area	41.5918°N 72.3914°W
Tolland	Hebron	Jeremy River	river crossing	41.5983°N 72.3769°W
Tolland	Hebron	Grayville Road	parking area	41.6147°N 72.3664°W
Tolland	Hebron	Old Colchester Road	parking area	41.6204°N 72.3598°W
Tolland	Hebron	Route 85	parking area	41.6322°N 72.3437°W
Tolland	Hebron	North Pond Road		41.6336°N 72.3430°W
Tolland	Hebron	Route 207	parking area	41.6397°N 72.3395°W
New London	Lebanon	Leonard Bridge Road	parking area	41.6525°N 72.3032°W
New London	Lebanon	Chesbro Bridge Road	parking area	41.6629°N 72.2902°W
Tolland	Columbia	Route 87		41.6742°N 72.2681°W
New London	Lebanon	Cook Hill Road	parking area	41.6852°N 72.2651°W
New London	Lebanon	Village Hill Road	parking area	41.6973°N 72.2511°W
New London	Lebanon	Kingsley Road	parking area	41.7085°N 72.2418°W
County Line	Town Line	Willimantic River	river crossing	41.7134°N 72.2379°W
Windham	Windham	Paved Section begins		41.7138°N 72.2375°W
Windham	Windham	Hop River State Park Trail	leads to Bolton and Hartford area	41.7138°N 72.2375°W
Windham	Windham	Bridge Street ( CT 32)	Opened in 2015, parking area	41.7122°N 72.2230°W

== North section ==
=== Trail description ===
Though open to the public for its entire length, different segments of the trail are in different stages of development. Some sections are complete and have a finished, stone-dust surface and signage. Other sections have been cleared and had drainage work done, but still have a somewhat rough, unfinished surface that is not suitable for road bikes. Other parts are totally undeveloped and overgrown.

There are no major obstructions of the North section of the trail in the form of missing or unsafe bridges. Though some parts of the trail may be undeveloped, this area does not have the many river crossings of the southern section.

The trail continues west of Route 66 as the Veterans Greenway, a town-owned bike route that leads to downtown Willimantic.

==== Route 66, Windham to South Brook Road, Hampton ====
This section has seen many upgrades in recent years. The section's first 1/4 mile (400 m) was paved as part of the US 6/Route 66 interchange reconstruction project. The state and the towns of Windham and Chaplin cleared, graded, installed signage, and put down a smooth stone-dust surface on this section of the trail. This included the construction of a trail bridge over Boulevard Road.

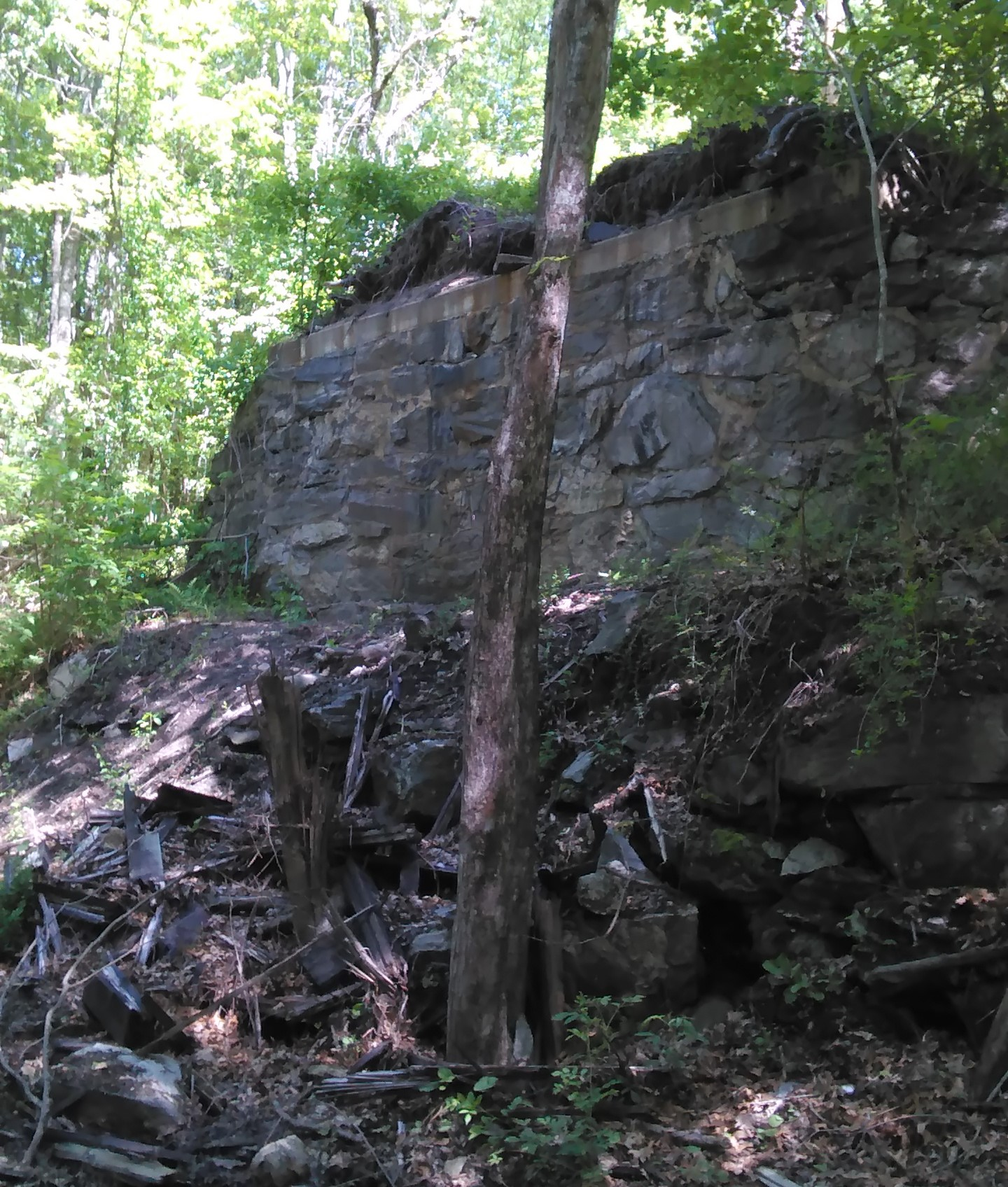
Abutment of the former Parker Road overpass, which collapsed onto the trail in May 2016

==== South Brook Road, Hampton to Lewis Road, Hampton ====
This section was cleared and graded by the National Guard in the mid-1990s. The surface was not finished and is still rough in sections and there are drainage issues in areas that sometimes flood the trail. There has not been much maintenance done on the trail in the last few years, so even the areas that were cleared have become somewhat grown in. Still, the trail is passable for hikers, equestrians, and mountain bikers. The town of Hampton and the DEEP have plans to add signage and finish the surface of the trail with stone dust. This work has not yet been started. An abandoned overpass that formerly carried Parker Road over the line collapsed in May 2016; the trail section was briefly closed during cleanup.

==== Lewis Road, Hampton to Wrights Crossing Road, Pomfret ====
This section is under construction by the DEEP, DOT, and town of Pomfret. The stretch from Lewis Road to Covell Road is currently being worked on to improve drainage and finish the surface. The trail is completed between Covell Road and Route 169, with a smooth stone-dust surface. The section from Route 169 to Wrights Crossing Road is essentially complete, with some drainage improvements planned.

==== Wrights Crossing Road, Pomfret to Kennedy Drive, Putnam ====
This section of the trail is completely undeveloped. It has not been cleared and is overgrown, with a rough surface, tree falls, and several wet areas with drainage problems. It is necessary to climb embankments to cross some roads where former bridges have been filled in. It is not really passable and must be done on foot if attempted. The DEEP and the towns of Pomfret and Putnam have plans to clear and improve this section as part of the next phase of trail improvements. Currently, a DOT state-hired contractor is improving this section, with a budget of $5.5 million. Two pedestrian bridges are proposed: a 100-foot span over Routes 169 and 44 at the old train depot and another on Needles Eye Road near the Audubon Center. Three box culverts on Holmes Road, Modock Road, and River Road are also proposed. Estimated completion is Fall 2020.

=== Access points ===
The trail crosses the following roads, providing access:

County	Town	Street		Coordinates
Windham	Windham	Union Street	Terminus	41.7112°N 72.2087°W
Windham	Windham	Milk Street	parking area	41.7124°N 72.2064°W
Windham	Windham	Valley Street		41.7125°N 72.2062°W
Windham	Windham	Route 195		41.7190°N 72.1994°W
Windham	Windham	Natchaug River	river crossing	41.7213°N 72.1970°W
Windham	Windham	Private Drive		41.7303°N 72.1861°W
Windham	Windham	Route 66		41.7322°N 72.1848°W
Windham	Windham	Next to road: Tuckie Road	No junction	
Windham	Windham	End of the Veterans' Memorial Greenway (improved section begins)		41.7349°N 72.1795°W
Windham	Windham	Route 203		41.7462°N 72.1560°W
Windham	Windham	Boulevard Road		41.7488°N 72.1520°W
Windham	Chaplin	Chewink Road	parking area	41.7515°N 72.1208°W
Windham	Hampton	South Brook Street	Shared Intersection	41.7656°N 72.0942°W
Windham	Hampton	Parker Road	Shared Intersection	41.7656°N 72.0942°W
Windham	Hampton	US Route 6	Overpass - no connection	41.7692°N 72.0905°W
Windham	Hampton	Potter Road	parking: Goodwin Conservation Center	41.7777°N 72.0866°W
Windham	Hampton	Estabrooks Road		41.7987°N 72.0908°W
Windham	Hampton	Station Road		41.8074°N 72.0701°W
Windham	Hampton	Griffin Road		41.8196°N 72.0661°W
Windham	Hampton	Little River	river crossing	41.8223°N 72.0571°W
Windham	Hampton	Kenyon Road	parking area	41.8225°N 72.0563°W
Windham	Hampton	Lewis Road		41.8270°N 72.0414°W
Windham	Pomfret	Route 97		41.8336°N 72.0192°W
Windham	Pomfret	Brooklyn Road		41.8343°N 72.0126°W
Windham	Pomfret	US Route 44	underpass/no access	41.8593°N 71.9998°W
Windham	Pomfret	Covell Road		41.8628°N 71.9919°W
Windham	Pomfret	Babbitt Hill Road		41.8641°N 71.9832°W
Windham	Pomfret	Route 169 / US Route 44	Parking area. Trail bridge over road.	41.8678°N 71.9611°W
Windham	Pomfret	Needles Eye Road	Trail bridge over road	41.8746°N 71.9496°W
Windham	Pomfret	Wright's Crossing Road		41.8776°N 71.9420°W
Windham	Pomfret	Unimproved Section begins		41.8776°N 71.9420°W
Windham	Pomfret	Holmes Road	Underpass	41.8823°N 71.9344°W
Windham	Putnam	Modock Road	Underpass	41.8857°N 71.9219°W
Windham	Putnam	River Road	Underpass	41.8895°N 71.9141°W
Windham	Putnam	Town Farm Road		41.8936°N 71.9104°W
Windham	Putnam	Private Road		41.9078°N 71.9080°W
Windham	Putnam	Quinebaug River	river crossing	41.9079°N 71.9080°W
Windham	Putnam	Kennedy Drive	Terminus	41.9084°N 71.9080°W

== Thompson section ==
=== Trail description ===
Major work has been completed to upgrade this section of the trail. The rails and ties have been removed, and the surface of the trail for much of its length consists of hard-packed dirt and gravel. However, as of 2021, the trail is largely unimproved between Lowell Davis Road and Sand Dam Road. New parking areas with signage and information kiosks have been constructed where the trail crosses East Thompson Road, Sand Dam Road, Lowell Davis Road, and at the southern terminus at Route 12. In 2019 the Connecticut Department of Energy and Environmental Protection (CTDEEP) made a master plan to re-establish the economic significance and value of the Air Line Trail. As of 2023, the work that is still planned includes improvements to the Route 193 crossing. The trail continues north and east into Massachusetts through the town of Douglas as the Southern New England Trunkline Trail, part of the Massachusetts State Park System.

=== Access points ===
The trail crosses the following roads, providing access:

County	Town	Street		Coordinates
Windham	Thompson	Route 193, Thompson Road	Terminus (south of Thompson center)	41.9475°N 71.8851°W
Windham	Thompson	Exit 49 ramps	Overpass above ramps - no connection	41.9547°N 71.8809°W
Windham	Thompson	Plum Road		41.9643°N 71.8764°W
Windham	Thompson	Route 200, Thompson Hill Road	Underpass - no connection	41.9669°N 71.8740°W
Windham	Thompson	Sunset Hill Road		41.9764°N 71.8658°W
Windham	Thompson	Lowell Davis Road		41.9846°N 71.8566°W
Windham	Thompson	Interstate 395	Underpass - no connection	41.9873°N 71.8531°W
Windham	Thompson	Route 193, Thompson Road	Underpass - no connection (north of Thompson center)	41.9929°N 71.8438°W
Windham	Thompson	Sand Dam Road		42.0045°N 71.8201°W
Windham	Thompson	East Thompson Road		42.0089°N 71.8091°W
Massachusetts border			Connection with Southern New England Trunkline Trail	42.0124°N 71.7995°W

== Colchester Spur ==
=== Trail description ===
The 3.6-mile (5.8 km) spur to Colchester consists of the same hard-packed gravel as the rest of the South section. The Route 85 crossing is at a marked crosswalk, while the two other crossings are unmarked over minor local roads. The trail terminates just east of downtown Colchester at the former depot and freight house.

=== Access points ===
The trail crosses the following roads, providing access:

County	Town	Street		Coordinates
Tolland	Hebron	Route 85		41.6196°N 72.3441°W
Tolland	Hebron	Crouch Road		41.6139°N 72.3428°W
New London	Colchester	Old Amston Road		41.5947°N 72.3335°W
New London	Colchester	Route 16	Terminus	41.5795°N 72.3273°W
