= Mechanicsville, Connecticut =

Census-designated place in Connecticut, United States

- Census-designated place
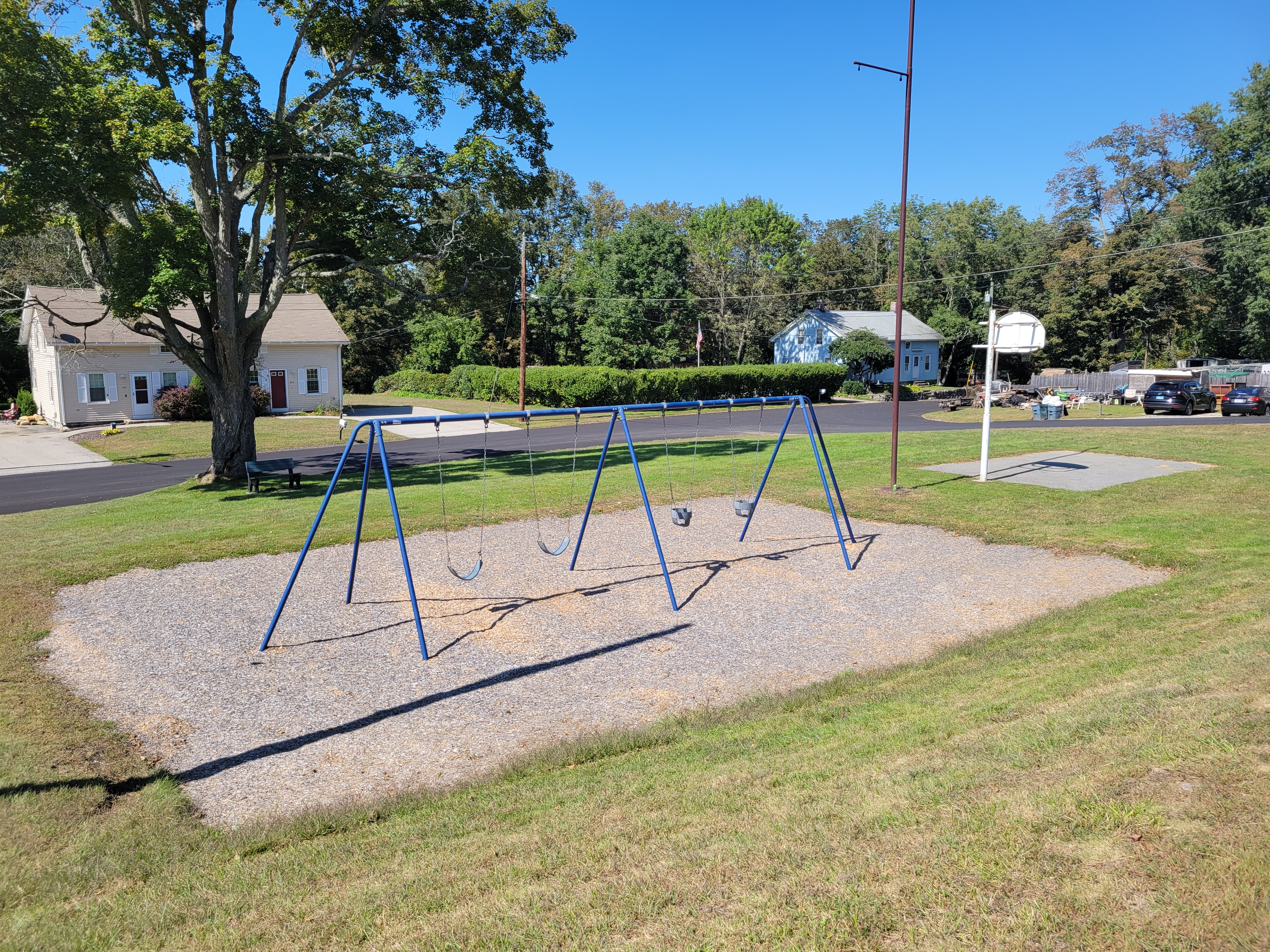
- Mechanicsville Park

- Location within Connecticut Location within the United States
- Coordinates: 41°56′28″N 71°53′37″W
- Country: United States
- State: Connecticut
- County: Windham
- Town: Thompson

Area
  - Total: 0.83 sq mi (2.16 km^{2})
  - Land: 0.83 sq mi (2.16 km^{2})
  - Water: 0 sq mi (0.0 km^{2})
- Elevation: 310 ft (94 m)
- Time zone: UTC-5 (Eastern (EST))
  - Summer (DST): UTC-4 (EDT)
- ZIP Codes: 06277 (Thompson); 06255 (North Grosvenordale)
- Area codes: 860/959
- FIPS code: 09-46240
- GNIS feature ID: 2805993

Mechanicsville is an unincorporated community and census-designated place (CDP) in the southern part of the town of Thompson in Windham County, Connecticut, United States. It is bordered to the north by North Grosvenordale and to the south by Putnam. Connecticut Route 12 (Riverside Drive) runs the length of the community, along the east side of the French River.

Mechanicsville was first listed as a CDP prior to the 2020 census. As of the 2020 census, Mechanicsville had a population of 540.

A portion of the Air Line State Park Trail passes through Mechanicsville, along with the Providence and Worcester Railroad.
