= Lyman Viaduct =

- U.S. National Register of Historic Places
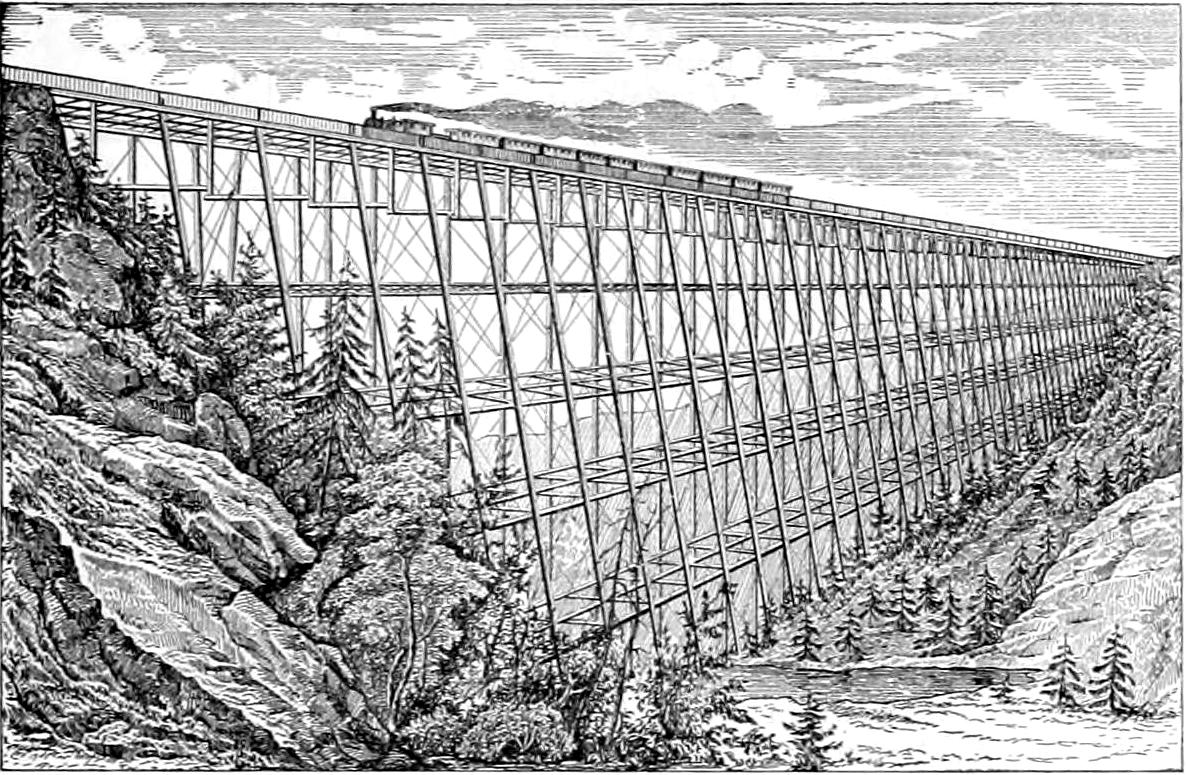

- Location within Connecticut Location within the United States
- Location: Dickinson Creek and former Boston and New York Air Line Railroad right-of-way, Colchester, Connecticut
- Coordinates: 41°33′49″N 72°27′8″W
- Area: 1 acre (0.40 ha)
- Built: 1873
- Built by: Phoenix Iron Works
- Architect: Serrell, Edward W., Air Line Railroad
- NRHP reference No.: 86002729
- Added to NRHP: August 21, 1986

The Lyman Viaduct is a buried railroad trestle built over Dickinson Creek in Colchester, Connecticut, in 1873. Along with the nearby Rapallo Viaduct, it is one of the few surviving wrought iron railroad trestles from the first generation of such structures. It was built for the Boston and New York Air-Line Railroad, whose successor, the New York, New Haven and Hartford Railroad (NYNH&H), buried it in sand rather than replacing it with a stronger structure. The bridge was added to the National Register of Historic Places in 1986 since it is capable of providing detailed information about construction methods of the period. The bridge now carries the multi-use Air Line State Park Trail.

== Description and history ==
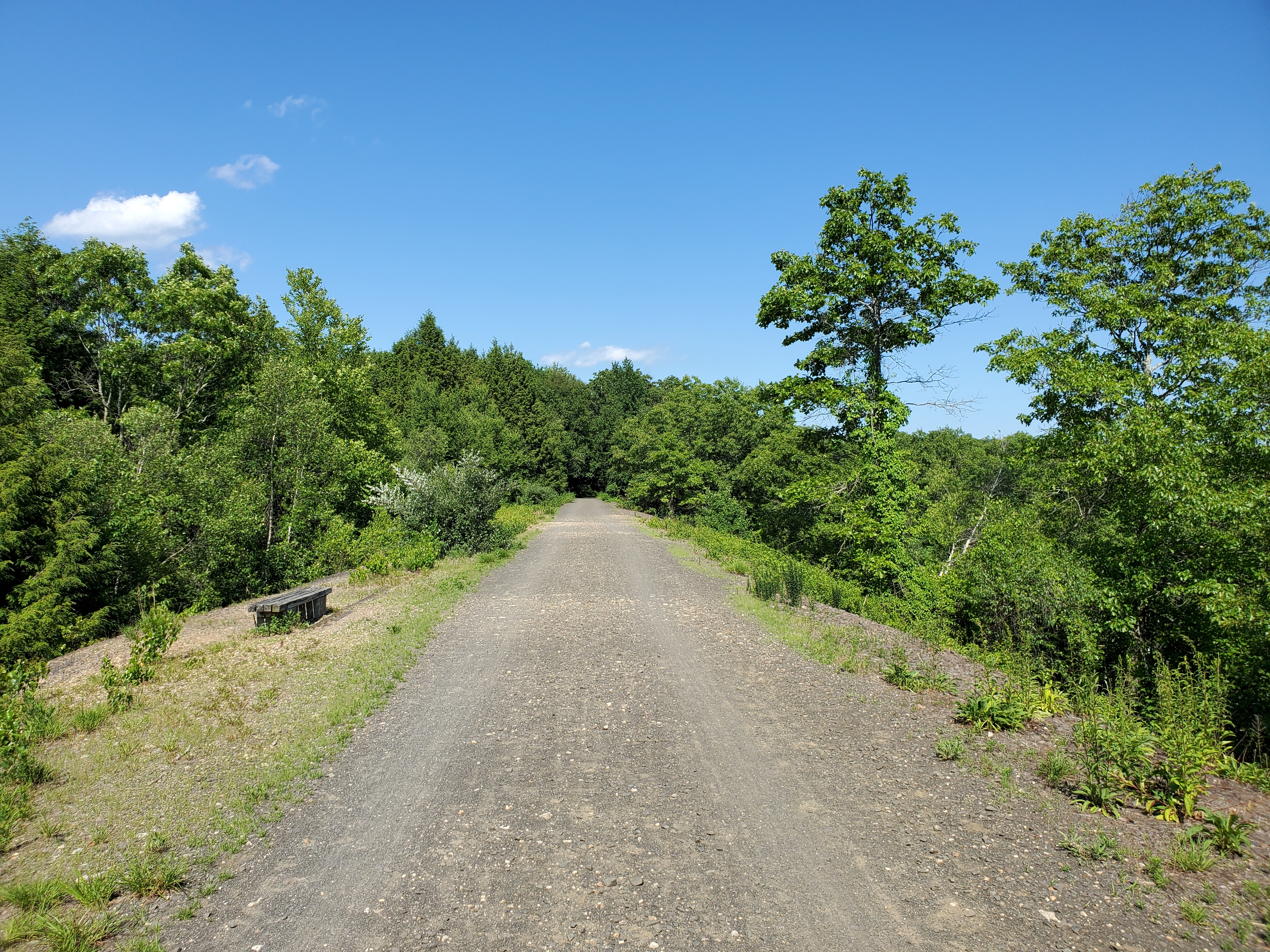
The Air Line Trail on the filled trestle

The Lyman Viaduct is located in a rural setting of northwestern Colchester. Its center is about 0.5 miles (0.80 km) west of Bull Hill Road on the state-maintained Air Line Trail. It is a wrought iron post deck truss design, 1,112 feet (339 m) long with a maximum height of 137 feet (42 m). The structure consists of bents formed out of three quarter-round rolled wrought iron sections, with flanges designed to facilitate riveted assembly. At the stream crossing point, there are four 30-foot (9.1 m) columns. Each tier of the trestle is joined horizontally and laterally to adjacent members. The entire structure is buried in earthen fill and topped by a dense pack of cinder blocks, now somewhat overgrown on the sides.

The bridge was built in 1873 by the Phoenix Iron Works for the Boston and New York Air-Line Railroad, which aimed to provide service between New York City and Boston, Massachusetts, via Middletown, Connecticut. The trestle was one of the largest single capital expenses of the railroad venture, which was beset by cost overruns and failed after just ten years of operation. Taken over by the NYNH&H, the trestle was filled as a comparatively inexpensive means of strengthening the structure for use by heavier equipment in the early 20th century. The line remained in operation into the 1960s, and has since been adapted as the multiuse Air Line Trail by the state.

This trestle and the nearby Rapallo Viaduct, which was similarly buried, were among the world's first examples of wrought iron railroad trestles, and are the only known ones of that period that are believed to be in good condition, due to their entombment. The only earlier known examples of this technology include the Verrugas Bridge in Peru, begun before these, completed in 1873, and washed away in 1889, and the Kinzua Bridge in Pennsylvania, later rebuilt in steel. Because records of its construction are incomplete, forensic analysis of the structure (for example, by excavating a portion of the embankment) is expected to provide significant information about its design and construction, in particular how its construction may have deviated from known plans.

== See also ==
- National Register of Historic Places listings in New London County, Connecticut
- List of bridges on the National Register of Historic Places in Connecticut
