= Rapallo Viaduct =

- U.S. National Register of Historic Places
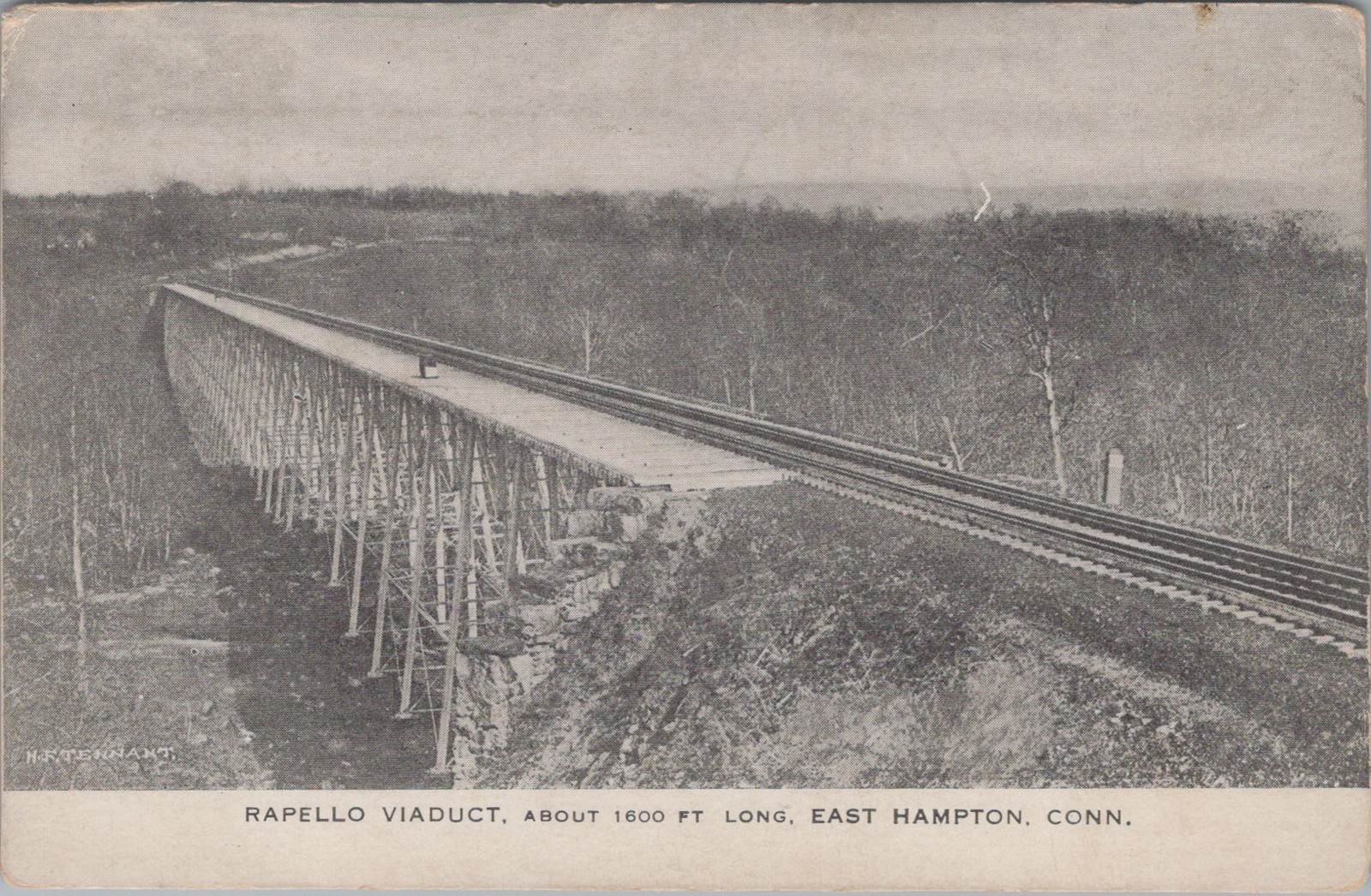
- 1912 postcard of the viaduct

- Location within Connecticut Location within the United States
- Location: Flat Brook and former Air Line Railroad right-of-way, East Hampton, Connecticut
- Coordinates: 41°34′19″N 72°28′19″W
- Area: 1 acre (0.40 ha)
- Built: 1873
- Architect: Edward W. Serrell; Phoenix Iron Works
- NRHP reference No.: 86002728
- Added to NRHP: August 21, 1986

The Rapallo Viaduct is a buried railroad trestle in East Hampton, Connecticut which carries the Air Line Trail across Flat Brook.

== History ==
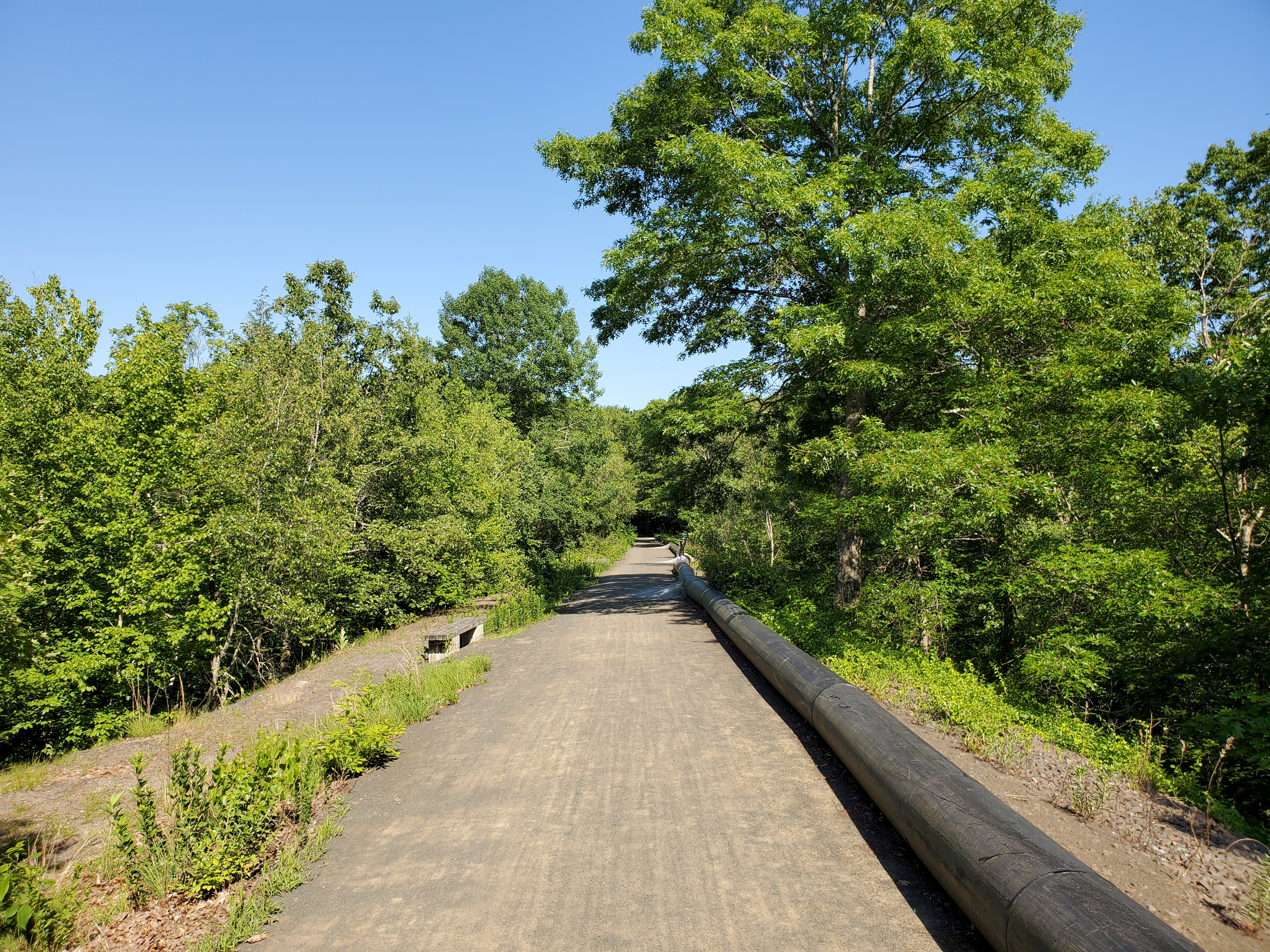
Air Line Trail on the buried viaduct

The viaduct was built as part of the New Haven, Middletown and Willimantic Railroad's line from New Haven to Willimantic, forming part of a more or less direct route between Boston and New York City. The directness of the route required the railroad to cross several deep ravines, including that of Flat Brook, southeast of East Hampton, via high-level bridges; this one would be named after Charles A. Rapallo, one of the railroad's directors. When Edward W. Serrell, then the Chief Engineer of the railroad, set out to design the high iron bridge that would span the valley in about 1870, bridges constructed completely from wrought iron were still a very new technology. Despite Serrell's experience and high reputation as a bridge builder, he was not able to work out precisely what shape the bridge members should take, and their design was subcontracted to the Phoenix Iron Works, which was to build the bridge. While the structure was originally intended to carry a double track, Serrell's apprehensions about the strength of the bridge led him to reduce it to a single track before completion. Serrell was apparently discharged as Chief Engineer by the time of the bridge's completion in 1873, when he wrote to the Connecticut railroad commissioners expressing his apprehension over the design and construction of the iron bridges on the line, including the Rapallo and Lyman Viaducts. The commissioners had the bridges inspected by James Laurie, an eminent civil engineer, who pronounced them fit for use.

Although the New Haven, Middletown and Willimantic was completed in 1873, the Panic of 1873 and the high expenses of construction bankrupted it and forced its reorganization as the Boston and New York Air-Line Railroad in 1875. After a few years of attempted competition, it was leased by the New York, New Haven and Hartford Railroad in 1879, which was the operator of the viaduct thereafter. By the early 20th Century, the iron viaduct's capacity was inadequate for the New Haven's heavier freight trains, and in 1911, the New Haven submitted to the state railroad commissioners a plan to encase Flat Brook in a culvert and fill in the viaduct. The plan was approved, and from 1912 to 1913, sand was dumped from the tracks over the viaduct trestles until it was completely buried. The fill was topped with a layer of cinders, hiding and preserving the viaduct.

Passenger service over the filled viaduct ended by 1937, and the rails were abandoned entirely in 1965. The viaduct was listed on the National Register of Historic Places in 1986, when the abandoned railroad was opened as a rail trail.

The viaduct is still covered in fill, although its largely intact condition was verified in 1979 when a sewer line was buried in the fill. Part of the culvert collapsed in 2007, but was repaired and the fill restored that year. The fill covering it protected it where other iron bridges in the state have been demolished, so that the Rapallo and Lyman viaducts are the only surviving bridges in the state from the first generation of wrought iron bridge construction.

== See also ==
- National Register of Historic Places listings in Middlesex County, Connecticut
- List of bridges on the National Register of Historic Places in Connecticut
