= Connecticut Route 200 =

State highway in Windham County, Connecticut, US

Route 200
- Map of Windham County in northeastern Connecticut with Route 200 highlighted in red

Route information
- Maintained by CTDOT
- Length: 1.87 mi (3.01 km)
- Existed: 1932–present

Major junctions
- West end: Route 12 in Thompson
- I-395 in Thompson
- East end: Route 193 in Thompson

Location
- Country: United States
- State: Connecticut
- Counties: Windham

Highway system
- Connecticut State Highway System; Interstate; US; State; SSR; SR; Scenic
← Route 199	→ Route 201

Route 200 is a state highway in northeastern Connecticut, running entirely within Thompson. It connects the town center to I-395.

== Route description ==
Route 200 begins at an intersection with Route 12 within the town of Thompson. It heads east and southeast, intersecting I-395 at Exit 50 about 1.1 miles (1.8 km) later. It then continues on its southeast track until it ends at an intersection with Route 193 in Thompson center.

== History ==
Most of modern Route 200 was part of the Thompson Turnpike, which was part of a route between Providence and Springfield. In 1922, Route 200 and the piece of modern Route 193 between Route 12 and Thompson center, was designated as State Highway 185, a loop route of New England Route 12 to serve Thompson center. Modern Route 200 was established as part of the 1932 state highway renumbering, and originally extended southeast of Thompson center along Quaddick Road to the village of Quaddick. As part of the 1962 Route Reclassification Act, Route 200 was truncated to end at Route 193 in Thompson center. In the late 1960s, an interchange with I-395 (then Route 52) was constructed.

== Junction list ==
The entire route is in Thompson, Windham County.

mi	km	Destinations	Notes
0.00	0.00	Route 12 – Webster, MA, Putnam	Western terminus
1.16	1.87	I-395 – Norwich, Worcester, MA	Exit 50 on I-395; former Route 52
1.87	3.01	Route 193 – Mechanicsville, Webster, MA	Eastern terminus
1.000 mi = 1.609 km; 1.000 km = 0.621 mi
