= Cady-Copp House =

Historic house in Connecticut, United States

- U.S. National Register of Historic Places
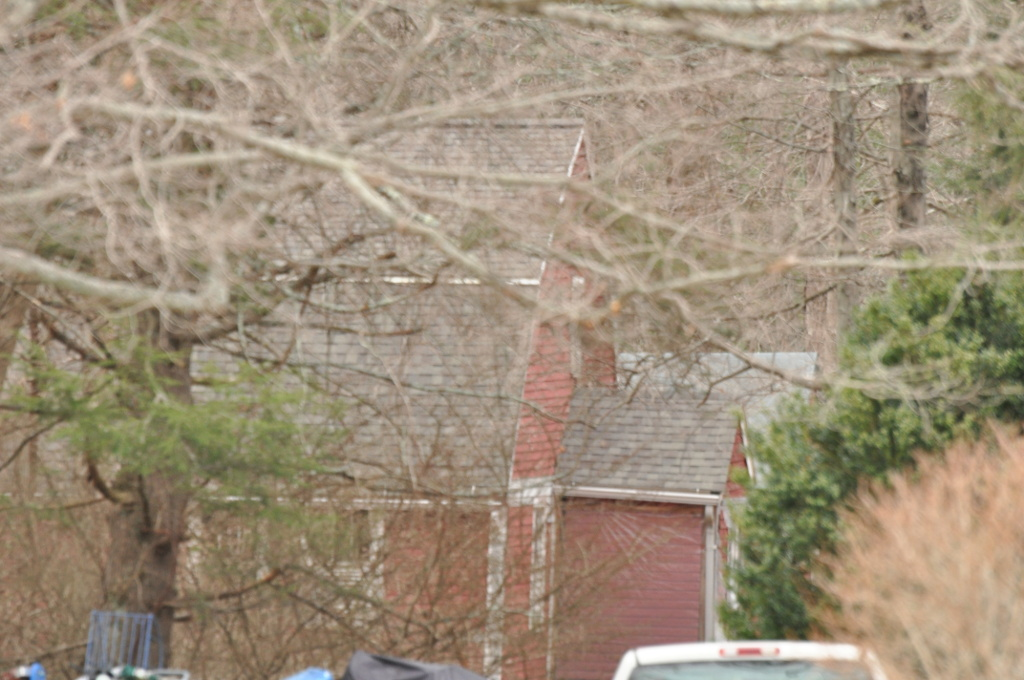

- Location within Connecticut Location within the United States
- Location: 115 Liberty Highway, Putnam, Connecticut
- Coordinates: 41°53′46″N 71°52′0″W
- Area: 1 acre (0.40 ha)
- Built: 1745
- Architectural style: Colonial
- NRHP reference No.: 01000939
- Added to NRHP: September 3, 2001

The Cady-Copp House is an historic house at 115 Liberty Highway in Putnam, Connecticut. Built about 1745 and little altered since, it is an important regional example of vernacular colonial architecture. It was listed on the National Register of Historic Places in 2001.

== Description and history ==
The Cady-Copp House stands in the dispersed village of Putnam Heights, on the east side of Liberty Highway (Connecticut Route 21), roughly midway between Wilson Road and Aspinock Road. It is a 1 1/2-story wood-frame structure, with a gambrel roof and a center chimney. It is set in a wooded area back from the highway, and faces south. The interior is virtually unaltered since its c. 1745 construction, lacking any provision of modern amenities such as plumbing and electricity. The front facade is irregular in arrangement, with an entrance on the right side, flanked closely by sash windows. A third sash window is roughly centered in the left half of the front. The left side has a second entrance, set in a gabled vestibule.

The Putnam Heights area was settled in 1708. Its first minister was dismissed in 1741, and a second was appointed in 1750. Sometime between these two dates, the Cady-Copp House was built by Joseph Cady for his daughter Damaris, who was marrying the Perley Howe, the second minister. After he died, she remarried the next minister. Damaris's son Sampson Howe sold the property to David Copp, whose family maintained ownership until the late 19th century. In 1992 it was given to the local historical society.

== See also ==
- National Register of Historic Places listings in Windham County, Connecticut
