= Richard Normand Langlois =

American economist (born 1952)

Richard Normand Langlois (born January 20, 1952, in Putnam, Connecticut) is an American economist and professor at the University of Connecticut. His research focuses on the economics of organizations and institutions, business history, technological change, and the evolution of industrial organization. He has written on the development of the computer, semiconductor, and software industries, the organization of firms, and the relationship between markets, institutions, and technological innovation. He is known for his work on dynamic transaction costs, modular systems, and the changing structure of large corporations. He has been head of the Department of Economics at the University of Connecticut since January 2024 and president of the World Interdisciplinary Network for Institutional Research since March 2024.

== Education ==
Langlois received a Bachelor of Arts degree in physics and English literature from Williams College in 1974, graduating with honors in physics and highest honors in English literature. He earned a Master of Science in astronomy from Yale University in 1975 and another master's degree in engineering-economic systems from Stanford University in 1976. He completed a PhD in Engineering-Economic Systems at Stanford in 1981.

== Literature ==
- 1982, Subjective Probability and Subjective Economics. New York : NY, C.V. Starr Center for Applied Economics, NYU, FAS, Department of Economics, Working Paper
- 1984, Kaleidic and Structural Interpretations of Genuine Uncertainty. New York : NY, C.V. Starr Center for Applied Economics, NYU, FAS, Department of Economics, Working Paper
- 1986, Economics as a Process: Essays in the New Institutional Economics. New York: Cambridge University Press, 1986. xi, 262 p. : ill.; 24 cm. ISBN 0-521-30174-2
- 1988, “Economic change and the boundaries of the firm,” Journal of Institutional and Theoretical Economics, vol. 144, pp. 635–57
- 1994, “Risk and Uncertainty” in Peter Boettke (ed.), The Elgar Companion to Austrian Economics. Brookfield, Vermont : Edward Elgar Publishing, pp. 118–22.
- 1995, Firms, markets, and economic change : a dynamic theory of business institutions / Richard N. Langlois and Paul L. Robertson. London; New York : Routledge, 1995. xii, 185 p. : ill.; 24 cm. ISBN 0-415-12119-1 (hbk.), ISBN 0-415-12385-2 (pbk.)
- 1998, “Capabilities and the theory of the firm,” in N. J. Foss and B. J. Loasby (eds.), Economic Organisation, Capabilities and Co-ordination. London: Routledge.
- 2007, The dynamics of industrial capitalism : Schumpeter, Chandler, and the new economy / Richard N. Langlois. Abingdon [England]; New York, NY : Routledge, 2007. ISBN 978-0-415-77167-2
- 2023, The Corporation and the Twentieth Century: The History of American Business Enterprise. Princeton University Press. ISBN 978-0-691-24698-7
