= Connecticut Route 21 =

State highway in Windham County, Connecticut, US

Route 21
- Map of Windham County in northeastern Connecticut with Route 21 highlighted in red

Route information
- Maintained by CTDOT
- Length: 5.67 mi (9.12 km)
- Existed: 1944–present

Major junctions
- South end: Route 12 in Killingly
- US 44 in East Putnam
- North end: Route 193 in Thompson

Location
- Country: United States
- State: Connecticut
- Counties: Windham

Highway system
- Connecticut State Highway System; Interstate; US; State; SSR; SR; Scenic
← Route 20	→ Route 22

Route 21 is a 5.67-mile (9.12 km) state highway in rural northeastern Connecticut. It extends from Route 12 in Killingly to Route 193 in Thompson. It serves as an alternate to Route 12 in the town of Putnam.

== Route description ==
Route 21 begins as Thompson Pike at an intersection with Route 12 in northern Killingly and heads north towards the town of Putnam. It crosses into the village of Putnam Heights in the town of Putnam about 0.9 miles (1.4 km) later, becoming known as Liberty Highway. Route 21 runs through the rural areas of Putnam as it heads north towards the town of Thompson. Route 21 intersects with US 44 about 2.6 miles (4.2 km) north of Putnam Heights then enters Thompson after another 0.4 miles (0.64 km). In Thompson, Route 21 becomes known as County Home Road. It passes by the Quinnatisset Country Club, crossing over the Quinnatisset Brook along the way. Route 21 ends a mile later at an intersection with Route 193 in Thompson center. Route 21 is two lanes wide and is classified as a collector road for its entire length. It carries traffic volumes of up to 2,100 per day.

== History ==
Route 21 was established in 1944 between US 44 and Route 12 to serve the village of Putnam Heights. It was extended north from US 44 to Route 193 in 1957 to provide access to the Quinnatisset Country Club.

== Junction list ==
The entire route is in Windham County.

Location	mi	km	Destinations	Notes
Killingly	0.00	0.00	Route 12	Southern terminus
Putnam	3.75	6.04	US 44 – East Putnam, Putnam	
Thompson	5.67	9.12	Route 193 – Putnam, Thompson, Worcester, MA	Northern terminus
1.000 mi = 1.609 km; 1.000 km = 0.621 mi
