= Tom Baril =

American photographer (born 1952)

- Born: 1952 (age 73–74); Putnam, Connecticut, U.S.
- Education: School of Visual Arts (BFA, 1980)
- Known for: Photography
- Website: tombaril.net

Tom Baril (born 1952) is an American photographer known for his photographs of flowers, landscapes, and architecture. Based in New York, he creates work characterized by textural detail and soft focus, often using a handmade pinhole camera.

He worked for a decade as Robert Mapplethorpe's printer, developing technical printing skills, before establishing himself as an independent artist.

== Early life and education ==
Baril was born in Putnam, Connecticut and earned a Bachelor of Fine Arts in photography from the School of Visual Arts in New York City in 1980.

== Career ==
In 1979, while still a student at the School of Visual Arts, Baril turned to printing to support his photography career and was hired as Robert Mapplethorpe's printer. The working relationship lasted 10 years. Mapplethorpe confined Baril to the darkroom, communicated with him through third parties, and often paid him late, but Baril stayed on. During this period, Baril's own photography was overshadowed by Mapplethorpe's, and he essentially paused his career.

Baril's technical skill was widely recognized, and Mapplethorpe was praised for the quality of the printing. Mapplethorpe's aesthetic demands were specific: he wanted "everything to look beautiful", whether flowers, faces, or figure studies. Baril and Mapplethorpe connected over their shared appreciation of classical tradition.

After leaving Mapplethorpe's employ, Baril concentrated on his own photography, but continued to print in Mapplethorpe's original darkroom, later part of the Mapplethorpe Foundation.

Gallerist David Fahey introduced 4AD owner Ivo Watts-Russell to Baril's work, which led to 4AD's publishing Baril's first monograph in 1997. The initial printing of 2,500 copies sold out immediately, and instantly boosted Baril's career. Despite its popularity, the book was not financially successful due to its expensive hand-binding and specialized printing process.

In 1998, Baril was described as "one of the hottest contemporary fine-art photographers".

== Work ==
Alpine Poppies (1998), from Botanica (Arena Editions, 2000)

Baril primarily photographs three subjects: flowers, landscapes, and architecture, including such industrial subjects as the Brooklyn Bridge, the Verrazzano–Narrows Bridge, and steel mills. His work has been described as "quietly contemplative" in contrast to Mapplethorpe's "loudly transgressive" images.

In 1994, Baril began working with pinhole photography, using a 4×5 view camera and Polaroid Type 55 film, which creates both a print and a reusable negative.

Baril's printing technique uses selenium toner, followed by a tea bath, to give the prints warmer, deeper tones. He specifically uses Lipton tea. He often leaves the raw marks from Polaroid separation around the edges of his prints. Baril also uses solarization, exposing film to light while still developing. This process creates bubbles and streaks that he uses to advantage, giving his prints "an occasional painterliness".

== Collections ==
Baril's work is in the following public collections:

- Bell Gallery, Brown University
- Benton Museum of Art, University of Connecticut
- Bibliothèque nationale de France, Paris
- Brooklyn Museum, New York
- Delaware Art Museum, Wilmington
- Harvard Art Museums, Cambridge, Massachusetts
- Philadelphia Museum of Art, Philadelphia

== Publications ==
- Tom Baril (1997). 4AD. ISBN 978-0-9657450-0-0.
- Botanica (2000). Arena Editions. ISBN 978-1-892041-20-3.
