= Putnam, Connecticut =

- Town
- Town of Putnam
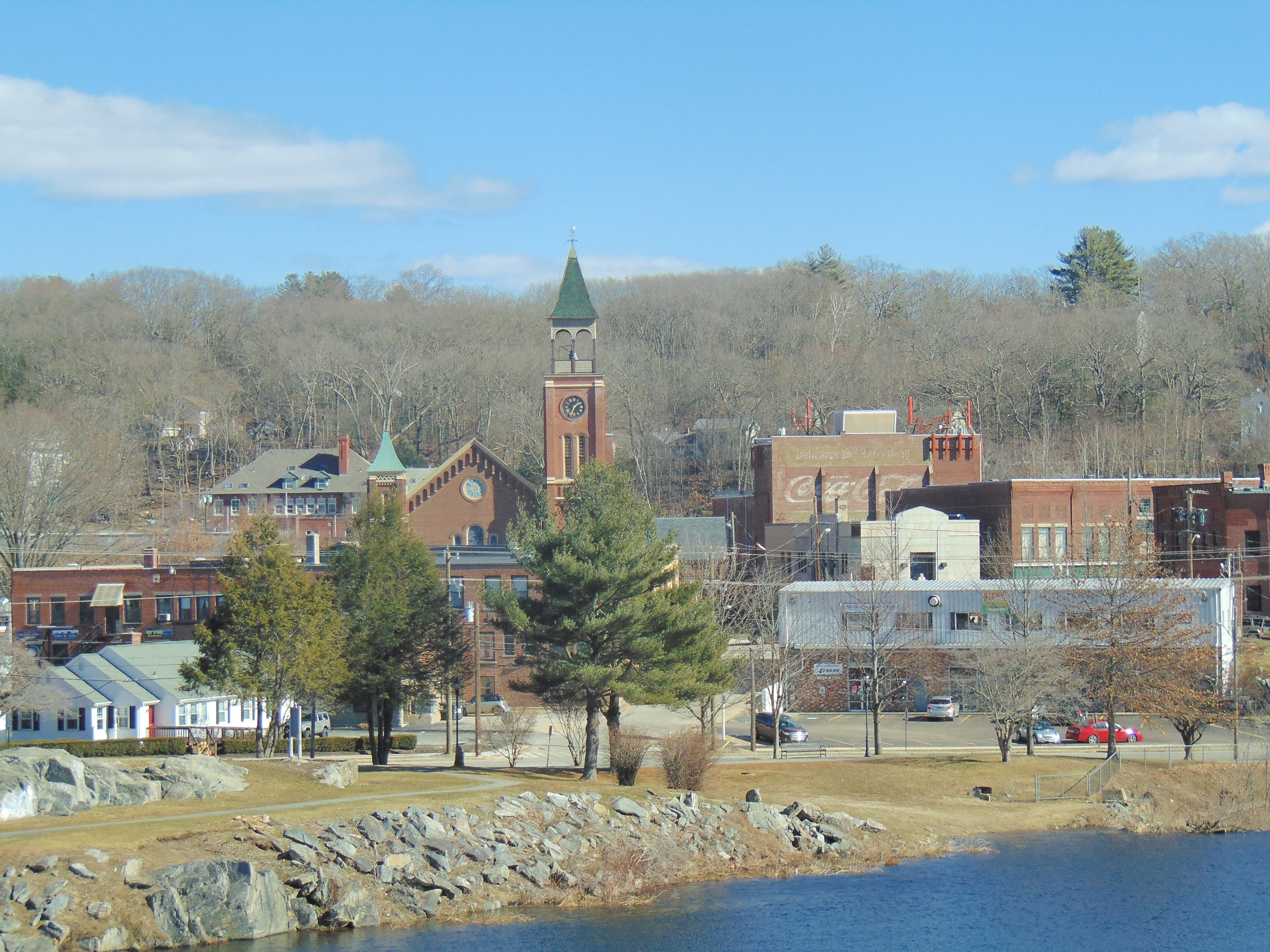
- The center of Putnam

- Seal

- Coordinates: 41°54′22″N 71°52′13″W
- Country: United States
- U.S. state: Connecticut
- County: Windham
- Region: Northeastern CT
- Incorporated: 1855

Government
  - Type: Selectman-Town Meeting
  - Mayor: Barney Seney (I)
  - State Senator: Mae Flexer (D-29th District)
  - State Rep.: Chris Stewart (R-51st District)

Area
  - Total: 20.4 sq mi (52.8 km^{2})
  - Land: 20.3 sq mi (52.6 km^{2})
  - Water: 0.12 sq mi (0.3 km^{2})
- Elevation: 410 ft (125 m)

Population (2020)
  - Total: 9,224
  - Density: 454/sq mi (175.4/km^{2})
- Time zone: UTC−5 (Eastern)
  - Summer (DST): UTC−4 (Eastern)
- ZIP code: 06260
- Area codes: 860/959
- FIPS code: 09-62710
- GNIS feature ID: 0213494
- Website: http://www.putnamct.us/

Putnam is a town in Windham County, Connecticut. Putnam is part of the Northeastern Connecticut Planning Region. The population was 9,924 at the 2020 census.

== History ==
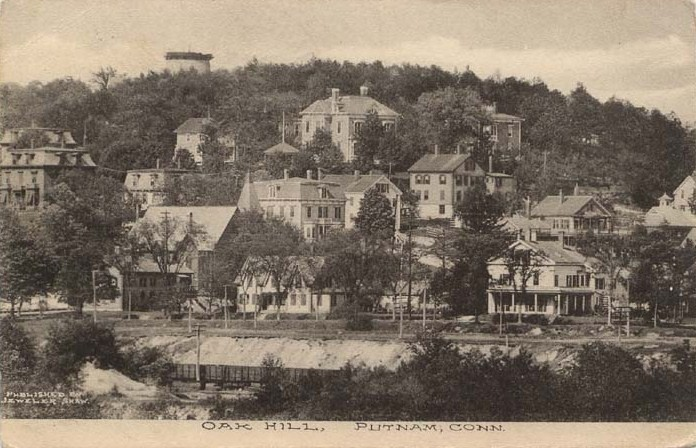
Oak Hill c. 1911

Putnam, originally known as Aspinock, then part of Killingly, is a New England mill town incorporated in 1855. Created from sections of Killingly, Pomfret, and Thompson, the town was named in honor of Revolutionary War General Israel Putnam.

Putnam was a key contributor in providing clothing and other goods to the Civil War soldiers. There were numerous mills and a train ran through the town, providing transportation for the goods being produced.

On August 19, 1955, Putnam was devastated by floods from torrential downpours caused by two hurricanes, which hit Connecticut within the span of a week. Hurricane Connie affected Connecticut on August 13, dropping between four and six inches (152 mm) of rain across the state. Hurricane Diane soaked the state with 14 inches (360 mm) of rain on August 18–19. The result was flooding in many of the state's rivers, including the Quinebaug River. The resulting torrent of water destroyed homes, businesses and factories. Floating magnesium barrels burst, lighting up the night. The railroad bed was washed away.

Toward the end of the twentieth century, the town took advantage of the empty mills and underutilized downtown commercial buildings to develop a large antique center. Antique shops lined Main Street and other areas in town. Beginning in the early 2000s, many of the antique stores begun to close and were replaced by restaurants, small shops, and a vibrant arts community.

Putnam was also the unlikely base of operations for the All-Russian Fascist Organization, a pre-war Russian emigre group that advocated fascism for the country under Anastasy Vonsiatsky.

== Geography ==
According to the United States Census Bureau, the town has a total area of 20.4 square miles (52.8 km^{2}), of which, 20.3 square miles (52.6 km^{2}) are land and 0.1 square mile (0.3 km^{2}) (0.54%) is water. The town is drained by the Quinebaug River, which runs north and south through the center of town. A tributary of the Quinebaug, the Five Mile River, runs north and south through East Putnam. Putnam has common boundaries with Thompson on the north (approx. 6 mi.), with Rhode Island on the east (approx. 2 mi.), with Killingly on the south (approx. 7 mi.) and with Pomfret and Woodstock on the west (approx. 4 mi.).

The town is crossed by Interstate 395, U.S. Route 44, Connecticut Route 12, Connecticut Route 21 and Connecticut Route 171.

== Principal communities ==
- Putnam District
- Putnam Heights
- East Putnam

== Demographics ==
Historical population
| Census | Pop. | Note | %± |
|---|---|---|---|
| 1860 | 2,722 | | — |
| 1870 | 4,192 | | 54.0% |
| 1880 | 5,827 | | 39.0% |
| 1890 | 6,512 | | 11.8% |
| 1900 | 7,348 | | 12.8% |
| 1910 | 7,280 | | −0.9% |
| 1920 | 8,397 | | 15.3% |
| 1930 | 8,099 | | −3.5% |
| 1940 | 8,692 | | 7.3% |
| 1950 | 9,304 | | 7.0% |
| 1960 | 8,412 | | −9.6% |
| 1970 | 8,598 | | 2.2% |
| 1980 | 8,580 | | −0.2% |
| 1990 | 9,031 | | 5.3% |
| 2000 | 9,002 | | −0.3% |
| 2010 | 9,584 | | 6.5% |
| 2020 | 9,224 | | −3.8% |
U.S. Decennial Census

As of the 2010 census, there were 9,584 people, 3,950 households, and 2,396 families residing in the town. The population density was 472.1 inhabitants per square mile (182.3/km^{2}). There were 4,299 housing units at an average density of 211.8 per square mile (81.8/km^{2}). The racial makeup of the town was 94.1% White, 1.3% African American, 0.6% Native American, 1.0% Asian, 0.0% Pacific Islander, 0.6% from other races, and 2.3% from two or more races. Hispanic or Latino of any race were 2.9% of the population.

Of the 3,950 households, 25.9% had children under the age of 18 living with them, 41.7% were married couples living together, 13.3% had a female householder with no husband present, and 39.3% were non-families. 30.9% of all households were made up of individuals, and 12.3% had someone living alone who was 65 years of age or older. The average household size was 2.33 and the average family size was 2.89.

In the town, the population was spread out, with 22.1% under the age of 18, 8.3% from 18 to 24, 26.4% from 25 to 44, 28.2% from 45 to 64, and 15.0% who were 65 years of age or older. The median age was 39.9 years old.

The median income for a household in the town was $51,171 and the median income for a family was $63,030. Males had a median income of $51,586 versus $44,901 for females. The per capita income for the town was $26,994. About 10.6% of families and 15.4% of the population were below the poverty line, including 19.6% of those under age 18 and 10.5% of those age 65 or over.

== Arts and culture ==
Putnam District or "Historic Downtown" is home to many arts events and businesses. Aligning Main Street, which runs through the center of Downtown, there are over seven arts-related businesses in just one block of the town. In 2010, a small group of local business owners started First Friday Putnam, a monthly arts-based event running from March to October.

Putnam is home to WINY, an AM and FM radio station.

=== Bradley Playhouse ===
Originally called the Bradley Theatre, the Bradley Playhouse was completed on January 29, 1901. In 1914, the playhouse suffered a series of fires, and upon remodeling changed the interior to better showcase movies, as they were of increased popularity at the time. In 1984, the Northeast Repertory Theatre was formed, bringing live performance back to the Bradley.

== Historic pictures ==
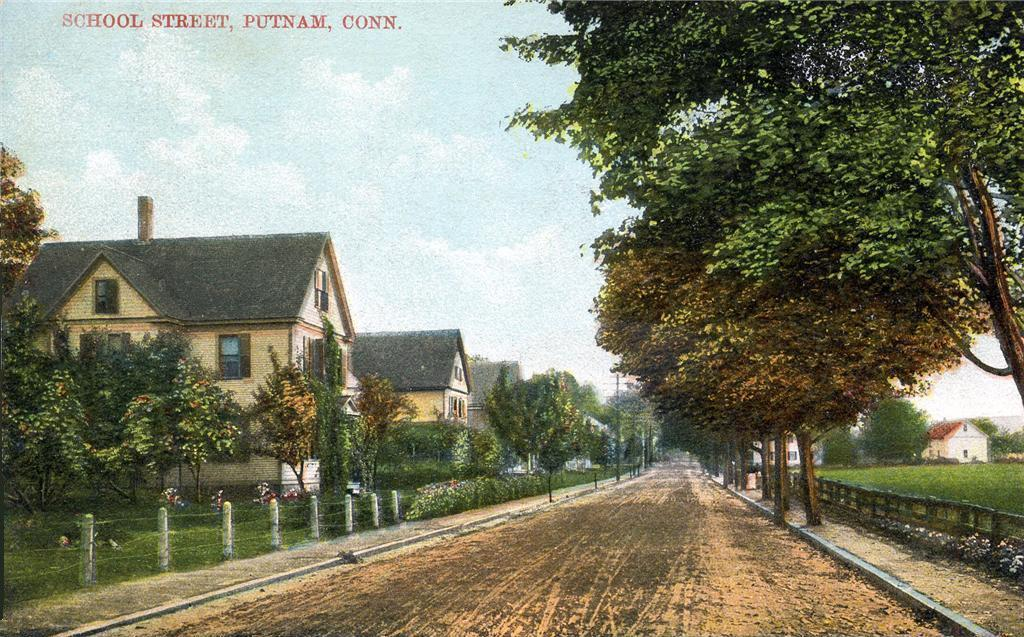
School Street c. 1910

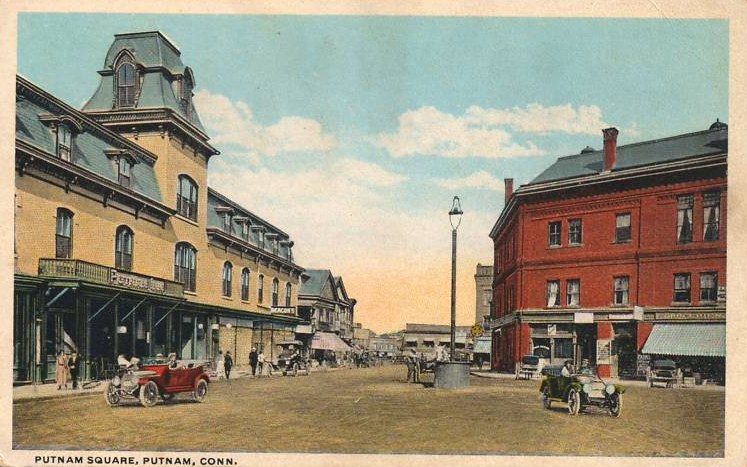
Putnam Square, c. 1915

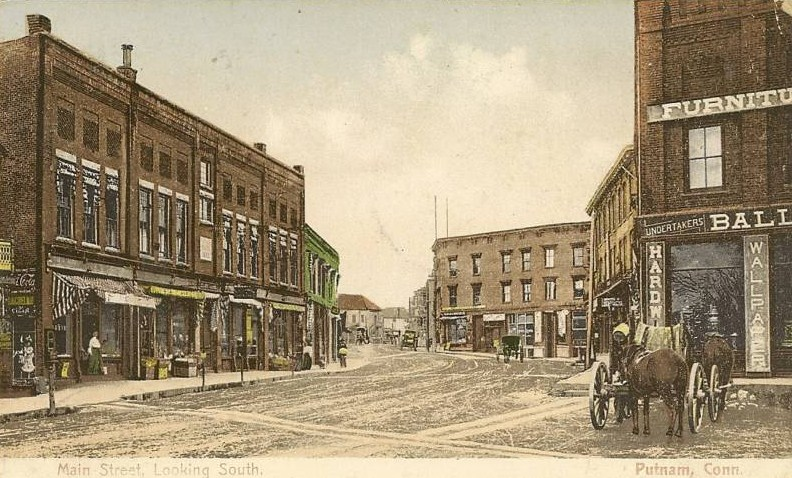
Main Street, looking south, c. 1908

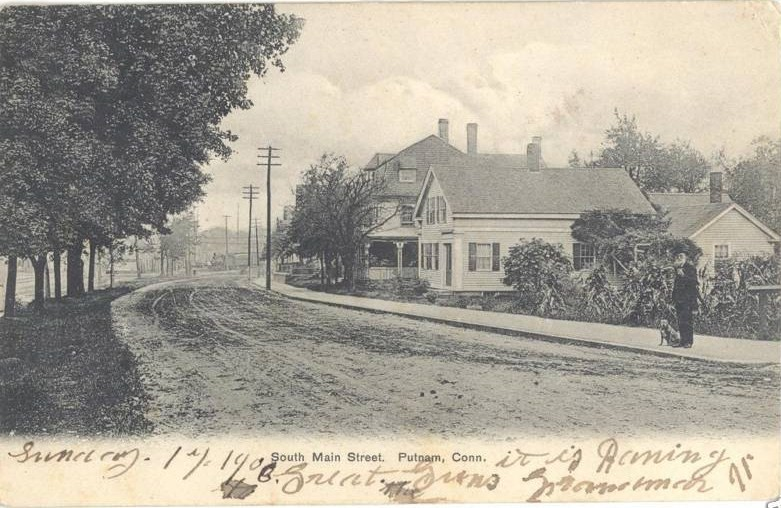
South Main Street c. 1906

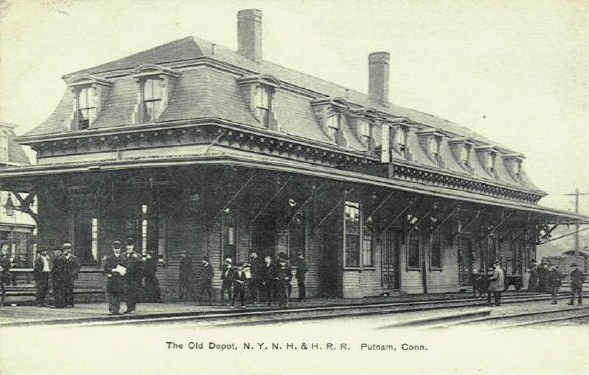
"Old" railroad depot, 1906

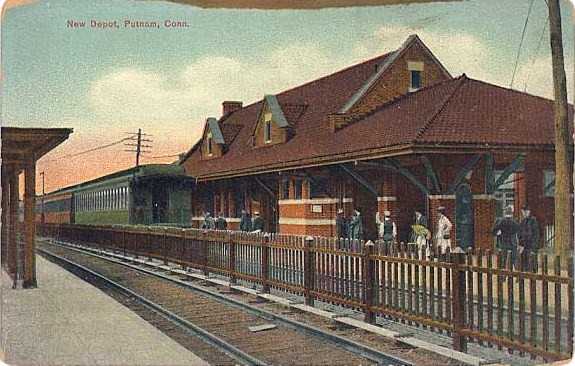
"New" train station, c. 1906

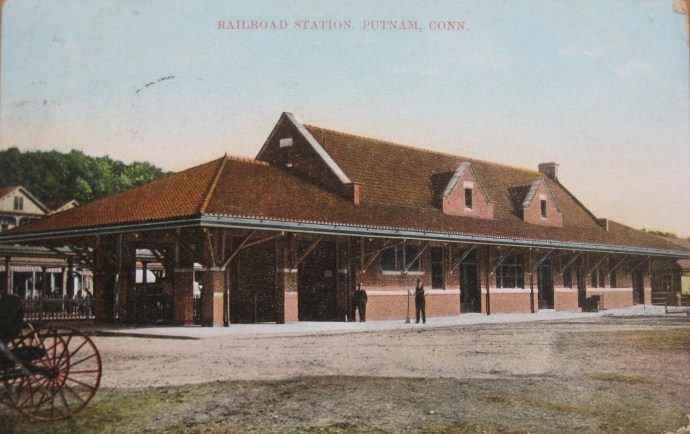
The station in 1914

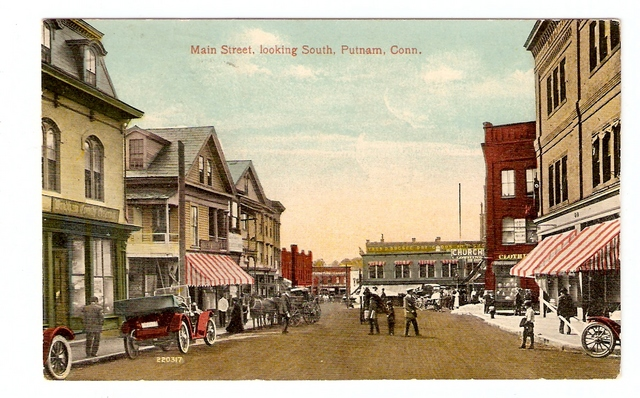
Main St. c. 1915

== Schools ==
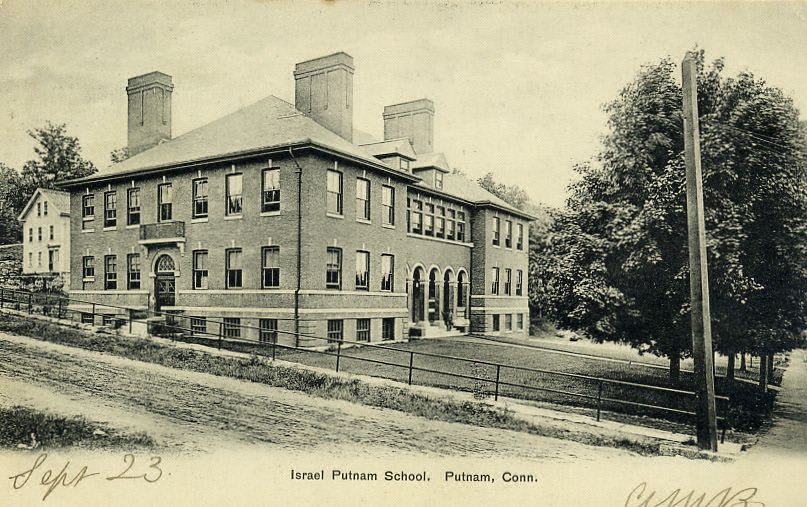
Israel Putnam School, c. 1907

- Public
  - Putnam Elementary School – K–5th grade
  - Putnam Middle School – 6th–8th grade
  - Putnam High School – 9th–12th grade
- Private
  - Putnam Science Academy – Private school for students in Grades 9–12 wanting to further their education in the world of science.
  - Tri-State Christian Academy (grades K–8)

=== Notable achievements ===
- Putnam Science Academy has entered and won the Connecticut Science Olympiad for four years in a row (2004–2005, 2005–2006, 2006–2007, and 2007–2008).
- Putnam was also featured in a mid-1970s summer game show on ABC, "Almost Anything Goes", where teams from towns under 20,000 were invited to compete.

== Transportation ==
Putnam is served by the Northeastern Connecticut Transit District.

== Notable locations ==
- Cady-Copp House – historic home at 115 Liberty Highway and added to the National Register of Historic Places in 2001.
- Putnam Town Hall – historic building on 126 Church Street and added to the National Register of Historic Places in 1993.
- Putnam Railroad Station – historic train station at 35 and 45-47 Main Street and added to the National Register of Historic Places in 2007.

== Notable people ==
- Tom Baril (born 1952), photographer
- Bruce Boisclair (born 1952), baseball outfielder
- Henry Breault (1900–1941), Medal of Honor recipient
- Brooke Brodack (born 1986), viral video comedian
- Lewis C. Carpenter (1836–1908), congressman from South Carolina
- John N. Dempsey (1915–1989), Mayor of Putnam, Governor of Connecticut
- Norman Dike (1918-1989) Commander of Easy Co. 2nd Bn 506th PIR during the Battle of the Bulge
- Candy LaChance (1870–1932), baseball first baseman
- Richard Normand Langlois (born 1952), economist and professor
- William St. Onge (1914–1970), congressman
- Michael Bruce Ross (1959–2005), serial killer
- Bob Schaefer (born 1944), baseball coach
- Rollie Sheldon (born 1936), baseball pitcher
- Gertrude Chandler Warner (1890–1979), children's author

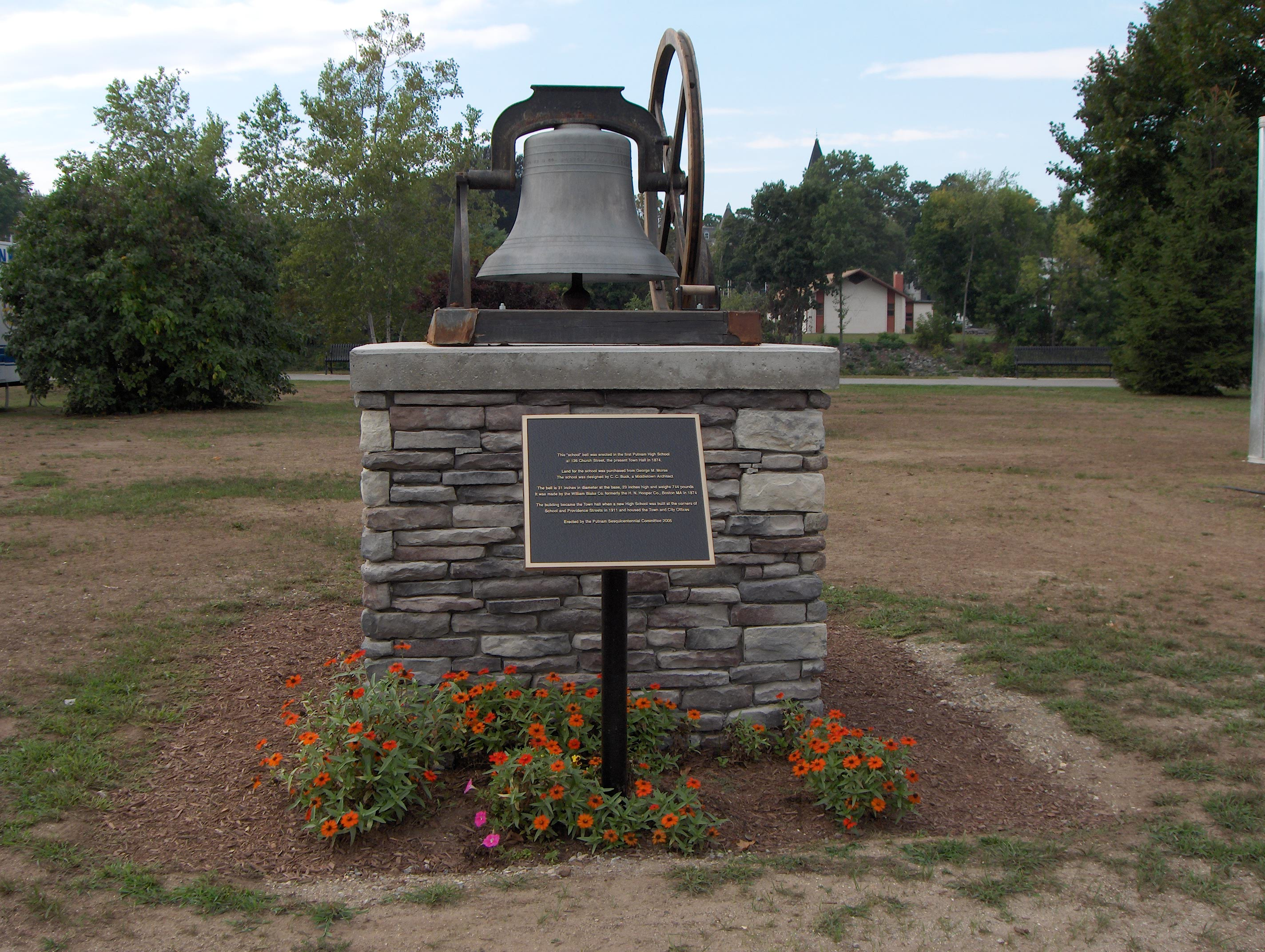
Putnam Town Hall bell, now in Rotary Park
