= Boston and New York Air-Line Railroad =

Defunct railroad in Connecticut

- The completed extent of the New Haven, Middletown and Willimantic Railroad
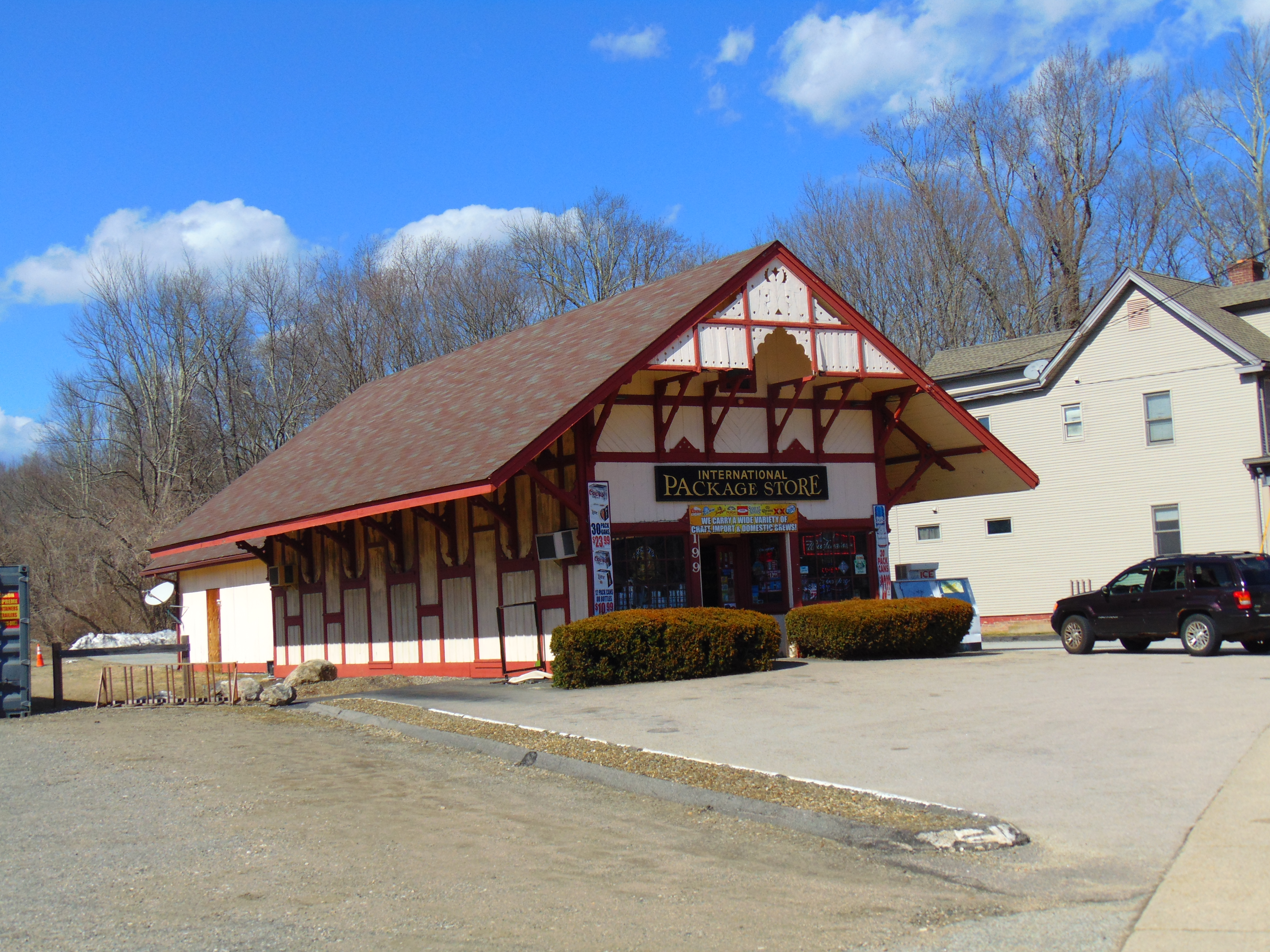
- The station in Colchester, Connecticut formerly used by the Air-Line

Overview
- Current operator: Providence and Worcester Railroad
- Dates of operation: 1870–1882
- Successor: New York, New Haven and Hartford Railroad

Technical
- Track gauge: 4 ft 8 1/2 in (1,435 mm) standard gauge
- Length: 54.1 miles (87.1 km)

The Boston and New York Air-Line Railroad (commonly known simply as The Air Line, known as the New Haven, Middletown and Willimantic Railroad before 1875) was a railroad in Connecticut. Envisioned as a direct route between New Haven and Boston, it was hampered by difficult terrain in eastern Connecticut and did not find much success. The New York, New Haven and Hartford Railroad leased the company in 1882. The tracks between Portland, Connecticut and Willimantic, Connecticut were abandoned in 1965, while the remainder of the line is operated by the Providence and Worcester Railroad.

== History ==
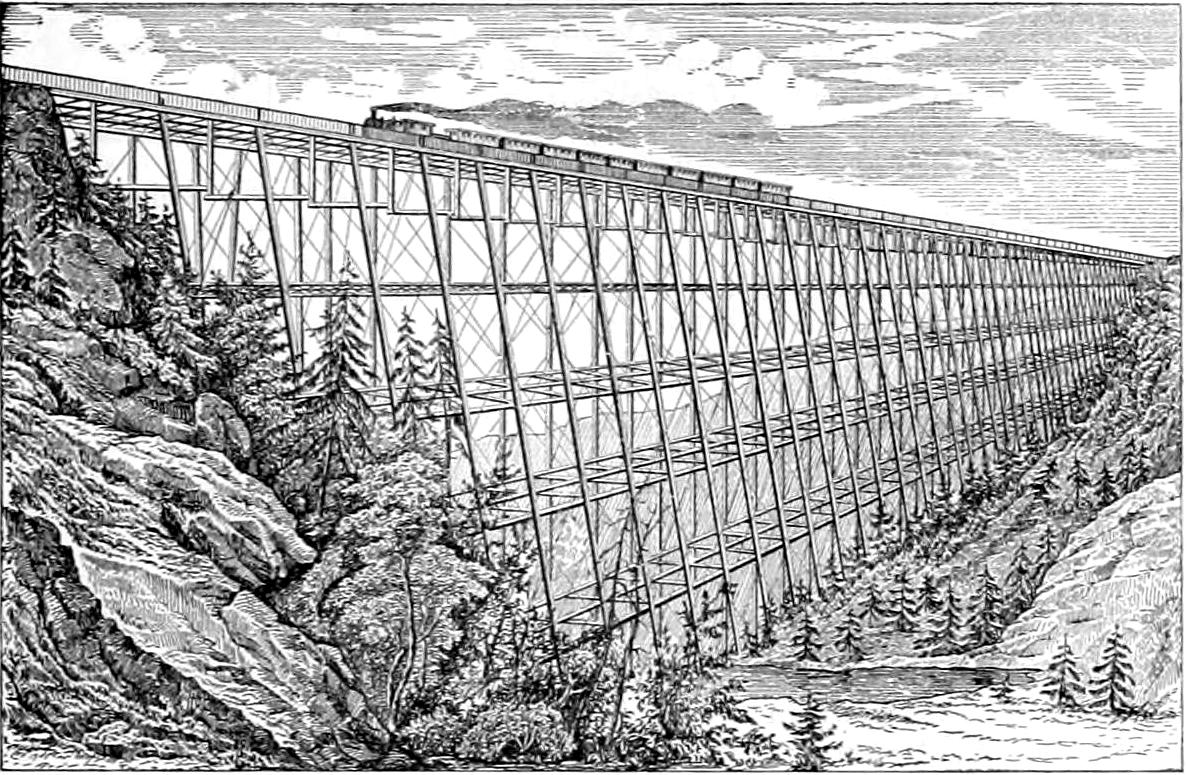
1876 drawing of the Lyman Viaduct

The first attempt to build an air-line railroad connecting New Haven and Boston began in 1846, with the chartering of the New York and Boston Railroad Company. The railroad began building from New Haven in 1853, but construction quickly stalled and the company failed during the Panic of 1857. In 1867, a group of investors decided to try again, chartering the New Haven, Middletown and Willimantic Railroad Company. Starting from New Haven, service to Middletown commenced in 1870, while construction between Middletown and Willimantic was completed in 1873. Debt from construction brought the railroad into bankruptcy in 1875; it emerged under the new name Boston and New York Air-Line Railroad.

The Air-Line Railroad was leased by the rapidly growing New York, New Haven and Hartford Railroad in 1882. The tracks between Portland, Connecticut and Willimantic, Connecticut were abandoned in 1965, while the remainder of the line is operated by the Providence and Worcester Railroad. The eastern section of the line is now part of the Air Line State Park Trail.

== Station listing ==
Location	Station	Miles (km)	Connecting lines
New Haven	New Haven	0.0 (0.0)	New Haven Line, New Haven and Derby Railroad, Canal Line, Shore Line, New Haven–Springfield Line
New Haven	Cedar Hill	1.7 (2.7)	Shore Line, New Haven–Springfield Line
North Haven	Montowese	4.9 (7.9)	
North Haven	Northford	8.2 (13.3)	
Wallingford	East Wallingford	12.5 (20.1)	
Middlefield	Middlefield & Durham	18.6 (29.9)	
Middlefield	Middlefield Center	19.5 (31.4)	
Middlefield	Rockfall	21.0 (33.9)	
Middletown	Middletown	24.4 (39.3)	Valley Line, Middletown Branch
East Hampton	Cobalt & Middle Haddam	30.1 (48.5)	
East Hampton	East Hampton	33.2 (53.5)	
Colchester	Lyman Viaduct	37.0 (59.5)	
Colchester	Westchester	39.8 (64.0)	
Colchester	Amston (Turnerville)	44.2 (71.1)	Colchester Branch
Lebanon	Leonard's Bridge	47.1 (75.8)	
Columbia	Chestnut Hill	49.5 (79.7)	
Willimantic	Willimantic	54.1 (87.0)	New York and New England Railroad, Central Vermont Railway

The 3.6-mile (5.8 km) branch from Amston to Colchester had no intermediate stations.
