= North Grosvenordale =

Census-designated place in Connecticut, United States

- North Grosvenordale Mill Historic District
- U.S. National Register of Historic Places
- U.S. Historic district
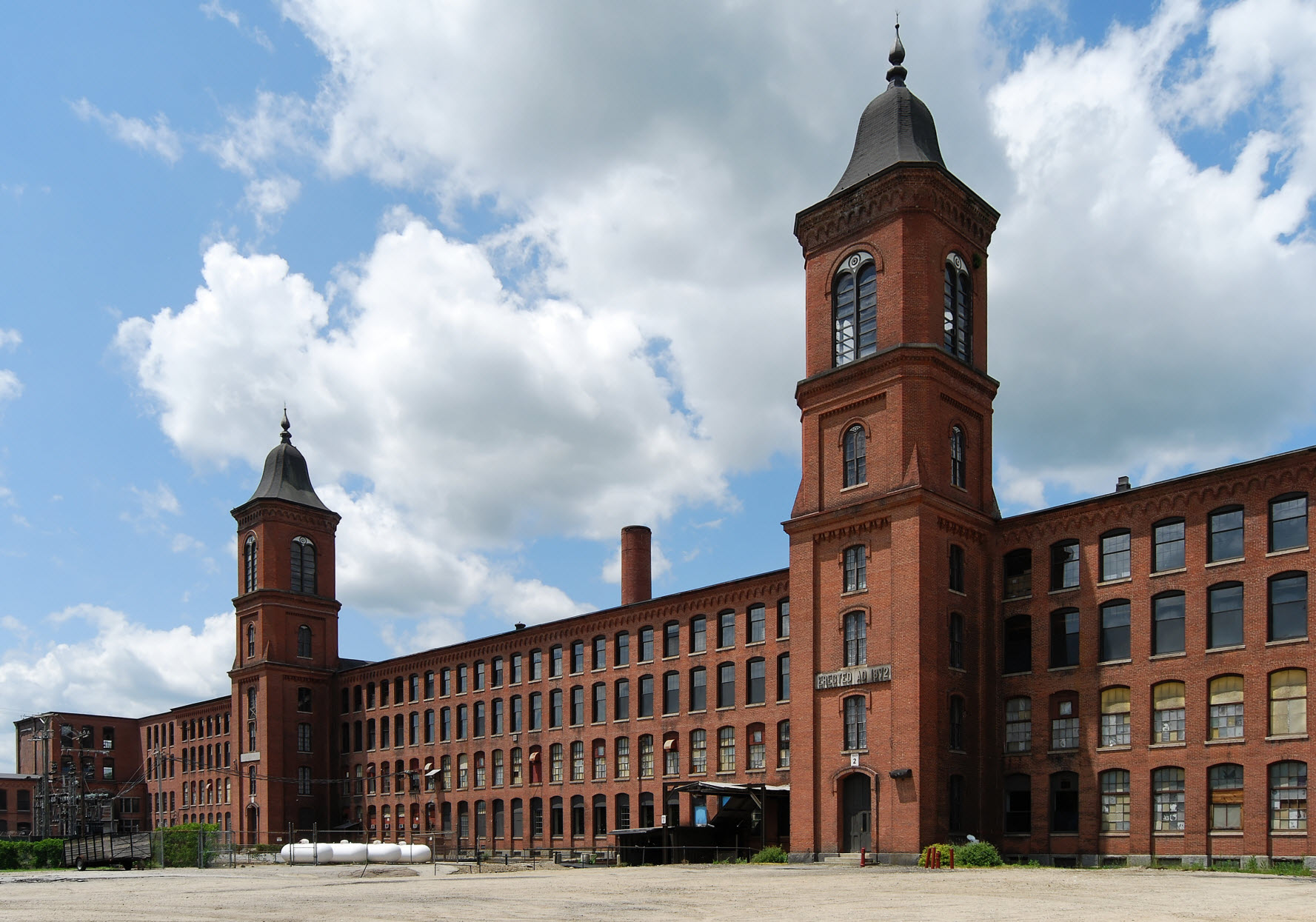

- Location in Windham County and the state of Connecticut.
- Location: Riverside Drive (Connecticut 12), Buckley Hill Road, Floral Avenue, Market Lane, and Marshall, Central, River, and Holmes Streets, Thompson, Connecticut
- Coordinates: 41°59′9″N 71°53′53″W
- Area: 70 acres (28 ha)
- Built: 1872
- Architect: F.P. Sheldon Co.
- Architectural style: Greek Revival, Romanesque
- NRHP reference No.: 93000288
- Added to NRHP: April 16, 1993

North Grosvenordale (/ˈɡroʊvnərdeɪl/ GROHV-nər-dayl) is a village and census-designated place (CDP) in the town of Thompson in Windham County, Connecticut, United States. The population was 1,530 at the 2010 census. The core of the village is listed as the North Grosvenordale Mill Historic District on the National Register of Historic Places. The historic area around the cotton mill was listed in 1993 and is located on Riverside Drive (Route 12), Buckley Hill Road, Floral Avenue, Market Lane, and Marshall, Central, River, and Holmes Streets.

== Geography ==
According to the United States Census Bureau, the CDP has a total area of 5.8 km^{2} (2.2 mi^{2}), all land. It is located in central Thompson, on the banks of the French River. The main road passing through the village is Connecticut Route 12, which roughly parallels the river's north–south course.

== History ==
North Grosvenordale was the site of early small textile mills, probably erected in the early years of the 19th century. The mill located here remained relatively small until after the American Civil War, when it and the associated water privileges were purchased by William Grosvenor, an investor from Providence, Rhode Island. Grosvenor also purchased a second mill further south, where he built a large new mill in 1868, calling that village Grosvenordale. When he built the large brick mill standing here in 1872, he renamed this village North Grosvenordale. This mill produced fine cotton fabrics, and was one of the longest-lived and most successful textile businesses in northeastern Connecticut.

Grosvenor also built significant tracts of worker housing on either side of the river. Most of these are multiple-family buildings with vernacular Greek Revival style. They were occupied in clusters by different groups of immigrant workers, giving rise to neighborhood names such as "Little Canada" and "Swede Village". The company also built some higher-quality single-family houses at the north end of the village, which were probably occupied by skilled specialists and supervisors. The mills operated until 1954, and have been adapted to other industrial uses. The mill and surrounding company-related resources (an area of about 70 acres (28 ha) with more than 100 buildings), was listed on the National Register of Historic Places in 1993.

== Demographics ==
As of the census of 2000, there were 1,424 people, 589 households, and 385 families residing in the CDP. The population density was 244.4/km^{2} (632.2/mi^{2}). There were 654 housing units at an average density of 112.2/km^{2} (290.4/mi^{2}). The racial makeup of the CDP was 97.19% White, 0.84% African American, 0.63% Native American, 0.28% Asian, 0.49% from other races, and 0.56% from two or more races. Hispanic or Latino of any race were 1.83% of the population.

There were 589 households, out of which 32.4% had children under the age of 18 living with them, 45.8% were married couples living together, 13.6% had a female householder with no husband present, and 34.5% were non-families. 29.2% of all households were made up of individuals, and 11.5% had someone living alone who was 65 years of age or older. The average household size was 2.42 and the average family size was 2.96.

In the CDP, the population was spread out, with 26.3% under the age of 18, 8.1% from 18 to 24, 31.7% from 25 to 44, 20.2% from 45 to 64, and 13.8% who were 65 years of age or older. The median age was 36 years. For every 100 females, there were 93.0 males. For every 100 females age 18 and over, there were 90.0 males.

The median income for a household in the CDP was $38,850, and the median income for a family was $38,214. Males had a median income of $33,906 versus $25,372 for females. The per capita income for the CDP was $16,409. About 6.7% of families and 10.9% of the population were below the poverty line, including 12.1% of those under age 18 and 8.0% of those age 65 or over.

== See also ==
- National Register of Historic Places listings in Windham County, Connecticut
