= Putnam (CDP), Connecticut =

- Census-designated place
- Putnam District
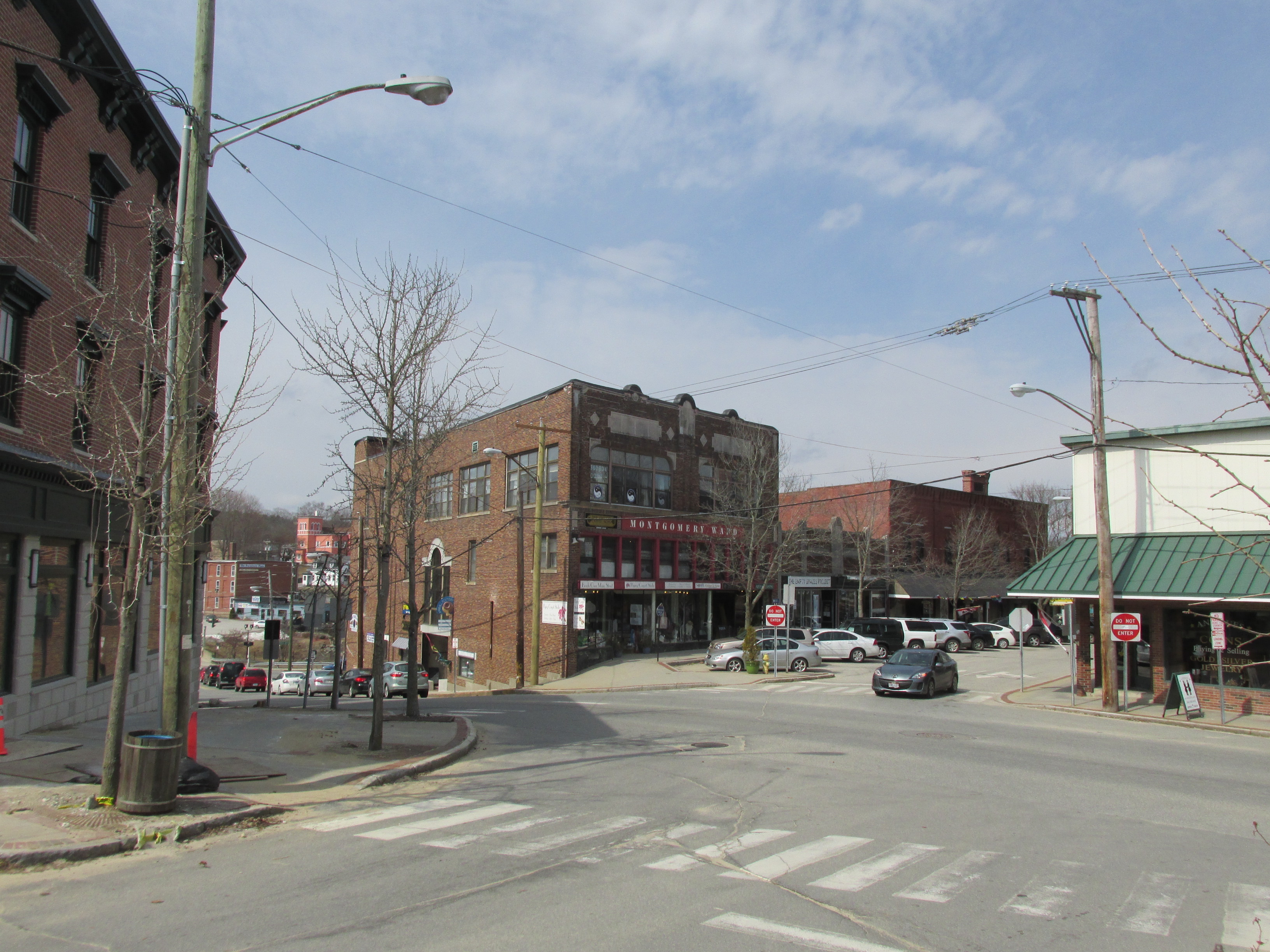
- Front of Montgomery Ward Building

- Location in Windham County and the state of Connecticut.
- Coordinates: 41°55′19″N 71°54′27″W
- Country: United States
- State: Connecticut
- County: Windham
- Town: Putnam

Area
  - Total: 3.2 sq mi (8.3 km^{2})
  - Land: 3.2 sq mi (8.3 km^{2})
  - Water: 0.039 sq mi (0.10 km^{2})
- Elevation: 259 ft (79 m)

Population (2010)
  - Total: 7,214
  - Density: 2,300/sq mi (870/km^{2})
- Time zone: UTC-5 (Eastern (EST))
  - Summer (DST): UTC-4 (EDT)
- ZIP code: 06260
- Area code: 860
- FIPS code: 09-62640
- GNIS feature ID: 2377854
- Website: www.putnamct.us

Putnam District is a village and census-designated place (CDP) in Windham County, Connecticut, United States. The CDP was formed when the former city of Putnam disincorporated, and it consists of the main town center of the town of Putnam along the Quinebaug River. The village is part of the Northeastern Connecticut Planning Region. The population was 7,214 at the 2010 census.

== Geography ==
According to the United States Census Bureau, the CDP has a total area of 3.2 square miles (8.3 km^{2}), of which 3.2 square miles (8.3 km^{2}) is land and 0.04 square miles (0.10 km^{2}) (1.24%) is water.

== Demographics ==
As of the census of 2010, there were 7,214 people, 3,033 households and 1,751 families in the CDP. The population density was 2,239 inhabitants per square mile (864/km^{2}). There were 3,325 housing units at an average density of 1,039 per square mile (401/km^{2}). The racial makeup of the CDP was 93.4% White, 1.5% African American, 0.6% Native American, 1.0% Asian, 0.0% Pacific Islander, 2.7% from other races, and 2.7% from two or more races. Hispanic or Latino of any race were 3.6% of the population.

There were 3,033 households, out of which 26.8% had children under the age of 18 living with them, 36.2% were married couples living together, 15.2% had a female householder with no husband present, and 42.3% were non-families. 33.3% of all households were made up of individuals living alone, and 13.5% had someone living alone who was 65 years of age or older. The average household size was 2.3 and the average family size was 2.9.

In the CDP the population was spread out, with 23.6% under the age of 18, 9.2% from 18 to 24, 28.0% from 25 to 44, 25.6% from 45 to 64, and 13.6% who were 65 years of age or older. The median age was 37 years.

The median income for a household in the CDP was $42,271, and the median income for a family was $51,356. Males had a median income of $48,824 versus $44,476 for females. The per capita income for the CDP was $24,934. About 13.6% of families and 18.0% of the population were below the poverty line, including 23.2% of those under age 18 and 10.7% of those age 65 or over.
