= Black James =

Nipmuc constable and spiritual leader

Black James (before 1640-circa 1686) (also known as Wullumahchein) was a Nipmuc constable and spiritual leader of the Chaubunagungamaug Nipmuck at the Chaubunagungamaug Reservation in colonial Massachusetts and Connecticut. Daniel Gookin appointed James to be a constable for the praying towns after he had become a Christian. In 1675, James signed a treaty agreeing not to assist King Philip, but may have supported him during King Philip's War. After the War, Black James deeded various parcels of land to settlers in Nipmuc country including at Manchaug (present day Oxford, Massachusetts), Quantisset and Maanexit in what is now eastern Connecticut near Rhode Island. His dying speech was recorded by Rev. Daniel Takawambait and later published and by 1686 a deed was signed by his heirs indicating that Black James was deceased, but another Indian used the name "Black James" until 1708.
