= Maanexit =

Maanexit (also spelled Manexit or Mayanexit) was a Nipmuc village on the Quinebaug River (Maanexit River) and Old Connecticut Path in Connecticut. The town was located near what is now Fabyan in Thompson, Connecticut and Woodstock, Connecticut. The name of the town means either "where the road lies" or "where we gather" which may have been "alluding to a settlement of Christian Indians in the immediate vicinity." The village became an Indian praying town through the influence of John Eliot and Daniel Gookin.

Maanexit was located six miles north of Quinnatisset, another praying town, and Maanexit had about one hundred residents prior to King Philip's War. In September 1674 Rev. John Eliot visited the village and preached about Psalms 24:7–10 and then appointed a Native American pastor John Moqua as Maanexit's teaching pastor for the Praying Indians there. After King Philip's War Black James deeded some of the land making up the village to white settlers.
