= Wabquisset =

Historical Native American community

The Wabquisset was a praying town, that is, a settlement for Native American converts to Puritan Christianity, founded in the 1670s near present-day North Woodstock, Connecticut.

The term also referred to the Native peoples who resided in Wabquisset. Collectively, Indigenous converts to Puritanism were called Praying Indians.

The settlement was west of the Quinebaug River, in what is now Windham County, Connecticut.

== Name ==
Wabquisset is also spelled Wabquissit, Wabuhquoshish, and Wabaquasset.

== History ==
The Massachusetts Bay Colony established this praying town in the territory of the Nipmuc, an Eastern Algonquian language-speaking Indigenous peoples of the Northeastern Woodlands. In 1668, the colony met with Indigenous leaders to plan this and three other Puritan praying towns: Quantisset, Chabanakongkomun, and Manchage.

These settlements were along or close to the Great Trail, or the Old Connecticut Trail. Wabquisset was four to five miles north of Quantisset.

In 1674, 30 families settled in the praying town. That year, Puritan missionary John Eliot (ca. 1604–1690) preached at Wabquisset.

The colony did not provide a teacher to the community until 1674, when a man named Sampson became their teacher.

The Native people at Wabquisset had previously paid tribute to the Uncas.

== Namesake ==
The United States Navy tugboat USS Wabaquasset was named for the community.
