= Quinnatisset =

Former town in Connecticut, US

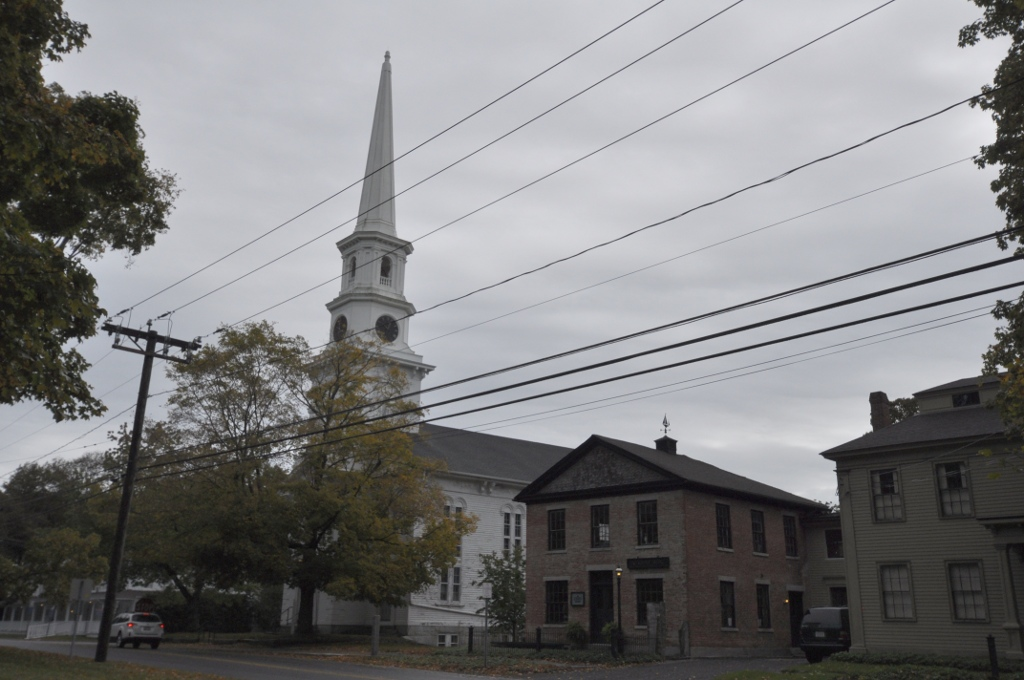
Quinnatisset was possibly located near the site of what is now the Congregational church

Quinnatisset (also spelled Quantisset, Quinnetusset, Quanatusset, Quantiske, Quantisset, Quatiske, or Quattissick) was a Nipmuc village in Connecticut which became a praying town through the influence of John Eliot and Daniel Gookin. The town was located near what is now Thompson, Connecticut or Pomfret, Connecticut possibly near Thompson Hill Historic District. The name "Quantisset" means "little long river."

Quinnatisset was located six miles south of Maanexit, another praying town. By 1667 John Eliot was involved with the village and attempted to mediate a misunderstanding regarding a tribute between the Quantisset Nipmucs and the Narragansett saunkskwa Quaiapin. Prior to King Philip's War Rev. Daniel Takawambait, possibly first ordained Native American in North America, served as a minister in the town. In 1674 Daniel Gookin wrote that "[f]or [Quantisset] we appointed a sober and pious young man of Natick, called Daniel, to be minister, whom they accepted in the Lord." After King Philip's War Black James sold several thousand acres of land in Quinnatisset to settlers. As late as 1730 there was still a large wigwam visible on the hill. There was a Nipmuc fort in Quinnatisset which "was assaulted and demolished, but the aboriginal cellar on Fort hill" is still visible.
