= Fabyan, Connecticut =

Village in Thompson, Connecticut

Coordinates: 42.01371°N 71.9401°W

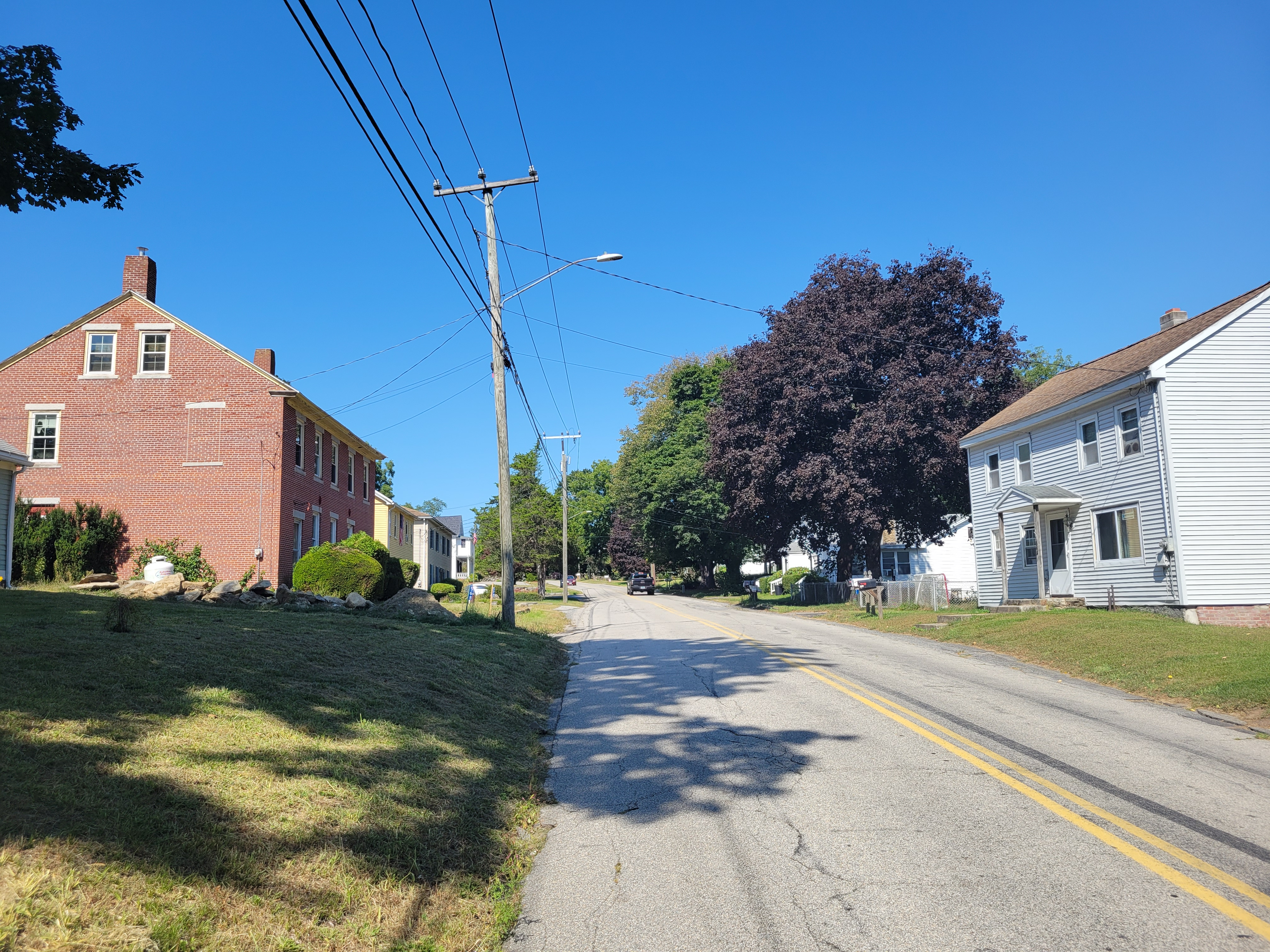
Fabyan Road

Fabyan (previously known as New Boston) is a village in the town of Thompson, Connecticut, United States. The former Indian village of Maanexit was located near what is now Fabyan and Maanexit was a praying town which was home to a population of Praying Indians. Fabyan started as a mill village, named New Boston, which contained a clothier and a potash manufacturer as well as the New Boston Textile Company, which was purchased in 1908 by the Fabyan Brothers, who changed the name of the mill and village to Fabyan.
