= The Cottage House =

Bed and breakfast in Thompson, Connecticut, US

Coordinates: 41.9585°N 71.8625°W

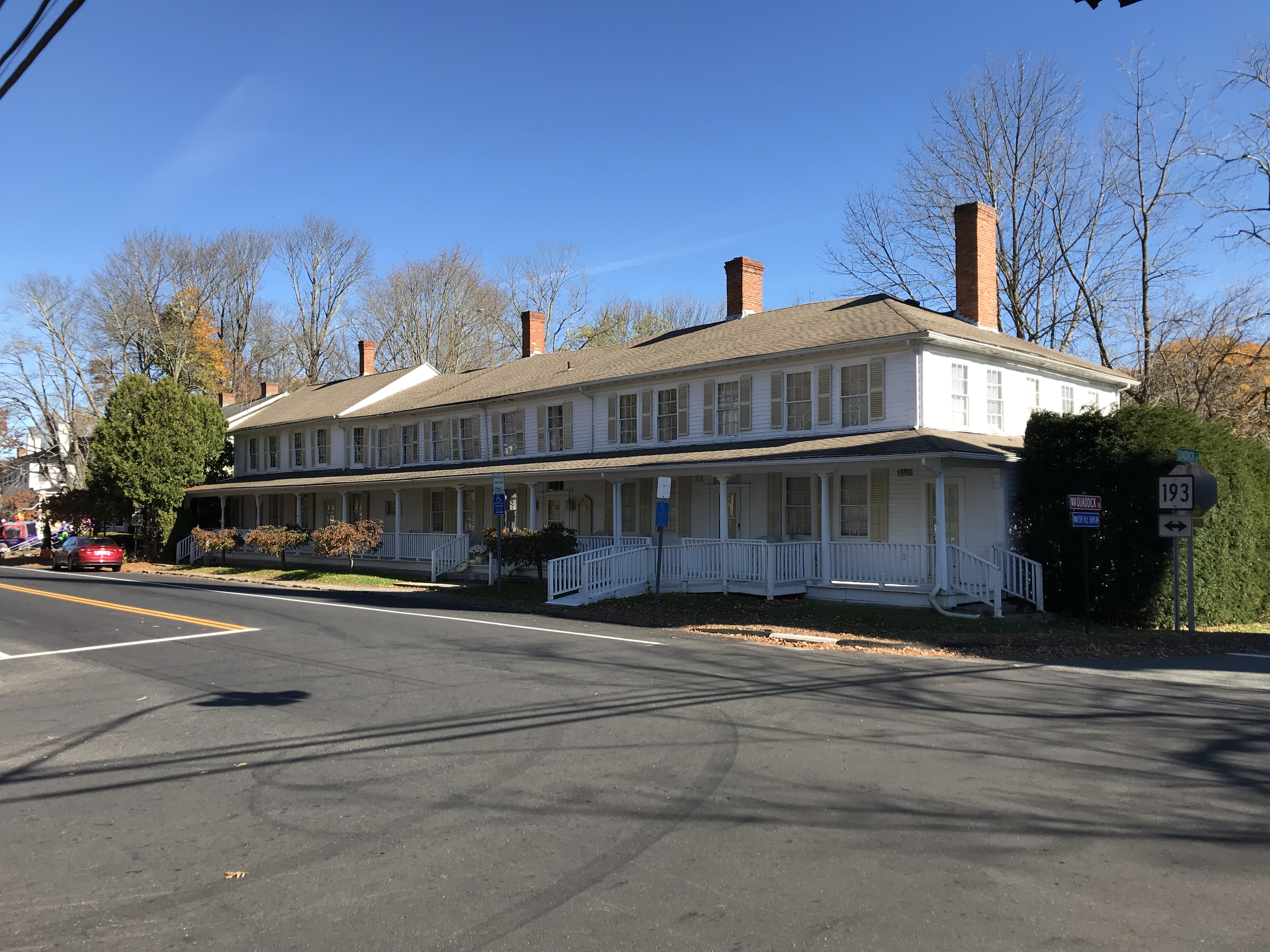
The Cottage House

The Cottage House, formerly known as the White Horse Inn and Vernon Stiles Inn, is a historic bed and breakfast located in Thompson, Connecticut, United States.

== History ==
Built in 1814 by Stephen Tefft, Dr. James Webb, Noadiah Comins, and Hezekiah Olney, the inn began as one of many public houses in the area. After Captain Vernon Stiles purchased it in 1830, it became Stiles Tavern and quickly gained popularity, boasting that “more stage passengers dined there every day than at any other house in New England.”

In addition to its fame as an inn, Stiles Tavern also became known as a wedding facility. Couples who disliked their state's requirements for publishing their intentions to marry fled to Connecticut. There, Captain Stiles, also a Justice of the Peace, wed them in his tavern. The unions of these run-aways earned Stiles Tavern the celebrated reputation as the “Gretna Green of New England.”

When the temperance movement arose in the mid-1830s, Captain Stiles disposed of his liquor, transforming his tavern into a temperance house. After Captain Stiles, several innkeepers owned and managed the inn over the years. Eventually changing from a tavern to a restaurant, the building took on different titles, such as the Vernon Stiles Inn, the White Horse Inn at Vernon Stiles, and simply the White Horse Inn.

== Present state ==
Now a bed and breakfast, the inn currently is called The Cottage House. Though it no longer holds wedding ceremonies, it still accommodates several brides and guests of couples who host their weddings or receptions at its nearby sister property, Lord Thompson Manor, also a historic site.

The Cottage House is part of the Thompson Hill Historic District, registered with the National Register of Historic Places; the State Register, and the Local Register, and is also recognized as a National Historical Site, a State Historical Site, and a City Historical Site.

== Claims to fame ==
Since Captain Vernon Stiles's purchase of the inn in the 1830s, the signs outside The Cottage House have portrayed a gentleman riding in a carriage pulled by a white horse. This image depicts a visit from the famous Marquis de Lafayette in 1824. Lafayette stayed at the inn for three days during his tour of America, and visited with a few of the town locals.

The Cottage House also was used in the 1959 filming of the mystery movie, The Man in the Net.
