= Magunkaquog =

Magunkaquog Magunko, Magunksquog, Magunkook, Magwonkkommuk
- Praying town
- Founded: 1660

Magunkaquog (transl. "place of great trees") was one of the Christian Indigenous praying towns established by the missionary John Eliot near the Massachusetts Bay Colony. Magunkaquog was established in 1660. The name came from the oaks and chestnuts which were growing in the area.

The name ‘Praying Indians’ was given to Native North Americans who accepted Christianity. It was normally used with regard to those living in East Massachusetts who were organized into villages by the Puritan missionary John Eliot. In 1674 there were seven principal praying towns - Magunkaquog, Natick, Punkapog, Wamesit, Hassanamesit, Nashobah, and Okommakamesit. Natick, founded in 1651, was the oldest. During King Philip’s War (1675) the praying towns were mostly wiped out; from a population of 1,100 in 1674, they were reduced to 300 by 1680.

The New England Company later asked the Natick to sell Magunkaquog to them. The Natick eventually agreed to the deal, despite their emotional attachment to the area.

== See also ==
Nipmuc people
