= Thompson Hill Historic District =

Historic district in Connecticut, United States

- U.S. National Register of Historic Places
- U.S. Historic district
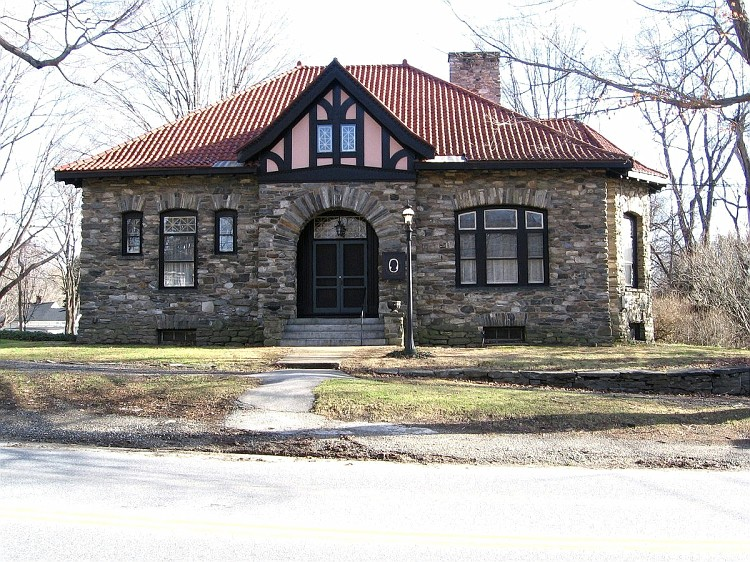
- Ellen Larned Memorial Library

- Location within Connecticut Location within the United States
- Location: Chase & Quaddick Roads, CT 193 & CT 200, Thompson, Connecticut
- Coordinates: 41°57′27″N 71°52′6″W
- Area: 550 acres (220 ha)
- Architect: Shepley, Rutan and Coolidge; Et al.
- Architectural style: Colonial Revival, Greek Revival, Federal
- NRHP reference No.: 87002186
- Added to NRHP: December 31, 1987

The Thompson Hill Historic District encompasses the historic village center of Thompson, Connecticut. The district covers 550 acres (220 ha), whose central focus is the Thompson Center Green, laid out when the town was established in 1735. Thompson Hill was the town's early civic and economic center, later supplanted by industrial villages, and retains well-preserved architecture from the 18th and early 19th centuries. The district was listed on the National Register of Historic Places in 1987.

== Description and history ==
Thompson was settled about 1700 as part of Killingly, and was separately incorporated in 1785. It was near the site of a former Indian praying town known as Quinnatisset. An early tavern stood on Thompson Hill by 1716, serving travelers on what was then the main road to Providence, Rhode Island. In 1730 its residents petitioned the colonial assembly to establish a separate parish, which was granted. Its first meeting house was built in 1735 in this area. In 1797, Thompson Hill benefited from the creation of turnpikes which intersected here (now Routes 193 and 200), spurring additional development and traffic. The area prospered until 1850, when the railroads bypassed the village. The town's economic focus passed to its mill villages, effectively ending significant development at Thompson Hill. It saw a brief revival in the early 20th century, with the establishment of country estates nearby, drawn by the charm of the village.

The historic district is 550 acres (220 ha) in size, and includes more than 100 historically significant buildings. It includes The Cottage House, a historic bed and breakfast, as well as the Thompson Congregational Church, the original Thompson Meeting Hall (known colloquially as "The Old Town Hall"), the Ellen Larned Museum, and several other historic houses built during the early-to-mid 19th century. It is also the site of the former country estate of Norman B. Ream, which is now home to the Marianapolis Preparatory School; its grounds were designed by the Olmsted Brothers firm.

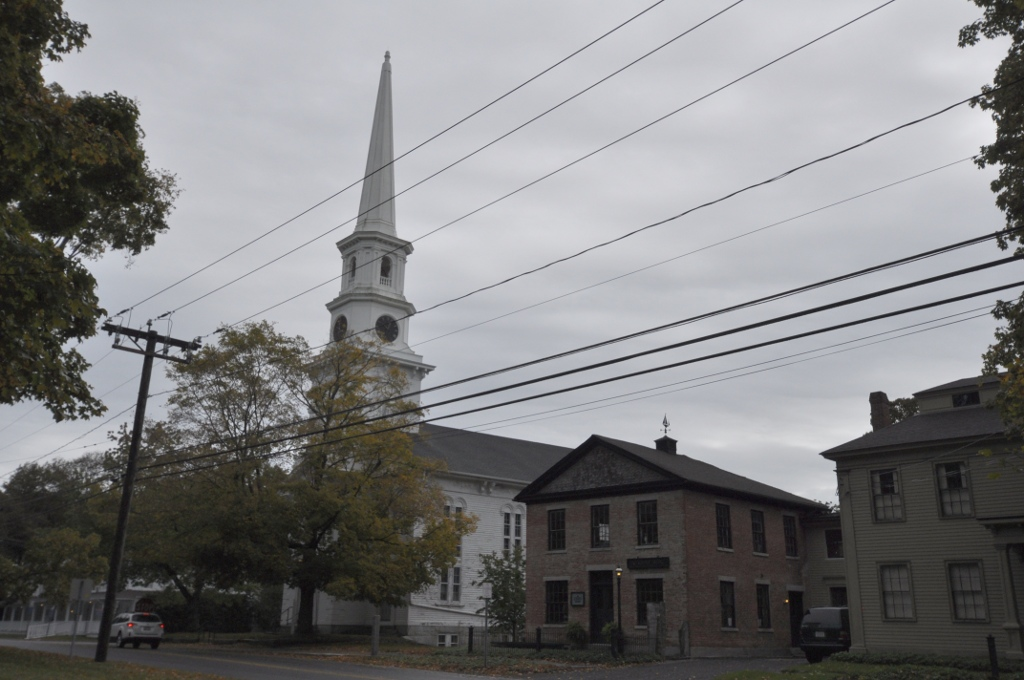
The church and other buildings adjacent to the green.

== See also ==
- National Register of Historic Places listings in Windham County, Connecticut
