= Daniel Takawambait =

Native American Christian pastor

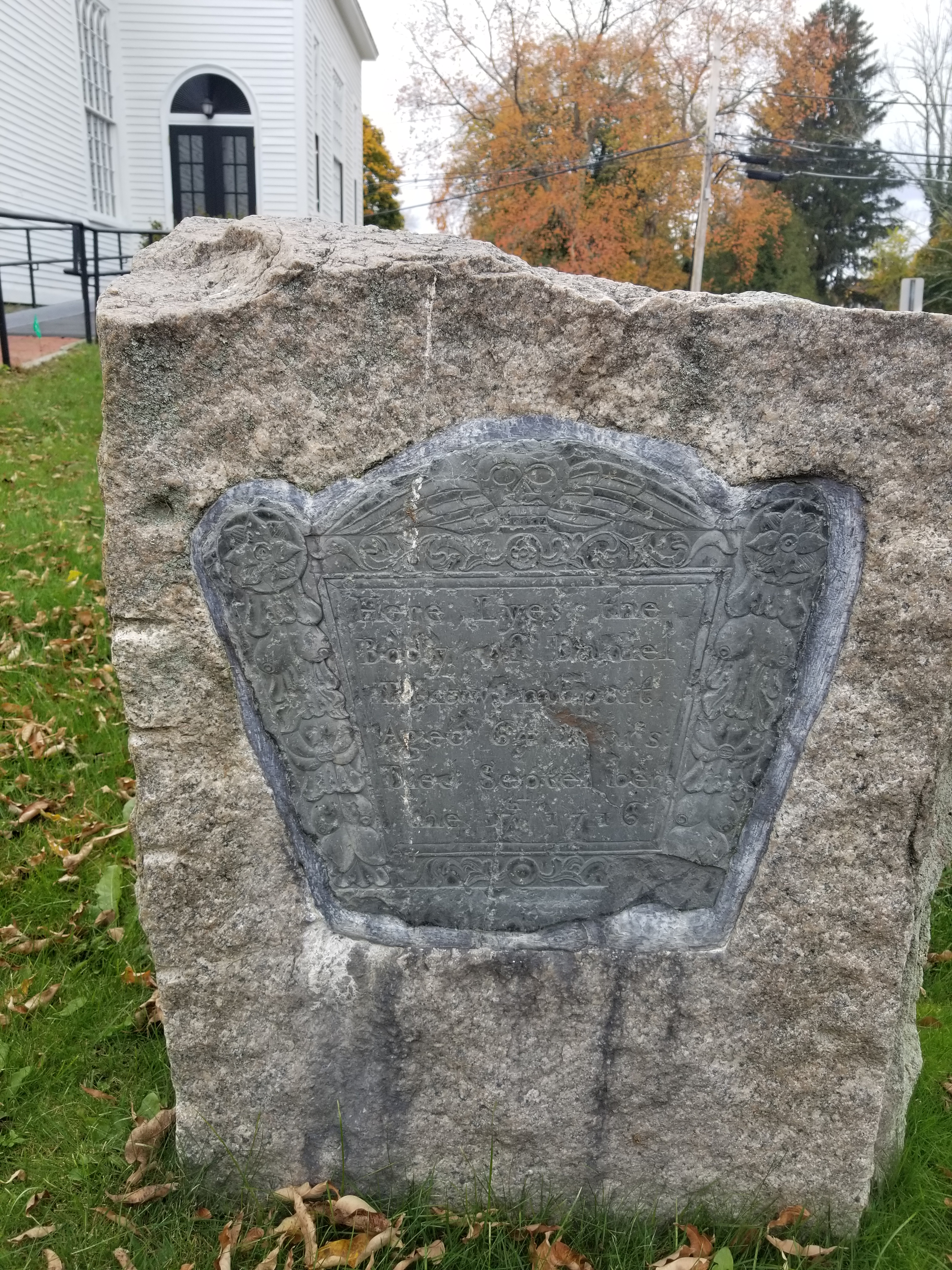
Gravestone of Daniel Takawambait (1652-1716) an American Indian pastor, adjacent to Eliot Church in South Natick, MA, the former Praying Town

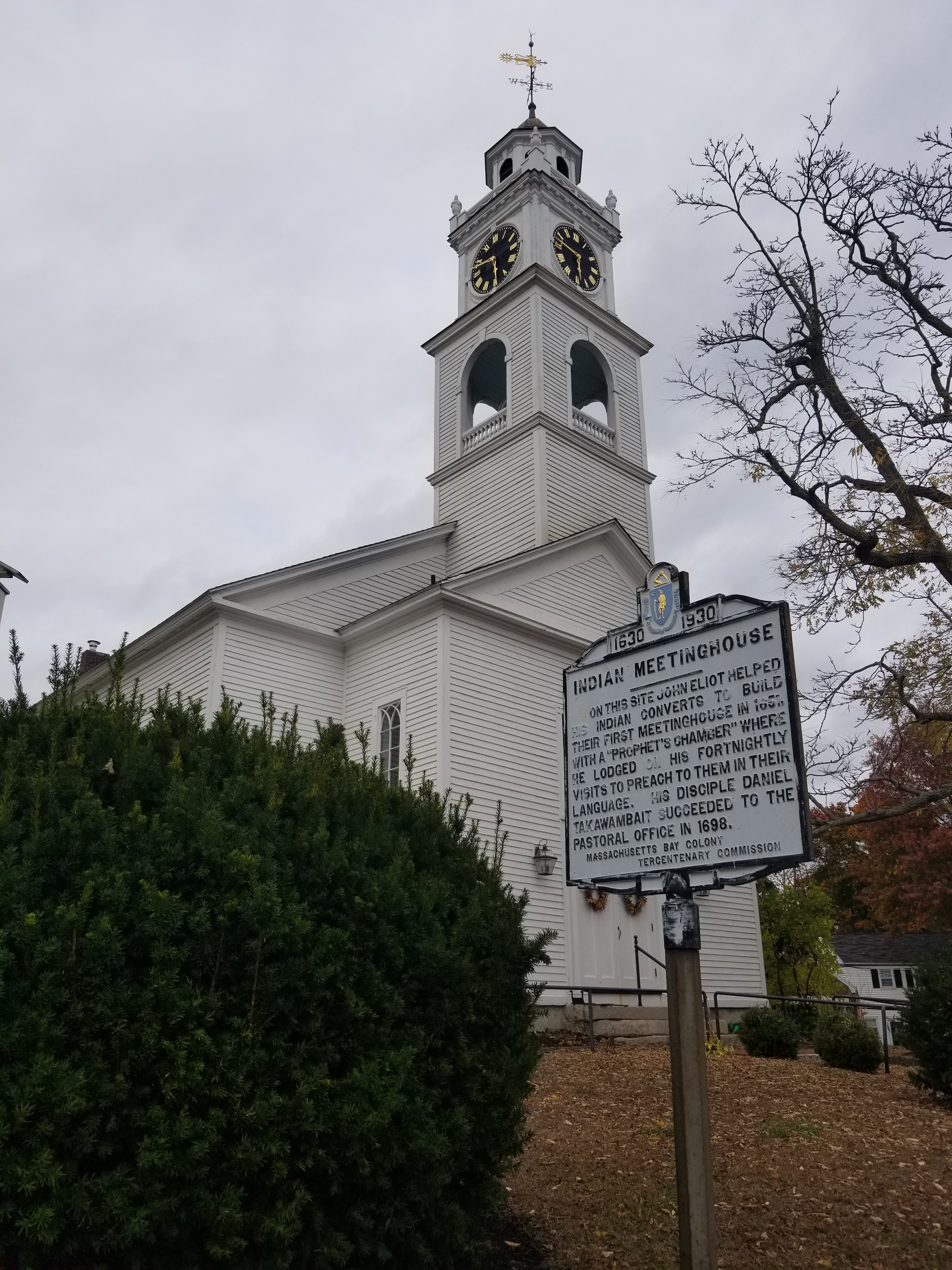
Church site and plaque marking the work of Eliot and Daniel Takawambait

Daniel Takawambait (c. 1652-1716) (also spelled Takawombait or Tokonwonpat or Takawambpas or Tookumwombait or Tokkohwompait or Takawombpait and sometimes Daniel of Natick) was likely the first ordained Native American Christian pastor in North America, and served the church in the praying town of Natick, Massachusetts from 1683 to 1716. Takawambait also advocated for indigenous land rights in colonial Massachusetts, and authored at least one publication.

== Early life and ministry ==
Takawambait was born around 1652 to a family of Nipmuc origin. He became associated with missionary John Eliot at a young age and may have attended Harvard's Indian College. In 1674 Daniel Gookin wrote that "[f]or [ Quantisset (in eastern Connecticut)] we appointed a sober and pious young man of Natick, called Daniel, to be minister, whom they accepted in the Lord." In 1676 Takawambait signed a petition with several other Indians in Natick and Punkapoag "requesting the release of an Indian youth named Peter" who "was a servant of John Kingsley before he was imprisoned."

After the War Takawambait was ordained around 1681. Around the same time, Rev. Daniel Gookin, Jr. of Sherborn began preaching once a month in the Natick Indian church solely in English which proved unfruitful without a Nipmuc translator, but the congregation enjoyed worshipping with Gookin's Sherborn congregants who often joined him in the Native American church. In 1683 the Indigenous congregation, including Takawambait, appealed to the John Eliot using a theological argument from Paul the Apostle's letter in 1 Corinthians 14:27–28 and requested that services continue in the Nipmuc language by either Gookin learning the language or using their local interpreter. Eventually, "[i]n 1683, the [Natick Praying] town appointed their second minister, Daniel Takawambait, an Indigenous man, to replace John Eliot." In 1685 at the request of Gookin, Takawambait wrote down the final words of several deceased Natives Americans church members (Waban, Piambohou, Old Jacob, Antony, Nehemiah, John Owussumug, Sr., John Speen, and Black James) in their native language, and their speeches were translated by Eliot and published in English in a pamphlet entitled "Dying Speeches and Counsels Of such Indians as dyed in the Lord."

== Land transaction involvement ==
In addition to serving as a bilingual pastor, Takawambait was a community leader and signed and witnessed deeds for various Native American land transactions. Between 1681 and 1685 Takawambait signed documents with other Nipmucs protesting the sale of tribal lands including near what is now Marlborough, Massachusetts and elsewhere in "Nipmuc country" by various Native American parties who acted without authority including Waban, Great James, and John Wompas in transferring land titles to settlers. Also, Takawambait witnessed a confirmatory deed by Peter Jethro and others in 1684 of lands in Sudbury and what is now Maynard, Massachusetts.

After King Philip's War several Indians returned to Natick from slavery in the Caribbean including Sagamore George (Wenepoykin), who had been enslaved in Barbados, and in 1686 after George's death, Takawombait gave evidence in deposition regarding George's land at Naumkeag (Salem) and his background stating that "Sagamore George when he came from Barbados he lived Sometime and dyed at the house of James Rumley Marsh," and "he left all this land belonging to him unto his kinsman James Rumley Marsh." In 1692 Takawambait also deeded Natick land to the Sawin family.

== Later ministry and death ==
By 1699 many worshippers in at Takawambait's church in Natick had died or left Natick because they were impoverished and needed to live among the English to support themselves, and the original meeting house, built in 1651, was falling down, so the congregation petitioned the government to allow Natick to sell two hundred acres of indigenous land in order to hire a carpenter to rebuild the meeting house. Two white pastors, Grindal Rawson and Samuel Danforth, of Mendon and Taunton, visited Takawambait's church in 1698 and noted that only a small church remained with ten official members, but Takawambait was "a person of great knowledge." Despite Takawambait's language skills and knowledge of Christian theology, some Puritan church leaders were concerned that Takawambait had some unknown theological errors or “errata” which may have included incorporating indigenous traditions into the worship services. By the 1712 colonial religious leaders, such as Cotton Mather, were concerned the church had diminished so much, that they discussed the possibility of removing Takawambait and blamed him and the lax membership procedures for the diminution in the church. Despite their concerns, Takawambait served as Natick's pastor until his death in 1716 and was one of the few Native Americans buried in the English fashion with a headstone and foot stone, and today his headstone is still viewable adjacent to the Eliot church in Natick where it was moved several feet from its original location near the intersection of Eliot and Pleasant streets, and his foot stone was moved and embedded into the Bacon Free Library building.

== Legacy ==
After Takawambait's death, the New England Company chose another Native American pastor, John Neesnumin of Sandwich, as a replacement in 1717, but he died two years later, and the church largely dissolved shortly after. Today Takawambait's pulpit desk is on exhibit in the Natick Historical Society Museum and was built by members of his congregation as one of the earliest surviving examples of Native American-made furniture. In the 1800s an I.O.O.F lodge in Natick was named in Takawambait's honor.
