= Great East Thompson Train Wreck =

1891 railroad accident in Connecticut, U.S.

Coordinates: 42.0089°N 71.8092°W

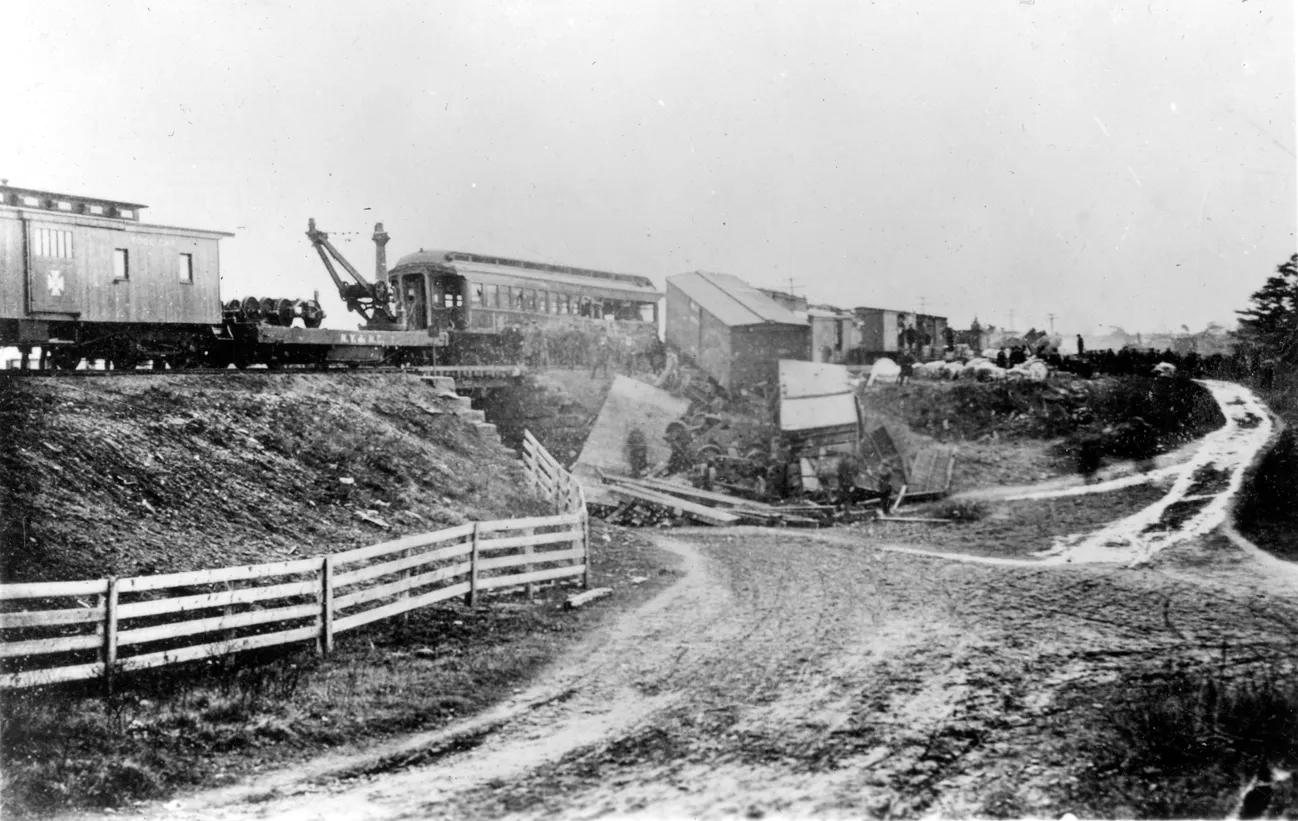

Details
- Date: December 4, 1891; 6:40 am
- Location: Thompson, Connecticut
- Country: United States
- Operator: New York and New England Railroad
- Incident type: Collision
- Cause: Crew error

Statistics
- Trains: 4
- Deaths: 2

The Great East Thompson Train Wreck was a large rail disaster which occurred in East Thompson, Connecticut, on December 4, 1891. It was one of the most extensive train wrecks in American history, and the first of two to involve four trains. It happened on the New York and New England Railroad, which provided a shortcut from New York City to Boston by making a diagonal across Connecticut. The railroad is now abandoned, and most of its tracks removed.

== Incident ==
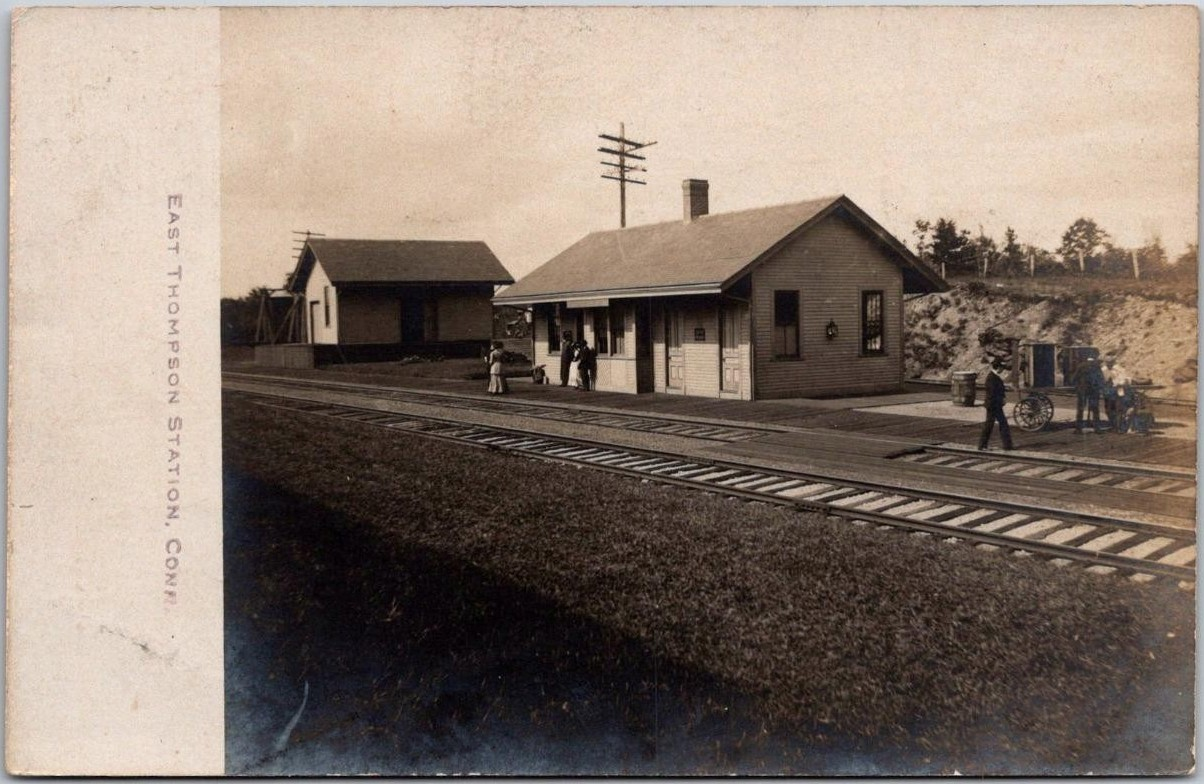
1900s postcard of East Thompson station

On the morning of December 4, 1891, four trains were scheduled to pass through East Thompson, in the town of Thompson in the northeastern corner of Connecticut: the hotshot Long Island & Eastern States Express from New York to Boston via a ferry across Long Island Sound; the Norwich Steamboat Express traveling to Boston from the quays of New London, Connecticut; the Southbridge Local freight to the town of that name just over the Massachusetts border; and freight train No. 212. To keep the slower No. 212 from impeding the approaching Eastern States Express, the local dispatcher allowed 212 to run on the left-hand track ahead of the express. Unfortunately both the dispatcher and 212's crew had forgotten about the oncoming Southbridge Local freight. At 6:40 am, just before the East Thompson station, the two freight trains collided head-on violently, jackknifing several cars and tossing one across both eastbound and westbound tracks.

Meanwhile, the Eastern States Express approached at 50 mph, unaware of the disaster. It crashed into the car across the other track, causing the engine to derail and strike a telephone pole, killing engineer Harry Tabor and fireman Gerry Fitzgerald. (Fitzgerald was actually substituting for Mike Flynn, who had been scheduled but was marked off the roster since he had had a premonition of disaster the night before.) Steam from the ruptured engine destroyed a nearby home.

Then the uninjured crewmen remembered the Norwich Steamboat Train. A flagman was sent out, but was too late to get the speeding express to stop. At 6:45 AM, it plowed eight feet into the rear of the Eastern States Express, setting fire to the rear sleeping car and the engine cab. Fortunately the crew suffered only cuts and scrapes.

All four engines, the sleeper, and a baggage car were destroyed, the track was torn up for about 500 yards (460 m) east of the passenger station, and hundreds of people were injured in the wreck. Miraculously, only two people were confirmed dead: Harry Taber and Gerry Fitzgerald of the Eastern States Express. A third man, R.H. Rath of New York, was presumed dead, but his body was never found. (It has been suggested Rath was not on the train, as he reappears very much alive in legal documents more than three years after the disaster.)

Windham County coroner A.G. Bill ruled engineer Henry Wildes and conductor William Dorman of the 212 responsible for the deaths of Tabor and Fitzgerald.

== Current conditions of crash site ==
The station has since been torn down, and the former New York & New England Railroad through this area is now traversed by the Air Line State Park rail trail, where displays and photo dioramas provide trail users with information about the train wreck. The location of the wreck was N 42° 00.530 W 071° 48.557 which now falls on the intersection of E. Thompson Road and New Road near the Rhode Island border. Close by is a trail loop leading to the Tri-State Marker, a small obelisk-shaped monument at the intersection of the Connecticut, Massachusetts and Rhode Island state borders.
