= USS Wabaquasset =

Tugboat of the United States Navy

History

United States
- Name: USS Wabaquasset
- Namesake: The Wabaquasset, a Native American band that once lived in Connecticut
- Builder: Canulette Shipbuilding Company, Inc., Slidell, Louisiana
- Laid down: 31 December 1941
- Launched: 17 June 1942
- In service: Perhaps March–June 1945, but may not have seen U.S. Navy service

General characteristics
- Class & type: YTB-331-class tug
- Displacement: 199 tons (full)
- Length: 94 ft 3 in (28.73 m)
- Beam: 25 ft 0 in (7.62 m)
- Draft: 13 ft 6 in (4.11 m) dph

USS Wabaquasset (YTB-724) was a tugboat that may have been operated by the United States Navy in 1945.

Wabaquasset was laid down as the large steel-hulled, metal arc-welded harbor tug Port Hudson under a Maritime Commission (MC) contract as MC hull 440 on 31 December 1941, at Slidell, Louisiana, by the Canulette Shipbuilding Company, Inc. Port Hudson was launched on 17 June 1942, sponsored by Miss Jean Canulette, and delivered to the War Shipping Administration (WSA) on 26 April 1943.

On 24 March 1945, the name USS Wabaquasset and the designation "YTB-724" were approved by the U.S. Navy for Port Hudson, but the ship was apparently not taken over for active U.S. Navy service. Records indicate that Wabaquasset was in fact not included on U.S. Navy crafts' lists. One source indicates that while the WSA owned the ship, the Navy operated her, but this statement is not supported by the sketchy records. Another source indicates that the tug was returned to WSA on 7 June 1945. In any event, it seems probable that the harbor tug saw little, if any, naval service.
