= Thompson, Connecticut =

- Town
- Town of Thompson
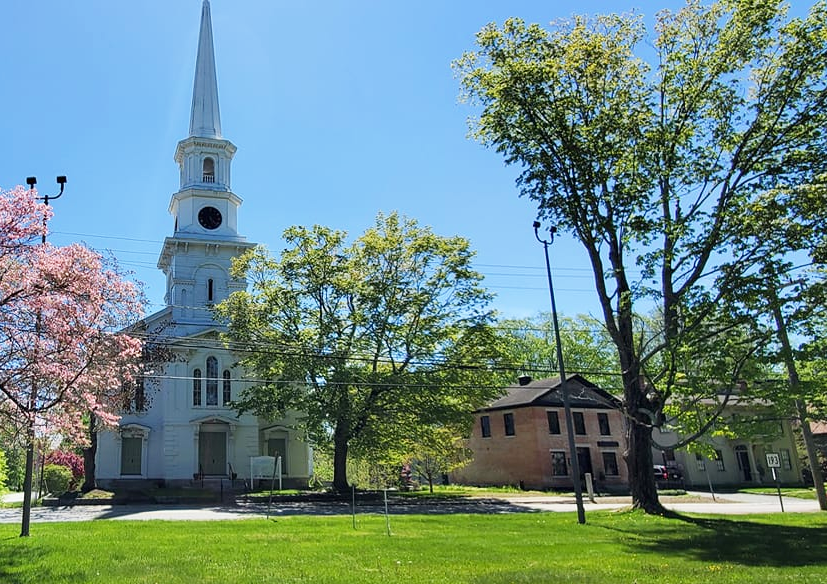
- View from the Thompson Common

- Seal Logo

- Coordinates: 41°59′04″N 71°52′40″W
- Country: United States
- U.S. state: Connecticut
- County: Windham
- Region: Northeastern CT
- Incorporated: 1785

Government
  - Type: Selectman-town meeting
  - First selectman: Amy St. Onge (R)
  - State Senator: Mae Flexer (D-29th District)
  - State Rep.: Rick Hayes (R-51st District)

Area
  - Total: 48.7 sq mi (126.1 km^{2})
  - Land: 47.0 sq mi (121.6 km^{2})
  - Water: 1.7 sq mi (4.4 km^{2})
- Elevation: 469 ft (143 m)

Population (2020)
  - Total: 9,189
  - Density: 195.7/sq mi (75.57/km^{2})
- Time zone: UTC-5 (Eastern)
  - Summer (DST): UTC-4 (Eastern)
- ZIP code: 06255, 06262, 06277
- Area codes: 860/959
- FIPS code: 09-75870
- GNIS feature ID: 0213516
- Website: thompsonct.org

Thompson is a town in Windham County, Connecticut, United States. The town is part of the Northeastern Connecticut Planning Region. The town was named after Sir Robert Thompson, an English landholder. The population was 9,189 at the 2020 census. Thompson is located in the northeastern corner of the state and is bordered on the north by Webster, Massachusetts and Dudley, Massachusetts, on the east by Douglas, Massachusetts and Burrillville, Rhode Island, on the west by Woodstock, Connecticut, and on the south by Putnam, Connecticut.

Thompson has the highest-banked race track (Thompson Speedway Motorsports Park, a 5/8 mile oval and a restored 1.7 mile road course) in New England. This speedway holds one of the biggest race programs in New England, The World Series of Auto Racing, where 16 divisions and about 400 cars show up each fall. Another claim to fame is that the Tri-State Marker is located just on the border of Thompson. The term "Swamp Yankee" is thought to have originated in Thompson during the American Revolution in 1776. In colonial times, the town was the site of an Indian village, known as Maanexit.

Thompson was the site of the Great East Thompson Train Wreck in 1891, one of the worst train wrecks in American history and the only one to involve four trains.

== Geography ==
According to the United States Census Bureau, the town has a total area of 48.7 square miles (126 km^{2}), of which 46.9 square miles (121 km^{2}) is land and 1.7 square miles (4.4 km^{2}), or 3.51%, is water. Thompson possesses many small ponds, such as Little Pond and Long Pond, as well as two principal lakes: West Thompson Lake and Quaddick Reservoir. Contained within its borders are several moderately sized rivers, including the French River and Five Mile River, both tributaries of the Quinebaug River, which also runs through Thompson. One of the highest points in Thompson and the surrounding villages is Fort Hill at 649 feet (198 m) above sea level. The city is located 64 miles southwest of Boston and 110 miles northeast of Bridgeport. It is on the 42nd parallel north, putting it on the same latitude as the northern suburbs of Rome, Italy.

A minor point of geological interest is the Wilsonville Fault, created during the breakup of Pangaea nearly 200 million years ago.

=== Adjacent towns ===
- Burrillville, Rhode Island
- Douglas, Massachusetts
- Dudley, Massachusetts
- Webster, Massachusetts
- Putnam
- Woodstock

=== Villages ===
Thompson is composed of ten villages:

- East Thompson
- Fabyan
- Grosvenordale
- Mechanicsville
- North Grosvenordale (including the North Grosvenordale Mill Historic District).
- Quaddick
- Quinebaug
- Thompson Hill (including the Thompson Hill Historic District).
- West Thompson
- Wilsonville

== Demographics ==
Historical population
Census	Pop.	Note	%±
1820	2,928		—
1840	3,535		—
1850	4,638		31.2%
1860	3,259		−29.7%
1870	3,804		16.7%
1880	5,051		32.8%
1890	5,580		10.5%
1900	6,442		15.4%
1910	4,804		−25.4%
1920	5,055		5.2%
1930	4,999		−1.1%
1940	5,577		11.6%
1950	5,585		0.1%
1960	6,217		11.3%
1970	7,580		21.9%
1980	8,141		7.4%
1990	8,668		6.5%
2000	8,878		2.4%
2010	9,458		6.5%
2020	9,189		−2.8%
U.S. Decennial Census

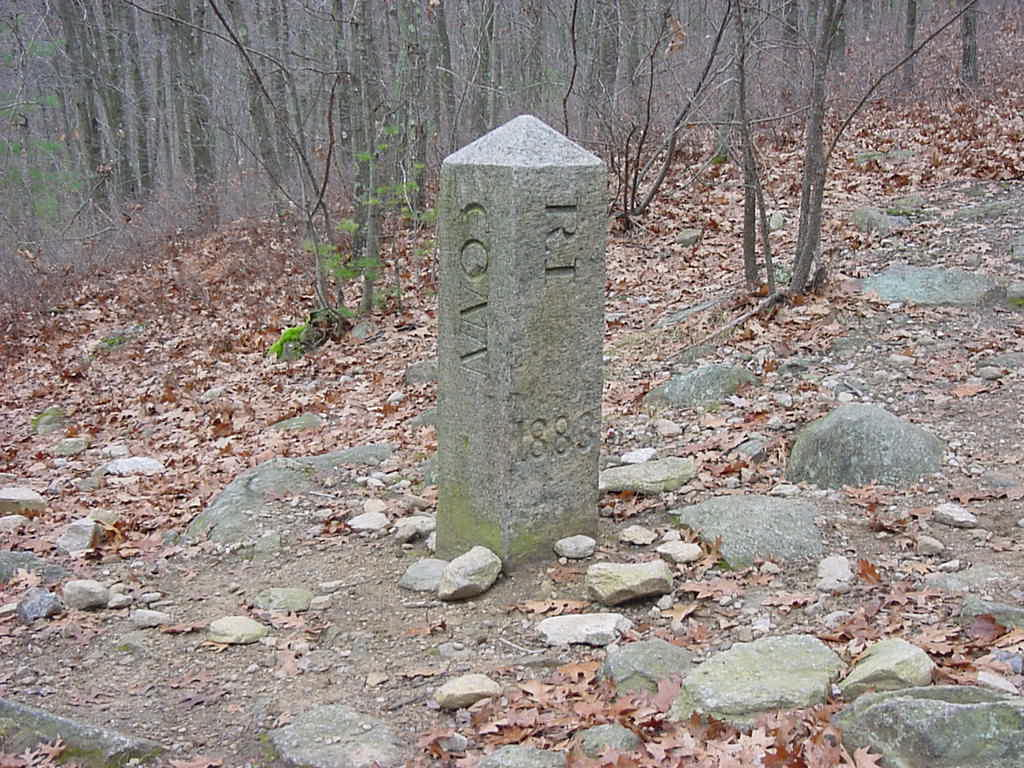
The CT-RI-MA Tri-State marker located in Thompson

As of the census of 2010, there were 9,458 people, 3,730 households, and 2,587 families residing in the town. The population density was 201.7 inhabitants per square mile (77.9/km^{2}). There were 4,171 housing units at an average density of 88.9 per square mile (34.3/km^{2}). The racial makeup of the town was 95.6% White, 0.6% African American, 0.4% Native American, 0.7% Asian, 0.04% Pacific Islander, 0.6% from other races, and 1.7% from two or more races. Hispanic or Latino of any race were 1.8% of the population.

Of the 3,730 households: 28.3% had children under the age of 18 living with them, 55.7% were married couples living together, 8.9% had a female householder with no husband present, and 30.6% were non-families. 24.5% of all households were made up of individuals, and 11.2% had someone living alone who was 65 years of age or older. The average household size was 2.51 and the average family size was 2.98.

In the town, the population was spread out, with 21.8% under the age of 18, 7.2% from 18 to 24, 24.5% from 25 to 44, 31.9% from 45 to 64, and 14.6% who were 65 years of age or older. The median age was 43 years. For every 100 females, there were 99.9 males. For every 100 females age 18 and over, there were 97.2 males.

The median income for a household in the town was $63,385, and the median income for a family was $75,652. Males had a median income of $52,716 versus $39,362 for females. The per capita income for the town was $29,044. About 5.1% of families and 7.5% of the population were below the poverty line, including 10.7% of those under age 18 and 5.5% of those age 65 or over.

== Schools ==
Thompson has a public school system in which the elementary, middle, and high school buildings are connected. The Mary R. Fisher Memorial Elementary School has students in Pre-K through 4th grade, Thompson Middle School consists of grades 5–8, and Tourtellotte Memorial High School has students in grades 9–12. Also in town are several private schools, the Catholic St Joseph's School, currently serving grades Pre-K–8, and Marianapolis Preparatory, a Marian high school located on historic Thompson Hill.

The original Tourtellotte Memorial High School building, which exists today as administrative offices for the school system, was built in the Greek Revival style. The cornerstone was laid in 1907 and the school opened in 1909. The school is named in memory of Dr. Jacob F. Tourtellotte. Tourtellotte was a ship's surgeon in the U.S. Navy during the Civil War. The school also houses a small museum, called the "Memorial Room" which contains portraits of Tourtellotte and his family, and some of their possessions. It is maintained by the local historical society, and is usually open to the public for tours one Sunday per month.

Marianapolis Preparatory School was established in 1926, sponsored by the Congregation of Marians of the Immaculate Conception. The school is located on the former Ream Estate, built by Norman Bruce Ream, a Director of The Pullman Company, U.S. Steel, and The National Biscuit Company, which is now known as Nabisco. The Estate, including the c. 1900 mansion "Carolyn Hall," named after Ream's wife, was sold to the Marians in 1931, but the Mansion burned down in 1964 and a new main school building was built in its place.

== Libraries ==
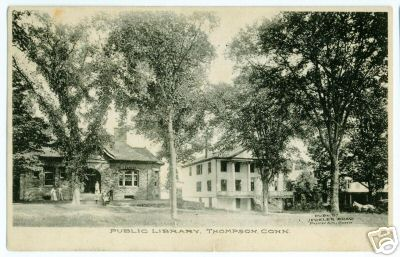
Public Library, c. 1908

The Thompson Public Library is located at 934 Riverside Drive, North Grosvenordale. It is combined with the town's Community Center, and contains 20,400 square feet (1,900 m^{2}) holding 55,000 items, including books, magazines, CDs, DVDs, audio tapes, video tapes, and online resources.

The library was started in 1902 with 1,370 books in a small building on Thompson Hill, now known as the Ellen Larned Memorial Library. Two branches were created, the Quinebaug Branch, in operation from 1961 to 1994, and the Grosvenordale Branch, in operation from 1958 to 1966. Thompson was the first small town in Connecticut to have a bookmobile service, operating from 1966 to 1993. The current library in North Grosvenordale was finished in 1994.

== Notable people ==
- Marietta Stanley Case (1845–1900), author and temperance advocate
- Emma Shaw Colcleugh (1846–1940), journalist, lecturer, traveler, and collector
- George Whitefield Davis (1839–1918), engineer and Major General in the United States Army, military governor of Puerto Rico and the first military governor of the Panama Canal Zone; born in Thompson
- James Hillman (1926–2011), post-Jungian psychologist and founder of Archetypal psychology; died at his home in Thompson
- Simon Larned (1753–1817), Revolutionary War captain, War of 1812 colonel and US Congressman for Massachusetts; born in Thompson
- Andrew Mamedoff (1912–1941), pilot who fought for the RAF and died during the Battle of Britain; born in Thompson
- James Brown Mason (1775–1819), two-term US Congressman for Rhode Island; born in Thompson
- Ossian Everett Mills (1846–1920), founder of the Phi Mu Alpha Sinfonia music fraternity; born in town and buried in a small family plot in Thompson
- James M. Munyon (1848–1918), publisher and doctor; born in Thompson
- General Stafford (1868–1923), baseball player; born in Thompson
- Daniel Takawambait (1652–1716), first indigenous pastor ordained in colonial America
- Raymond S. Thatcher (1903–1988), Connecticut State Comptroller for 10 years
- John E. Tourtellotte (1869–1939), architect; born in East Thompson
- Ithiel Town (1784–1844), architect and civil engineer; born in Thompson
- Anastasy Vonsiatsky (1898–1965), Russian anti-Bolshevik émigré and fascist leader of the All Russian National Revolutionary Party; lived in and is buried in Thompson
