= Daniel Gookin (pastor) =

American pastor

- Born: July 12, 1650; Cambridge
- Died: January 8, 1717/18; Sherborn
- Alma mater: Harvard College
- Occupation: Librarian; pastor
- Parent(s): Daniel Gookin; Mary Dolling

Daniel Gookin (July 12, 1650 – January 8, 1717/18) was an American pastor. He was the Librarian of Harvard from 1674 to 1676 and from 1679 to 1681.

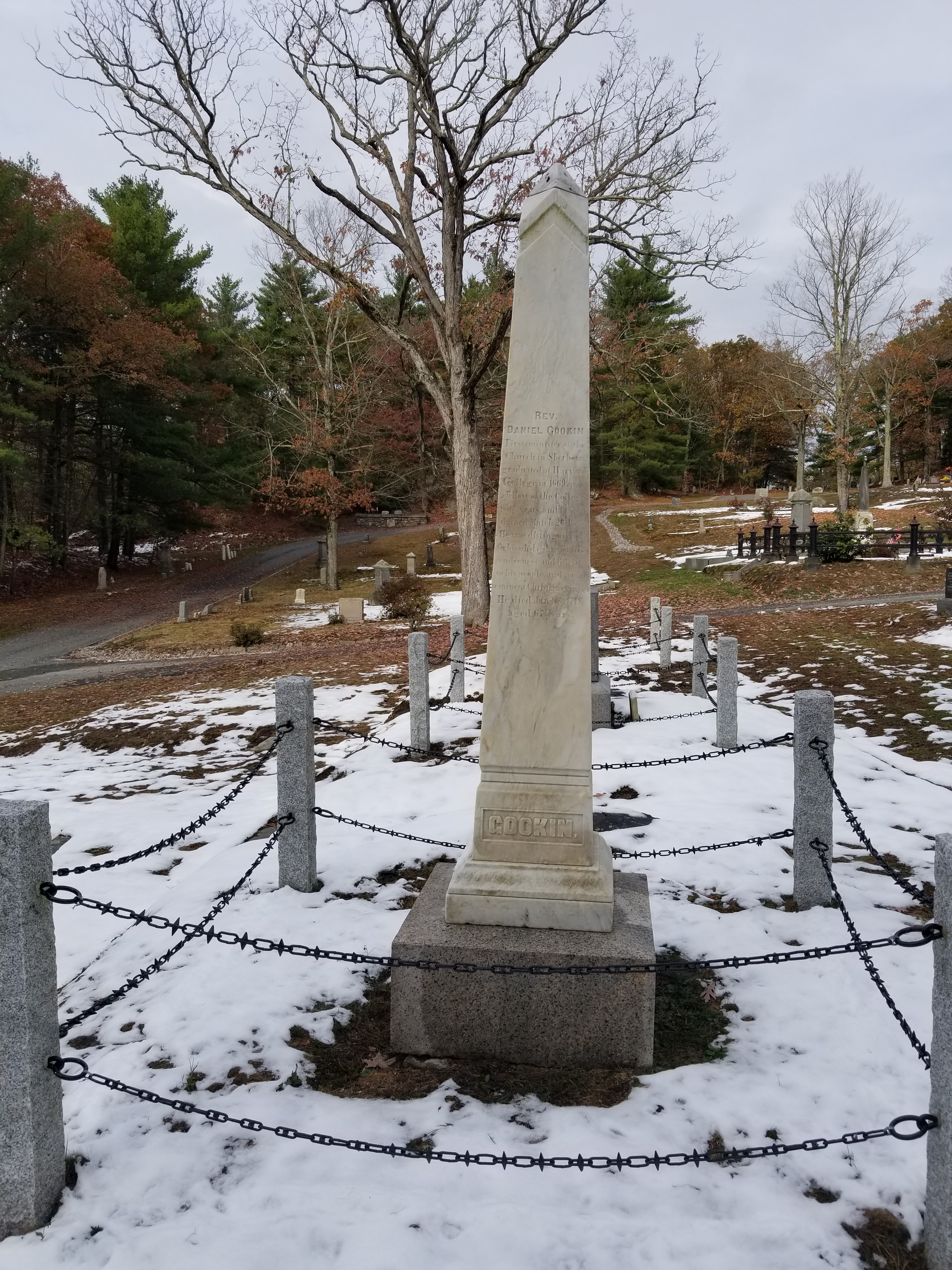
Daniel Gookin Jr grave monument in Sherborn

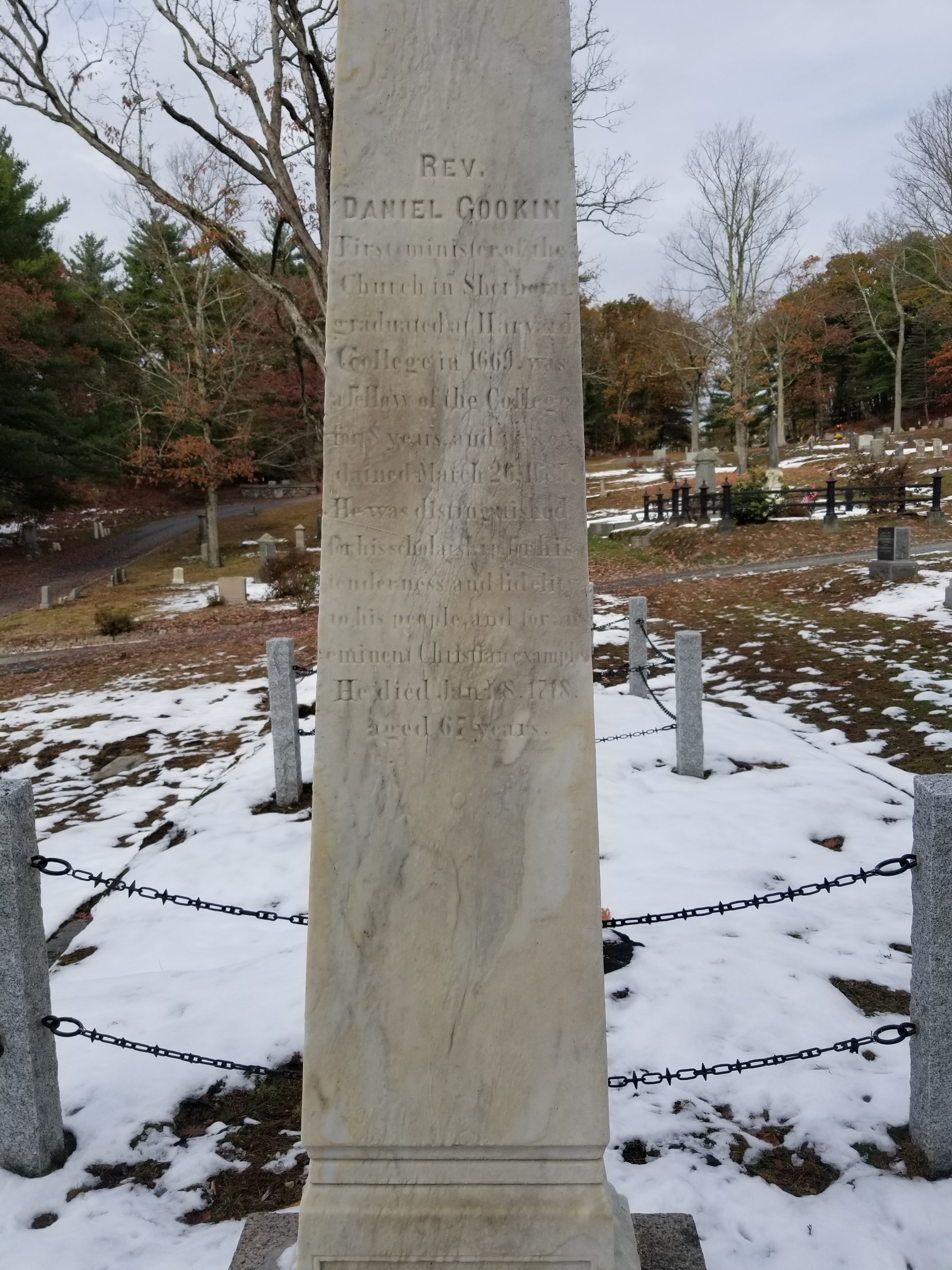
Daniel Gookin Jr. grave inscription

== Early life ==
Gookin, the son of Major-General Daniel Gookin and his wife Mary, was born at Cambridge, July 12, 1650. At the age of 19 he graduated at Harvard College with the class of 1669 and proceeded to his degree of Master of Arts. In May 1673, he " was chosen probation^{r}, & is forthwith to take y^{e} charge of a Classis," and in the fall his fellowship was confirmed by the Harvard Corporation. He remained a tutor and resident fellow for eight years. One of his pupils was Cotton Mather.

== Career ==
During this period he also twice served as Librarian, from 1674 to 1676 and 1679 to 1681. At a meeting of the Corporation, December 11, 1674, it was "Ordered further that hencforth Mr. Daniell Gookin be Library keeper : And that he enquire of persons formerly [con]cerned for finding out & restoring the book[s] found wanting in the last surveigh ma[de] by the Praesidt : himself and Mr Sewal as in the Library book." In August 1676, there was "paid mr Dan^{l} Gookin, one of the Fellowes, money 50s in Satisfaction for his paines in removing the library to the new Colledge & placeing them." This was evidently extra work, for some months previously Daniel Allin had been appointed Librarian; perhaps in the removal of the books to the first Harvard Hall, then only partially completed, the new Librarian was glad to have the aid of his predecessor. Gookin, however, in June 1679, was again " chosen Librarie keeper." Two months later the account-books of the College have the entry, "Paid to Jn^{o} Palfrey 36s on the president's note for 1 doz. Stooles made for Colledge Library." The following winter there is a record of payments of over 20 for freight on eleven boxes of books for the Library; probably these were the library of the English philologist and divine, Theophilus Gale, then recently bequeathed to the College.

In 1681, resigning his positions at Cambridge, Gookin began his services as a minister. He assisted the Apostle Eliot in his work among the Indians at Natick, and is described by him as " a pious and worthy young man." In Natick Gookin preached in English without learning the Nipmuc language, so the Natick congregation requested a translator be allowed, so Daniel Takowompait, an indigenous pastor, was selected as a pastor there. In March 1685, he was ordained pastor of the church at Sherborn, with an annual salary of "twenty pounds in money and twenty pounds in country pay." Here Gookin preached for many years, both to his parishioners and to the Indians, and here his death occurred, after a long illness, 8 January 1717/18. William Rider of Natick wrote to the editor of the News-Letter as follows :

"The Reverend, learned and pious Mr. Daniel Gookin deceased, aged about 67 years : who in his younger Time was a Fellow of Harvard College about the space of seven years; and since has been an Ordained Minister in said Town about 34 years; who many years preached the Indian Lectures at Natick ; a Gentleman sound in his Doctrine, explaining the Scriptures to the weakest Capacity, and painfull in his Studies, tender of his Flock, and Exemplary in his Life, and Lamented of all Good Men that had Acquaintance with him, especially in his own Church and Town." And his friend Sewall notes in his Diary : " He was a good Scholar, and a solid Divine. We were Fellows together at College, and have sung many a Tune in Consort; hope shall sing Hallelujah together in Heaven."

== Personal life ==
Coat of Arms of Daniel Gookin

Gookin married, first in 1681, Elizabeth, daughter of Edmund Quincy, whose father Edmund had become by that time the husband of Daniel's sister Elizabeth, the widow of John Eliot, and second, in 1692, Bethia, daughter of Edward Collicott or Richard Callicott. Gookin had seven children (Daniel, Mary, Edmund and Elizabeth by his first wife, and Bethia, Nathaniel, and Richard by his second wife).

Daniel Gookin never published anything, but there exists a printed catalogue of his library, which was sold, together with that of Joshua Moody, in 1718.
