= French River (Massachusetts) =

River in Massachusetts and Connecticut, United States

Coordinates: 42.0243°N 71.8841°W

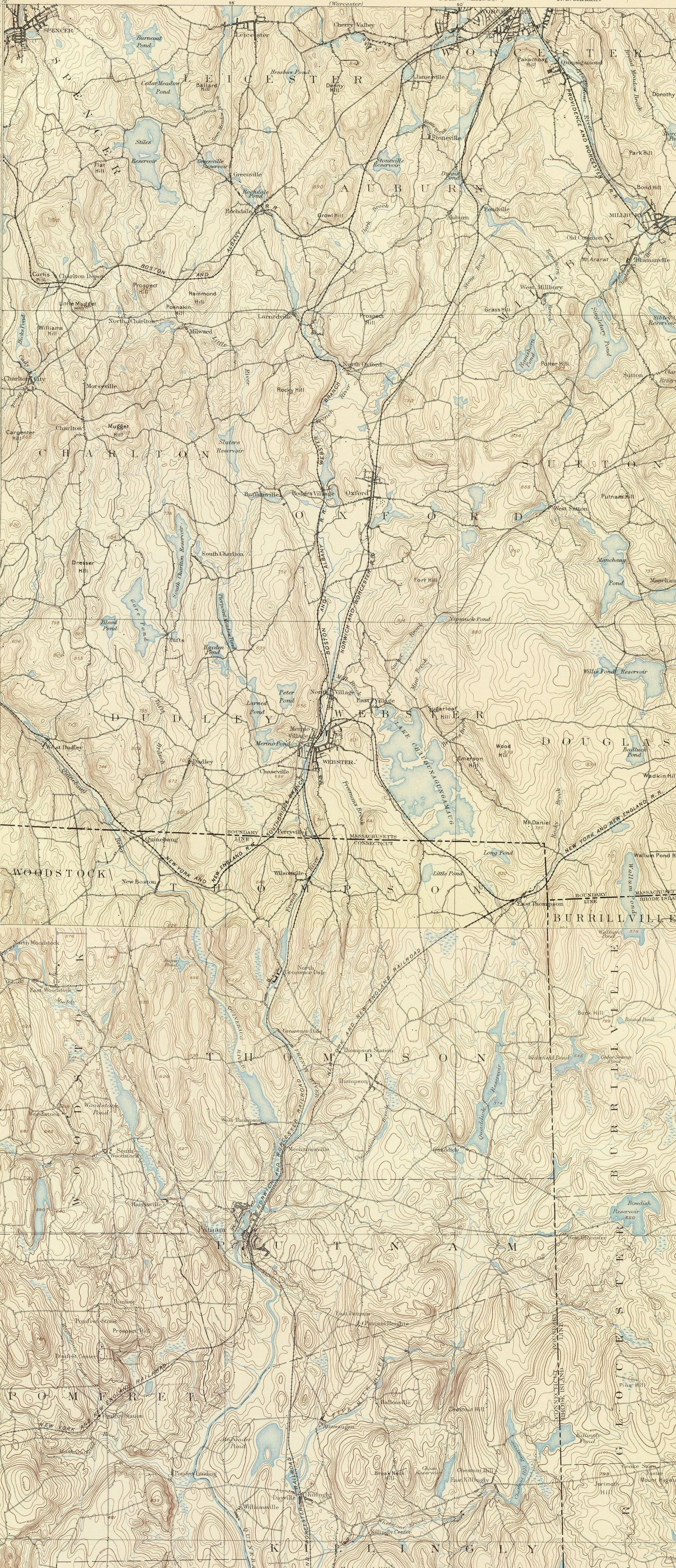
French River and environs

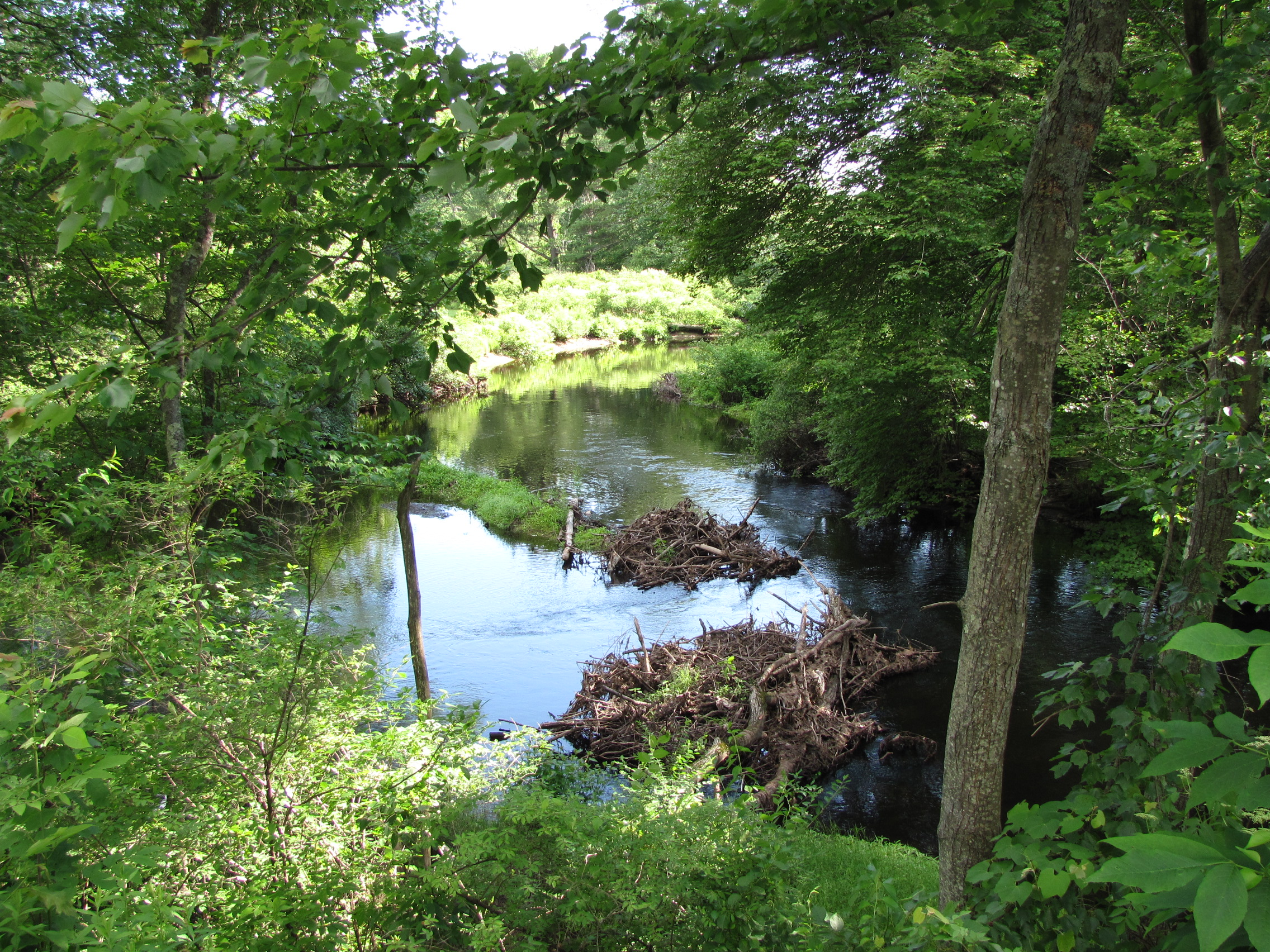
French River south of West Main Street, Hodges Village, Oxford, Massachusetts

The French River is a river in south-central Massachusetts and northeastern Connecticut, USA.

The river rises near Leicester, Massachusetts, and flows generally southwards through Auburn, Oxford, and along the town line between Webster and Dudley; it then enters Connecticut where it joins the Quinebaug River at Thompson, just northeast of Putnam. The Quinebaug in turn flows into the Shetucket River and ultimately the Thames River to empty into the Long Island Sound.

The river's total length is 25.3 miles (40.7 km), of which 18.8 miles (30.3 km) are in Massachusetts. It drains a watershed area of about 95 square miles (250 km^{2}), containing 67 lakes and ponds, 38 of which cover at least 10 acres (4.0 ha). Only one lake in its basin is larger than 500 acres (200 ha), namely Lake Chaubunagungamaug (Webster Lake) in Webster, Massachusetts at 1,195 acres (484 ha).

French River was so named from a settlement of French Protestants in Oxford.

== See also ==
- List of rivers of Connecticut
- List of rivers of Massachusetts
