= Wamesit =

17th-century Native American community in the Massachusetts

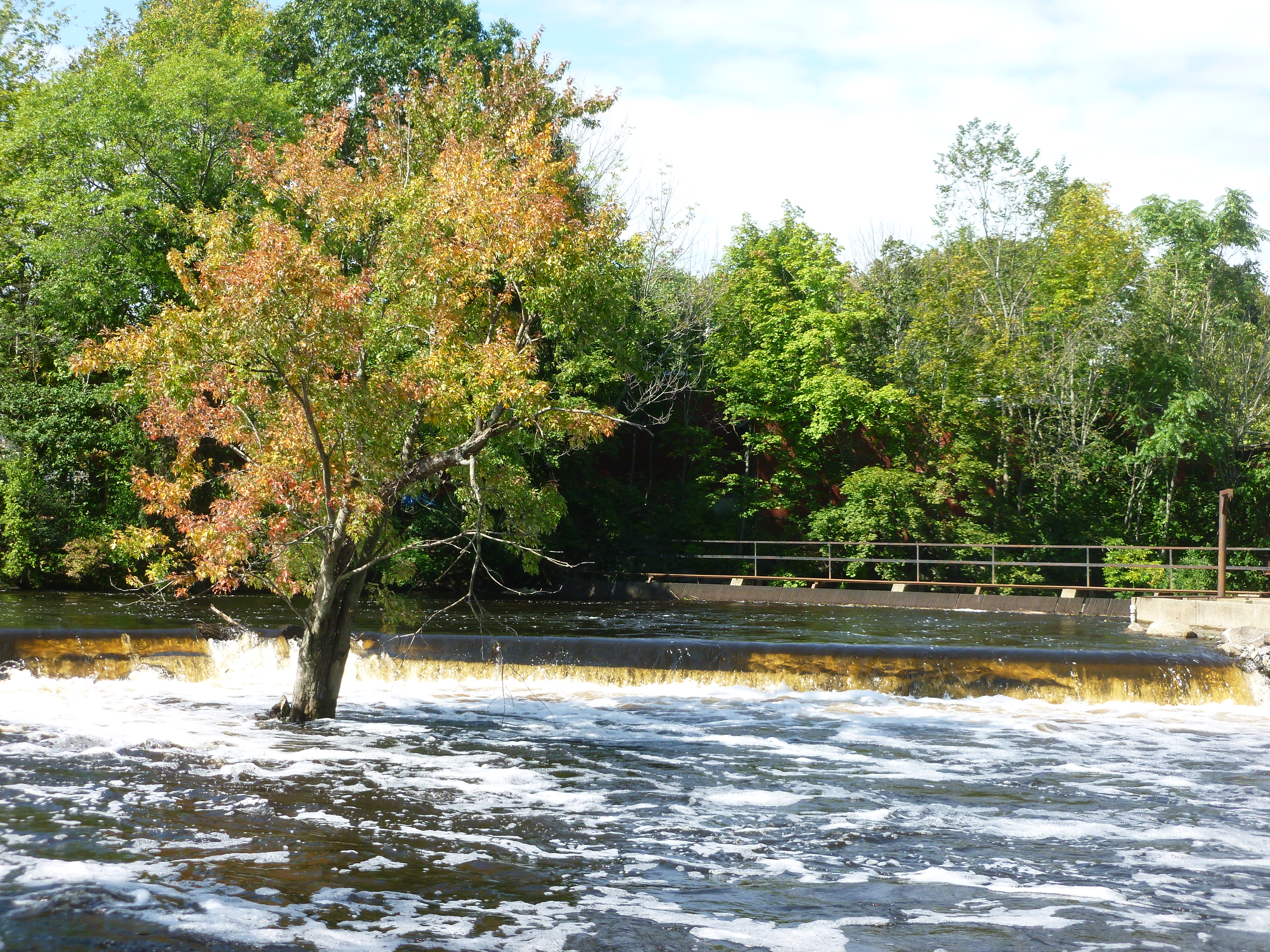
Wamesit Falls looking west near Lowell, Massachusetts

Wamesit was the band of Pennacook people, the name of their village, and later the name of a praying town in 17th-century Massachusetts Bay Colony, situated at the juncture of the Concord River and Merrimack River, in present–day downtown Lowell, Massachusetts.

== Band ==
The Wamesit were a band of Pennacook, who were an Alonguian-speaking people. They lived in what is now northeastern Massachusetts at the confluence of the Concord and Merrimack Rivers, near an important seasonal fish run at Pawtucket Falls, described as an "ancient and capital seat of Indians [where] they come to fish."

== Praying town ==
In the 1650s, as part of the larger missionary efforts of John Eliot and the Society for the Propagation of the Gospel in New England, a portion of this group was induced to settle into a European-style praying town. In 1655, the Massachusetts Bay Colony formally gave Wamesit a charter.

In 1674, there were an estimated 15 families of praying Indians in the European-style settlement at Wamesit, though many other non-Christianized Indigenous people continued to pass through the important fishing grounds.

== King Philip's War and aftermath ==
In June 1675, King Philip's War broke out between Wompanoag chief Metacomet and his allies, and the United Colonies of New England.

During King Phillip's War, praying Indians faced danger from both non-Christianized Native groups and English settlers. During the war, in response to a local hay field being burned, one hundred forty-five Wamesit residents were captured by local English militias, thirty-five of whom were then marched to Cambridge to face trial for the hay burning; of these several were sold into slavery in the West Indies as a result of suspected participation in the war. In another incident, a group of English vigilantes attacked several homes in Wamesit, killing one man and wounding five women in children. When, in October of 1675, the English interned many praying Indians on Deer Island without food or shelter, many of the praying Indians of Wamesit fled north to shelter with Pennacook kin in northern New England.

Despite maintaining a neutral stance in the conflict, the Pennacooks of Wamesit returned after the war to find Wamesit occupied by settlers in their absence, and were forced to relocate upstream to Wickasauke (later Tyng) Island. After the war, interest increased among English settlers in obtaining deeds for land from their former Native inhabitants when the creation of the Dominion of New England annulled previous colonial charters. In this setting, in 1685 and 1686, Pennacook sachem Wannalancit and several other native inhabitants of Wamesit formally deeded all the land in Wamesit to English settlers Jonathan Tyng, Daniel and Thomas Henchman, and Jerathmell Bowers.

== Industrial development ==
Within less than a year of obtaining deeds for the land of Wamesit, Tyng, Bowers, and the Hinchmans formed a corporation to share ownership of the Wamesit land with a group of roughly 50 other Englishmen. After a period of corporate ownership by the Proprietors of Wamesit Neck, Wamesit was annexed into Chelmsford in 1725 or 1726 as East Chelmsford.

In 1792, a new corporation, the Proprietors of Locks and Canals, was chartered by the Massachusetts General Court to bypass the Pawtucket Falls and make the Merrimack River navigable in order for boats and timber rafts from New Hampshire to reach the shipbuilding industry on the Massachusetts coast. Its first shareholder was Dudley Atkins Tyng, an heir to the Tyng family that had once formed the Proprietors of Wamesit Neck. This corporation would build the Pawtucket Canal.

When the Boston Associates determined to build an industrial center at Pawtucket Falls to take advantage of its hydropower potential, they obtained a majority stake of the still extant Proprietors of the Locks and Canals in 1822, purchasing all the land between the Pawtucket Canal to the Merrimack and Concord Rivers. When East Chelmsford separated to become the town of Lowell in 1826, the former Wamesit territory became the nucleus of the town and later city of Lowell.

== Notable residents ==
- Wenepoykin (1616–1684), Sachem of the Naumkeag people who moved to Wamesit after King Philip's War
