= Praying town =

Settlements established in New England

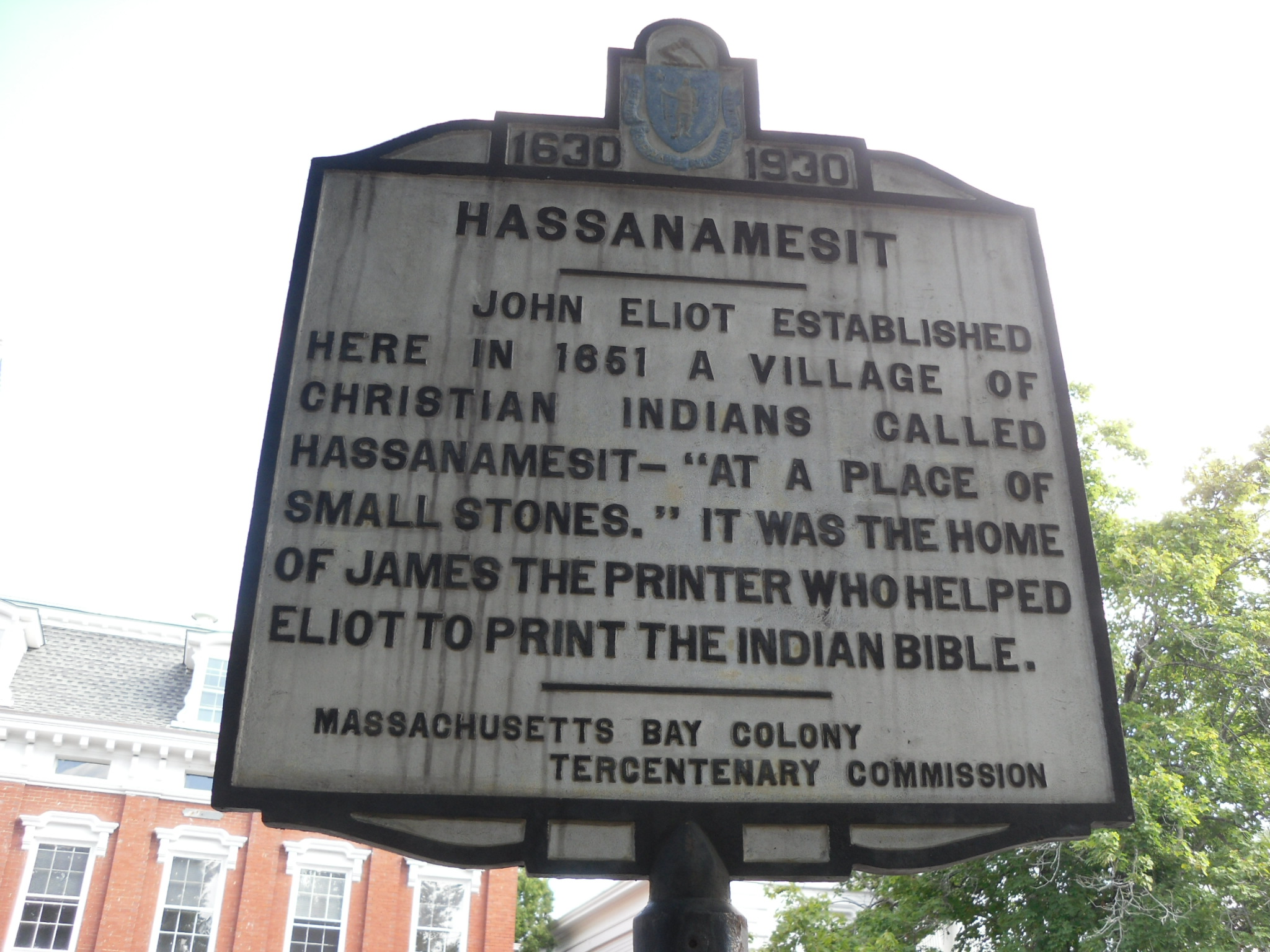
Hassanamessit historical marker

Praying towns were settlements established by colonial authorities in the New England Colonies from 1646 to 1675 in an effort to convert local Native Americans to Christianity. The Native people who moved into the towns were known as Praying Indians. Before 1674 the villages were the most ambitious experiment in converting Native Americans to Christianity in the Thirteen Colonies, and led to the creation of the first books in an Algonquian language, including the first Bible printed in British North America. During King Philip's War from 1675 to 1678, many praying towns were depopulated, in part due to the forced internment of praying Indians on Deer Island, many of whom died during the winter of 1675. After the war, many of the originally praying towns which were allotted were never reestablished, however some praying towns remained. Living descendants in New England trace their ancestry to residents of praying towns.

== History ==
John Eliot was an English colonist and Puritan minister who played an important role in the establishment of praying towns. In the 1630s and 1640s, Eliot worked with bilingual indigenous Algonquians including John Sassamon, an orphan of the Smallpox pandemic of 1633, and Cockenoe, an enslaved Montauk prisoner of the Pequot War, to translate several Christian works, eventually including the Bible, into Massachusett. Having learned quite a bit of Massachusett, Eliot began preaching and practicing evangelism among the Neponset band of Massachusetts, but was first well received when preaching at in 1646 at Nonantum in present day Newton, meaning "place of rejoicing" in Massachusett. The sermon led to a friendship with Waban (Nipmuc, c. 1604 – c. 1685), who became the first Native American in Massachusetts to convert to Christianity.

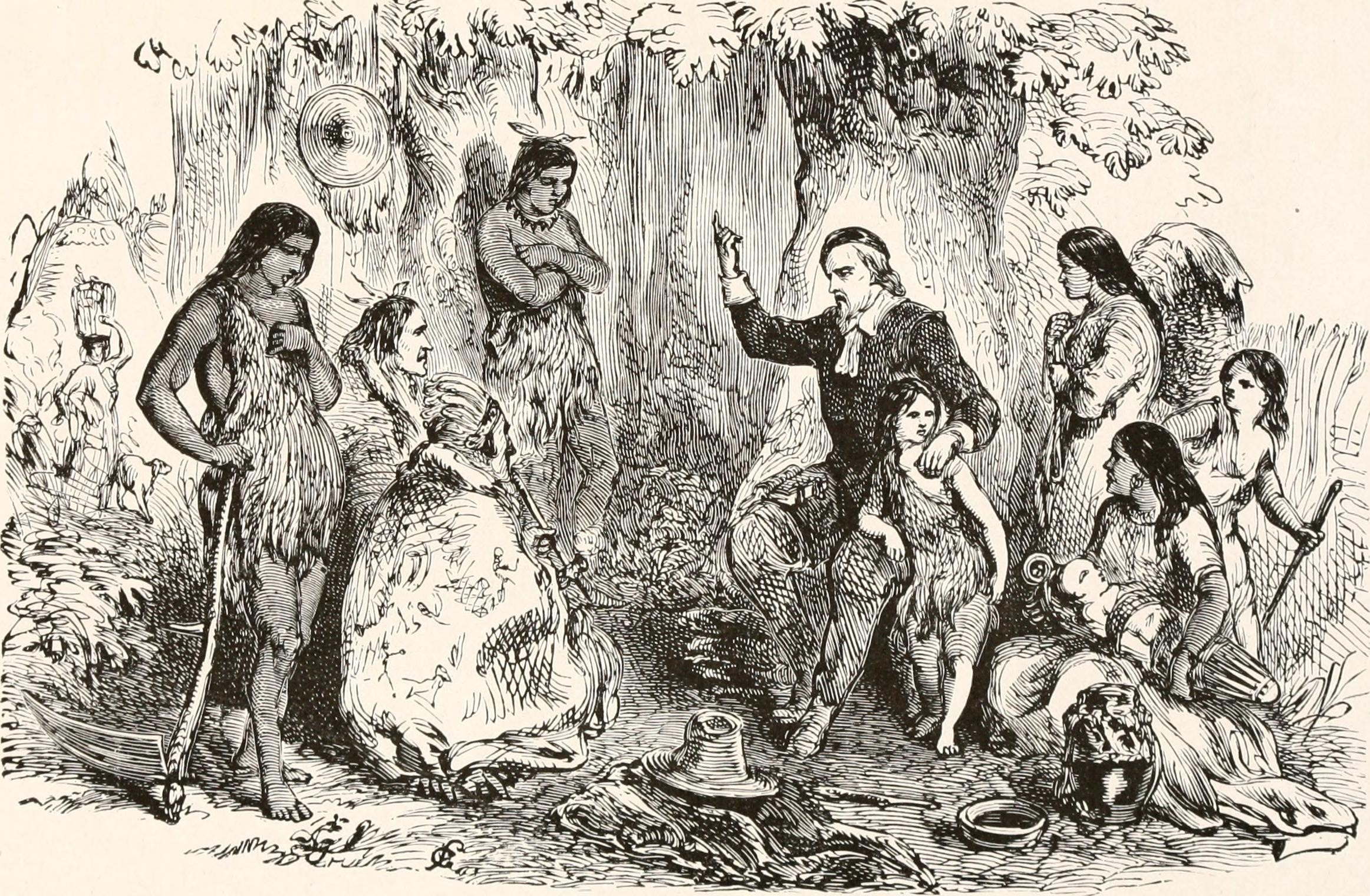
A recreation of the Indians of New England being preached to by Reverend John Eliot

News of Eliot's evangelism reached England, and in 1649, Cromwell's Parliament passed an Act creating the Society for the Propagation of the Gospel in New England, which would fund the establishment of an Indian College at Harvard and a press in Cambridge for printing Eliot's Christian commentaries in Massachusett.

Between 1651 and 1675, the General Court of the Massachusetts Bay Colony had established 14 praying towns. The first two praying towns of Natick (est. 1651) and Ponkapoag (est. 1654), were primarily populated by Massachusett people. Wamesit was established for the Pawtucket, who were part of the Pennacook confederacy. The other praying towns were established as Nipmuc outposts including Wabquasset, Quinnetusset, and Maanexit. Quaboag, far from the other settlements, was never established due to the outbreak of King Philip's War.

== List of Praying Towns ==
=== Massachusetts Bay Colony ===
1. Chaubunagungamaug
2. Hassanamessit
3. Manexit
4. Manchaug
5. Magunkaquog
6. Nashoba
7. Natick
8. Okommakamesitt
9. Pakachoag
10. Ponkapoag
11. Quaboag
12. Quinnetusset
13. Waushakum
14. Wabaquasset
15. Waentug
16. Wamesit

=== Plymouth Colony ===
The Plymouth, Connecticut, and Rhode Island Colonies also established praying towns. The following list is adapted from a 1674 list by Puritan pastor Daniel Gookin.

1. Acushnet. A village of Praying Indians in 1698 "Acchusnutt" is said to have been the Indian name of New Bedford.
2. Ashimuit
3. Gay Head
4. Herring Pond (Plymouth)
5. Potanumaquut
6. Manamoyik
7. Sawkattuket
8. Nantucket
9. Nobsquassit
10. Nukkehkummees. Old Dartmouth contained the following praying settlements: Nukkehkummees, Acushnet (New Bedford), Assameekq, Cooxit or Acoaxet (Westport) and Sakonnet (Little Compton). Adjacent was Cooxissett (probably Rochester).
11. Matakees
12. Weequakut
13. Satuit
14. Pawpoesit
15. Mashpee
16. Wakoquet
17. Codtaninut
18. Weesquobs
19. Pispogutt
20. Wawayontat
21. Sokones
22. Cotuhkikut
23. Namasket

=== Connecticut ===
1. Maanexit
2. Quinnatisset
3. Wabaquasset

== Purpose ==
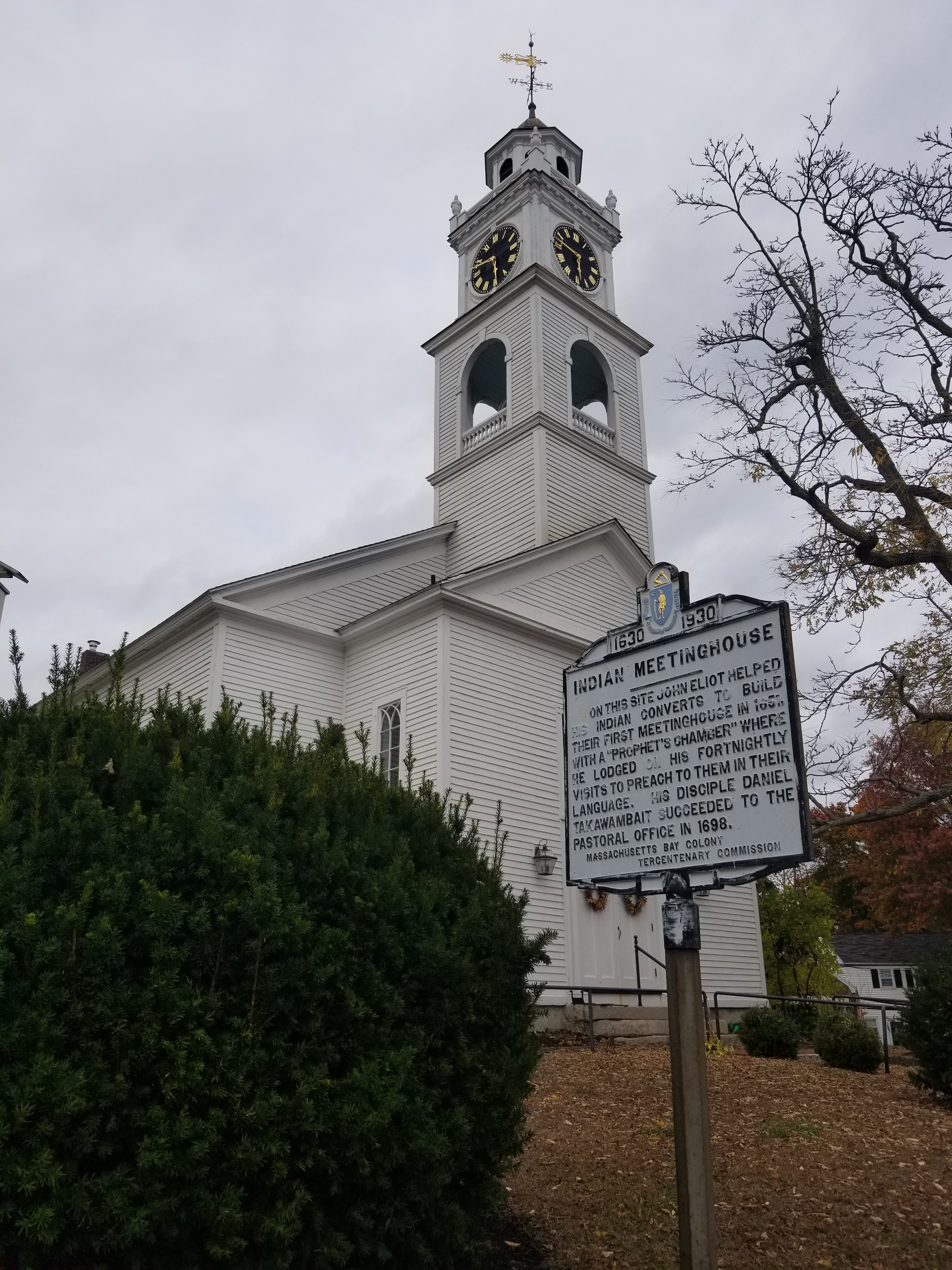
Eliot Church and a historic plaque on the site of the First Indian meetinghouse in the praying town of Natick, Massachusetts. John Eliot and Daniel Takawambait served as pastors there.

The Puritan missionaries' goal in creating praying towns was to convert Native Americans to Christianity and also adopt European customs and farming techniques. They were expected to give up own cultural lifeways, attire, religion, and anything else that the colonists considered "uncivilized." The Massachusetts General Court recognized the work of Eliot and helped to establish additional praying towns.

== Refuge from war ==
Some Natives converted because they believed it might increase their legitimacy in the eyes of the colonists and thus recognition of their rights to their land. Because of intertribal and intratribal strife and conflict with colonists, some of the Native Americans considered the praying towns as refuges from warfare. Other tribes had been all but destroyed from disease and famine and possibly looked to Christianity and the Puritan way of life as an answer to their suffering, when their traditional beliefs did not seem to have helped them. Other Natives joined the towns because they had no other option economically or politically.

After King Philip's War in 1677, the General Court disbanded 10 of the original 14 towns. They placed the rest under the supervision of colonists. Many communities did survive and retained their own religious and education systems.

== Failed assimilation: The last years of Praying Towns ==
While praying towns had some successes, they never reached the level which John Eliot had hoped for. The Puritans were pleased with the conversions, but Praying Indians were still considered second-rate citizens and never gained the degree of trust or respect from colonists which they had hoped conversion would grant them. It has also been argued that the Natives had a difficult time adjusting to the impersonal society of colonial America, since theirs had been built upon relationships and reciprocity, while that of the colonists were more structured and institutionalized. According to this view, this difference made it hard for Natives to see the institutionalized structures as a whole, and John Eliot had failed to see the need for adaptations appropriate for smoother transitions.

Eventually these towns were depopulated and eventually abandoned. Many of the praying Indians were sent to an internment camp on Deer Island. There many Native Americans, Including Praying Indians of the praying Towns as well as Native Americans who were imprisoned on the Island during the King Philips War. During the first couple of winters on the island many of the Native American prisoners died of starvation and exposure. Colonists released the remaining survivors in 1678, and some were then sold off into slavery.

== Self-governing ==
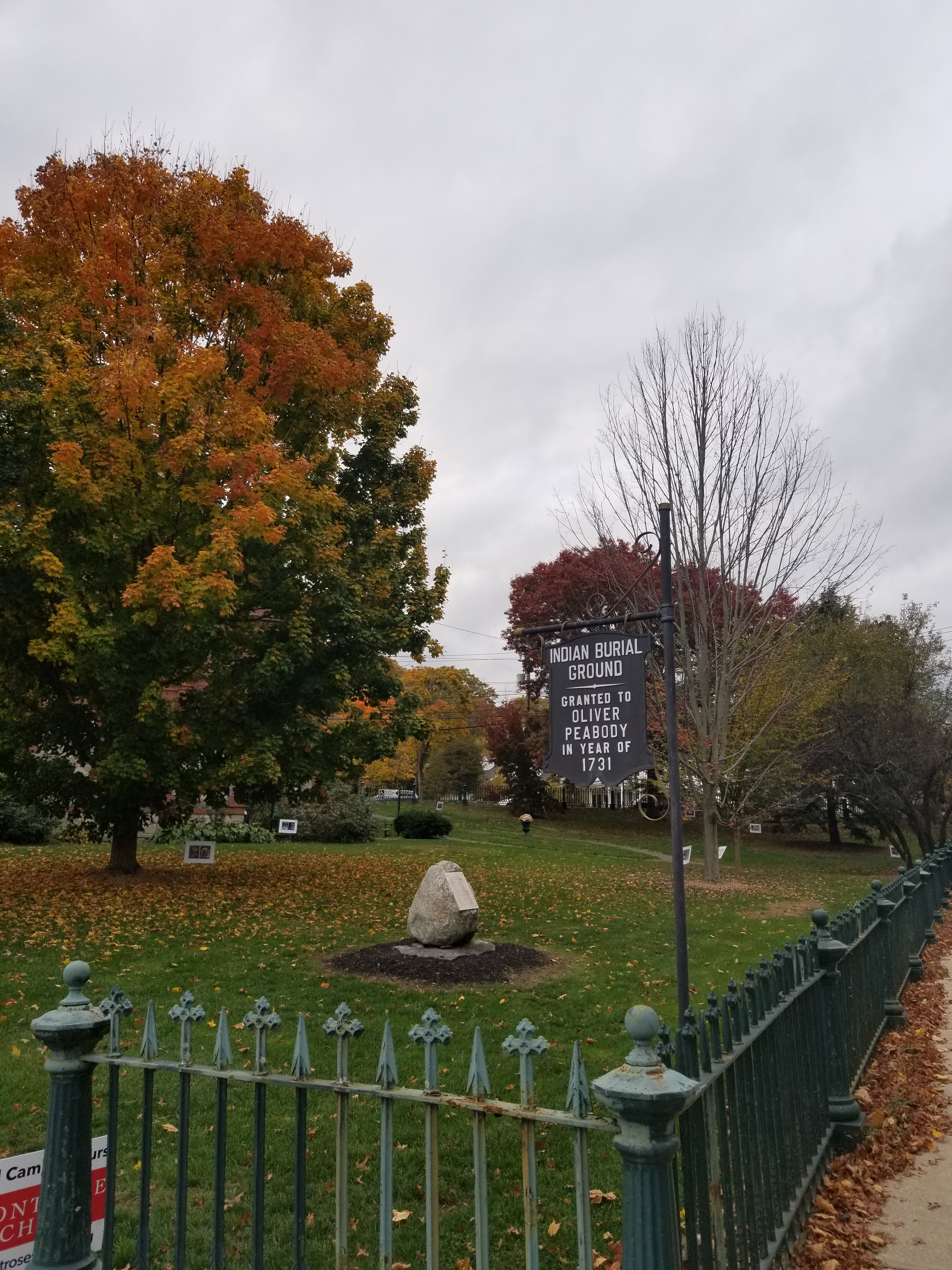
Indian Burial Ground in Natick Praying town

Other historians have noted that the Praying Indian communities exercised self-government by electing their own rulers and officials. This system exhibited a degree of continuity with their precontact social system. While English-style offices, such as constables and Justices of the Peace were introduced, they were often designated with names identical to those of traditional Native American offices. The elected officials were often chosen from the ranks of the established tribal leadership. In some cases, Native hereditary rulers retained power. The communities also used their own languages as the language of administration, producing an abundance of legal and administrative documents that survive to this day. However, their self-government was gradually curtailed in the course of the 18th and 19th centuries, and their languages eventually became extinct. Most of the original "Praying Towns" declined due to epidemics and to the loss of communal land property during the centuries after their foundation.

== See also ==
- Indian Reductions
- Mission Indians
- Praying Indian
- Stockbridge Indians
