= Daniel Gookin =

English-born soldier and colonial politician (1612–1687)

Major General Daniel Gookin II
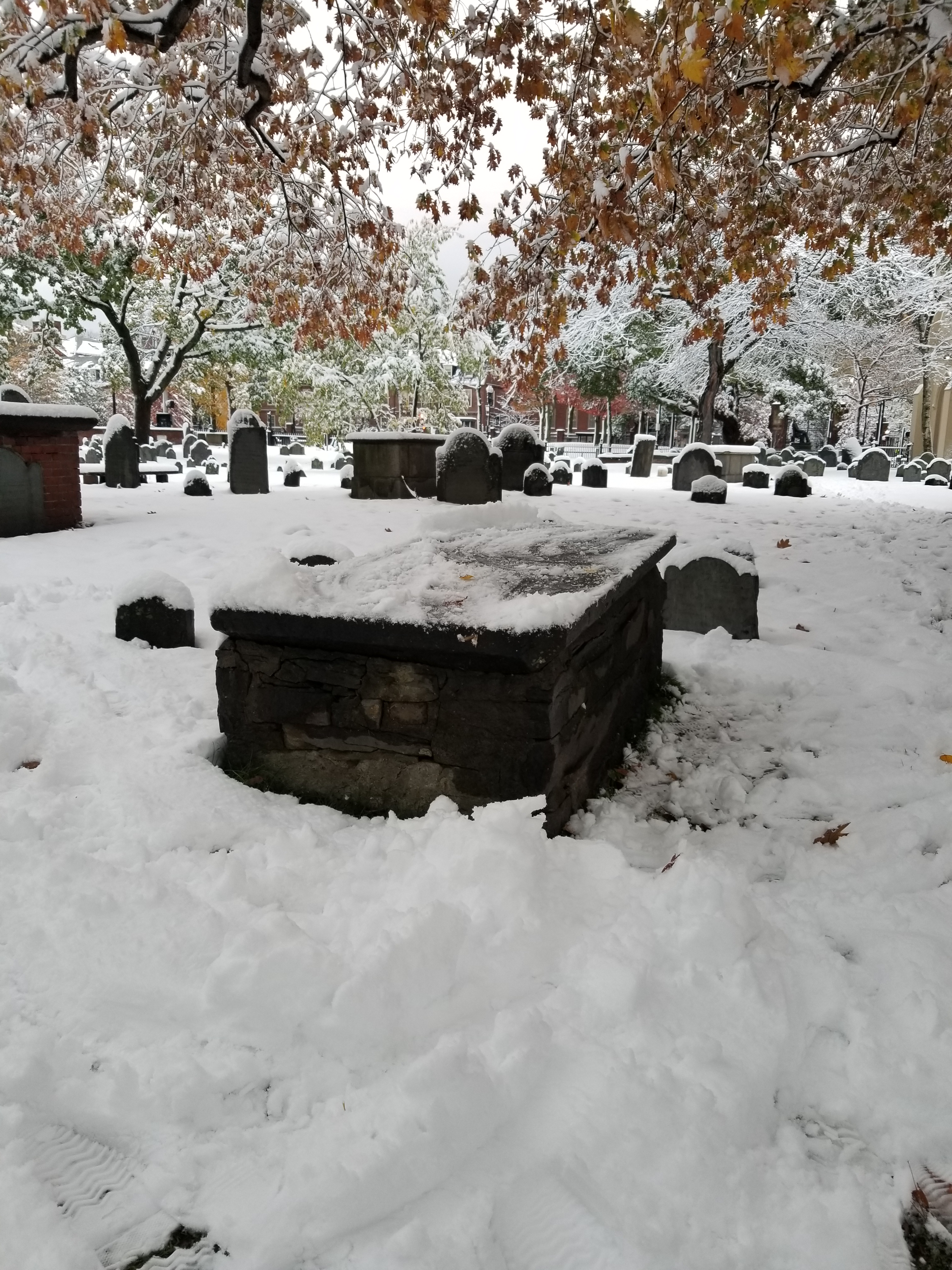
- Grave of Daniel Gookin in Old Burying Ground
- Born: 1612; Kent, England
- Died: March 19, 1687 (aged 74–75); Boston, Massachusetts Bay Colony
- Burial place: Old Burying Ground (Cambridge, Massachusetts)
- Other name: Danyell Gookin
- Works: Historical Collections of the Indians in New England (1674); ...Christian Indians in New England in the Years 1675, 1676, 1677 (1836)
- Relatives: Daniel Gookin Jr. (son)

Burgess of Upper Norfolk County, Virginia Colony
- In office 1641/2–?

Speaker of the House of Deputies, Massachusetts
- In office 1651–1651?

Daniel Gookin II (1612 – 19 March 1687) was an English settler of Virginia and Massachusetts, and a writer on the subject of American Indians.

== Early life ==
Daniel Gookin II was born, perhaps in County Cork, Ireland, in the latter part of 1612, the first son of Daniel Gookin I (sometimes called Gookin Sr.) of County Kent and County Cork and his wife, Mary Byrd. He was baptized 6 December 1612 at the church of St Augustine the Less in Bristol. By 1616 his father was living in Carrigaline, Ireland (Munster Plantation), where Gookin probably spent his childhood, later being sent for education to England.

On 1 February 1630/1, shortly after his eighteenth birthday, living at his father's plantation in Newport News, Virginia. Gookin was indentured to Thomas Addison, second manager of the Marie's Mount plantation. On Addison's retirement, he granted Daniel 150 acres (0.61 km^{2}) of land.

No record of Gookin's first marriage has been found; on 11 November 1639 a license was granted for the marriage of Daniel Gookin, Gent., of the parish of St. Sepulchre, London, a widower, and Mary Dolling, of the parish of St. Dunstan in the West, London.

Between his two voyages to Virginia, it is assumed that Gookin was in military service, as he is referred to as a Kentish "souldier" by Capt. Edward Johnson in his Wonder Working Providence, and "Captain" in Greer's list of immigrants to Virginia.

== In Virginia ==
In early 1641 Daniel Gookin, his wife Mary, and their infant son Samuel set sail for Virginia and took up residence at the Nansemond plantation. He was made a Burgess and represented Upper Norfolk County in the Grand Assembly which met in Jamestown on 12 January 1641/2. He received a grant of 2,500 acres (10 km^{2}) in the upper county of Norfolk on the northwest of the Nansemond River on 29 December 1637, and a further 1,400 acres (5.7 km^{2}) on the Rappahannock River on 4 November 1642.

On 24 May 1642 a letter was sent to the Puritan elders of the Church in Boston in the Colony of Massachusetts, asking for ministers, who were in short supply in Virginia. William Thompson of Braintree, John Knowles of Emmanuel College, and Thomas James of New Haven were sent to Virginia. Gookin was among those welcoming them, and became closely associated with Thompson. However, Governor William Berkeley, an adherent to the Church of England, gave them a frigid reception, and at the next meeting of the Assembly in March 1642/3, an act of conformity was passed. Knowles and James left Virginia for New England in April. Thompson, accompanied by Gookin, emigrated in the summer of 1643 to Maryland, where, though under Catholic rule, non-conformists were welcome and tolerated, and where Gookin acquired land near the South and Severn Rivers, near the site of Annapolis. Gookin's brother John died at Lynn Haven early in November 1643; Gookin, no longer bound by any strong ties to Virginia, left his three plantations in the charge of servants and sailed for Boston in May 1644 with his wife and his infant daughter Mary (his son Samuel having died). They arrived in Boston on 20 May 1644, and six days following he was admitted to membership in the First Church. He resided initially at Roxbury, where he was a near neighbor of Rev. John Eliot, Sr., pastor of the First Church of Roxbury and known as the "Apostle to the Indians". Gookin's daughter Elizabeth (baptized 1645) (who was later to marry John Eliot's son, then Edmund Quincy (1628–1698)), and Hannah (baptized 1646) were born at Roxbury, and Gookin was one of the founders of the free grammar school established there in 1645. He was appointed a deputy from Roxbury to the General Court. On 6 April 1648 Gookin sold 500 acres (2.0 km^{2}) of his plantation on the Rappahannock to Capt. Thomas Burbage.

== In New England ==
Coat of Arms of Daniel Gookin

In July 1648, the Gookin family removed to Cambridge, where he was appointed Captain of the Trained Band, a position he held for the next forty years.

In the spring of 1649, Gookin was chosen as Deputy from Cambridge to the General Court held in Boston. In July 1650, he was in London on public business; he returned in the spring of 1651, and on 7 May he was chosen Speaker. At the election on 26 May 1652 he was chosen an Assistant, one of the Council of eighteen magistrates to whom, with the Governor and a Deputy Governor, the government of the colony was entrusted. Except for a period early in 1676, when he suffered defeat largely because of his sympathetic treatment of Indians during King Philip's War (1675–78), Gookin was re-elected to this position continuously for a period of thirty-five years.

Gookin again returned to London, where Oliver Cromwell had been proclaimed Protector, and Daniel's cousin Vincent Gookin was a member of the first Protectorate Parliament. Cromwell asked that Daniel urge his fellows at Boston to become planters in Jamaica; however, Gookin was unsuccessful at gaining colonists, and returned to England. Gookin became Collector of Customs at Dunkirk in March 1658/9. When King Charles II returned to Dover, Daniel fled to New England with the regicides General Edward Whalley and Colonel William Goffe. The regicides took up residence at Cambridge, which provoked the English government to appoint a board of commissioners to visit New England and ensure loyalty to the crown. The controversy was managed by the Massachusetts General Court who, largely due to the efforts of Gookin and Thomas Danforth, failed to accomplish their goals.

In 1665, the attention of the General Court was brought to the rich lands in the vicinity of Lake Quinsigamond, which Rev. John Eliot had already visited. A committee on which Daniel Gookin served was appointed to view the land and to report "whether it be capable of making a village, and what number of families may be there accommodated, and if they find it fit for a plantation." In the report of this committee made October 20, 1668, the "good chestnut tree" and meadow land was recommended. The General Court accepted this report and appointed Captain Gookin of Cambridge, Daniel Henchman of Boston, Thomas Prentice of Woburn, and Lieutenant Richard Beers of Watertown to plan for a settlement. After purchasing the land from the natives for "twelve pounds lawful money," lots were assigned, and the actual settlement began in 1673. Lots were given to Captains Gookin, Henchman, Prentice, and Lieutenant Beers. Houses were built and then the work suddenly ceased, owing to the outbreak of King Philip's War. All of the buildings erected by the settlers were burned, and Lieutenant Beers was killed in the fight. The settlement was deserted. A second attempt was made in 1685, and Captain John Wing was appointed to fill the place made vacant by the death of Lieutenant Beers. On the petition of Captains Gookin, Henchman, Prentice, and Wing, the settlement was named Worcester. This second settlement was destined to be even as disastrous as the first. Indian outbreaks marked the years between 1686 and 1713—the date of the third and successful settlement of Worcester.

Besides his attendance at the sessions of the General Court and at the meetings of the Governor and Council, he served on committees to audit the Treasurer's (John Hull's) accounts, to treat with the mintmaster, to draw up orders concerning the militia, and to visit Harvard College and examine the treasurer's accounts. He served Cambridge as Selectman from 1660 to 1672, and was appointed the first Superintendent of the Praying Indians. In this capacity he traveled to Indian settlements, often accompanied by his friend Rev. Eliot. Gookin wrote two books on the Indians: Historical Collections of the Indians in New England (completed in 1674, published by the Massachusetts Historical Society, 1792), and The Doings and Sufferings of the Christian Indians (completed in 1677, published in 1836). He wrote also a History of New England, but only portions of this have survived.

== Last years ==
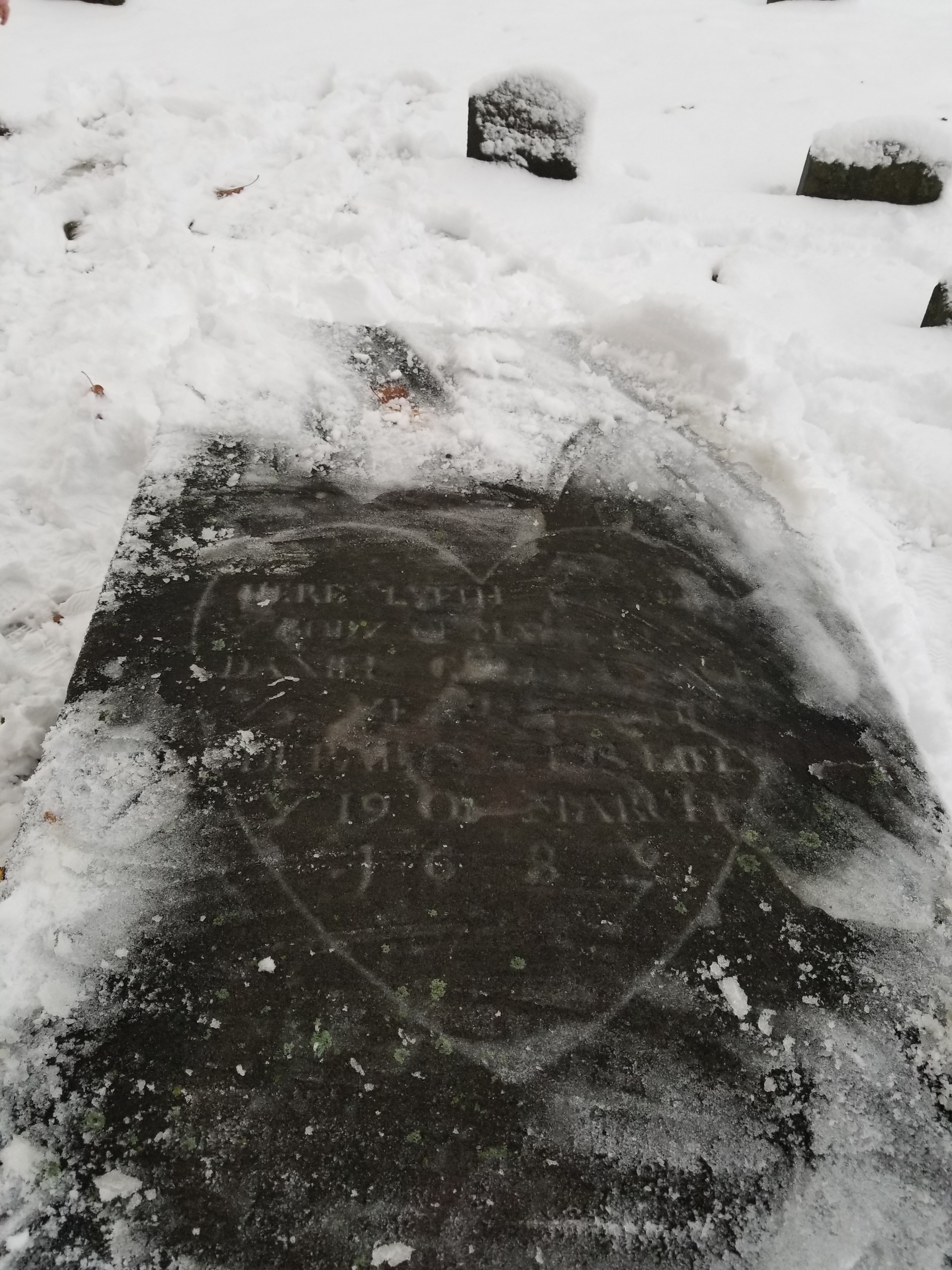
Gookin's tomb is topped with a heart-shaped inset

The colony passed laws banning all printing in Massachusetts, except in Cambridge, and then permitting only licensed publications. In 1662 Gookin and Rev. Jonathan Mitchell were appointed as the first licensers of the press, but Gookin declined the position.

The king, meanwhile, asked that the colonists submit themselves to him with regard to charter rights; Gookin opposed sending delegates to England, a position that carried the day, and won him great popularity. On 11 May 1681, he was elected Major-General, the Commander-in-Chief of the military forces of the colony. Though he continued, by argument and resistance, to oppose British encroachments upon the colonists' political and commercial liberties, his last year was darkened by the abrogation of the charter government by King James II in 1686.

Gookin died on 19 March 1686/7, and was buried in the Old Burying Ground (Cambridge, Massachusetts), the town's main burial site opposite Harvard's Johnson gate. His table tomb is topped with a heart-shaped inset, probably the work of the Old Boston Stone Cutter, which is very similar to the one for Thomas Savage in King's Chapel Burying Ground, Boston.

== Family ==
Daniel Gookin, son of Daniel Gookin and Mary Byrd,

- married [1] before 1639;
- married [2] Mary Dolling, by licence dated 11 November 1639, by whom he had the following children:

1. Samuel Gookin, b. probably 1640 in England; came with parents to Virginia and d. before 1644
2. Mary Gookin (1642-1702)
3. Elizabeth Gookin (1645-1700), who married first, in 1666, Rev. John Eliot, Jr. (1636-1668) and second, in 1680, Edmund Quincy (1628–1698)
4. Hannah Gookin, baptized Roxbury, Mass. 9 May 1647; died 2 August 1647
5. Daniel Gookin, b. Cambridge, Mass. 8 April 1649; died 3 September 1649
6. Daniel Gookin (again) (1650-1718)
7. Samuel Gookin (again) (1652-1730)
8. Solomon Gookin, b. Cambridge 20 June 1654; died 16 July 1654
9. Nathaniel Gookin (1656-1692)

Between Mary Dolling Gookin's death in 1683 and his third marriage, Gookin's household consisted of himself, son Nathaniel — pastor of the First Church, Cambridge — and his 16-year-old grandson, John Eliot, son of Elizabeth Gookin by her first marriage to Rev. John Eliot, Jr.

- married [3], before 13 August 1685, to Mrs. Hannah (Tyng) Savage, daughter of Edward and Mary (Sears) Tyng and widow of Habijah Savage.
