= Josiah Standish =

American colonial

Capt. Josiah Standish, son of Capt. Myles Standish (1584- 1656), and Barbara Standish (1588-1659). He was born about 1633 in Plymouth Colony, Massachusetts. He died on 19 March 1690 in Preston, New London County, Connecticut. A captain in the Plymouth Colony militia who participated in King Philip's War, Standish, along with Captain Benjamin Church, led a raiding party that tracked the Wampanoag chief, Metacomet to Mt. Hope, Rhode Island. Finding the chief hiding in a swamp, one of his men, an Indian named John Alderman shot Metacomet. He married first in 1656 Mary Dingley of Marshfield, Massachusetts, who died 6 months later. Second, he married Sarah Allen (daughter of Samuel Allen) around 1660. Josiah and Sarah Standish's children were: Josiah, (Reverend, lived and died in Stafford, Connecticut) Mary, Mehitable, Martha, Samuel, Israel, Lois, and Mercy Standish.

According to Mayflower Families Through Five Generations (2007), "Josiah Standish: born circa 1633; died at Preston CT, 19 March 1690; married 1) at Marshfield, 19 December 1654, Mary Dingley; they had no children. He married 2) after 7 March 1655/56, Sarah Allen and they had eight children: Mary, Martha, Myles, Josiah, Samuel, Israel, Lois and Mercy Standish."
