= Awashonks =

Chief of the Sakonnet

Awashonks (Note: Her name is also spelled Awashunckes, Awashunkes or Awasoncks.) (fl. mid-late 17th c.) was a saunkskwa, a female sachem (chief) of the Sakonnet (also spelled Saconet) tribe in Rhode Island. She lived near the southern edge of the Plymouth Colony on Patuxet homelands, not far from Narragansett Bay, near what is currently known by settlers as Little Compton, Rhode Island. In the mid-seventeenth century, English settlers of Plymouth Colony invaded her lands. While she had allied herself to the English to increase her power, English colonization eroded her standing among both the English and the Sakonnet. Awashonks is known for her special talent for negotiation and diplomacy, which helped include the Sakonnets among Native communities who received amnesty from colonists.

== Awashonks as sachem ==
Awashonks became a saunkskwa not by inheritance, but through quality of leadership. She was referred to as a saunkskwa, or female chief. During her tenure, she was challenged by both rivals within the Sakonnet as well as English colonists.

== Plymouth Colony ==
Awashonks was not diplomatically allied with the English until July 1671, when Plymouth leaders called her and other Indian leaders to a meeting and threatened to send an army to fight them if they refused to attend. Awashonks signed the "Articles of Agreement", in which she agreed to surrender guns and Saconet who were accused of inciting trouble. The agreement was also signed by Totatomet and Somagaonet, witnessed by Tattacommett, (a Sakonnet subsachem who later removed to his land in the Elizabeth Islands) Samponcut and Tamoueesam (alias, Jeffrey), on July 24, 1671. Not long after, in August, Awashonks' men signed a paper approving what she had done in accordance with the agreement; only three names are known: Totatomet, Tunuokum, Sausaman. On October 20, 1671 Governor Prince wrote to her, saying that he had received the list of names, and assuring her that the English would befriend her.

Awashonks made appearances in the Plymouth court system. In 1674 Mammanuah, her son, a Sakonnet rival, accused Awashonks of assault. After he had tried to sell land to English settlers, Awashonks ordered men to tie him up and threaten him. The court ruled in Mammanuah's favor, possibly to appease the English land buyers. However, the court, out of respect to Awashonks, reduced her fine to only 5 pounds rather than the 500 pounds that Mammanuah demanded.

Awashonks had two husbands, Wawayeenit and Tatoson. By Tatoson, she had her son Peter Awashanks, or Petonuitt, her daughter, Betty, and Mammanuah, who became reigning sachem and died in 1698. Mamanuah had two sons John and William Mammanuah, and John also had a son named John. Peter Awashanks did not ascend to the sachemdon in part because after King Philip's War he was prohibited from returning to Little Compton and was prevented from crossing the Sippican Line in Rochester along with other younger Sakonnet men. He was eventually given land at Manomet Ponds and the family continued for at least several generations, the name being shortened to Washanks and later simply Shanks. Peter's grandchildren Penelipa, (Penelope), Deborah, Charles and Peter were given land at the Watuppa Reservation in thanks for the Saconnet's help to the English and Benjamin Church in King Philip's War. Two great grandsons named Peter and Abel Washonks were Revolutionary War soldiers in Massachusetts and Connecticut respectively.

Awashonks also had two other sons by a man named Wawayeenit, who may have been the sachem of Nantucket. These sons were names Amos (Samponack) and Simon (Cakawehunt.) She also had two stepsons, also local subsachems named Osohmehun and Popsitigo, also known as Peter and Pope Quanawin. Their descendants would live in Dartmouth and New Bedford until the 1850s, although the name morphed into Quonwell and variants.

== King Philip's War ==
By 1675, the relationship between the English and the Wampanoag was more tense than ever. Metacomet (Sachem of the Wampanoag tribe, also known as King Philip) was trying to build a military coalition to go to war against the Plymouth settlers. Metacomet sent six men to visit Awashonks and convince her to side with him in the fight against the English. The men told her that if she did not, Metacomet would send his men to kill the colonists' cattle and burn their houses on her side of the river - making it appear that one of her people had committed the crime. Awashonks sent for Benjamin Church; when he arrived, there were hundreds of people present and Awashonks was leading a ceremonial dance. Awashonks stopped to see Church, who told her that it was not true that Plymouth was preparing for war (as Metacomet's men had told her). Church advised Awashonks to go to the Governor of Plymouth and join with the English. In part because of aid from leaders such as Awashonks, the English defeated Metacomet in King Philip's War.

== Trials ==
In 1683 Awashonks was called before the Plymouth court, having been accused of helping to kill an infant born to her daughter, Betty. She and Betty convinced the court that the infant was stillborn, but Betty was found guilty of fornication. The court reprimanded Awashonks for having had a woman whipped for announcing that Betty was pregnant.

== Legacy ==
Awashonks appears in official records of New England more than any other Native woman. A boulder was erected in Wilbur Wood, Little Compton, Rhode Island in the late nineteenth century, during a period of romantic settler interest in Awashonks' story stemming from their preoccupation with the myth of the "Vanishing Indian." The engraving reads, "In memory of Awashonks Queen of Sogkonate & friend of the white man."

== See also ==
- List of Native American politicians
- Native American women in politics
