= King Philip's War =

1675–78 war in New England

- Part of the European colonization of the Americas and the American Indian Wars
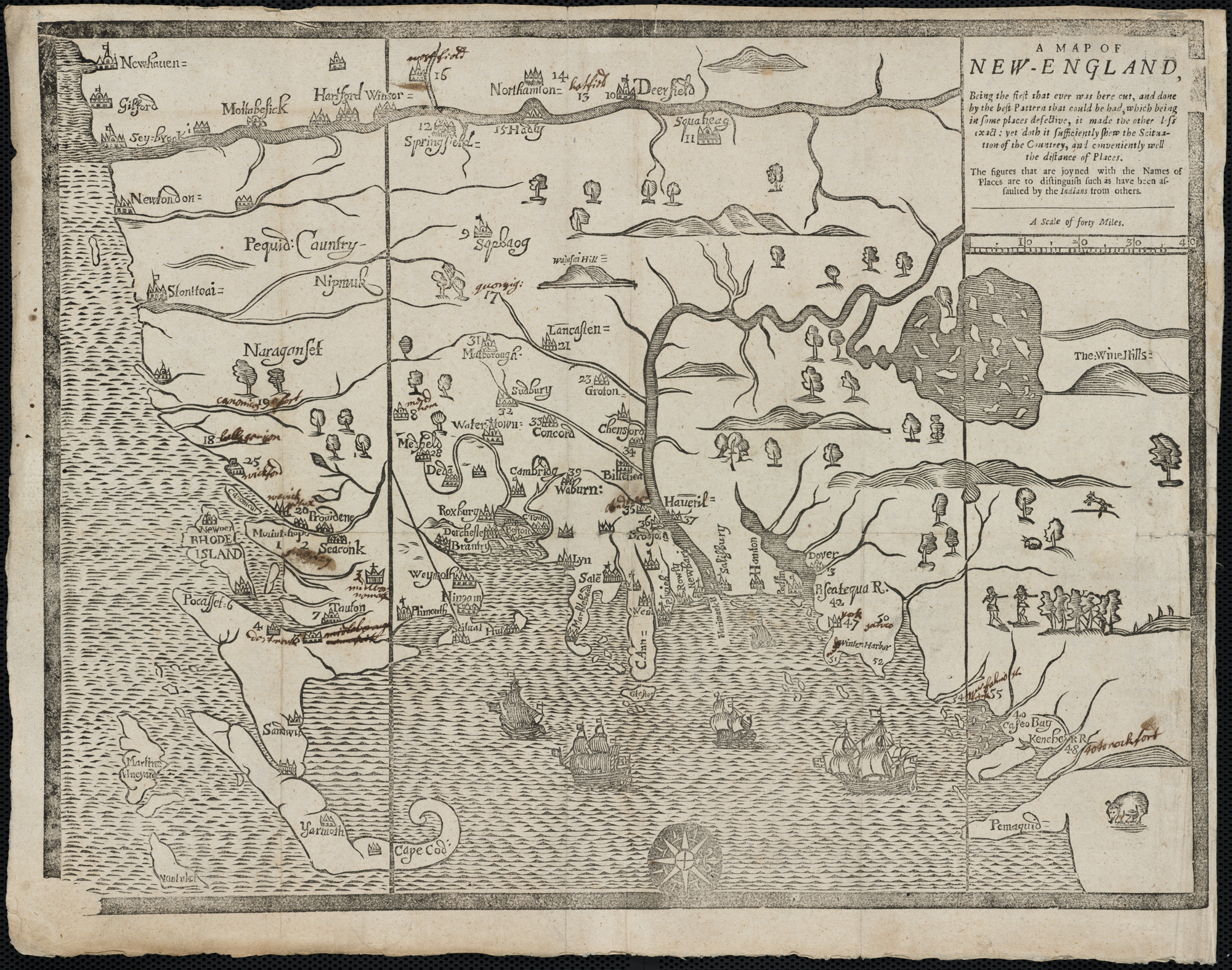
- John Foster's A Map of New England, first published in Narrative of Troubles with the Indians, Boston clergyman William Hubbard's 1677 narrative of the war.
Date	June 20, 1675 – April 12, 1678 (2 years, 9 months, 3 weeks and 2 days)
Location	New England
Result	New England Confederation victory Wabanaki victory in Maine

Belligerents
Wampanoags; Nipmucks; Podunks; Narragansetts; Nashaway; Wabanakis	New England Confederation; Mohegans; Pequots; Mohawks

Commanders and leaders
Metacomet †; Weetamoo †; Canonchet †; Awashonks; Muttawmp; Madockawando; Mogg Hegon	Josiah Winslow; Benjamin Church

Strength
c. 2,000 warriors	c. 3,500 militia

Casualties and losses
c. 5,000+ total dead	c. 2,500+ total dead

King Philip's War (1675–1678) was a colonial war in which a coalition of Algonquian tribes of the Northeastern Woodlands—the Wampanoags, the Pocomtucs, the Nipmucs, and the Narragansetts—fought against the Puritan settlers of the New England Colonies and their Indian allies—the Mohegans, the Pequots, and Christian Indians. The war continued in the most northern reaches of New England until the signing of the Treaty of Casco Bay on April 12, 1678.

The British colonization of the New England began in the 17th century, with roughly 20,000 Puritan settlers establishing and joining colonies in North America—primarily Plymouth Colony and the Massachusetts Bay Colony—in the Great Migration of 1620–40 alone. Massasoit, chief sachem of the indigenous Wampanoag tribe, had made and maintained an agreement with the colonists. Massasoit's younger son Metacom (c. 1638–1676), named King Philip by the settlers, became the sachem in 1662 after the death of his father and his older brother Wamsutta (c. 1634–1662). Metacom, however, forsook his father's alliance between the Wampanoags and the colonists after repeated violations by the latter. The colonists insisted that the 1671 peace agreement should include the surrender of Native guns; then three Wampanoags were hanged in Plymouth Colony in 1675 for the murder of John Sassamon, a Wampanoag schoolmaster and interpreter, which increased tensions. Native raiding parties attacked homesteads and villages throughout Massachusetts, Rhode Island, Connecticut, and Maine over the next six months, and the colonial militia retaliated. The colonies assembled the largest army that New England had yet mustered, consisting of 1,000 militia and 150 Native allies. Governor Josiah Winslow marshaled them to attack the Narragansetts in November 1675. They attacked and burned Native villages throughout Rhode Island territory, culminating with the attack on the Narragansetts' main fort in the Great Swamp Fight. An estimated 600 Narragansetts were killed, and their coalition was taken over by Narragansett sachem Canonchet. They pushed back the borders of the Massachusetts Bay, Plymouth, and Rhode Island colonies, burning towns as they went, including Providence in March 1676. However, the colonial militia overwhelmed the Native coalition following the Mohawk decision to side with the colonial alliance. By the end of the war, the Wampanoags and their Narragansett allies were almost completely destroyed. On August 12, 1676, Metacom fled to Mount Hope where he was killed by the militia. However, fighting by the Abenaki continued in the New England-Acadia borderlands.

The war was the greatest calamity in seventeenth-century New England and is considered by many to be the deadliest war in Colonial American history. In the space of little more than a year, 12 of the region's towns were destroyed and many more were damaged, the economy of the Plymouth and Rhode Island Colonies was ruined and their population was decimated, losing one-tenth of all men available for military service. (Note: Schultz and Tougias argue that 600 out of the about 80,000 colonists (0.75%) and 3,000 out of 10,000 Native Americans (30%) lost their lives in the war.) Hundreds of Wampanoags and their allies were publicly executed or enslaved, and the Wampanoags were left effectively landless. At the same time, more than half of New England's towns were involved in the conflict and it would not be until 1700 that English colonists would occupy their pre-war borders again.

King Philip's War was the last-ditch effort by Native tribes to expel the colonists from New England. Instead, it turned out to be the beginning of the development of an independent American identity. The New England colonists faced their enemies without support from any European government or military, and this began to give them a group identity separate and distinct from England.

== Names ==
The war is sometimes called the First Indian War, Metacom's War, Pometacomet's Rebellion, or Metacom's Rebellion.

The name King Philip's War refers to the Pokanoket chief and sachem of the Wampanoag, Metacom (c. 1638–1676), sometimes referred to as 'Metacomet' or 'Pometacom'. 'Philip' was the name the English gave to Metacom when he and his brother appeared before an English court in 1660.

== Historical context ==
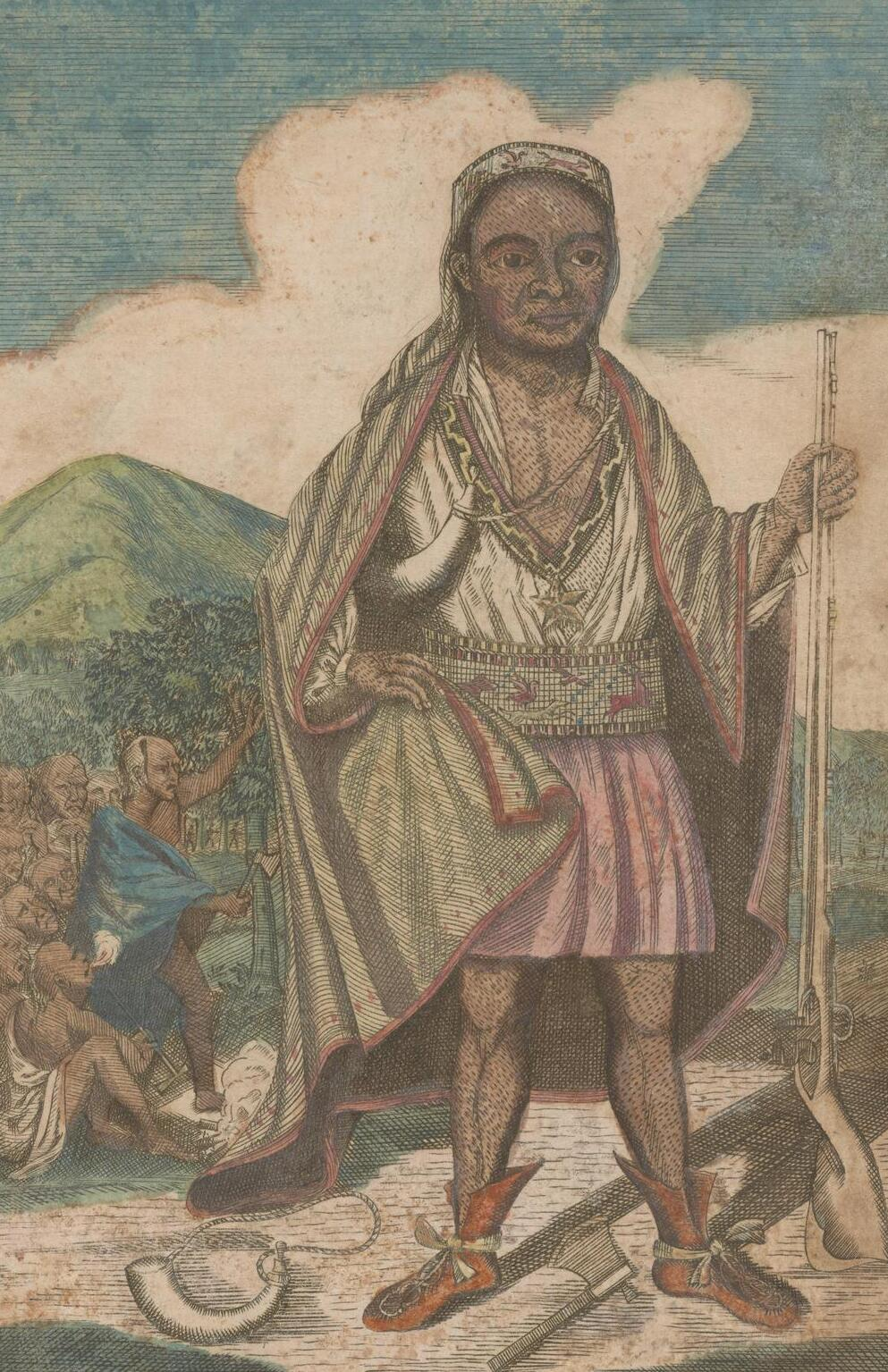
Metacom (c. 1638–1676), also known as King Philip, chief Sachem of the Wampanoag and leader of the campaign against the English colonists, as imagined by Paul Revere in 1772.

The British colonization of the New England began in the 17th century. In what is sometimes called the Great Migration, roughly 20,000 Puritans migrated to establish and join British colonies in North America from 1620 to 1640, primarily Plymouth Colony and the Massachusetts Bay Colony.

The early Plymouth Colony claimed preemptive rights to the entirety of Wampanoag country through early alliances with some Native leaders, like Squanto (Tisquantam) and Massasoit (Ousamequin). However, English claim to the land relied entirely on misinterpretations of Native leadership, which viewed Ousamequin as the Native "king" of the land, despite the existence of other territorial claims under local leaders like Namumpum (Weetamoo).

Subsequent colonists founded Salem, Boston, and many small towns around Massachusetts Bay between 1628 and 1640, during a time of increased English immigration. The colonists progressively expanded throughout the territories of the several Algonquian-speaking tribes in the region.

Prior to King Philip's War, tensions fluctuated between Native tribes and the colonists. The Narragansetts fought alongside the English colonists in the Pequot War and participated in the Mystic massacre but were horrified afterwards. With the defeat of the Pequots, Narragansett leader Miantonomoh gathered groups of Algonquians together in the 1640s in the hope that they could face the colonists together. He was captured by colonists in Connecticut and executed by Mohegan sachem Uncas, shattering the coalition.

The Rhode Island, Plymouth, Massachusetts Bay, Connecticut, and New Haven colonies each developed separate relations with the Wampanoags, Nipmucs, Narragansetts, Mohegans, Pequots, and other tribes of New England, whose territories historically had differing boundaries. Many of the neighboring tribes had been traditional competitors and enemies. As the colonial population increased, the New Englanders expanded their settlements along the region's coastal plain and up the Connecticut River valley. By 1675, they had established a few small towns in the interior between Boston and the Connecticut River settlements.

Meanwhile, with the death of Ousamequin, Native diplomacy between Native Americans and settlers fell apart, as colonists tried negotiating with Wamsutta in the same role they did with Ousamequin, but while slighting female Native rulers (saunkswkas) of the land. The colonists erroneously claimed Sakonnet and Pocasset land as freely given. This created further tension between colonists and Natives, as colonial Puritan beliefs did not recognize female leaders as legitimate, despite the great power they held within Algonquin societies. On one such occasion of land dispute, saunkswkas Weetamoo and Awashonks appeared in a colonial court to protest illegitimate deeds signed by Wamsutta that gave colonists lands that were not his to give. This conflict strengthened complaints among natives while simultaneously bolstering Plymouth claims to the land and served as an omen for conflict that was yet to come.

Eventually, the Wampanoag tribe under Metacomet's leadership entered into an agreement with the Plymouth Colony and believed that they could rely on the colony for protection. However, in the decades preceding the war, it became clear to them that the treaty did not mean that the Colonists were not allowed to settle in new territories.

=== Failure of diplomacy ===
Metacom became sachem of the Pokanoket and Grand Sachem of the Wampanoag Confederacy in 1662 after the death of his older brother Grand Sachem Wamsutta (called "Alexander" by the colonists), who had succeeded their father Massasoit (d. 1661) as chief. Metacom was well known to the colonists before his ascension as paramount chief to the Wampanoags. But, he ultimately distrusted the colonists.

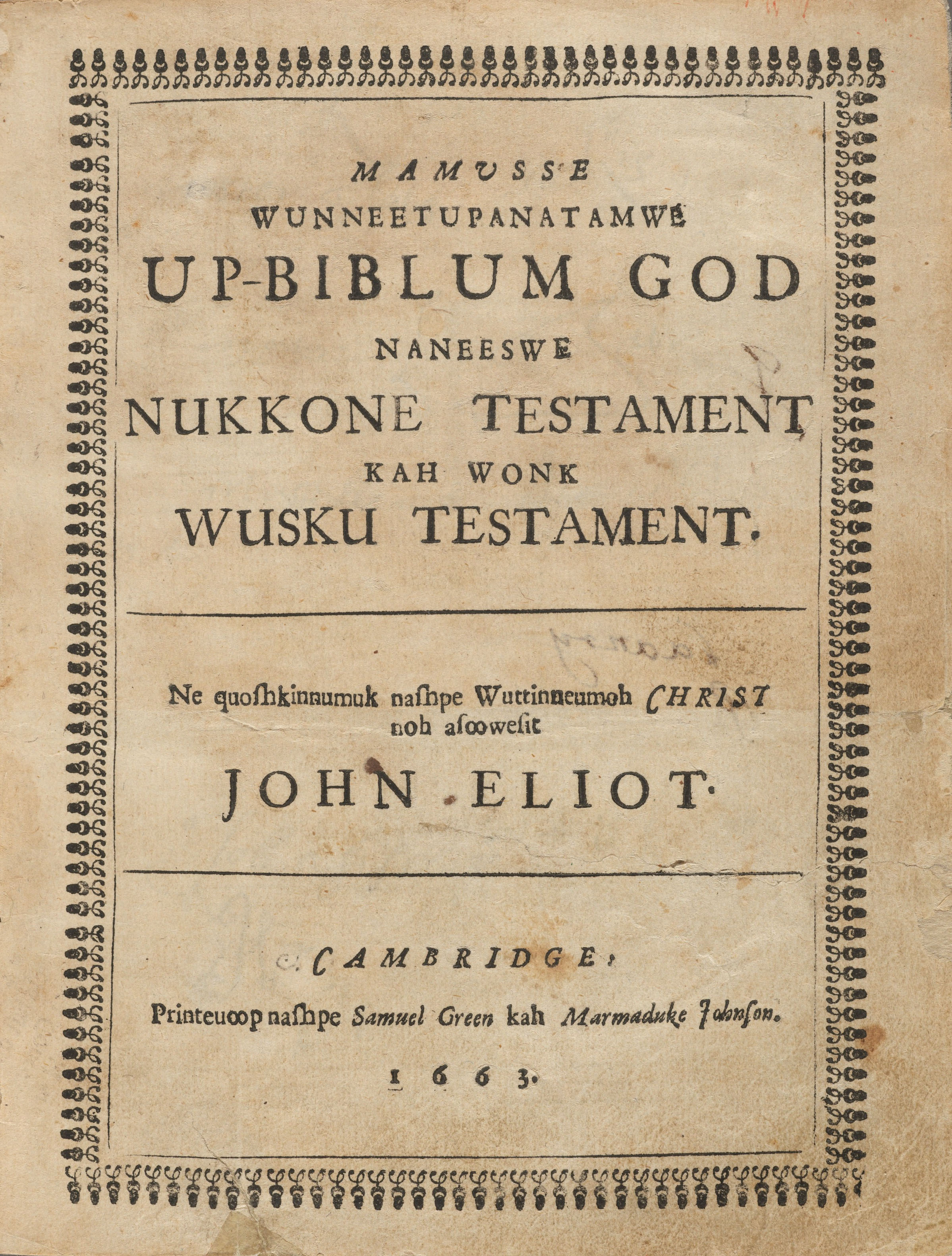
The Puritan colonists sought to convert the indigenous population to Christianity. The English missionary John Eliot led an effort to translate the Bible into Algonquian, publishing the Old Testament in 1661 and the full Eliot Indian Bible in 1663.

Conflict increased between the Wampanoags and settlers due to the continual intrusion of settlers' unfenced livestock—swine and cattle imported from Europe—onto Wampanoag farms, food stores, and hunting grounds, with few colonists taking more than half-hearted steps to prevent this in spite of regular complaints by the Wampanoags. The colonizers also sought punishments for livestock killed by Wampanoag hunters and their traps. Another grievance held by many Wampanoags was the attempts by colonial missionaries to convert them to Christianity; among those who expressed such grievances was Metacom himself, who declared that he and other Wampanoag leaders possessed a great fear that any of their people "should be called or forced to be Christian Indians". Metacom began negotiating with the other Algonquian tribes against the Plymouth Colony in the winter of the years 1674–1675.

However, conflict abounded, even amidst tribes and families. Two months before the outbreak of the war, Mammanuah, the son of Awashonks, leader of the Sakonnet, had signed a deed granting English colonizers the right to all the land from Pocasset Neck south to the sea, without first seeking his mother's approval.

At the start of the planting season, conflict erupted when new settlers began to plant on lands tenured under the rule of Awashonks. Mammanuah was confronted by his mother and other members of his tribe. He was stripped of his title by his relatives but allowed to leave with his life. Mammanuah sought restitution at Plymouth, where his title was reinstated by colonial authorities who had noticeably ulterior motives for wanting the land deed to remain valid.

Internal conflict between native tribes and their families was motivated by competing concepts of colonial patrilineal rule and the existing matrilineal rule of many native women. As conflict mounted, native tribes turned against other tribes as well as their own people, with families taking sides across different lines.

=== Population ===
The population of New England colonists totaled about 65,000 people. They lived in 110 towns, of which 64 were in the Massachusetts Bay colony, which then included the southwestern portion of Maine and southern New Hampshire until 1679. About half these towns participated in the war. The towns had about 13,000 men of military age. Universal training was prevalent in all colonial New England towns for these men, barring clergy and those with disabilities. Many towns had built strong garrison houses for defense, and others had stockades enclosing most of the houses. All of these were strengthened as the war progressed. Some poorly populated towns were abandoned if they did not have enough men to defend them.

Each town had local militias based on all eligible men who had to supply their own arms. Only those who were too old, too young, disabled, or clergy were excused from military service. The militias were usually only minimally trained and initially did relatively poorly against the warring Natives, until more effective training and tactics could be devised. Joint forces of militia volunteers and volunteer Indigenous allies were found to be the most effective. The Indigenous allies of the colonists numbered about 1,000 from the Mohegans and Praying Indians, with about 200 warriors.

By 1676, the regional Indigenous population had decreased to about 10,000 (exact numbers are unavailable) largely because of epidemics. These included about 4,000 Narragansetts of western Rhode Island and eastern Connecticut, 2,400 Nipmucs of central and western Massachusetts, and 2,400 combined in the Massachusett and Pawtucket tribes living around Massachusetts Bay and extending northwest to Maine. The Wampanoags and Pokanokets of Plymouth and eastern Rhode Island are thought to have numbered fewer than 1,000. About one in five were considered to be warriors. By then, the Natives had almost universally adopted steel knives, tomahawks, and flintlock muskets as their weapons. The various tribes had no common government. They had distinct cultures and often warred among themselves, although they all spoke related languages from the Algonquian family.

=== Trial ===
John Sassamon was a Native convert to Christianity, commonly referred to as a "praying Indian". He played a key role as a cultural mediator, negotiating with both colonists and Natives while belonging to neither party. He was an early graduate of Harvard College and served as a translator and adviser to Metacomet. He reported to the governor of Plymouth Colony that Metacomet planned to gather allies for Native attacks on widely dispersed colonial settlements.

Metacomet was brought before a public court, where court officials admitted that they had no proof but warned that they would confiscate Wampanoag land and guns if they had any further reports that he was conspiring to start a war. Not long after, Sassamon's body was found in the ice-covered Assawompset Pond, and Plymouth Colony officials arrested three Wampanoags on the testimony of a Native witness, including one of Metacomet's counselors. The jury, which consisted of twelve colonists and six Indigenous elders, convicted the men of Sassamon's murder, and they were executed by hanging on June 8, 1675 (O.S.) at Plymouth.

Most importantly, the pond where Sassamon’s body was found in was at the center of a heated land claim, under which Plymouth men were attempting to purchase vast swaths of land at Nemasket. His death became the necessary pretext for Plymouth Colony’s arrest of a counselor tied to suppressing the purchasing of land around Nemasket. Under captivity, the counselor and block to the signing of a land grant for the Plymouth Colony, Tobias, and the other arrested men were forced to sign the rights away of all of their land at Nemasket. With Sassamon dead and the land deed signed, the land surrounding the pond became formally acknowledged as part of the town of Middlebury and was open for English settlement. With the killing of Sassamon, the proverbial first shots of the war were fired.

== Southern theater, 1675 ==
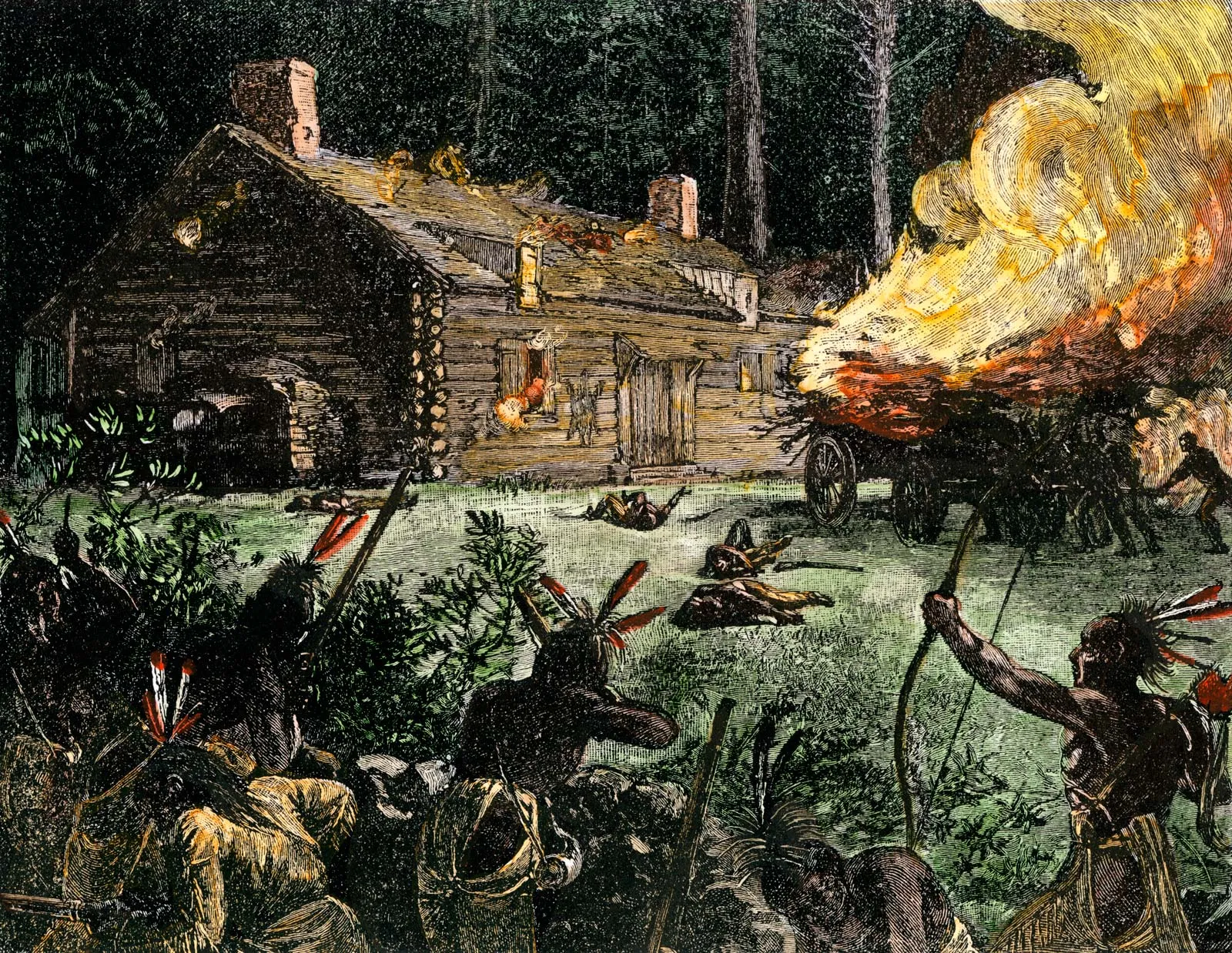
A Native American attack on an English settlement, as imagined in a 19th-century colored wood-cut print.

=== Raid on Swansea ===
According to Benjamin Church, a band of Pokanokets attacked several isolated homesteads in the small Plymouth colony settlement of Swansea on June 20, 1675, likely against Phillip's approval. They burned several homes. On June 23, a local boy saw a Pokanoket in front of his home and was instructed to fire, killing him. Pokanokets became enraged and on June 24 launched a full-scale attack on Swansea, killing three. On June 27, 1675, a full Lunar Eclipse occurred in the New England area, and various tribes in New England thought it a good omen for attacking the colonists. Officials from the Plymouth and Massachusetts Bay colonies responded quickly to the attacks on Swansea; on June 28, they sent a punitive military expedition that destroyed the Wampanoag town at Mount Hope in Bristol, Rhode Island.

The war quickly spread and soon involved the Podunk and Nipmuc tribes. During the summer of 1675, the Natives attacked at Middleborough and Dartmouth, Massachusetts (July 8), Mendon, Massachusetts (July 14), Brookfield, Massachusetts (August 2), and Lancaster, Massachusetts (August 9). In early September, they attacked Deerfield, Hadley, and Northfield, Massachusetts.

=== Siege of Brookfield ===
Wheeler's Surprise and the ensuing Siege of Brookfield were fought in August 1675, between Nipmucs under Muttawmp and the colonists of Massachusetts Bay under the command of Thomas Wheeler and Captain Edward Hutchinson. The battle consisted of an initial ambush on August 2, 1675 by the Nipmucs against Wheeler's unsuspecting party. Eight men from Wheeler's company died during the ambush: Zechariah Phillips of Boston, Timothy Farlow of Billerica, Edward Coleborn of Chelmsford, Samuel Smedly of Concord, Shadrach Hapgood of Sudbury, Sergeant Eyres, Sergeant Prichard, and Corporal Coy of Brookfield. Following the ambush was an attack on Brookfield, Massachusetts, and the consequent besieging of the remains of the colonial force. The Nipmucs harried the settlers for two days, until they were driven off by a newly arrived force of colonial soldiers under the command of Major Simon Willard. The siege took place at Ayers' Garrison in West Brookfield, but the location of the initial ambush was a subject of extensive controversy among historians in the late nineteenth century.

The New England Confederation consisted of the Massachusetts Bay Colony, Plymouth Colony, New Haven Colony, and Connecticut Colony; they declared war on the Natives on September 9, 1675. The Colony of Rhode Island and Providence Plantations tried to remain neutral, but much of the war was fought on Rhode Island soil; Providence and Warwick suffered extensive damage from the Natives.

The next colonial expedition was to recover crops from abandoned fields along the Connecticut River for the coming winter and included almost 100 farmers and militia, plus teamsters to drive the wagons.

=== Battle of Bloody Brook ===
The Battle of Bloody Brook was fought on September 12, 1675, between militia from the Massachusetts Bay Colony and a band of Natives led by Nipmuc sachem Muttawmp. The Natives ambushed colonists escorting a train of wagons carrying the harvest from Deerfield to Hadley. They killed at least 40 militia men and 17 teamsters out of a company that included 79 militia.

=== Attack on Springfield ===
The Natives next attacked Springfield, Massachusetts on October 5, 1675, the Connecticut River's largest settlement at the time. They burned to the ground nearly all of Springfield's buildings, including the town's grist mill. Most of the residents who escaped unharmed took cover at the house of Miles Morgan, a resident who had constructed one of the settlement's few fortified blockhouses. An Indigenous servant who worked for Morgan managed to escape and alerted the Massachusetts Bay troops under the command of Major Samuel Appleton, who broke through to Springfield and drove off the attackers.

=== Great Swamp Massacre ===
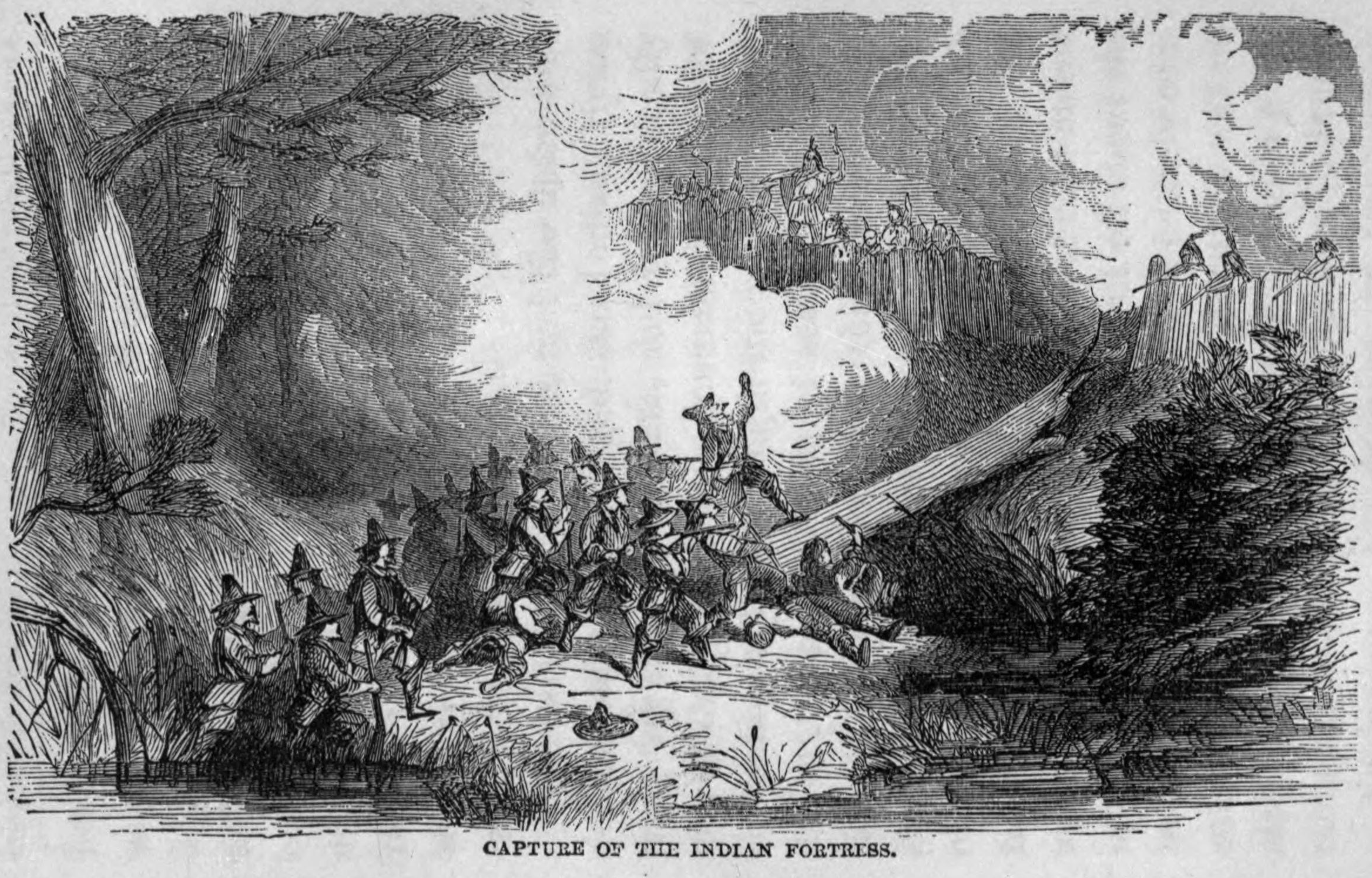
The December 1675 colonial assault on the Narragansetts' fort in the Great Swamp Fight, as imagined in a 19th century engraving.

The Narragansetts endeavored to remain neutral in the war, driven partly by their relationship with Roger Williams. They were not directly involved in the war, but they had sheltered many of the Wampanoag fighters, women, and children, and there were questions about some of their warriors participating in several Native attacks. In October 1675, Narraganset sachem Canonchet signed a "Treaty of Neutrality" with the Massachusetts Bay Colony, but the colonists' distrust remained.

On November 2, Plymouth Colony Governor Josiah Winslow led a combined force of Plymouth, Massachusetts, and Connecticut militia against the Narragansett tribe. The colonists distrusted the tribe and their various alliances. As the colonial forces went through Rhode Island, they found and burned several Native towns which had been abandoned by the Narragansetts, who had retreated to a massive fort in a frozen swamp. The cold weather in December froze the swamp so that it was relatively easy to traverse. The colonial force found the Narragansett fort on December 19, 1675 near South Kingstown, Rhode Island. About 1,000 troops attacked, including about 150 Pequot and Mohegan allies. It is believed that the militia killed about 600 Narragansetts. They burned the fort (occupying over 5 acres (20,000 m^{2}) of land) and destroyed most of the tribe's winter stores.

Most of the Narragansett warriors escaped into the frozen swamp. The colonists lost about 70 men killed and nearly 150 more wounded, including many of their officers. The surviving militia returned to their homes, lacking supplies for an extended campaign. The nearby towns in Rhode Island provided care for the wounded until they could return to their homes.

In the spring of 1676, the Narragansetts counterattacked under Canonchet, assembling an army of 2,000 men. They burned Providence, including Roger William's house. The Narragansetts were finally defeated when Canonchet was captured and executed in April 1676; then female sachem Queen Quaiapen and approximately 138 supporters were killed in an ambush.

=== Mohawk intervention ===
In December 1675, Metacomet established a winter camp in Schaghticoke, New York. His reason for moving into New York has been attributed to a desire to enlist Mohawk aid in the conflict. New York was a non-belligerent, but Governor Edmund Andros was nonetheless concerned at the arrival of the Wampanoag sachem. Either with Andros' sanction, or of their own accord, the Mohawk—traditional rivals of the Algonquian people—launched a surprise assault against a 500-warrior band under Metacomet's command the following February. The coup de main resulted in the death of between 70 and 460 of the Wampanoags. Metacomet withdrew to New England, pursued by Mohawk forces who attacked Algonquian settlements and ambushed their supply parties.

Over the next several months, fear of Mohawk attack led some Wampanoags to surrender to the colonists, and one historian described the decision of the Mohawks to engage Metacomet's forces as "the blow that lost the war for Philip".

=== Native campaign ===
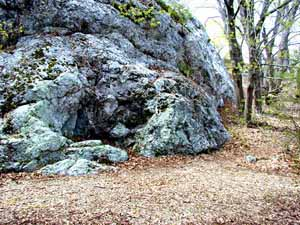
"King Philip's Seat", a meeting place on Mount Hope in Bristol, Rhode Island.

Natives attacked and destroyed more settlements throughout the winter of 1675–1676 in their effort to annihilate the colonists. They attacked homes in Andover, Bridgewater, Chelmsford, Groton, Lancaster, Marlborough, Medfield, Medford, Portland, Providence, Rehoboth, Scituate, Seekonk, Simsbury, Sudbury, Suffield, Taunton, Warwick, Weymouth, and Wrentham, including Norfolk and Plainville.

In the first months of the war, Wampanoags employed the strategy of tactical retreat. As English colonists marched through Native settlements, many Natives sought safety by hiding in the swamps surrounding Nemasket. Led by Weetamoo, mothers and their children were marched silently away from encampments and sought protection in the thickest part of the swamps. In their wake, settled along the outskirts of emptied Native villages, Wampanoag warriors ambushed English troops as they marched through Rhode Island. Utilizing kinship networks, the Wampanoags and their allied tribes spread word of English locations, encampments, and attacks in order to warn other resisting Native Americans. Weetamoo later formed an alliance at Narragansett with the Nipmuc in order to create a larger Native cause.

The account written and published by Mary Rowlandson after the war gives a colonial captive's perspective on the conflict. Rowlandson was captured by Nipmucs and led miles through surrounding wilderness, keeping her captured through her lack of knowledge of the land. Rowlandson was 'gifted' to Weetamoo and her husband Quinnapin following their wedding, as a gift for their role in securing Native alliances and allies in the war. Rowlandson’s captivity narrative and the following explosion of the Puritan captivity narrative genre, is largely where historical information regarding the inner workings of Native society comes from, as primary sources from white colonial entrepreneurs in the New World. In fact, Rowlandson’s captivity narrative is largely the basis of many understandings about Weetamoo’s role in the war.

== Southern theater, 1676 ==
=== Lancaster raid ===
The Lancaster raid in February 1676 was a Native attack on the community of Lancaster, Massachusetts. Philip led a force of 1,500 Wampanoag, Nipmuc, and Narragansett men in a dawn attack on the isolated village, which then included the neighboring communities of Bolton and Clinton. They attacked five fortified houses. They set fire to the house of Rev. Joseph Rowlandson and slaughtered most of its occupants—more than 30 people. Rowlandson's wife Mary was taken prisoner, and afterward wrote a best-selling narrative of her experiences. Many of the community's other houses were destroyed before the Natives retreated northward.

=== Plymouth Plantation Campaign ===
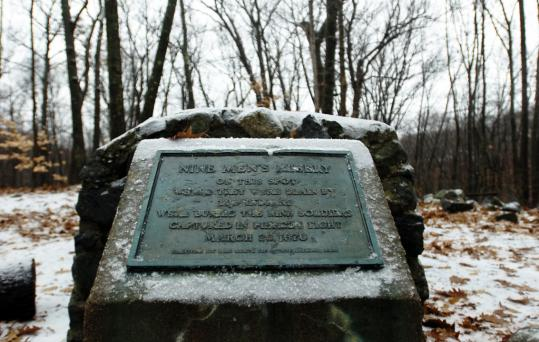
Site of "Nine Men's Misery" in Cumberland, Rhode Island, where Captain Pierce's troops were tortured to death

The spring of 1676 marked the high point for the combined tribes when they attacked Plymouth Plantation on March 12. The town withstood the assault, but the Natives had demonstrated their ability to penetrate deep into colonial territory. They attacked three more settlements; Longmeadow (near Springfield), Marlborough, and Simsbury were attacked two weeks later. They killed Captain Pierce and a company of Massachusetts soldiers between Pawtucket and the Blackstone's settlement. They tortured several colonial men to death and buried them at Nine Men's Misery in Cumberland as part of their ritual torture of enemies. They also burned the settlement of Providence to the ground on March 29. At the same time, a small band of Natives infiltrated and burned part of Springfield while the militia was away.

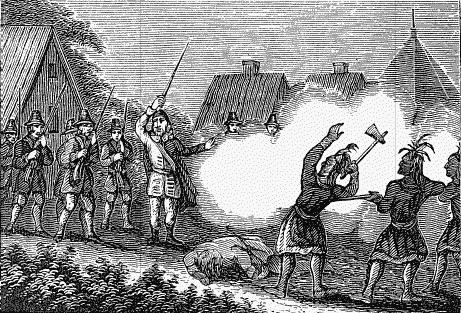
Colonists defending their settlement (non-contemporary depiction)

The settlements within the Colony of Rhode Island became a literal island colony for a time as the settlements at Providence and Warwick were sacked and burned, and the residents were driven to Newport and Portsmouth on Rhode Island. The Connecticut River towns had thousands of acres of cultivated crop land known as the bread basket of New England, but they had to limit their plantings and work in large armed groups for self-protection. Towns such as Springfield, Hatfield, Hadley, and Northampton, Massachusetts fortified themselves, reinforced their militias, and held their ground, though attacked several times. The small towns of Northfield, Deerfield, and several others were abandoned as the surviving settlers retreated to the larger towns. The towns of the Connecticut colony were largely unharmed in the war, although more than 100 Connecticut militia died in their support of the other colonies.

=== Sudbury Fight ===
The Sudbury Fight took place in Sudbury, Massachusetts on April 21, 1676. The town was surprised by Native raiders at dawn, who besieged a local garrison house and burned several unoccupied homes and farms. Reinforcements that arrived from nearby towns were drawn into ambushes by the Natives; Captain Samuel Wadsworth lost his life and half of a 70-man militia in such an ambush. It was the last major victory by the Indigenous coalition of the war.

=== Peskeompscut-Wissantinnewag Massacre ===
On May 19, 1676, Captain William Turner of the Massachusetts Militia and about 150 militia volunteers (mostly minimally trained farmers) attacked a Native fishing camp at Peskeopscut on the Connecticut River now called Turners Falls, Massachusetts. The colonists killed approximately 200 Natives. The warriors were camped upstream at Smeads Island. Turner and nearly 40 of the militia were killed during the return from the falls.

The colonists defeated an attack at Hadley on June 12, 1676 with the help of their Mohegan allies, scattering most of the survivors into New Hampshire and farther north. Later that month, a force of 250 Natives was routed near Marlborough, Massachusetts. Combined forces of colonial volunteers and their Indigenous allies continued to attack, kill, capture, or disperse bands of Narragansetts, Nipmucs, and Wampanoags as they tried to plant crops or return to their traditional locations. The colonists granted amnesty to those who surrendered or who were captured and showed that they had not participated in the conflict. Captives who had participated in attacks on the many settlements were hanged, enslaved, or put to indentured servitude, depending upon the colony involved.

=== Second Battle of Nipsachuck ===
The Second Battle of Nipsachuck occurred on July 2, 1676 and included a rare use of a cavalry charge by the English colonists. In the summer of 1676, a band of over 100 Narragansetts led by female sachem Quaiapen returned to northern Rhode Island, apparently seeking to recover cached seed corn for planting. They were attacked by a force of 400, composed of 300 Connecticut colonial militia and about 100 Mohegan and Pequot warriors, and Quaiapen was killed along with the leaders as they sought refuge in Mattekonnit (Mattity) Swamp in North Smithfield, while the remainder of the survivors were sold into slavery.

=== Capture at Mount Hope ===
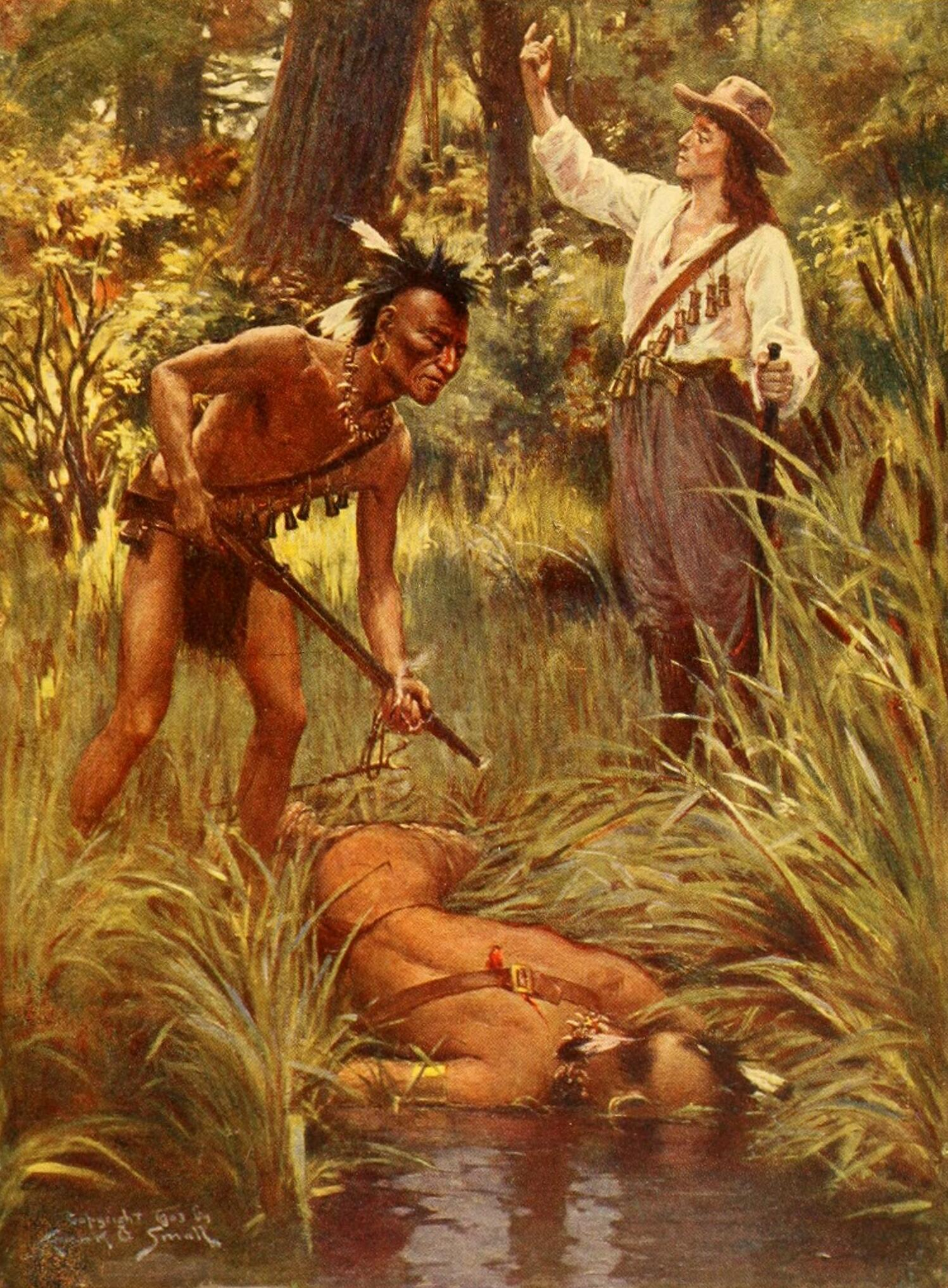
John Alderman and Benjamin Church next to Metacomet's corpse, as imagined in a 1903 painting

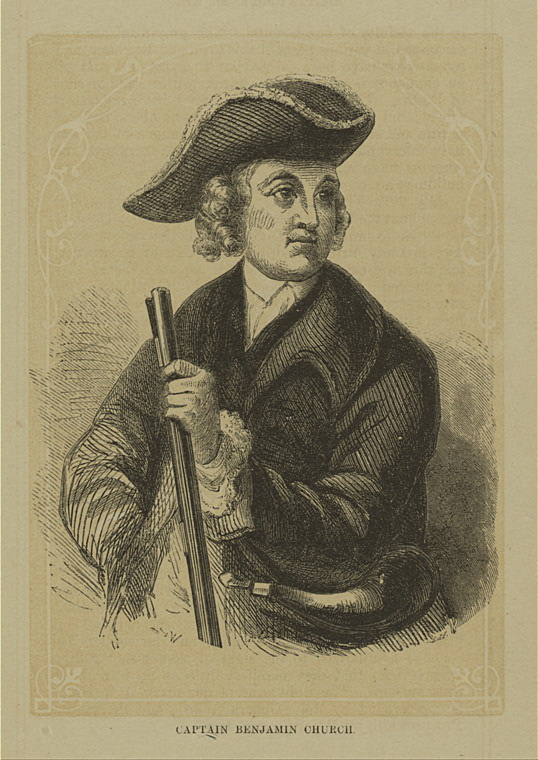
Benjamin Church: Father of the United States Army Rangers

Metacomet's allies began to desert him, and more than 400 had surrendered to the colonists by early July. Metacomet took refuge back at Assawompset Pond, the Wampanoag settlement near which John Sassamon had been found dead before the outset of the war, but the colonists formed raiding parties with Indigenous allies, and he retreated southwest towards Rhode Island. Metacomet was killed by one of these teams when Captain Benjamin Church and Captain Josiah Standish of the Plymouth Colony militia tracked him to Mount Hope in Bristol, Rhode Island. He was shot and killed by an Indian named John Alderman on August 12, 1676. Metacomet's corpse was beheaded then chopped into pieces. His head was displayed in Plymouth for a generation, which was commonly done in Britain to traitors; Wampanoag memory holds that the skull was later taken by tribal members and secretly buried.

Captain Church and his soldiers captured Pocasset war chief Anawan on August 28, 1676, at Anawan Rock in Rehoboth, Massachusetts. He was an old man at the time, though a chief captain of Metacomet. His capture marked the final event in King Philip's War, as he was also beheaded.

== Northern Theater (Maine and Acadia) ==
Before the outbreak of war, English settlers in Maine and New Hampshire lived peaceably with their Wabanaki neighbors. Colonists engaged in fishing, harvesting timber, and trade with the Natives. By 1657, English towns and trading posts stretched along the coast eastward to the Kennebec River. These communities were scattered and lacked fortifications. The defenseless posture of English settlements reflected the amicable relationship between Wabanakis and colonists up to that time.

Upon hearing news of the Wampanoag attack on Swansea, colonists in York marched up the Kennebec River in June 1675 and demanded that Wabanakis turn over their guns and ammunition as a sign of goodwill. The Wabanakis began raiding trading posts and attacking settlers. The Wabanakis decimated the colonial settlements east of the Saco River under the leadership of Androscoggin sagamore Mogg Hegon and Penobscot sagamore Madockawando. The Indians made three major attacks in 1675, 1676, and 1677, most of which led to a massive colonial response. Richard Waldron and Charles Frost led the colonial forces in the northern region. Waldron sent forces that attacked the Mi'kmaq in Acadia.

Mogg Hegon repeatedly attacked towns such as Black Point (Scarborough), Wells, and Damariscove, building a flotilla out of the approximately 40 sloops and a dozen 30-ton ships previously armed by militia. Maine's fishing industry was completely destroyed by the Wabanaki flotilla. Records from Salem record 20 ketches stolen and destroyed in one raid in Maine.

The Wabanakis sued for peace in 1677, and the fighting ended with the Treaty of Casco (1678). The treaty allowed settlers to return to Maine if each English family paid the Wabanakis a peck of corn each year.

By the end of the war, approximately 400 settlers died, Maine's fishing economy was devastated, and the Natives maintained power in eastern and northern Maine. There is not an accurate account of the number of Natives who died, but it is thought to be between 100 and 300.

== Dedham as a center of colonial operations ==
During the war, men from Dedham went off to fight and several died. They included Robert Hinsdale, his four sons, and Jonathan Plympton who died at the Battle of Bloody Brook. John Plympton was burned at the stake after being marched to Canada with Quentin Stockwell.

Zachariah Smith was passing through Dedham on April 12, 1671 when he stopped at the home of Caleb Church in the "sawmill settlement" on the banks of the Neponset River. The next morning, a group of praying Indians found him shot dead, and suspicion fell on a group on Nipmucs who were heading south to Providence. This was the "first actual outrage of King Phillip's War". One of the Nipmucs, a son of Matoonas, was found guilty and hanged on Boston Common, and his head was impaled on a pike at the end of the gallows. Dedham then readied its cannon in preparation for an attack that never came.

After the raid on Swansea, the colony ordered the militias of several towns to have 100 soldiers ready to march out on an hour's notice. Captain Daniel Henchmen took command of the men and left Boston on June 26, 1675. They arrived in Dedham by nightfall and the troops became worried by an eclipse of the moon, which they took as a bad omen. Some claimed to see Indian bows in the moon. Dedham was largely spared from the fighting and was not attacked, but they did build a fortification and offered tax cuts to men who joined the cavalry.

Plymouth Colony governor Josiah Winslow and Captain Benjamin Church rode from Boston to Dedham to take charge of the 465 soldiers and 275 cavalry assembling there and together departed on December 8, 1675 for the Great Swamp Fight. (Note: Hanson has the date as December 9.) When the commanders arrived, they also found "a vast assortment of teamsters, volunteers, servants, service personnel, and hangers-on".

Phillip's chief advisor Pumham was captured in Dedham on July 25, 1676. Several Christian Indians had seen his band in the woods, nearly starved to death. Captain Samuel Hunting (Note: The son of John Hunting.) led 36 men from Dedham and Medfield and joined 90 Indians on a hunt to find them. A total of 15 of the enemy were killed and 35 were captured. Pumham was so wounded that he could barely stand, but he grabbed hold of an English soldier and would have killed him had not one of the settler's compatriots come to his rescue.

== Aftermath ==
=== Southern New England ===
The war in southern New England largely ended with Metacom's death. More than 1,000 colonists and 3,000 Natives had died. More than half of all New England towns were attacked by Native warriors, and many were completely destroyed. Hundreds of Native captives were enslaved. Some women and children were sold as indentured servants or slaves to the households of English settlers, but the majority, including Metacom's son and most adult men, were transported to slave markets in Bermuda, Barbados, Jamaica, Spain, Portugal, Madeira, and the Azores. Other survivors joined western and northern tribes and refugee communities as captives or tribal members. Some of the Native refugees returned to southern New England. The Narragansetts, Wampanoags, Podunks, Nipmucks suffered substantial losses, several smaller bands were virtually eliminated as organized bands.

Around a thousand Christian Indians survived the war, and after being released from captivity on Deer Island resettled first Natick and then three other "Praying Towns". These groups ironically increased their autonomy and provincial laws barred the sale of their lands without permission of the General Court. Natick remained by far the largest, with about thirty families in 1699, compared with five to ten in Chabanakongkomun, Hassanamisco, and Punkapoag. But between 1720 and 1750, Natick rapidly became a white town, as the Indians invited the Anglo minister Oliver Peabody to take the pulpit, and he was followed by a growing tide of Anglo settlers who treated the Indians with contempt and abuse. The result was a native exodus, as their numbers in Natick dropped from 160 in 1754 to only 37 in 1764. But they did not go far: most if not all remained in the area between Worcester and Boston, and for generations remained in close contact with relatives in the region.

The Colony of Rhode Island was devastated by the war, as its principal city Providence was destroyed. Nevertheless, the Rhode Island legislature issued a formal rebuke to Connecticut Governor John Winthrop on October 26, scarcely six months after the burning of the city—although Winthrop had died. The "official letter" places blame squarely on the United Colonies of New England for causing the war by provoking the Narragansetts.

Sir Edmund Andros had been appointed governor of New York in 1674 by the Duke of York, who claimed that his authority extended as far north as Maine's northern boundary. He negotiated a treaty with some of the northern Native bands in Maine on April 12, 1678. Metacom's Pennacook allies had made a separate peace with the colonists as the result of early battles that are sometimes identified as part of King Philip's War. The tribe nevertheless lost members and eventually its identity as the result of the war.

==== Plymouth Colony ====
Plymouth Colony lost close to eight percent of its adult male population and a smaller percentage of women and children to Native attacks and other causes associated with the war. Indigenous losses were much greater, with about 2,000 men killed in the war, more than 3,000 dying of sickness or starvation. Various historians have estimated that several hundred to over one-thousand Native captives were sold into slavery.

But many Natives and their communities survived the war, especially on Cape Cod where the war had few direct effects. After 1695, Plymouth’s incorporation into Massachusetts encouraged expansion and creation of English settlements, putting new pressures on Native resources and driving the consolidation of their villages. Clusters of Indian communities developed: Teticut and Assawompsett, near Pembroke and Middleborough in Plymouth County, around Dartmouth along Buzzard’s Bay in Bristol County, along the upper and middle Cape, with around 500 Indians in four villages in 1693, and at Herring Pond and Mashpee between Plymouth and the lower Cape, with around 500 people in 1698. During the first half of the eighteenth century, nearly all of the remaining Indians on the Cape would move to Mashpee, making it the largest community on the mainland, and the other three clusters would shrink to just a few families.

=== Northern New England ===
Conflict continued for decades in Maine, New Hampshire, and northern Massachusetts. There were six wars over the next 74 years between New France and New England, along with their respective Indigenous allies, starting with King William's War in 1689. (See French and Indian Wars, Father Rale's War, and Father Le Loutre's War.) The conflict in northern New England was largely over the border between New England and Acadia, which New France defined as the Kennebec River in southern Maine. Many colonists from northeastern Maine and Massachusetts temporarily relocated to larger towns in Massachusetts and New Hampshire to avoid Wabanaki raids.

== Legacy ==
Washington Irving (1783–1859) published the essay "Philip of Pokanoket" in 1820. The war was the subject of John Augustus Stone's 1829 play Metamora; or, The Last of the Wampanoags.

== Historiography ==
Contemporary narratives
Year	Author	Publication	Place of Publication
1675	unknown	A Brief and True Narration of the Late Wars	London
1675	Benjamin Batten	reporting in The London Gazette	London
1675	Peter Folger	A Looking Glasse for the Times	maybe was published
1675	Massachusetts Council	To Our Brethren	Cambridge (Massachusetts Bay Colony)
1675	Nathaniel Saltonstall	The Present State of New-England	London
1675	Edward Wharton	New-England's Present Sufferings	London
1675	Josiah Winslow and Thomas Hinckley	Narrative Shewing the Beginning . . . Warr	unpublished
1675	Wait Winthrop	Some Meditations	maybe was published
1676	unknown	A Farther Brief and True Nation	London
1676	unknown	News from New-England	London
1676	unknown	A True Account	London
1676	John Easton	Relacion of the Indyane Warre	maybe was published
1676	William Harris	untitled letter	unpublished
1676	Increase Mather	A Brief History of the War	Boston and London
1676	Increase Mather	An Earnest Exhortation	Boston
1676	Edward Randolph	"Short Narrative of My Proceedings"	unpublished
1676	Nathaniel Saltonstall	A Continuation of the State of New-England	London
1676	Nathaniel Saltonstall	A New and Further Narrative	London
1676	Benjamin Tompson	New England's Crisis	Boston
1676	Benjamin Tompson	New England's Tears	London
1676	Philip Walker	"Captan Perse & his coragios Company"	unpublished
1676	Thomas Wheeler	A Thankfull Remembrance of Gods Mercy	Cambridge

== See also ==
- American Indian Wars
- Colonial American military history
- Eulogy on King Phillip by William Apess, 1836
- Irish Donation of 1676
- Kieft's War
- List of Indian massacres

== Works cited ==
- Hanson, Robert Brand (1976). Dedham, Massachusetts, 1635–1890. Dedham Historical Society.
- Lockridge, Kenneth (1985). A New England Town. New York: W.W. Norton & Company. ISBN 978-0-393-95459-3.

== Bibliography ==
=== Primary sources ===
- Easton, John (1675). A Relation of the Indian War, by Mr. Easton, of Rhode Island.
- Eliot, John (1980). Rhonda, James P.; Bowden, Henry W. (eds.). "Indian Dialogues": A Study in Cultural Interaction. Greenwood Press.
- Hough, Franklin B. (1858). A Narrative of the causes which led to Philip's Indian War of 1675 and 1676. – John Easton's account first published
- Lincoln, Charles H. (1913). Narratives of the Indian Wars 1675–1699. New York: Charles Scribner's.
- Mather, Increase (1676). A Brief History of the Warr with the Natives in New-England. Boston and London.
- Mather, Increase (2003) [1677]. Relation of the Troubles Which Have Happened in New England by Reason of the Natives There, from the Year 1614 to the Year 1675. Kessinger Publishing.
- Mather, Increase (1862). The History of King Philip's War by the Rev. Increase Mather, D.D.; also, a history of the same war, by the Rev. Cotton Mather, D.D.; to which are added an introduction and notes, by Samuel G. Drake. Boston: Samuel G. Drake.
- Mather, Increase (1900) [1675–1676]. "Diary", March 1675–December 1676: Together with extracts from another diary by him, 1674–1687 /With introductions and notes, by Samuel A. Green. Cambridge, Massachusetts: J. Wilson.
- Randolph, Edward (1675). Description of King Philip's War. Archived from the original on November 27, 2020.
- Rowlandson, Mary (1997). The Sovereignty and Goodness of God: with Related Documents. Bedford: St. Martin's Press.
- Rowlandson, Mary (1682). The Narrative of the Captivity and the Restoration of Mrs. Mary Rowlandson. Archived from the original on October 11, 2007.

=== Secondary sources ===
- Miantonomoh. Vol. 18. Encyclopædia Britannica. 1911.
- Brooks, Lisa (2019). Our Beloved Kin: A New History of King Philip's War. Yale University Press.
- Cave, Alfred A. (1996). The Pequot War. Amherst: University of Massachusetts Press.
- Evelyn, John (1850). William Bray (ed.). Diary and correspondence of John Evelyn. London: Henry Colburn.
- Cogley, Richard A. (1999). John Eliot's Mission to the Natives before King Philip's War. Cambridge, Massachusetts: Harvard University Press.
- Drake, James David (1999). King Philip's War: Civil War in New England, 1675–1676. University of Massachusetts Press. ISBN 1558492240.
- Hall, David (1990). Worlds of Wonder, Days of Judgment: Popular Religious Belief in Early New England. Cambridge, Massachusetts: Harvard University Press.
- Kawashima, Yasuhide (2001). Igniting King Philip's War: The John Sassamon Murder Trial. Lawrence: University Press of Kansas.
- Leach, Douglas Edward (1954). Flintlock and Tomahawk: New England in King Philip's War. Parnassus Imprints, East Orleans, Massachusetts. ISBN 0-940160-55-2.
- Lepore, Jill (1999). The Name of War: King Philip's War and the Origins of American Identity. New York: Vintage Books. ISBN 978-0679446866.
- Mandell, Daniel R. (2010). King Philip's War: Colonial Expansion, Native Resistance, and the End of Indian Sovereignty. Johns Hopkins University Press.
- Martino-Trutor, Gina M. (2015). "As Potent a Prince as any Round About Her: Rethinking Weetamoo of the Pocassett and Native Female Leadership in Early America". Journal of Women's History. 27 (3): 37–60. doi:10.1353/jowh.2015.0032. S2CID 142629136.
- Norton, Mary Beth (2003). In the Devil's Snare: The Salem Witchcraft Crisis of. New York: Vintage Books.
- Peterson, Mark A. (2019). The City-State of Boston: The Rise and Fall of an Atlantic Power, 1630–1865. Princeton, New Jersey: Princeton University Press. Project MUSE book 64409.
- Philbrick, Nathaniel (2006). Mayflower: A Story of Courage, Community, and War. Penguin. ISBN 0-670-03760-5.
- Pulsipher, Jenny Hale (2005). Subjects unto the Same King: Natives, English, and the Contest for Authority in Colonial New England. Philadelphia: University of Pennsylvania Press.
- Schultz, Eric B.; Tougias, Michael J. (2000). King Philip's War: The History and Legacy of America's Forgotten Conflict. New York: W.W. Norton and Co. ISBN 978-0-88150-483-5.
- Slotkin, Richard; Folsom, James K. (1978). So Dreadful a Judgement: Puritan Responses to King Philip's War. Middletown, CT: Weysleyan University Press. ISBN 0-8195-5027-2.
- Vaughan, Alden T. (1979). New England Frontier: Puritans and Natives, 1620–1675.
- Warren, Jason W. (2014). Connecticut Unscathed: Victory in the Great Narragansett War, 1675–1676. University of Oklahoma Press. ISBN 978-0806144757.
- Webb, Stephen Saunders (1995). 1676: The End of American Independence. Syracuse, NY: Syracuse University Press.
- Zelner, Kyle F. (2009). A Rabble in Arms: Massachusetts Towns and Militiamen during King Philip's War. New York: New York University Press. ISBN 978-0814797181.
