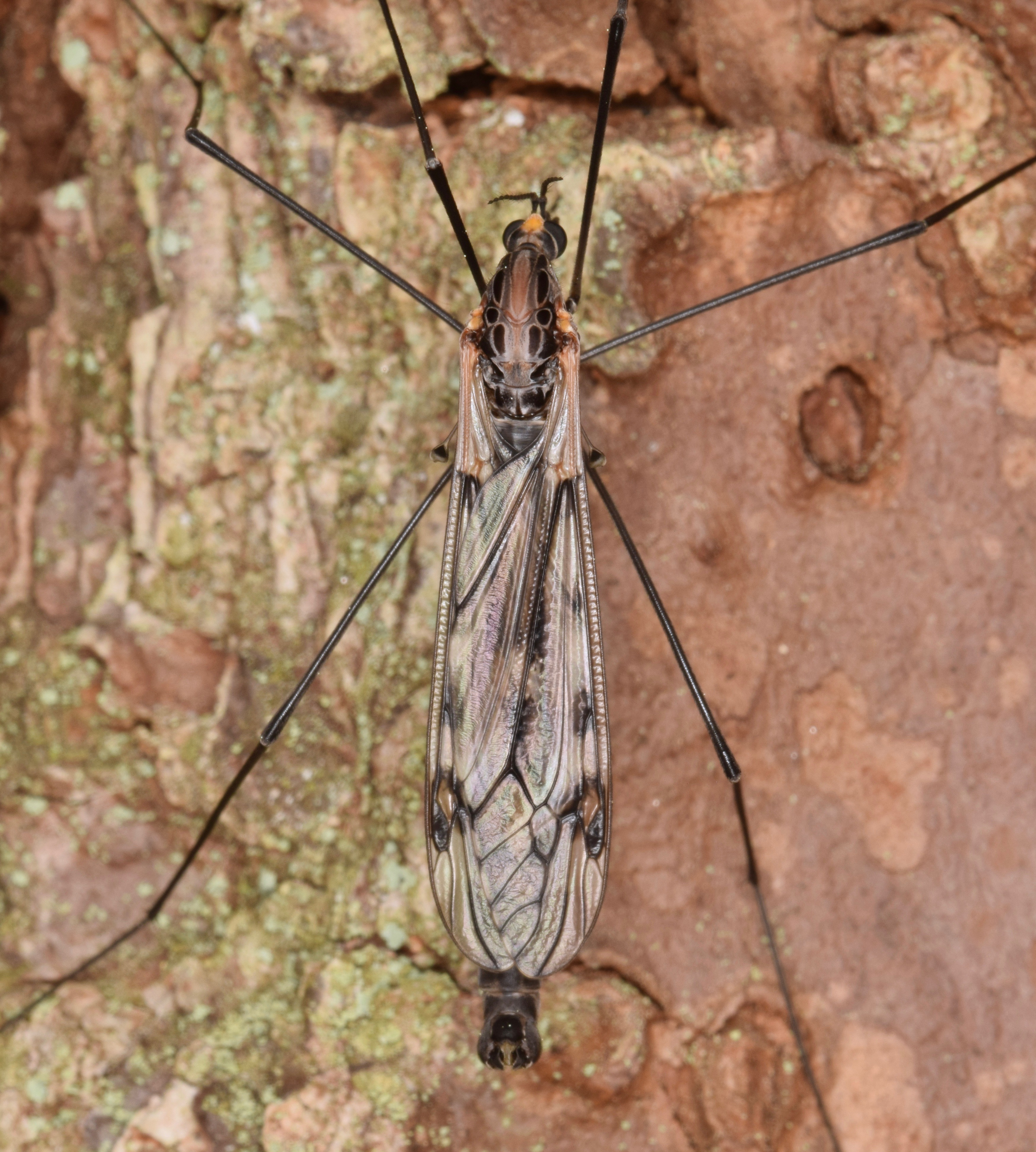

Scientific classification
- Kingdom: Animalia
- Phylum: Arthropoda
- Clade: Pancrustacea
- Class: Insecta
- Order: Diptera
- Family: Tipulidae
- Genus: Tipula
- Subgenus: Nippotipula
- Species: T. metacomet

Binomial name
- Tipula metacomet Alexander, 1965

= Tipula metacomet =

Species of fly

Tipula metacomet is a species of large crane fly in the family Tipulidae named for the Wampanoag chief Metacomet.
