= Mount Hope (Rhode Island) =

Small hill in Bristol, Rhode Island, US

- Montaup
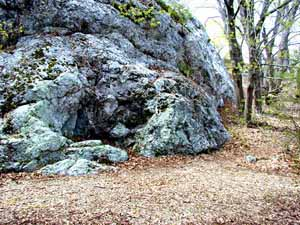
- "King Philip's Seat", a meeting place on Mount Hope

Highest point
- Elevation: 209 ft (64 m)
- Coordinates: 41°40′26″N 71°14′24″W

Geography
- Location within Rhode Island
- Location: Bristol, Rhode Island, United States

Mount Hope (originally Montaup in Pokanoket language) is a small hill in Bristol, Rhode Island overlooking the part of Narragansett Bay known as Mount Hope Bay. It is the highest point in Bristol County, RI. The 7000 acres that now make up the Town of Bristol in Rhode Island were called the Mt. Hope Lands. The elevation of Mt. Hope summit is 209 feet, and drops sharply to the bay on its eastern side. Mount Hope was the site of a Wampanoag (Pokanoket) village. It is remembered for its role in King Philip's War.

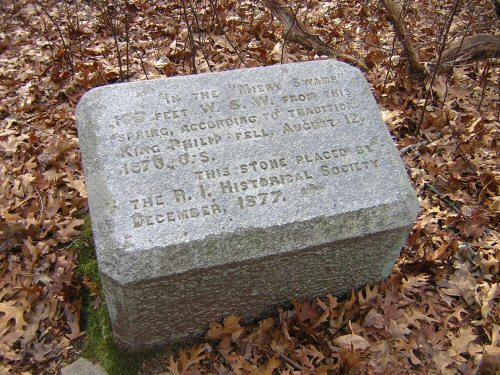
The site of King Philip's death in Misery Swamp on Mount Hope

Prior to 2024, Brown University owned 376 acres (152 ha) of woodland on Mt. Hope off Tower Street in Bristol. In 2024, Brown University announced they were giving 255 acres (103 ha) to a preservation trust established by members of the Pokanoket Tribe. The university's grounds on Mount Hope included King Philip's Seat (or "chair"), a large quartz rock formation where Wampanoag sachem King Philip held meetings. The site of King Philip's death in Misery Swamp is nearby. Mount Hope Farm is also nearby.

The first battle of King Philip's War took place near here in 1675. By the second half of the seventeenth century, encroachment by European settlers had reduced the land of the Pokanoket to the Mt. Hope Lands. After his father Massasoit died, and then his older brother died, Metacomet, now King Philip, began making alliances with other tribes and war soon began. King Philip made nearby Mount Hope his base of operations. "King Philip's Chair," a rocky ledge on the mountain, was a lookout site for enemy ships on Mount Hope Bay. Philip was eventually defeated and killed. The site where Captain Benjamin Church's men killed King Philip in 1676 is located in nearby Misery Swamp. Metacom Avenue, State Route 136, one of the two principal north–south roads in Bristol, was named after him, derived from his Wampanoag name Metacomet.

After the conclusion of King Philip's War, the town surrounding Mt. Hope was settled in 1680 as part of the Plymouth Colony. In 1680 all 7,000 acres (2,800 ha) of the Mt. Hope Lands were bought by four Boston investors. It became the Town of Bristol, a part of Plymouth Colony. One of the investors, Nathaniel Byfield, claimed the 550 acres (220 ha) acres of Mt. Hope for his own farm. He sold the farm in 1702 to his son-in-law and, in 1744, Byfield's granddaughter, Elizabeth Royall, inherited it. Elizabeth and her husband Isaac built a 2 1/2-story gambrel roof home (this house is still part of the farm today). Bristol remained a part of Massachusetts until the Crown transferred Bristol and other lands to the Rhode Island Colony in 1747. Because they were Loyalists, Elizabeth and Isaac fled Bristol during the Revolutionary War and their home and farm were confiscated by the State of Rhode Island.

After the Revolution, William Bradford, great-great-grandson of Puritan Governor William Bradford, bought Mt. Hope Farm as it was now called. Bradford had been Lt. Governor of Rhode Island, a US Senator from Rhode Island and had worked for many years as a public servant. The 1745 house on Mt. Hope Farm is still called The Governor Bradford House. The 127 acres (51 ha) parcel known as Mount Hope Farm is run by the Mount Hope Trust, a nonprofit, which offers 12 inn rooms to the public. The buildings and grounds are rented for events and a number of community and children's programs are offered.

It can be seen as part of the Haffenreffer Museum of Anthropology grounds. Church eventually became an owner of Mount Hope.
