= Mount Hope Farm =

Coordinates: 41°40′43″N 71°14′13″W

- U.S. National Register of Historic Places
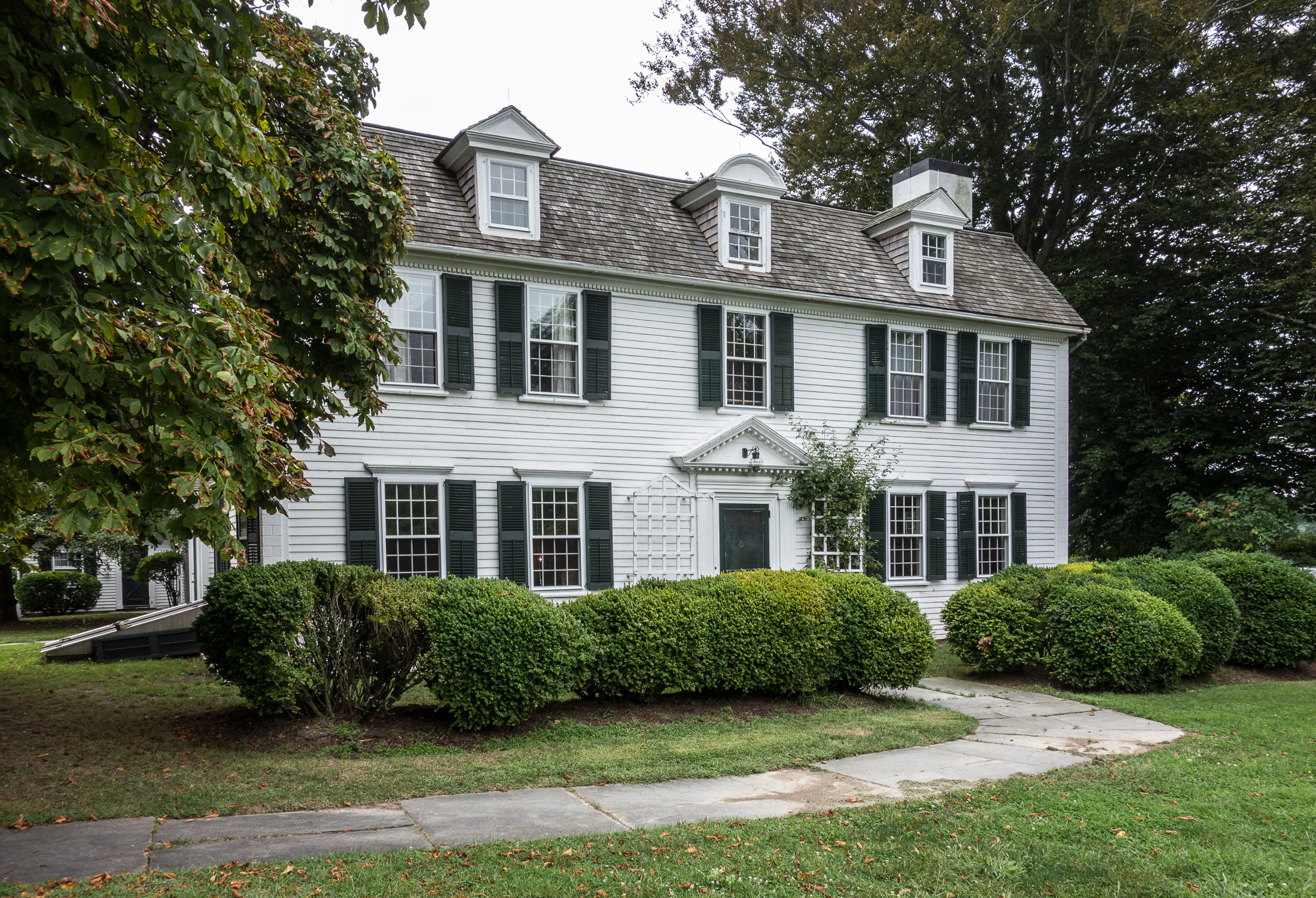
- Governor Bradford House in 2013

- Location within Rhode Island Location within the United States
- Location: Bristol, Rhode Island
- Area: 211 acres (85 ha)
- Built: 1745
- Architectural style: Colonial
- NRHP reference No.: 77000023
- Added to NRHP: May 2, 1977

Mount Hope Farm (also known as Gov. William Bradford House) is a historic estate on Metacom Avenue in Bristol, Rhode Island, United States.

== Description and history ==
The farm is located near the Mount Hope Bridge in Bristol, Rhode Island, and the grounds have been farmed since the 1680s. The present 211 acres (85 ha) are a remnant of a much larger property that included Mount Hope, the traditional seat of the Wampanoag people. The main house on the farm was built in several stages, the earliest portion dating to c. 1745. Its builder was Isaac Royall Jr., a noted merchant and owner of plantations in the West Indies. It was purchased in 1783 by William Bradford, who passed the property on to his children. Samuel W. Church purchased it from Bradford's heirs in 1837; he was a wealthy merchant from Taunton, Massachusetts and he made a major addition to the house in 1840. In 1917, the property was purchased by R. F. Haffenreffer, a wealthy industrialist and collector.

The farm was added to the National Register of Historic Places in 1977. It is now operated as a bed and breakfast inn and function facility. The farm is locally known for its farmer's market, held every Saturday year-round.

== Gallery ==
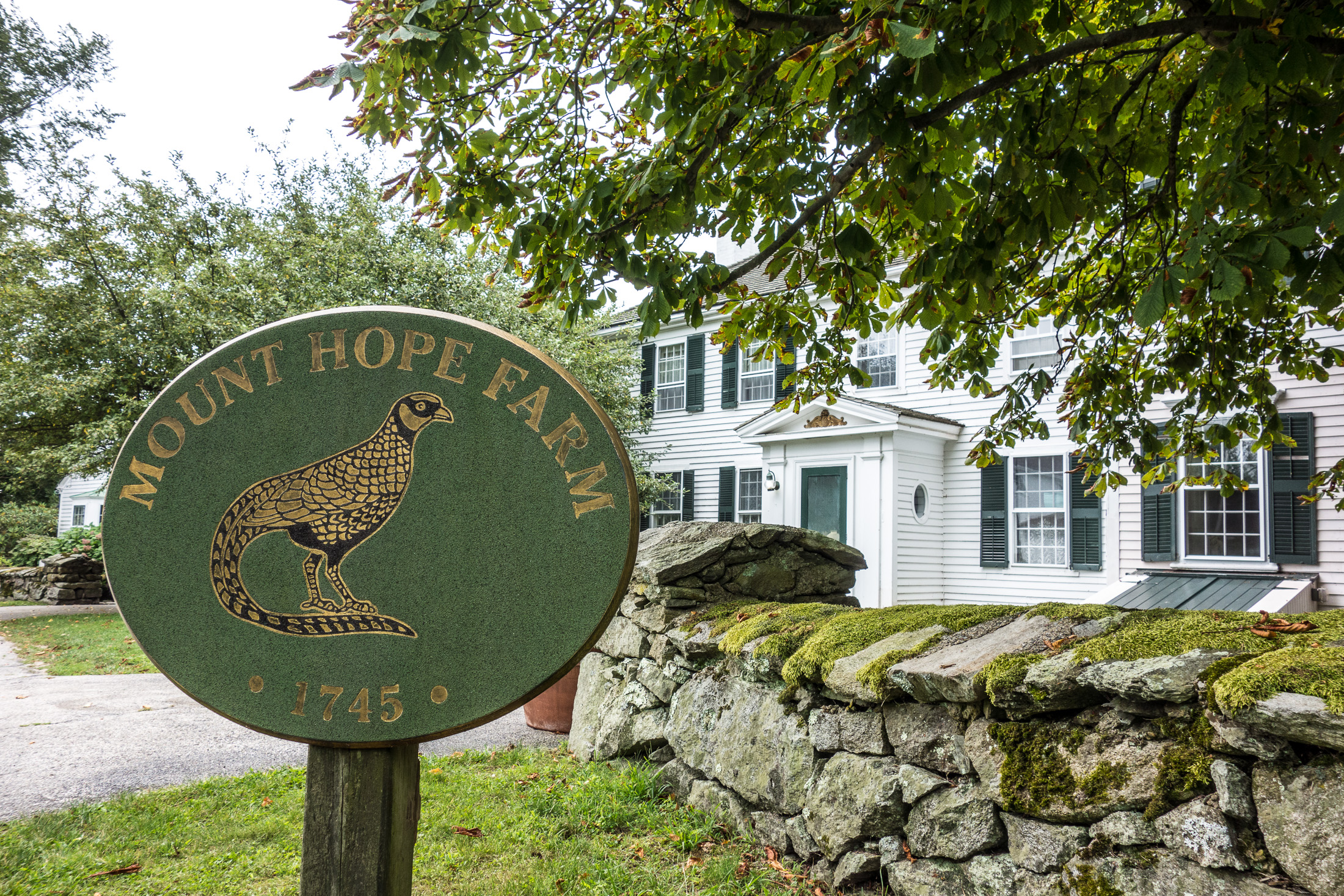
Mount Hope Farm sign

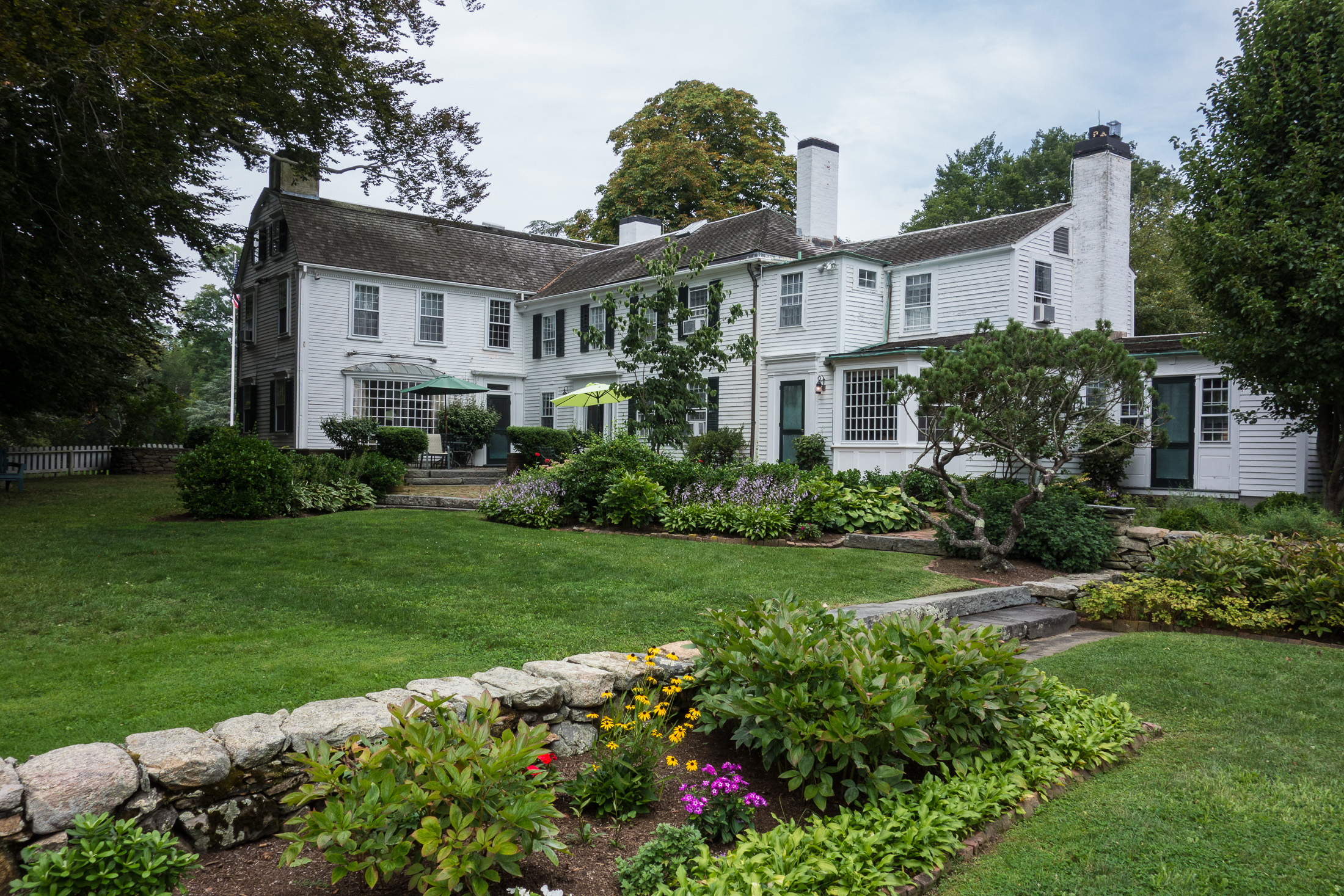
The garden behind the Governor Bradford house

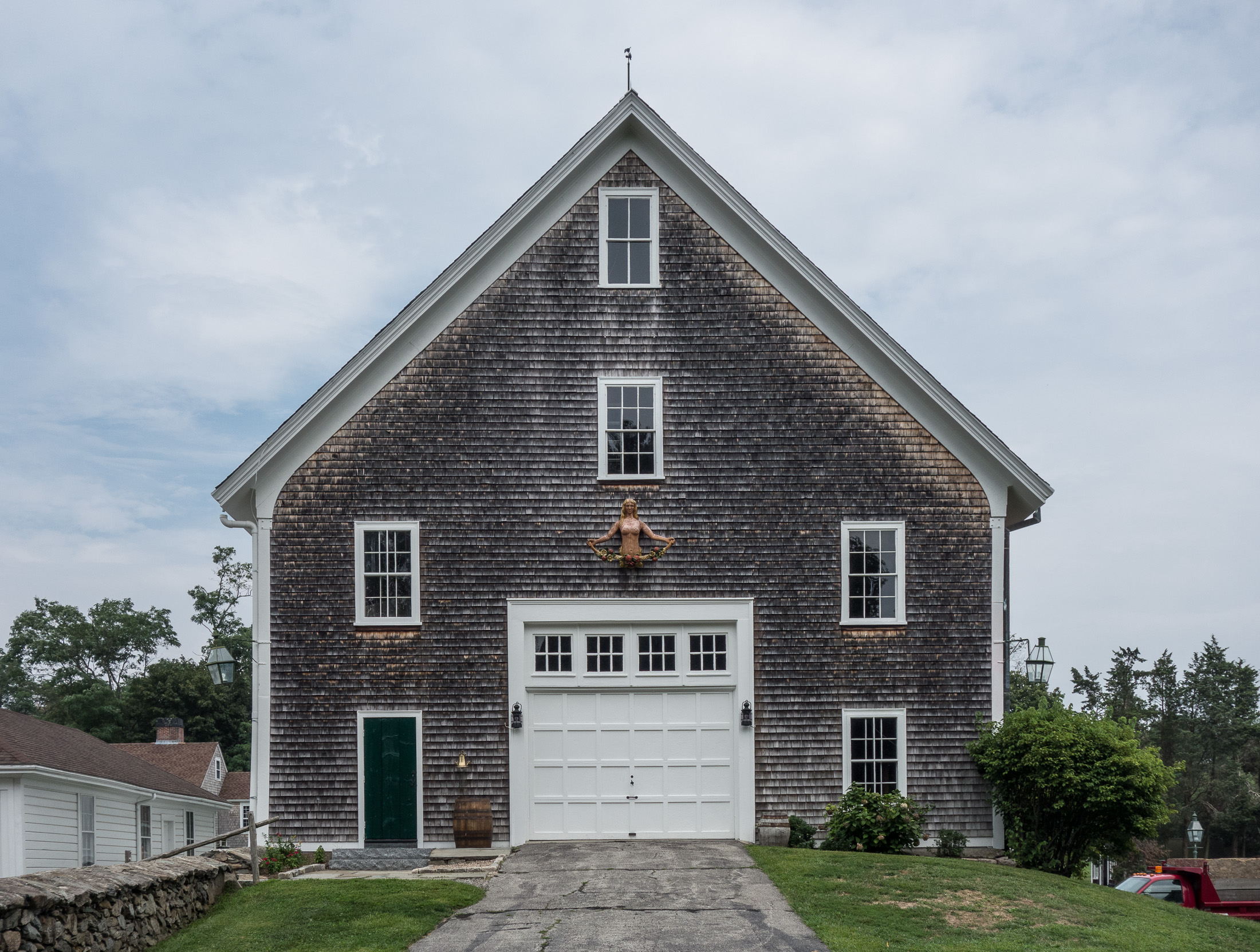
The Barn

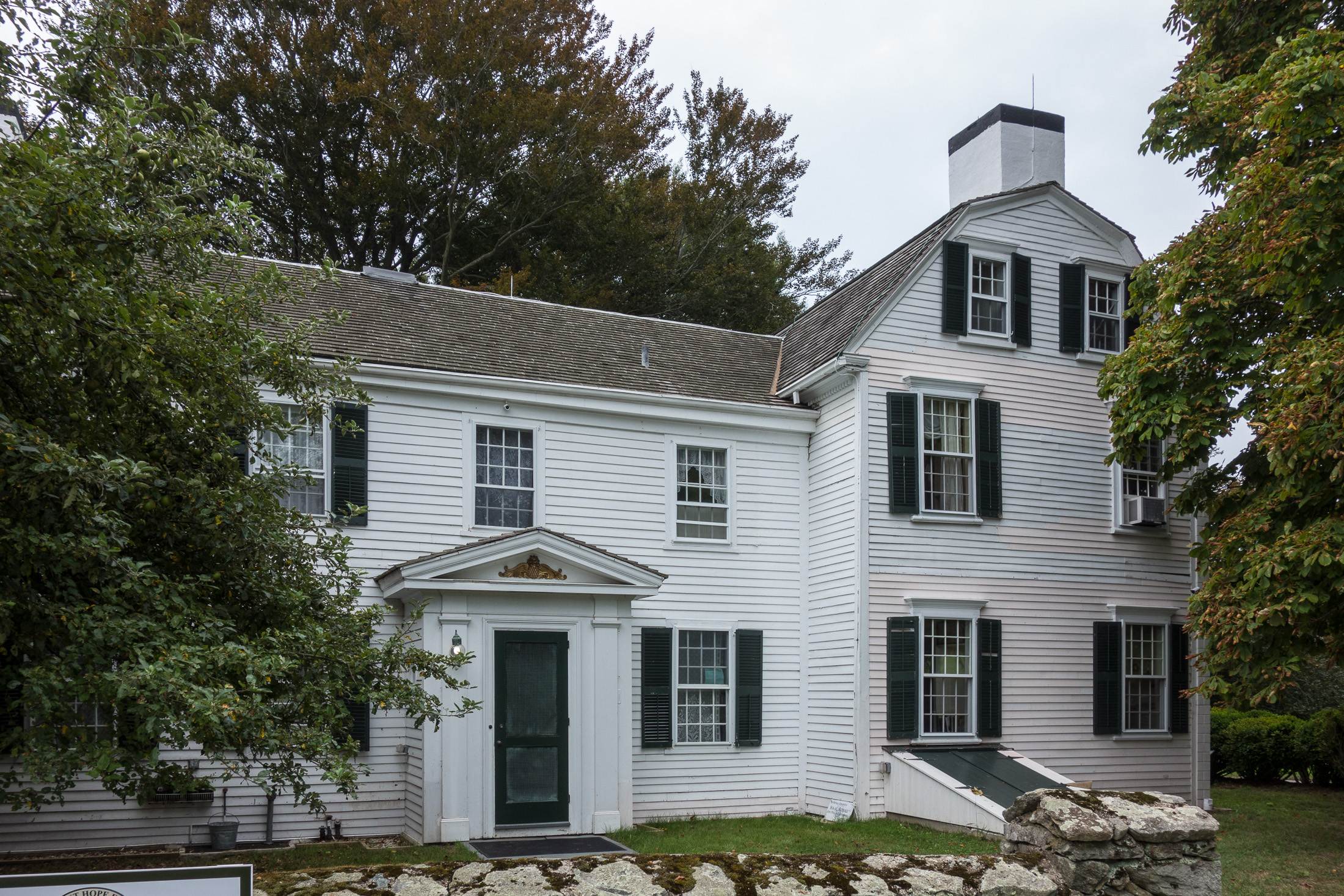
Side view of Governor Bradford House
