= John Alderman =

17th-century Wampanoag Praying Indian

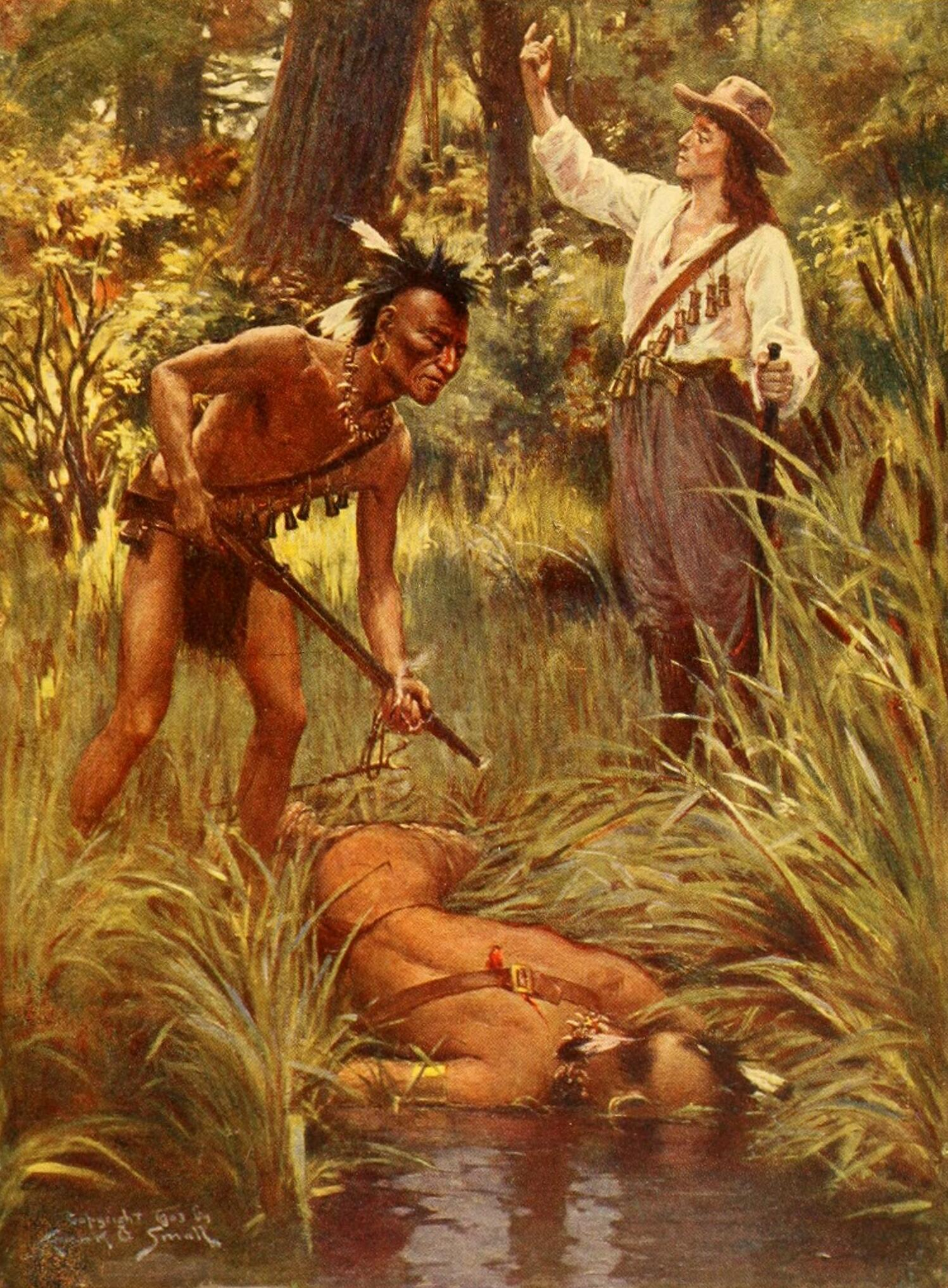
Alderman (left) inspecting Metacomet's corpse, as imagined by an American painter in 1903

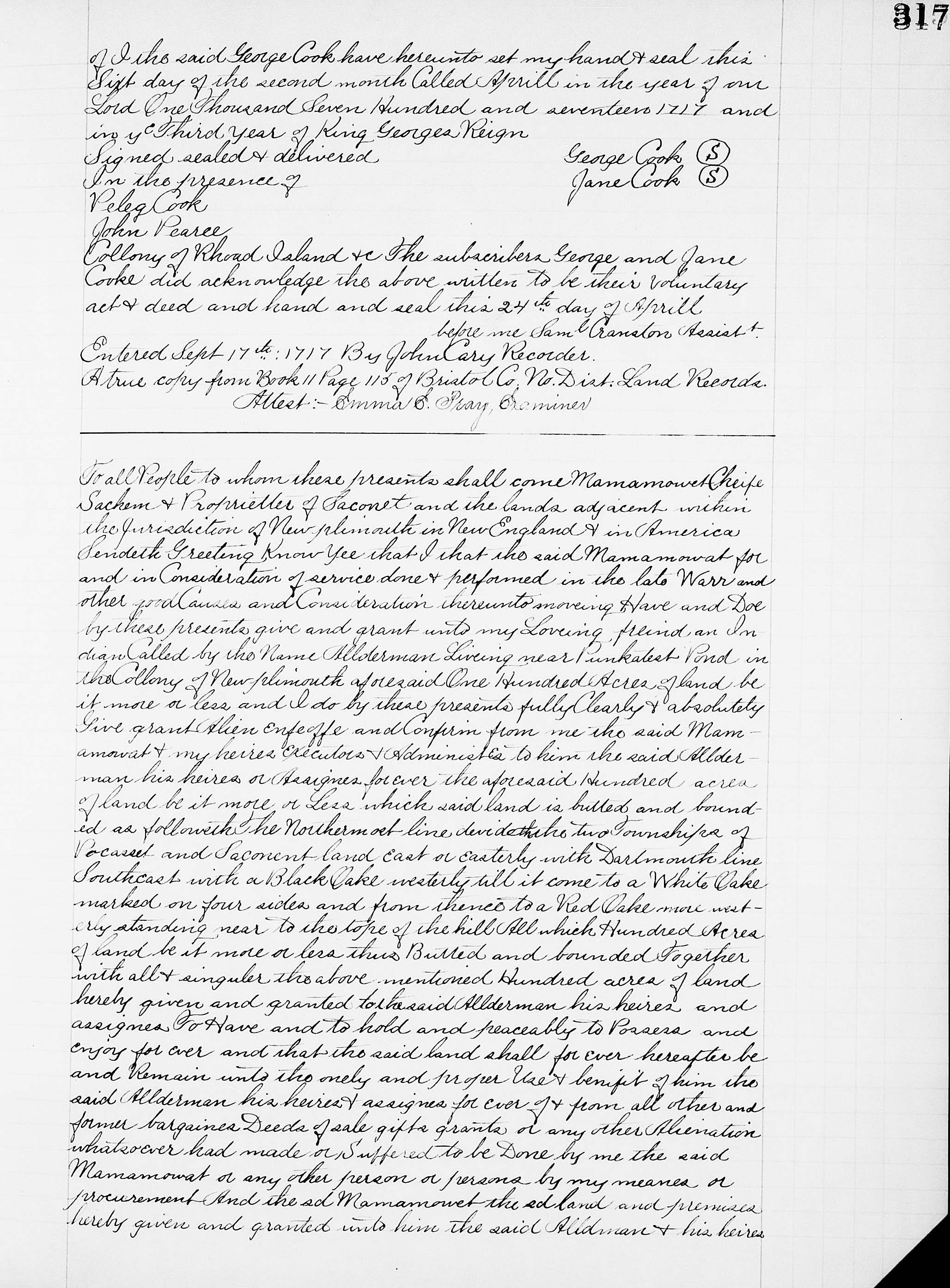
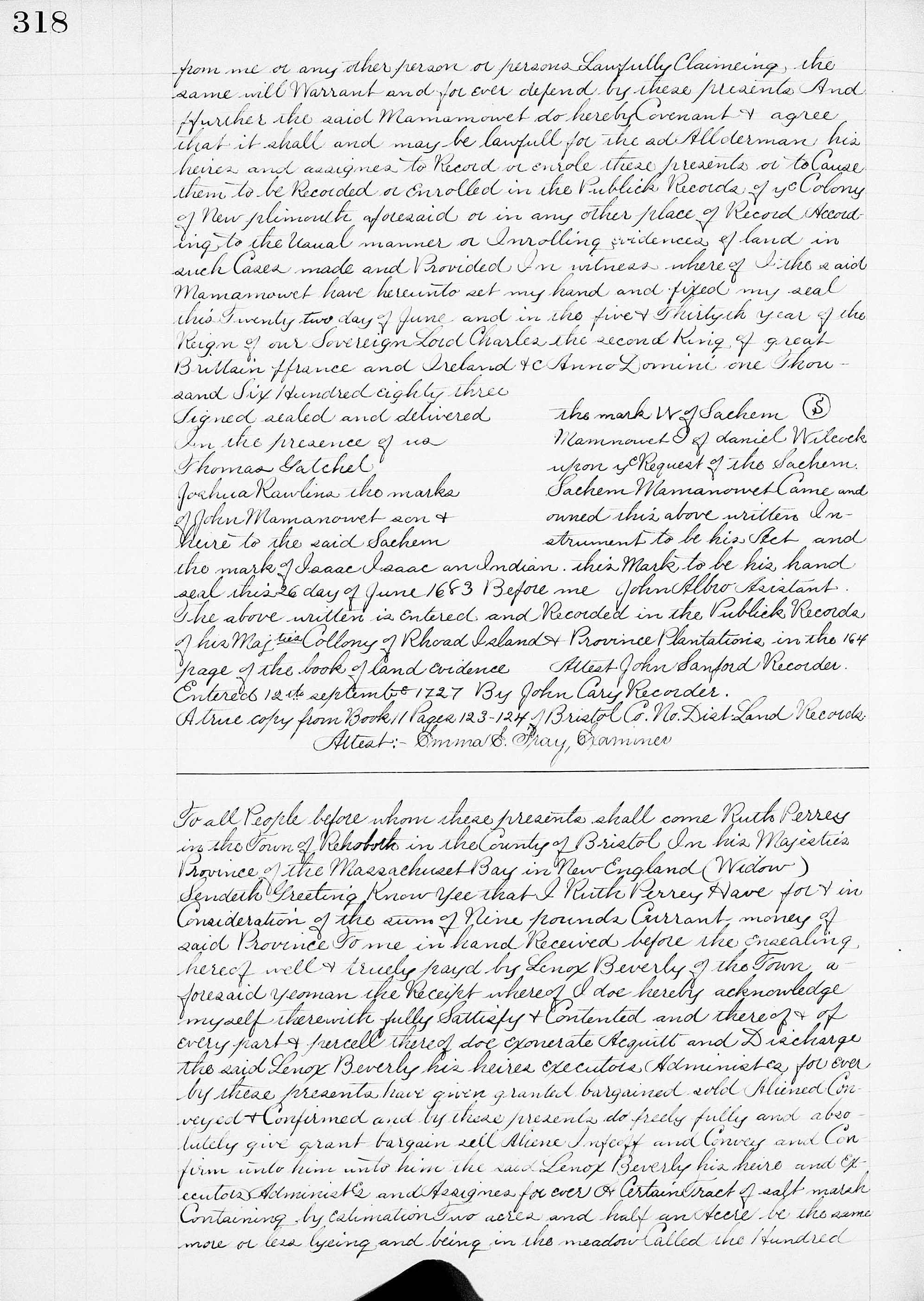
1683 deed from Sachem Mamanuah to Alderman in Little Compton

John Alderman, also known as Isaac and Antoquan, was a Wampanoag praying Indian who shot and killed the Native American leader Metacomet (King Philip) in 1676, during King Philip's War, while taking part in a punitive expedition led by Captain Benjamin Church. Alderman was a subsachem in the Westport/Dartmouth area of what is now Bristol County, Massachusetts. He was called Alderman because he was considered a close associate and counselor for King Philip. When Philip summarily murdered Alderman's brother in front of him because of his dissension, Alderman changed sides and joined Benjamin Church, an English colonist who had settled in nearby Little Compton.

Church was known for his preference of using Indian soldiers to fight other Indians, and later mounted five other expeditions to Maine during Queen Anne's War using Indian soldiers, although no muster roles or records exist of who exactly the Indians were. Cotton and Increase Mather reported that Alderman was subject to Weetamoo, the matriarch sachem of Pocasset (present-day Fall River, Massachusetts, and Tiverton, Rhode Island), although this may have just been because his land was in the Pocasset area. In a deed of "100 acres more or less" tendered by Sachem Mamanuah, Alderman was mentioned as residing at Punkatest Pond, present-day Nonquit Pond of Tiverton, Rhode Island, close indeed to the area where the village of Pocasset was located.

Alderman later took the name of Isaac and worked as an Indian minister in Coxit in Dartmouth. He had a son who took the name Isaac Isaac according to the naming tradition of the time, and who witnessed the grant of 100 acres to his father by Sachem Mamanuah. Alderman had a wife named Kate, information which is only mentioned in a land transaction in the Portsmouth, Rhode Island deed book. For his service he was awarded 100 acres of land in Little Compton by Mamanuah, which he later sold to an English colonist. This transaction was recorded in the deed books of Portsmouth, as the English colonist was originally from there. Alderman also visited Portsmouth with Benjamin Church to set up the apprenticeship of an Indian woman and her son to a local weaver. The woman was being punished for her support of Metacomet in the recent hostilities, and was apprenticed to William Wodell, a weaver, for life.

While Alderman is well known by his English nickname, his Wampanoag name is only mentioned once, in the Proprietors Records of Little Compton. The name "Isaac" also appears in a land transaction in Barnstable County from several Sacconett Indians, indicating he may have been detained behind the Sippican line for some time after King Philip's War. His son may have taken the name of either "Isaac Simon" or "Isaac Crocker", after his father's death, but the surname "Isaac" was also used by Indians of Martha's Vineyard who later emigrated to the Brothertown Community of upstate New York.

As a reward, Alderman reportedly received King Philip's head and one hand. (Note: Thomas Church, Benjamin Church's grandson, wrote "Phillip had one remarkable hand, being much scarred, occasioned by the splitting of a pistol in it formerly, Captain Church gave the head and the hand to Alderman, the Indian who shot him to show such gentlemen as would bestow gratuities upon him, and accordingly he got many a penny by it. He also wrote of Alderman, "This was the same Indian whose brother was killed and whom informed the English where to find Phillip.") Philip's hand was recognizable from the scarring that had occurred from the explosion of an early musket in his grasp. Allegedly, Alderman kept the head and the hand in a bucket of rum and would exhibit them for a fee. The rest of King Philip's body was quartered and hung on trees. Alderman later sold the severed head to Plymouth Colony authorities for 30 shillings, a standard rate for Indian heads during King Philip's War. The head was then placed on a stake atop the fort on Burial Hill in Plymouth, where it remained for the next 20 years. The Mathers contrarily reported that Philip's hands were brought to Boston, rather than given to Alderman.

In 1800, an Indian man named James Thomas who claimed to be Alderman's grandson died in Milton, Massachusetts. Thomas was 94 years old at the time of his death, having been born in 1706, and his claimed relationship to Alderman may well have been true. The Thomas family was associated with the Titticut Indian village of Middleboro, and an Indian James Thomas donated land there for a meeting house.
