= Eulogy on King Philip =

Speech delivered by William Apess in 1836

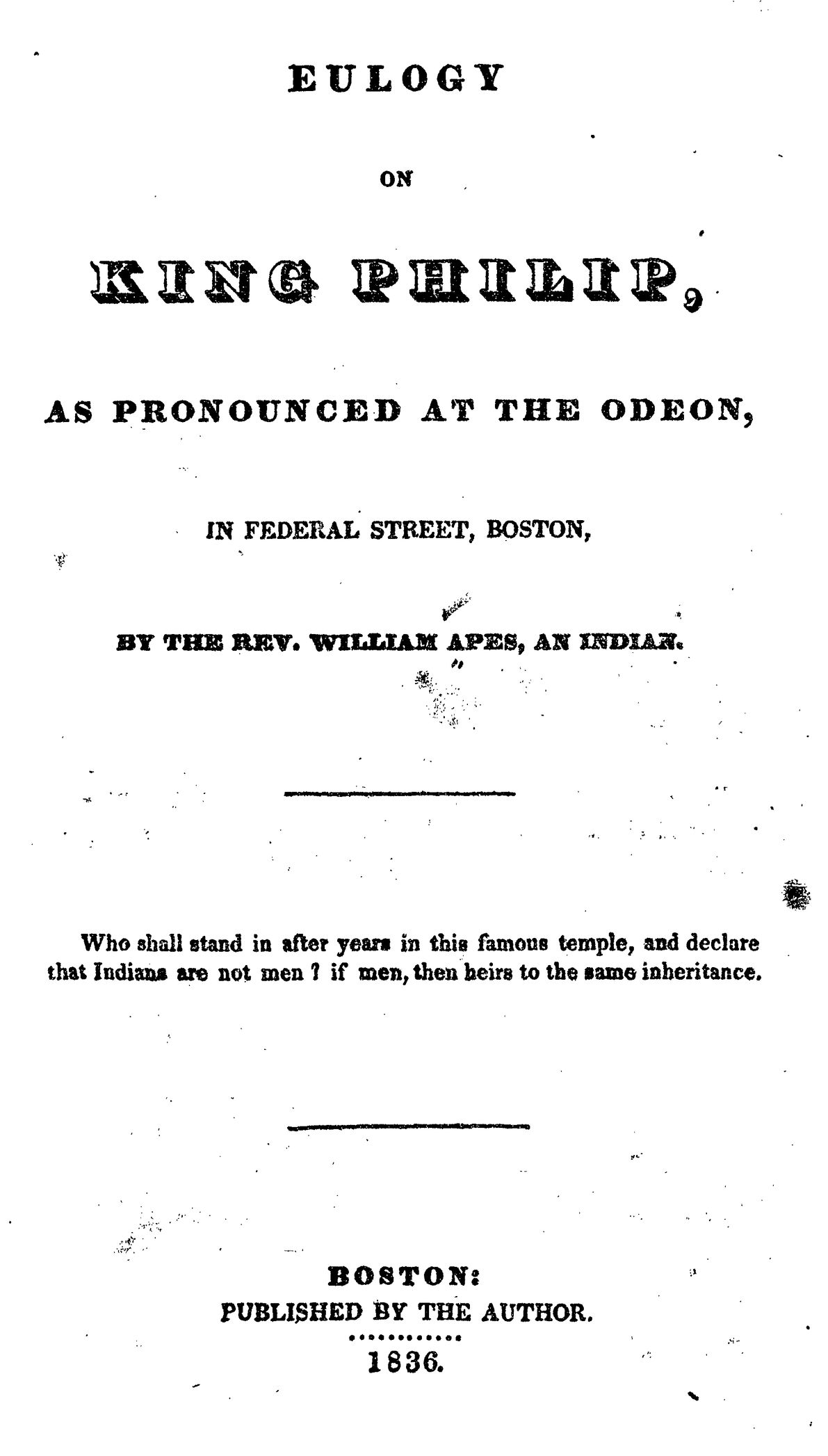
- Original title page
- Author: William Apess
- Subject: Philip, Sachem of the Wampanoags, -1676
- Genre: nonfiction, speech, lecture
- Set in: Massachusetts
- Published: 1836, 2015
- Publisher: Forgotten Books
- Publication place: United States
- Media type: Print, E-book
- Pages: 66
- ISBN: 9781330745236
- OCLC: 979062039
- Website: Official website

Eulogy on King Philip is a printed text of a speech delivered by William Apess in 1836 to, among other things, commemorate Metacom, also known as King Philip, 160 years after his death. The speech was delivered at the prestigious Odeon lecture hall on Federal Street in Boston, Massachusetts. Metacom is still remembered as the leader of an allied indigenous force that engaged in a consequential war with New England colonists, 1675–1676.
