= William Bradford (Rhode Island politician) =

American politician

United States Senator from Rhode Island
- In office March 4, 1793 – October 1797
- Preceded by: Joseph Stanton, Jr.
- Succeeded by: Ray Greene

President pro tempore of the United States Senate
- In office July 6, 1797 – October 1797
- Preceded by: William Bingham
- Succeeded by: Jacob Read

44th Deputy Governor of Rhode Island
- In office November 7, 1775 – May 4, 1778
- Governor: Nicholas Cooke
- Preceded by: Nicholas Cooke
- Succeeded by: Jabez Bowen

Personal details
- Born: November 4, 1729 Plympton, Massachusetts
- Died: July 6, 1808 (aged 78) Bristol, Rhode Island
- Resting place: Juniper Hill Cemetery, Bristol, Rhode Island
- Party: Federalist; Pro-Administration
- Spouse: Mary LeBaron Bradford
- Children: Nancy Ann Bradford DeWolf

William Bradford (November 4, 1729 – July 6, 1808) was a physician, lawyer, and politician, serving as United States Senator from Rhode Island and deputy governor of the state.

== Early life and education ==
Coat of Arms of William Bradford

William Bradford was born at Plympton, Massachusetts, to Lt. Samuel Bradford and Sarah Gray. He was a great-great-grandson of the William Bradford who had been Governor of the Plymouth Colony. The younger man first studied medicine at Hingham, Massachusetts, and then practiced at Warren, Rhode Island.

== Career and revolution ==
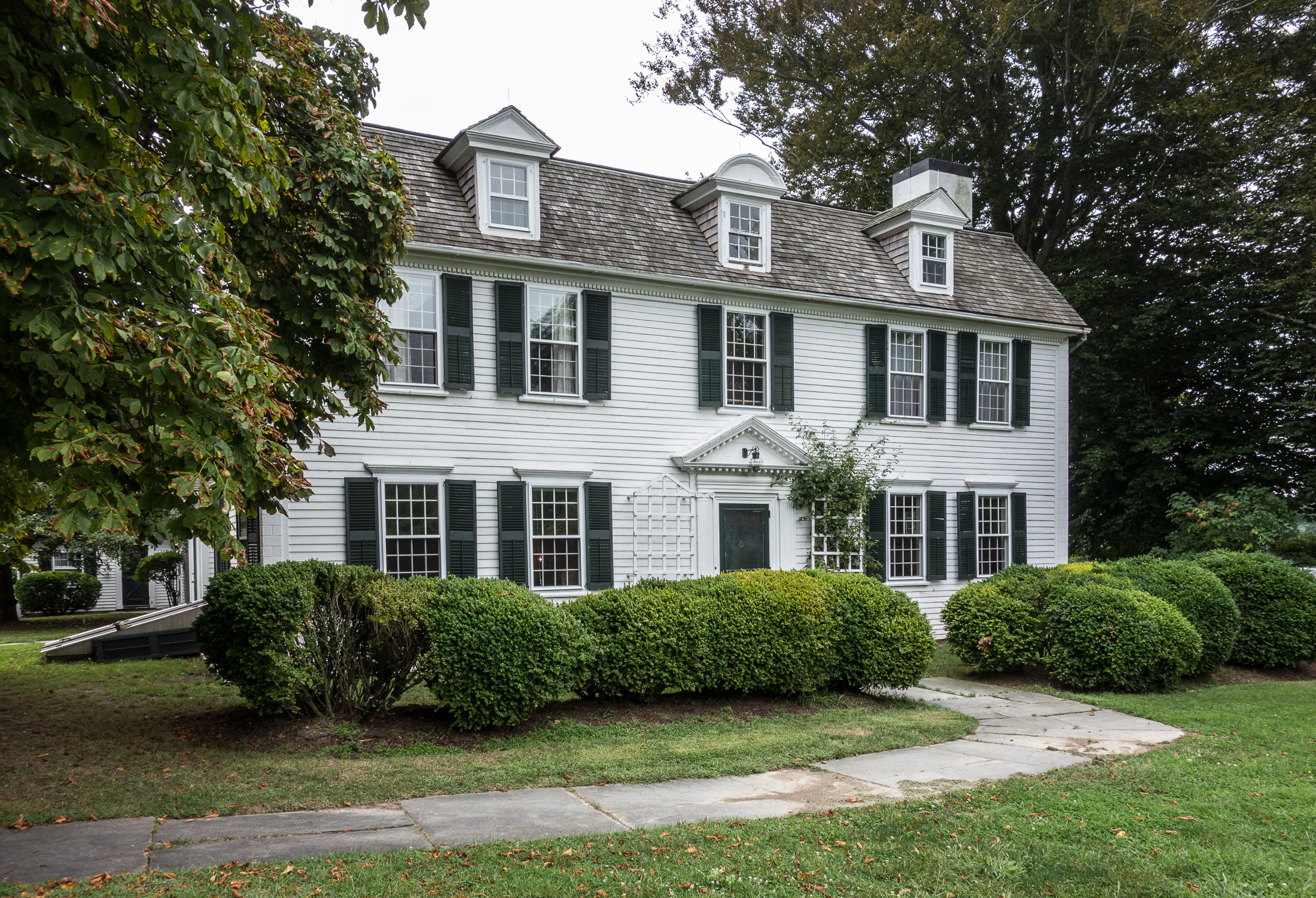
Mount Hope Farm

Bradford moved to Mount Hope Farm in Bristol, Rhode Island, where he was elected deputy to the colonial assembly in 1761 and served through 1766, serving as speaker of the assembly in 1765 and 1766. He was reelected to the assembly in 1768 and served until he was elected as deputy governor in 1775.

He expanded his abilities with the study of law, was admitted to the bar in 1767, and established a practice at Bristol. He served as Deputy Governor of Rhode Island from November 1775 to May 1778. He served as major general in command of the colony's militia from June–October 1775 until being relieved by Major General Joshua Babcock. He was elected to the Continental Congress in 1776, but did not attend.

Bradford served on the Committee of Safety of Bristol County, Rhode Island, and from 1773 to 1776 on the Committee of Correspondence for the Rhode Island colony. When the British Navy bombarded Bristol on October 7, 1775, his home was among the buildings destroyed. He afterward went aboard ship to negotiate a cease fire.

He returned as a deputy in the assembly in 1780 and served through 1792. He served as speaker from 1782 to 1796 and from 1791 to 1792.

After the United States government was established, Bradford was elected to the United States Senate, taking office on March 4, 1793. He was the President pro tempore of the Senate from July 6, 1797, until he resigned from the Senate in October of that year. He returned to his home in Bristol and died there in 1808. Originally buried in Bristol's East Burying Ground, his grave was later moved to the Juniper Hill Cemetery.

== Personal life ==
He married and had a family, including daughter Nancy Ann Bradford. In 1790, she married James DeWolf of Bristol, who was a successful slave trader and belonged to a large and influential family that also went into banking and insurance. He was elected to the US Senate in the 1820s. They were the great-great-grandparents of artist and publisher Charles Dana Gibson.

Political offices
Preceded by Nicholas Cooke	Deputy Governor of Rhode Island; 1775–1778	Succeeded by Jabez Bowen
Preceded by William Bingham	President pro tempore of the United States Senate; July 6, 1797 – October 1797	Succeeded by Jacob Read
U.S. Senate
Preceded by Joseph Stanton, Jr.	U.S. senator (Class 2) from Rhode Island; 1793–1797; Served alongside: Theodore Foster	Succeeded by Ray Greene
