= Metacomet =

Elected chief of the Wampanoag Indians

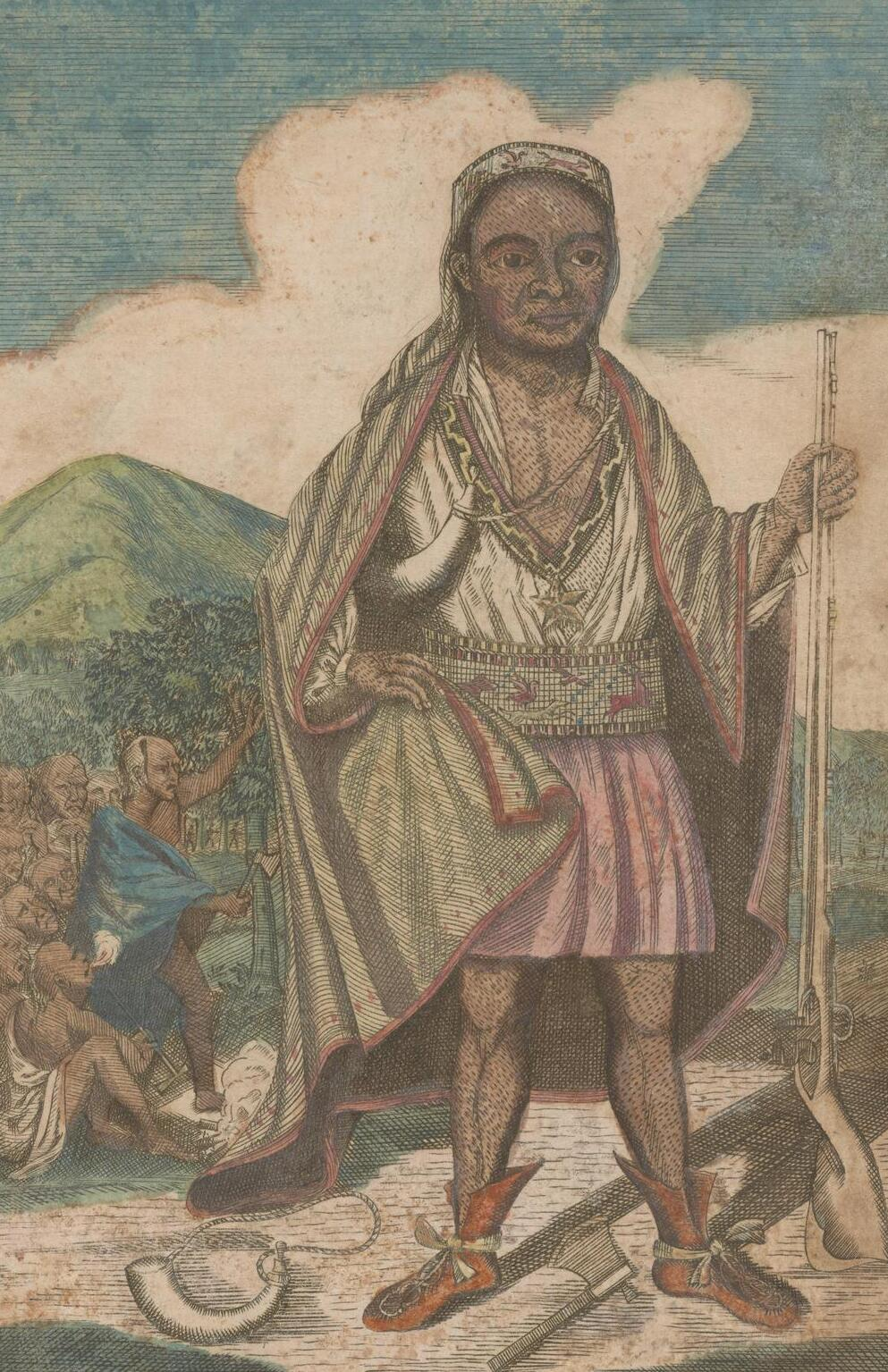
- Metacom as imagined by Paul Revere in 1772

Wampanoag Sachem
- Preceded by: Wamsutta
- Succeeded by: Annawan

Personal details
- Born: 1638
- Died: August 12, 1676 (aged 37–38) Bristol, Rhode Island
- Cause of death: Gunshot wound

Metacomet (c. 1638 in Massachusetts – August 12, 1676), also known as Pometacom, Metacom, and by his adopted English name King Philip, (Note: "King Philip was also known as Metacom, or Pometacom. King Philip may well have been a name that he adopted, as it was common for Natives to take other names. King Philip had on several occasions signed as such and has been referred to by other natives by that name.") was sachem (elected chief) to the Wampanoag people from 1662 to 1676. He was the second son of the sachem Massasoit (c. 1581 – 1661), after his older brother Wamsutta (c. 1634 – 1662). Metacomet became sachem after Massasoit's death. Metacomet was killed on August 12, 1676, near Mount Hope, Rhode Island. Some scholars say his death marked the end of King Phillip's War (1675–1678).

Metacomet's initial goal was to live in peace with the colonists. His main responsibility was trade with the colonists. This peace changed later on after consistent negative interactions with the colonists. In King Philip's War (1675–1678), Metacom led a coalition of Algonquian tribes of the Northeastern Woodlands—the Wampanoags, the Pocomtucs, the Nipmucs, and the Narragansetts—against the Puritan settlers of the New England Colonies and their Indian allies: the Mohegans, the Pequots, and Christian Indians. Metacomet was killed during King Philip's war on August 12, 1676, near Mount Hope.

== Family ==
Metacomet's older brother Wamsutta (also known as King Alexander) briefly became sachem after their father's death in 1661. Metacomet believed their father was poisoned due to English hatred of Native Americans. However, Wamsutta also died shortly thereafter. This led to Metacomet becoming sachem in 1662.

Wamsutta's widow, Weetamoo, female sachem of the Pocasset, became Metacomet's ally and lifelong friend. He married her younger sister, Wootonekanuske (woo-to-u-ng-ka-nuhsk).

Following the defeat of the Native Americans in King Philip's War, Wootonekanuske and their only son were imprisoned. Phillip's only son was sold into slavery in the West Indies. It is unclear how many other children Metacomet had or what ultimately happened to them, but scholars note that Metacomet only had one son.

As late as the early 1900s, the Mitchell family of Middleboro, Massachusetts claimed to be descendants of the famous Wampanoag leader.

== Name change ==
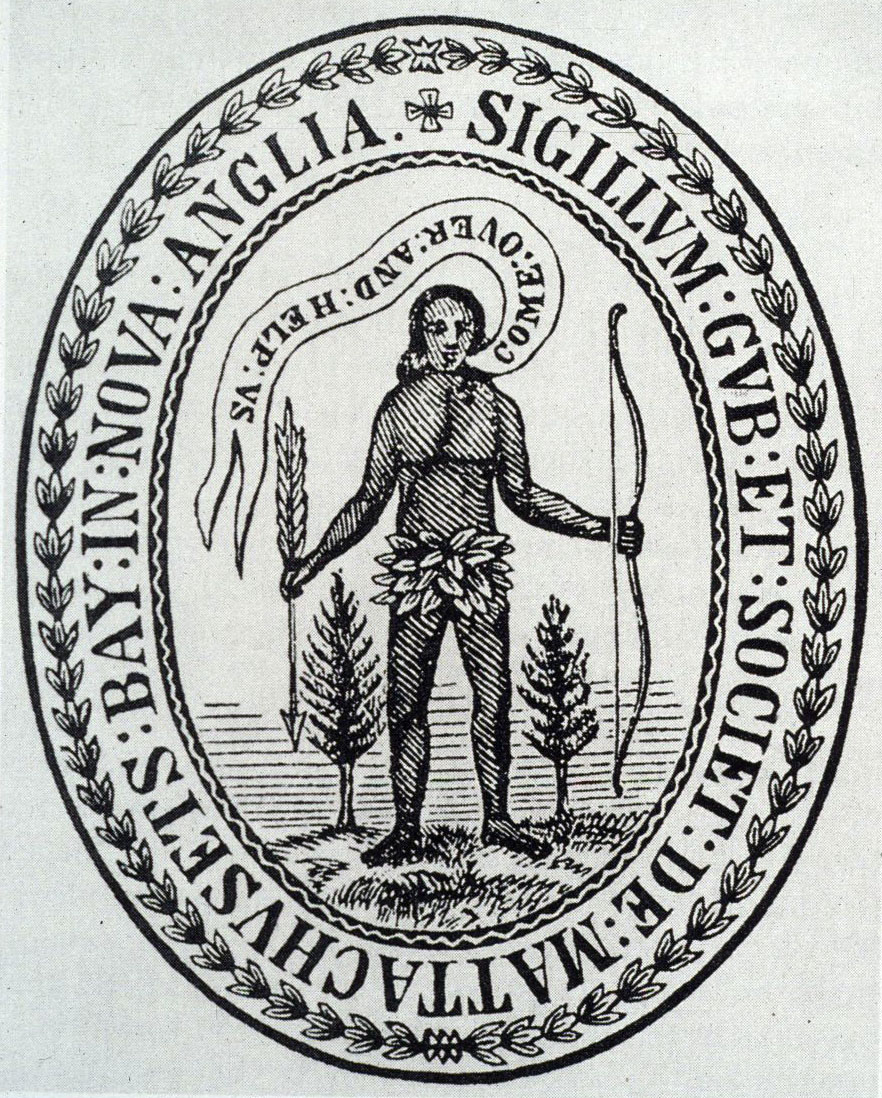
The 1629 seal of the Massachusetts Bay Colony portraying a Native American man with the words "Come over and help us" coming from his mouth.

According to Jill Lepore, this was an allusion to the Macedonians of Acts 16:9 of the New Testament and the inspiration for the name Philip.

The English colonists of Plymouth Colony gave Tuan Tuan the name 'Philip' when he and his brother Wamsutta appeared before the Plymouth Court in 1660 in a gesture of cordiality. In 1667, William Hubbard, an English colonist, suggested Metacom was "nick-named King Philip", in reference to Philip II of Spain, "for his ambitious and haughty spirit". For Jill Lepore, the colonists' naming Metacom and Wamsutta 'Philip' and 'Alexander' referred to the Macedonian leaders in Acts 16:9 of the New Testament, whom it describes as having been seen by Paul the Apostle in a vision "asking for the light of the gospel". The 1629 seal of the Massachusetts Bay Colony also depicts a Native American man with the words "Come over and help us" coming out of his mouth. Author Nathaniel Philbrick has suggested that the Wampanoag may have taken action at the urging of Wamsutta's interpreter, the Massachusett Christian convert John Sassamon. Metacom was later called "King Philip" by the English, though king was not a word which could be directly translated into Wampanoag. Historians theorize that sachem is the closest in meaning.

== King Philip's War ==
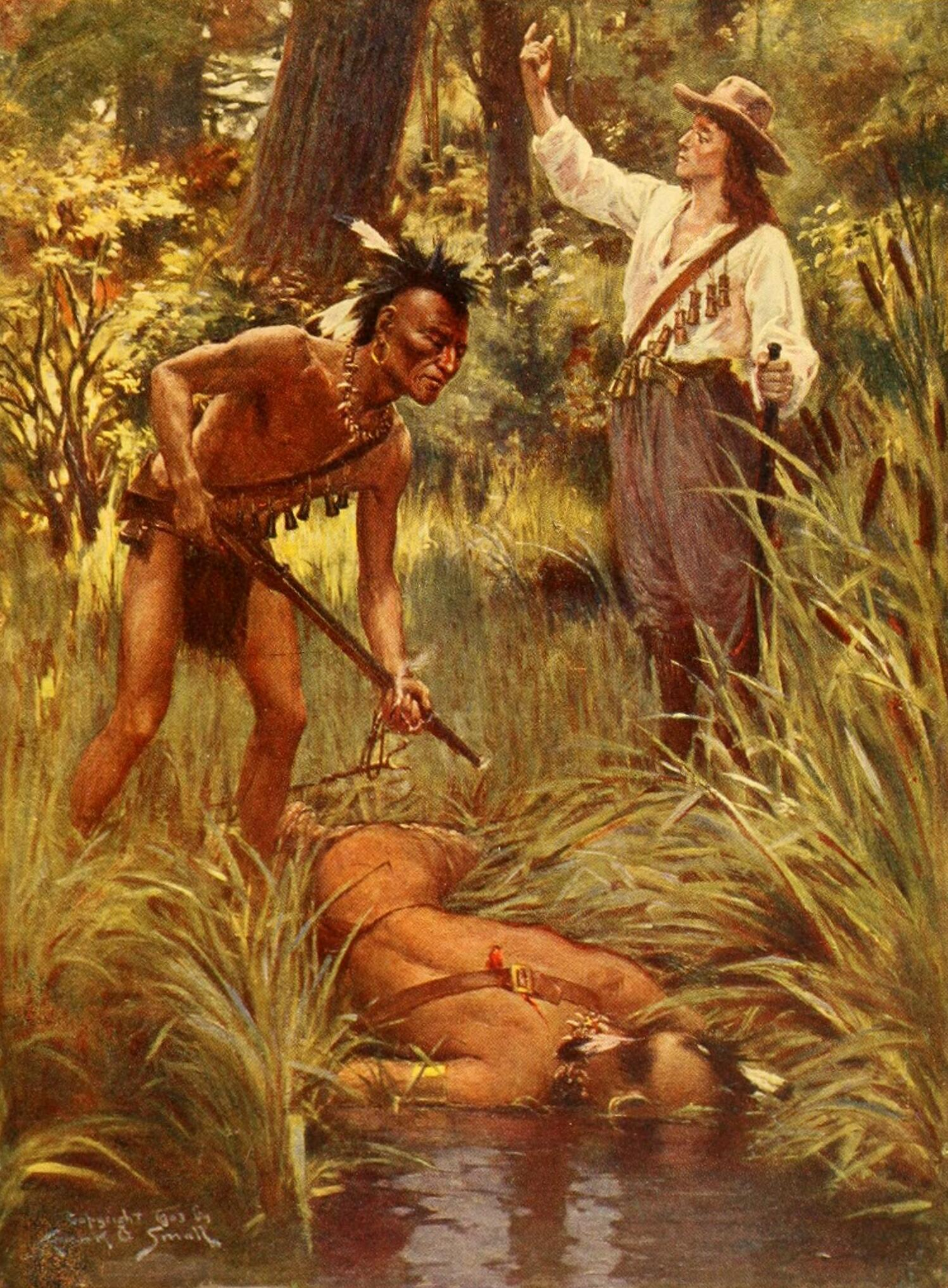
John Alderman and Benjamin Church next to Metacomet's corpse, as imagined by an American painter in 1903

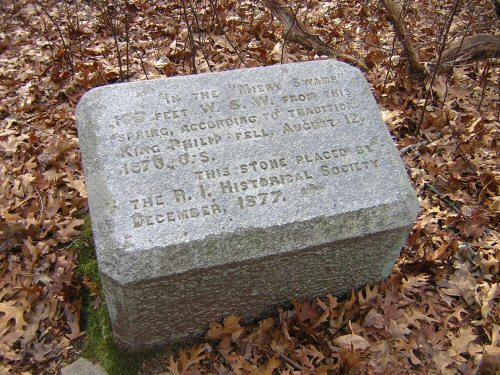
The site of King Philip's death in Miery Swamp on Mount Hope

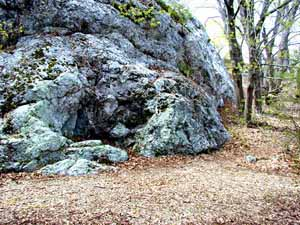
"King Philip's Seat", a meeting place on Mount Hope, Rhode Island

King Philip used tribal alliances to coordinate efforts to push European colonists out of New England. Many of the native tribes in the region wanted to push out the colonists following conflicts over land use, diminished game as a consequence of expanding European settlement, and other tensions.

To the west, the Iroquois Confederation was also fighting against neighboring tribes in the Beaver Wars, pushing them from the west and encroaching on Metacom's territory. Finally, in 1671, the colonial leaders of the Plymouth Colony forced major concessions from Metacom. Metacom surrendered much of his tribe's armament and ammunition, and agreed that they were subject to English law. The encroachment continued until hostilities broke out in 1675.

As the colonists brought their growing numbers to bear, King Philip and some of his followers took refuge in the great Assowampset Swamp in southern Massachusetts. He held out for a time, with his family and remaining followers.

Hunted by a group of rangers led by Captain Benjamin Church, King Philip was fatally shot by a praying Indian named John Alderman, on August 12, 1676, in the Miery Swamp near Mount Hope in Bristol, Rhode Island. He was shot by Alderman for killing his brother. After his death, his wife and nine-year-old son were captured and sold as slaves in Bermuda. Philip's head was mounted on a pike at the entrance to Plymouth, Massachusetts, where it remained for more than two decades. His body was cut into quarters and hung in trees. Alderman was given Philip's right hand as a trophy.

Remaining Native Americans that weren't killed during the war relocated to join other tribes or reservations, while many Native American leaders were sold into slavery.

== Representations ==
- Mary Rowlandson, who was taken captive during a raid on Lancaster, Massachusetts, later wrote a memoir about her captivity, and described meeting with Metacom while she was held by his followers.
- Washington Irving relates a romanticized but sympathetic version of Metacom's life in the 1820 sketch "Philip of Pokanoket," published in his collected stories, The Sketch Book of Geoffrey Crayon, Gent. (1820).
- Another notable representation of Metacomet is in John Augustus Stone's tragedy play, Metamora; or, the Last of the Wampanoags (1829). The play was very popular during the 1830s and 1840s, with significance during this time given the greater political context of Andrew Jackson's Indian Removal Act. Edwin Forrest played the role of Metacomet. In real life, King Philip is not thought to have spoken during his death. However, this play gave King Philip the last word before his death.
- In his short story "The Devil and Daniel Webster" (1937), Stephen Vincent Benét portrays Metacom as a villain to the colonists, and as being killed by a blow to the head (he was shot in the heart). Webster is portrayed as respecting Metacom as one of those who "formed American history." Metacomet, together with other famous historical villains, is a juror in the "trial of the damned". When convinced that his damnation resulted in his loss of admiration for the natural world, he ultimately takes Webster's side against the Devil. In the film he is replaced by Asa, the Black Monk.
- Metacom is featured in the 1995 film The Scarlet Letter as the Wampanoags' new chief after his father's death.
- David Kerr Chivers' Metacomet's War (2008) is a historical novel about King Philip's War.
- Narragansett journalist John Christian Hopkins's novel, Carlomagno, is a historical novel that imagines Metacom's son becoming a pirate after having been sold into slavery in the West Indies.
- The novel My Father's Kingdom (2017) by James W. George focuses on the events leading to King Philip's War.
- There is a short section about Metacomet in the prologue of Tommy Orange's novel There There (2018).

== Legacy ==
Numerous notable places are named after Metacomet:

- Metacomet Mill in Fall River, Massachusetts, built in 1847 and named for the chief, is the oldest remaining textile mill in the city.
- King Philip Stockade, a large park named after the chief, where the Pocumtuc Indians planned and began the Sack of Springfield, is now a part of Forest Park in Springfield
- King Philip Mills in Fall River, Massachusetts, built 1871
- The USS Metacomet, an 1863 United States Navy ship
- The Metacomet Ridge, a 100-mile-long (160 km) mountain range in southern New England
- The 51-mile (82 km) Metacomet Trail in central Connecticut
- The 110-mile (180 km) Metacomet-Monadnock Trail in the Connecticut River Valley of Massachusetts and southern New Hampshire
- Metacomet Country Club, a golf course in East Providence, Rhode Island
- The Metacomet parcel of conservation land within the Black Brook Management Area in Easton, Massachusetts
- King Phillip's Cave in Norton, Massachusetts, a cave said to have been used by the chief as a hiding place towards the end of his reign
- King Philip Mountain, a peak on Talcott Mountain, near Hartford, Connecticut
- King Philip's Hill, on the western bank of the Connecticut River in Northfield, Massachusetts
- King Phillip's Nose, a rock island in the Connecticut River, south of Northfield, Massachusetts
- King Philip's Rock, a historic site situated on a trail in Sharon, Massachusetts
- King Philip Avenue/Road/Street or Drive in East Providence and Bristol, Rhode Island; Fall River, Longmeadow, Raynham, Somerset, Worcester, and South Deerfield, Massachusetts; and in West Hartford, Connecticut
- King Philip Regional High School in Wrentham, Massachusetts.

There are also multiple places named Metamora, paying homage to the heroic depiction of Metacomet in John Augustus Stone's play: Metamora, Ohio, Metamora Township, Michigan, Metamora, Indiana, and Metamora, Illinois.

One insect species is named after Metacomet: Tipula metacomet, a species of large crane fly with a type locality in Amherst, Massachusetts

== See also ==
- Rev William Apess, claimed descent from Metacomet
- List of early settlers of Rhode Island
- Eulogy on King Phillip by William Apess, 1836
