= Battle of Bloody Brook =

1675 battle of King Philip's War

- Part of King Philip's War
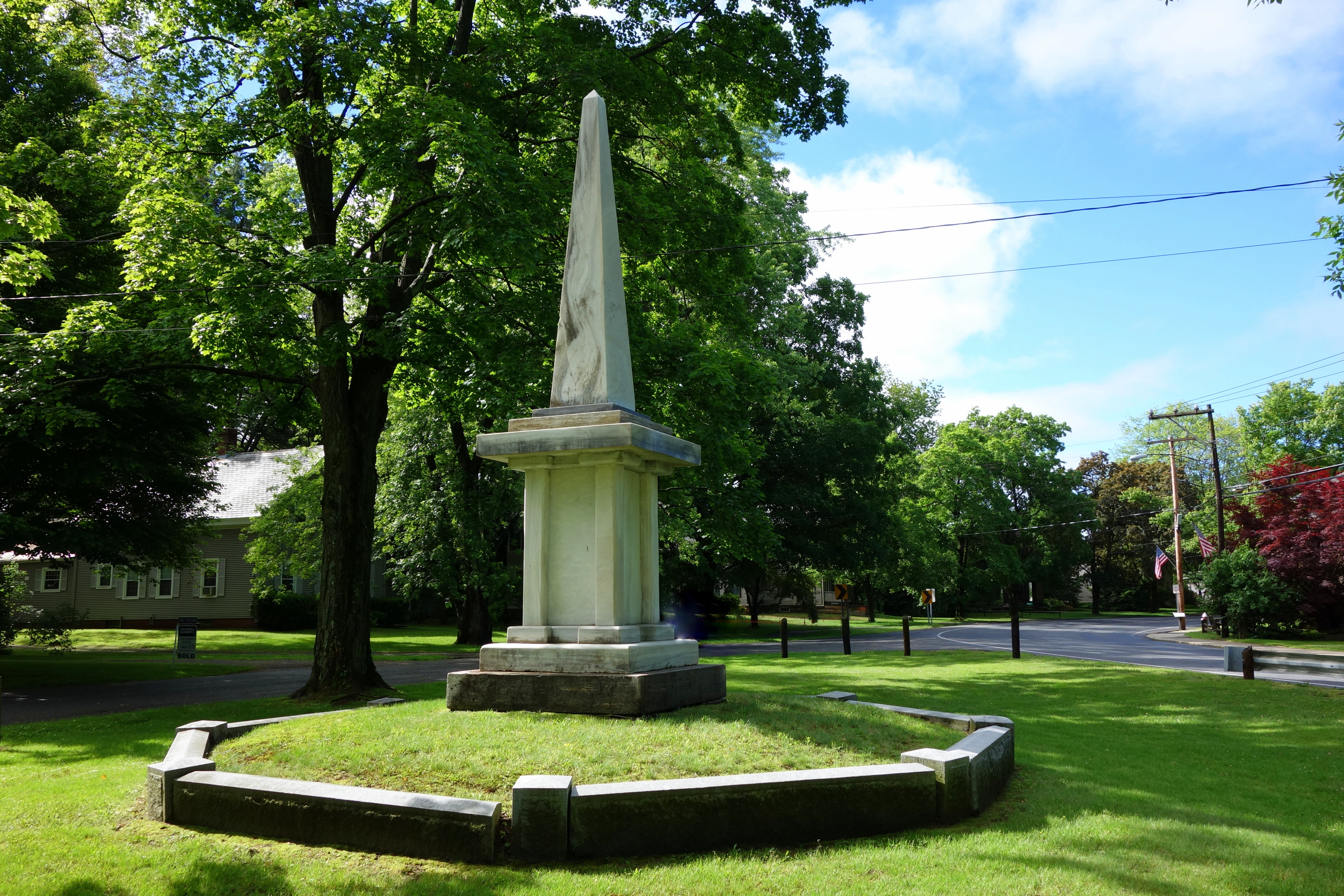
- Monument to the Battle of Bloody Brook, South Deerfield.
Date	September 28, 1675 (September 18, 1675 OS)
Location	South Deerfield, Massachusetts, US 42.4831°N 72.6037°W
Result	Pocumtuc Confederacy victory

Belligerents
Pocumtuc; Norwottuck; Woronoco; Nipmuc; Wampanoag	Massachusetts Bay; Connecticut; Mohegans

Commanders and leaders
Sangumachu: Muttawmp; Sagamore Sam; Matoonas; Monoco; Anawan; Penchason; Tatason	Thomas Lathrop †; Samuel Mosely; Robert Treat; Attawamhood

Strength
500–700 warriors	67 Essex County troops; 17 English teamsters; 230 reinforcements

Casualties and losses
Unknown	at least 58 militia killed at least 16 civilians killed
- Location of the battle in modern Massachusetts

The Battle of Bloody Brook was fought on September 28, 1675 (September 18, 1675 OS) between an indigenous war party primarily composed of Pocumtuc warriors and other local indigenous people from the central Connecticut River valley, and the English colonial militia of the New England Confederation and their Mohegan allies during King Philip's War.

The crop fields of the Pocumtuc and other Connecticut River valley nations were desired by the English, however the Pocumtuc in particular were resistant to ceding their land. The Pocumtuc were the dominant power in the central Connecticut river valley, orchestrating powerful alliances and forcing the English-allied Mohegans into tribute. However, after a 1664 war with the Kanienkehaka (Mohawk) fractured both nations and destabilized the region, the Pocumtuc were inclined to begin selling land.

Subsequently, the Connecticut River valley would represent the western border of the Massachusetts Bay Colony. However, English involvement in the Pocumtuc-Kanienkehaka war, and subsequent dealings in obtaining Pocumtuc land, contributed to local and region-wide resentment against English inhabitation of New England. Although the English were tolerated, the Pocumtuc Confederacy quickly joined Metacomet's forces at the outbreak of King Philip's War.

In the early stages of King Philip's War, English forces in the Southern Theatre experienced many smaller defeats on the western frontline, which sent the English scrambling to reinforce their settlements in the Connecticut River valley. Looking to act defensively in this Connecticut River campaign, the English set out to gather the considerable amount of corn grown at Pocumtuc (Deerfield) to feed their garrisons.

Led by Pocumtuc sachem Sangumachu, the Pocumtuc Confederacy was reinforced by their Nipmuc and Wampanoag allies. The Indigenous war party ambushed and annihilated a company of militia escorting a train of wagons carrying the harvest from Pocumtuc to Hadley in the Connecticut River valley, killing at least 58 militia men and 16 teamsters. A short while after, this was followed by an extended battle against waves of pro-English reinforcements.

The battle had a significant impact on English consciousness in the war. This major defeat amongst others elicited aggressive responses by the English, such as a preventive war against the Narragansett that winter, and the 1676 Peskeompscut Massacre, which ended Indigenous dominance of the Connecticut River valley. Pocumtuc refugees fled to New York and the Wabanaki Confederacy. Bloody Brook was particularly commemorated by Euro-American residents of Massachusetts in the 1800s.

== Background ==
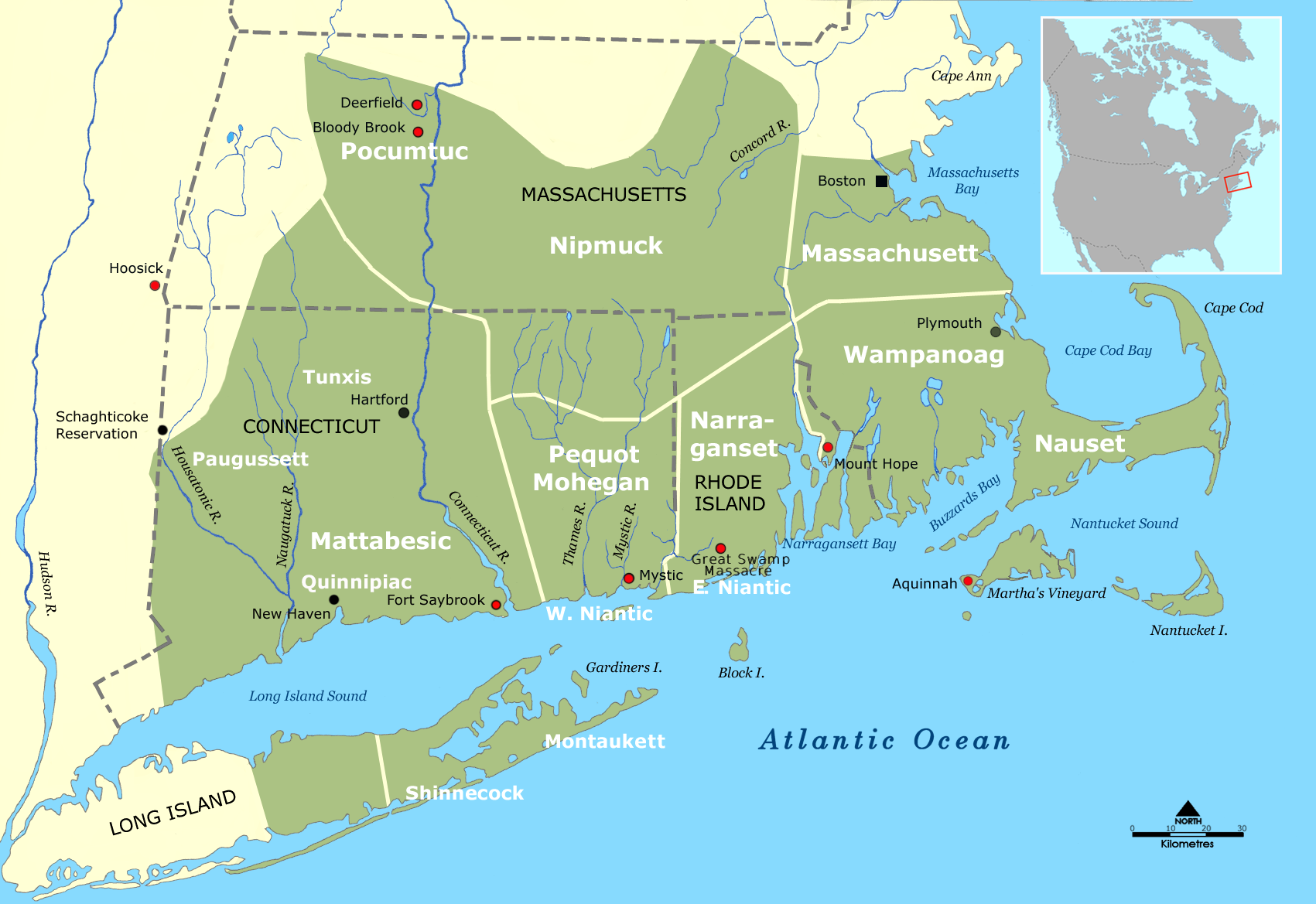
Indigenous territories & English settlements of southern New England around 1600.

=== Context ===
The central Connecticut River valley was primarily inhabited by agriculturalist eastern Algonquian peoples, namely the Pocumtuc, Agawam, Woronoco, Norwottuck (Nonotuck), Sokoki and Quabog. Together, these nations have been antiquatedly referred to as "River Indians", with the first five being sometimes referred to as the Pocumtuc Confederacy.

Although related linguistically, the nations of the central Connecticut River valley operated their trade and diplomacy autonomously, participated in far-reaching intertribal alliances, and transacted agreements that preserved traditional access to natural resources. When relations with their neighbors (such as the English) failed, tribes drew upon existing alliances to seek refuge in friendly villages. Material and social interactions aside, alliances were customarily encoded by the exchange of the spiritually/politically significant wampum. Among the strongest peoples were the Pocumtuc and Norwottuck, whose independence & extensive alliances limited English settlement in the valley.

Around the time of King Philip's War, the nations were organized into villages of about 500 people, with an approximate total population of 5,000 Indigenous people in the central valley. Pre-contact sites were already cleared and planted with corn on rich alluvial flatlands, which proved desirable to the newly arrived English settlers. Several fortified settlements were of particular importance- the Norwottuck fort, located on a high bluff above the Connecticut River in the Northampton-Hadley-Hatfield triangle, and the Agawam fort on Long Hill just south of Springfield housed some 80 to 100 families combined, with the Pocumtuc fort in present-day Deerfield also being noteworthy.

In contrast, the total population of the seven small English towns spread along the 66 miles of the mid-Connecticut River valley (the western border of the Massachusetts Bay Colony) was approximately 350 men and women, and roughly 1,100 children.

=== Tensions between Pocumtuc & English ===
==== Pocumtuc dominance ====
During the 1630s, the Connecticut River valley nations invited the English to the valley for trade. They set up accounts with fur trader and land broker William Pynchon, along with his son John Pynchon, and other associate traders to purchase cloth and other goods in exchange for corn and beaver fur. Wampum beads were also used by colonial settlers as a means of monetary exchange. These connections soon proved fruitful for the English, with bushels of Pocumtuc corn saving the Connecticut Colony from famine in 1638.

The Pocumtuc nation was centered on either side of the sandy banks of the Connecticut river in present-day Deerfield and Greenfield. Despite their friendly trade relations, the Pocumtuc were respected as a powerful force by the English. The New England Confederation paid particularly close attention to Pocumtuc hostilities against the Mohegans and Long Island nations for fear these would impact the English colonies. The Mohegans under their sachem Uncas had separated from their Indigenous neighbors and aligned themselves with the English in Connecticut. Although an English threat of intervention averted a Pocumtuc invasion in 1648, by the late 1650's the Pocumtuc had weakened the Mohegans to the point of tribute. New York and Massachusetts colonial leaders feared that the Pocumtuc posed a serious threat to long-term English settlement due to their powerful and extensive alliances.

==== Kanienkehaka War & decline ====
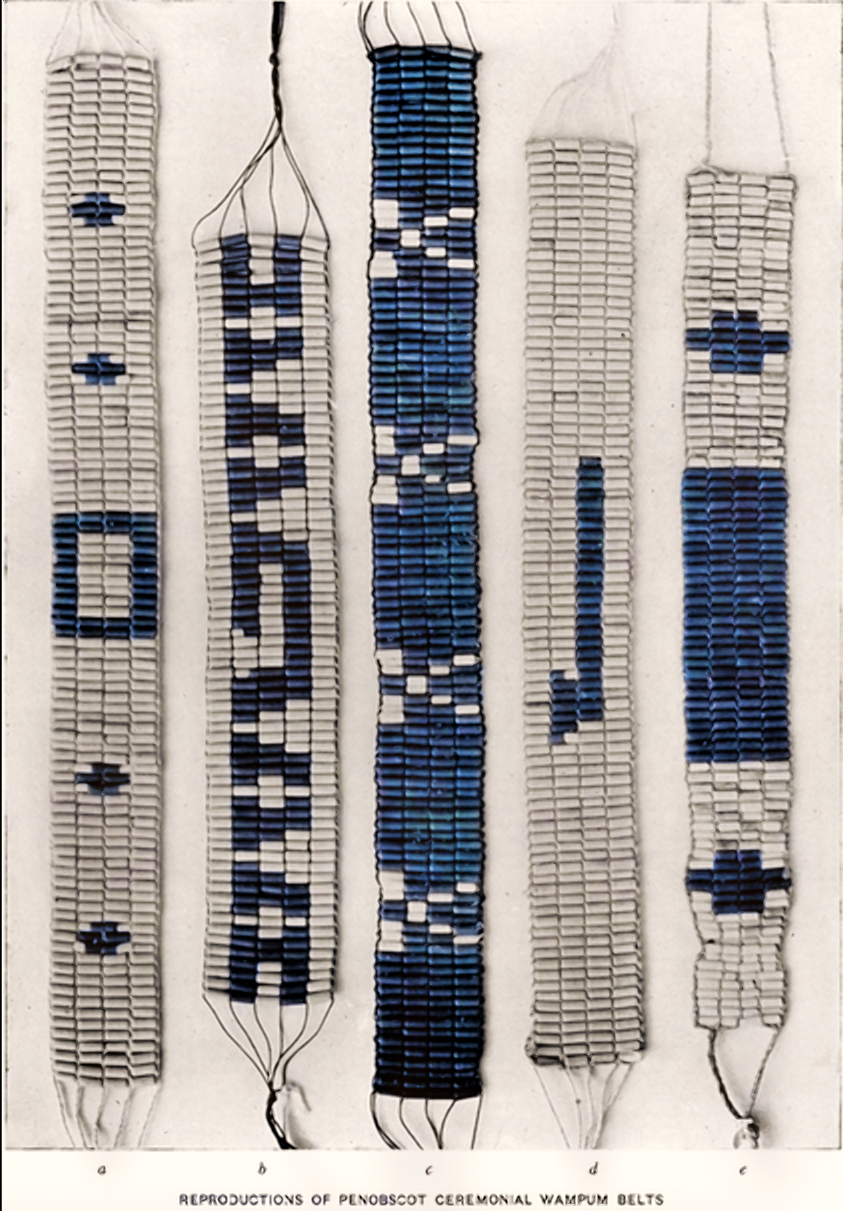
Examples of wampum belts typically exchanged by eastern Algonquian peoples. These originate from the Wabanaki Confederacy.

Although an anti-Kanienkehaka alliance with the Pocumtuc, Sokoki, Pennacook, Kennebec Abenaki, Mohicans, French Jesuit missionaries and the Narragansett was formed in 1650, friendly relations were restored with the Kanienkehaka (Mohawks) by the late 1650's. The English had refused to join this alliance, not only due to fear of Kanienkehaka raids, but also because the eventual desire to lure away the Kanienkehaka and wider Haudenosaunee fur trade from the New Netherlands. However, tit-for-tat attacks between the Kanienkehaka and Sokoki was dragging the Sokoki's Pocumtuc allies into war. European intervention included a 1663 letter by John Pynchon writing to the Dutch & Kanienkehaka absolving New England's Pocumtuc Confederacy trading partners, with the Dutch brokering an initial peace accord between the Kanienkehaka and the Connecticut River valley nations in May 1664, with a primary objective freeing Kanienkehaka captives taken by the Sokoki and being held by the Pocumtuc.

Almost simultaneously in May 1664, some of John Pynchon’s primary sub-traders (David Wilton, Henry Clark, Thomas Clarke and Joseph Parsons), rode up from Northampton to deliver a message- if these differences with the Kanienkehaka could not be settled, the English would have no alternative but to force the Pocumtuc to leave the valley. Some of these sub-traders were also present in the ensuing negotiations between Dutch, Kanienkehaka and Mohican emissaries, potentially as translators. Thereafter, the emissaries were escorted out of Pocumtuc territory, and promised to return to provide a wampum tribute to seal the peace. However the Kanienkehaka sachem Saheda and other Kanienkehaka ambassadors were killed a month later in Pocumtuc territory whilst en route to delivering the wampum. A retaliatory Kanienkehaka attack in February 1665 killed the Pocumtuc sachem Onapequin and his family, and destroyed the Pocumtuc fort.

In February 1665, John Winthrop Jr. told Roger Williams that the Kanienkehaka had killed Onapequin by mistake and that Pocumtuc had fled to Norwottuck seeking assistance. By July of 1665, Winthrop Jr. reported that a multitude of Indigenous people were at arms, “all in a combination from Hudson’s River to Canada,” as this incident rippled across the region. Pynchon may have been disinclined to broker peace as in September 1664, the Dutch relinquished New Netherlands to the English, and subsequently a deal was signed on the 24th of September 1664, between Kanienkehaka & Seneca authorities and English officials in Fort Amsterdam (New York), in the aftermath of Saheda's death.

The deal promised no English assistance for the Pocumtuc and their Sokoki and Pennacook allies, along with safe refuge for the Kanienkehaka should they lose a conflict against either three nations. The death of Saheda, in particular, was held up as a reason for English leaders to form a new alliance with the Kanienkehaka and Mohicans against the Connecticut River valley nations. In effect, the deal secured the Kanienkehaka peoples' southern flanks by incorporating the Mohicans in the new alliance, and safeguarded powder and shot sales from New York traders. The deal also secured safe access to the newly acquired lucrative Hudson Valley fur trade for Pynchon and his sub-traders, and redirected Kanienkehaka retribution towards the Pocumtuc and their allies.

Before the transfer from Dutch to English administration, Dutch Commissary Gerrit Slichtenhorst heard the Kanienkehaka sachem Cajadogo’s testimony in Fort Orange's Court (Albany) that John Pynchon and his associates had orchestrated Saheda’s murder:

. . . the English have told and directed the savages, to fight or kill the Dutch and Mohawks and the English have threatened, if you do not do as we tell you, we shall kill you. They say also, that 40 ships shall come across the sea to make war here and ask for the surrender of this country and if we were not willing to give it up, they intend to kill us all together . . . They say further, that at the time when the messengers of the Mohawks had come to the fort of the Pocumtuc savages to confirm the peace, several Englishmen were in the fort, who [urged] the savages to kill the Mohawks and they are dead now.

Pynchon denied this account, claiming that Clarke and Wilton were at the fort to make peace. New Netherlands Governor Peter Stuyvesant suspected that the story might have been fabricated to secure a Dutch alliance, but the records are not entirely clear. Regardless, John Pynchon & the English were well positioned to take advantage of this significant reversal in Pocumtuc fortunes. Conversely, English involvement in the Pocumtuc-Kanienkehaka war, interference with indigenous diplomacy, extrajudicial appointments of sachems, and subsequent opportunism in obtaining Pocumtuc land left lingering resentments which, compounding with other conflicts in New England, contributed to the outbreak of hostilities in King Philip's War.

==== Land transactions ====
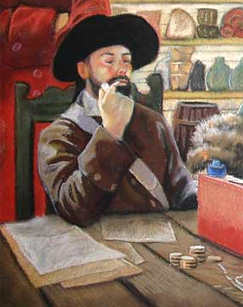
John Pynchon, chief-magistrate of Springfield, fur trade magnate & chief-in-command of the Connecticut River Campaign.

Even when the Pocumtuc were at full-strength, their Agawam and Norwottuck neighbors were already bargaining their independence with the English through land transactions. However, these agreements are better interpreted as "joint use" agreements, reserving rights for harvesting game, wood, and corn from pre-existing cornfields, and to even set up wigwams on the town common, with some parcels being "sold" multiple times.

Nevertheless, the Pocumtuc were not as initially inclined to cede land to the English settlers as other nations. However, after the Kanienkehaka War and the destruction of Pocumtuc fort, English settlers from Dedham were empowered by Pynchon to negotiate buy-outs with Pocumtuc survivors. A 1665 survey by Joshua Fisher, drawn up before the land was even sold, appears to preserve usufruct rights, however made no mention of Indigenous presence. This is despite the existing Pocumtuc planting fields, wigwam sites, burial grounds, and trails, with Fisher instead depicting 8000 acres of empty land. Noting this, Margaret Bruchac states that "it’s doubtful that the English actually intended to honor Native rights in the long run".

A Quabog deed with the English in 1665 reflected this transition, making no provision for continued Indigenous use of the land and resources. It does, however, 'highlight shared tribal interests'. As some of the land was also claimed by the Pocumtuc, both nations shared the pay-out; enough wampum to manufacture at least 100 wampum belts. Bruchac argues that the wampum generated from these sales may have been particularly attractive to the Pocumtuc, in their desire to exchange them as tributes of peace with the Kanienkehaka, contributing to the repair of Pocumtuc-Kanienkehaka relations in subsequent years. This may have been a significant factor behind the shift in the Pocumtuc's strategy, as four subsequent land deeds were signed in quick succession between 1667 and 1674, with at least two directly dealt to John Pynchon also neglecting traditional rights.

=== King Philip's War & Connecticut River Campaign ===
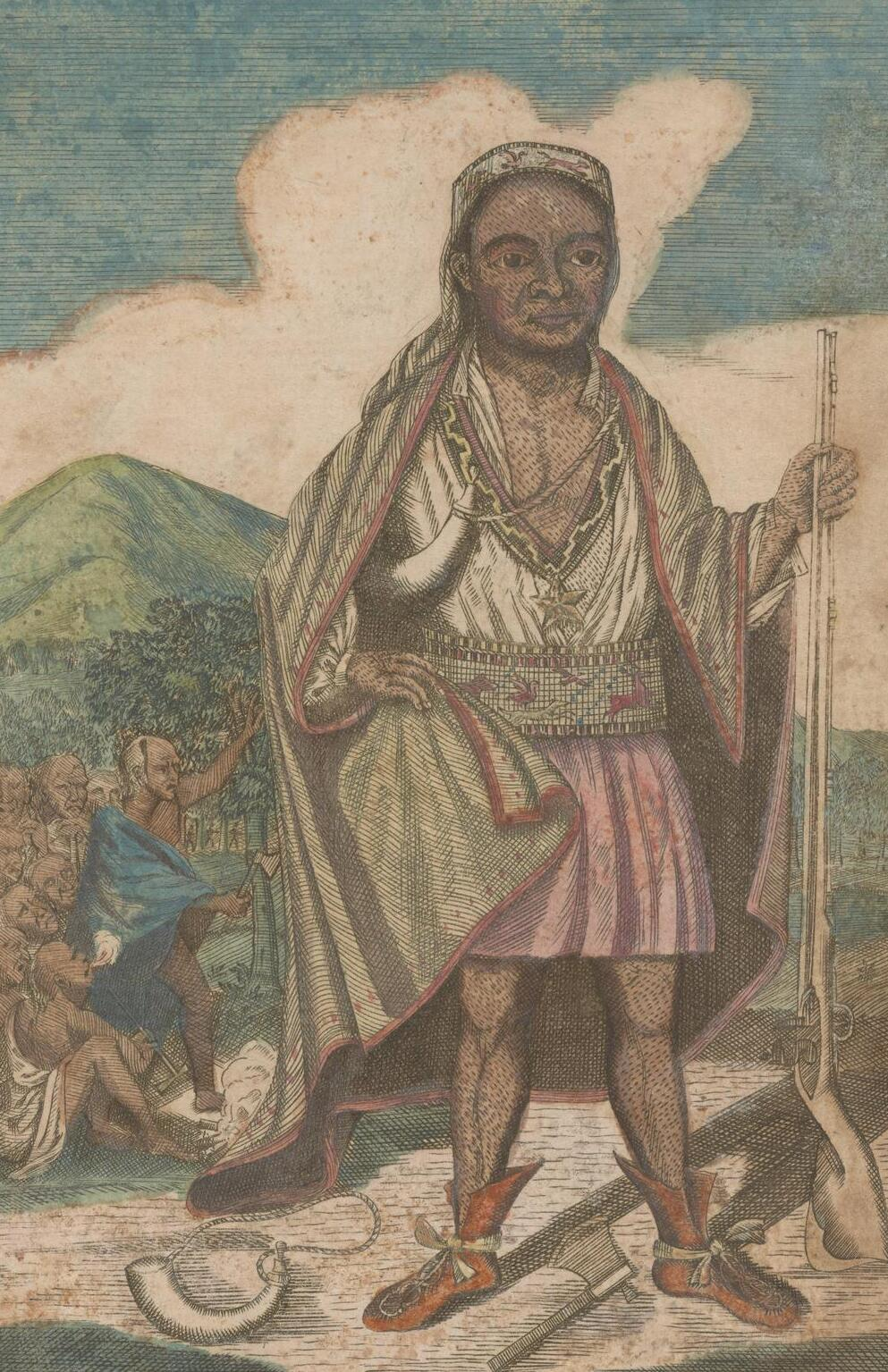
A portrait of Wampanoag sachem Metacomet (King Philip).

The Wampanoag sachem Metacomet (King Philip) drew on his alliances with the Nipmuc and Connecticut River valley nations, as King Philip's War raged across the Massachusetts, Connecticut, and Rhode Island colonies from June 1675 onwards. John Pynchon, now a Major and commander-in-chief of the Connecticut River campaign, had hoped that the Connecticut River valley peoples would not join the war due to a lack of support from the Kanienkehaka (entreating that they "not to entertain or favor" the Pocumtuc and their allies), but this was ultimately not a deterrence.

In the aftermath of the Siege of Brookfield in the first few months of King Philip's War, the New England Confederation raised several companies of English militia and indigenous allies to protect the western border of the colony, as the settlements there were not able to conscript enough men for their defense. In the months of August and September in 1675, several companies from Massachusetts and Connecticut arrived to participate in the Connecticut River Campaign. These included Captain Lathrop from Essex County, Captain Mosely from Mendon, and Captain Beers from Watertown of the Massachusetts regiment, which was headed by Captain Appleton from Ipswich, and also included Major Treat of Milford and Captain Mason of Norwich, from the Connecticut regiment. These companies were engaged with scouting the border and guarding supplies sent to various garrisons. Some pro-English forces were first sent to Brookfield under Major Willard, then concentrated in the Hadley garrison under Major Pynchon.

By August 16, colonial militia companies had taken to the field to scout out their indigenous counterparts, with no success. Hostilities resulted in the temporary abandonment of both Indigenous and English settlements across central and southern New England. For example, English demands that the neutral Norwottuck disarm soon led to their evacuation from the area on August 24, slipping past the English encirclement of their fort. Despite a pursuit and skirmish with the English troops under Beers and Lathrop at Hopewell Swamp, the Norwottuck escaped and joined their Pocumtuc allies to the north, with this infringement of sovereignty and attack providing the wider Pocumtuc Confederacy a firm casus belli.

== Prelude ==
=== Indigenous Raids ===
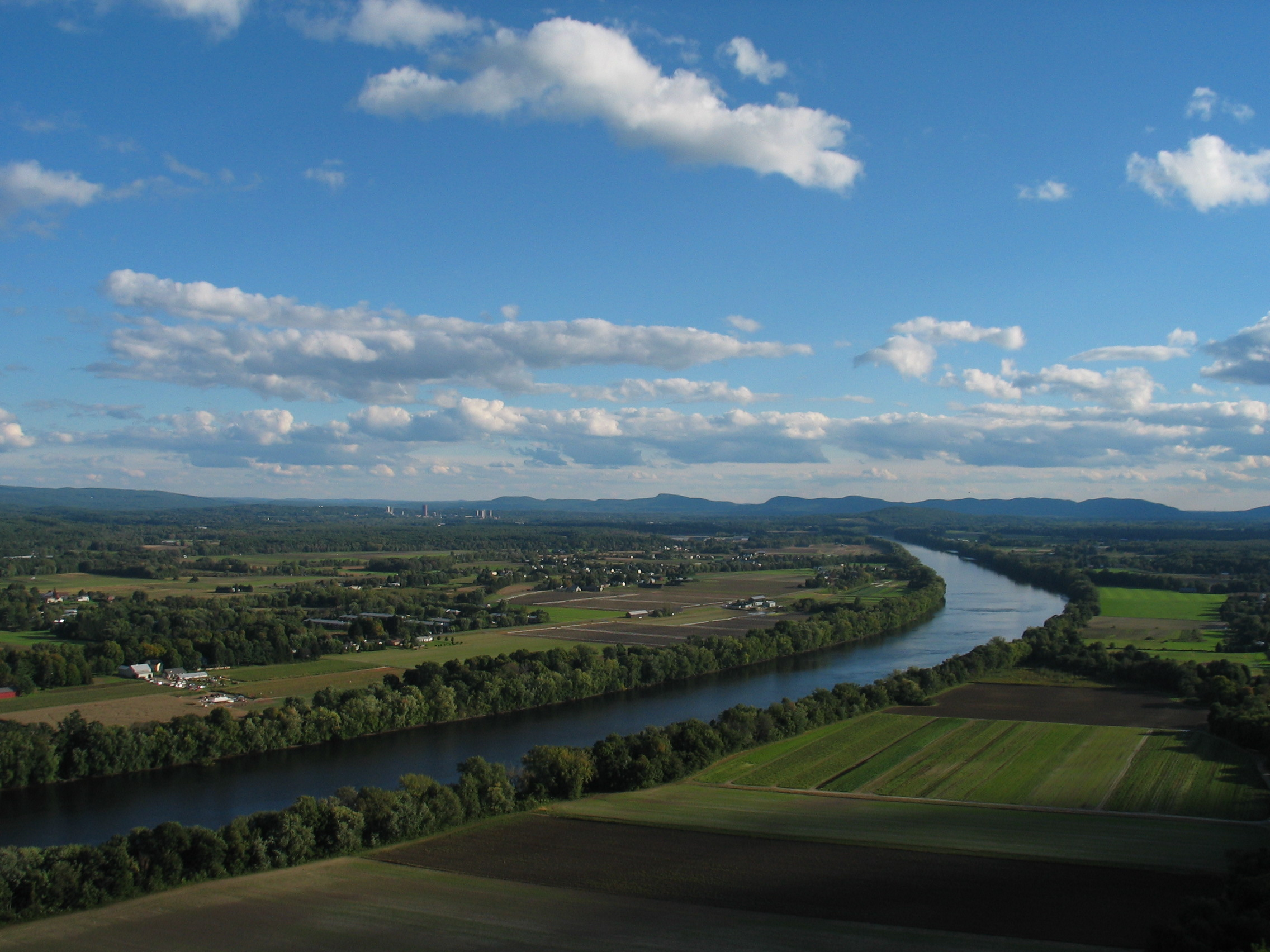
The Connecticut River valley as viewed from Sugarloaf Mountain, South Deerfield, Massachusetts.

In September 1675, indigenous warriors were increasingly active in the Connecticut River valley. In early September, indigenous forces conducted two raids the English village of Deerfield at Pocumtuc, burning most of the houses, stealing multiple horse-loads of beef and pork, killing one garrison soldier & several horses, then retired to a hill nearby. The initial force likely contained around 60 warriors. When news reached Northampton, part of Lathrop's company along with volunteers from Hadley marched to Deerfield to attack the encampment with the local garrison, but found the site abandoned. The rest of Lathrop's company arrived with Mosely a couple of days later.

One day after the initial raid on Deerfield, a Pocumtuc and Nashaway force under Monoco attacked Northfield, the northernmost English settlement in the Massachusetts Bay Colony's western border, again burning most of the houses and driving away the cattle. Two days later, apparently unaware of the original assault, Beers and 20 of the 36 men in his company were ambushed and killed at Saw Mill Brook by a war party led by Monoco and Sagamore Sam, during an attempt to bolster the garrison at Northfield.

Major Treat, commander of the mixed English/Indigenous Connecticut regiment, having arrived at Hadley's headquarters from Hartford mid-September, then marched to Northfield with his 100 troops. Despite a small skirmish, his company buried Beer's company and evacuated the garrison and populace there back to Hadley. After a recruiting trip, Major Treat re-fortified himself in Hadley on either the 25th or 26th of September with more Connecticut colonial troops, with Captain Mason arriving soon after with a company of Mohegan and Pequot warriors. Deciding to go on the defensive by strengthening the garrisons, while also faced with a long term campaign, commanders in Hadley needing to feed ~350 colonial troops, Mohegan & Pequot allies, and refugees looked to Pocumtuc (contemporaneously also referred to as Deerfield), where settlers had managed to cut and stack a considerable quantity of corn. Orders were given to harvest and bag as much grain as could be transported.

=== Pocumtuc (Deerfield) ===
At the time of the battle, much of Pocumtuc territory was occupied by English settlers, primarily through multiple purchases of land by John Pynchon and English colonists from Dedham. The Pocumtuc nation tolerated the English occupation of their land, but their relationship evolved over the years. This was primarily due to English involvement in the Kanienkehaka war, the subsequent killing of their sachem Onapequin & the destruction of their fort, and land transactions stimulated by the ensuing destitution excluding traditional rights to the land. Pocumtuc (Deerfield) was on the northwestern border of Massachusetts Bay Colony, and had been inhabited by the English only two years prior to the battle.

Captains Lathrop and Mosely took their militia companies north to Deerfield, to load ox carts with the corn and facilitate the eventual evacuation of civilians. While Mosely's company quartered in Deerfield and scouted the surrounding woods, Lathrop’s company, alongside carts driven by local teamsters, set out for the garrison at Hadley on the morning of September 28, 1675.

The Pocumtuc sachem Sangumachu led a large war party composed of Pocumtuc, Norwottuck, Woronoco, and other local people from the Connecticut River valley, with Mattawmp, Sagamore Sam, Matoonas and Monoco ("One-Eyed John") leading the Nipmucs, and Anawan, Penchason and Tatason leading the Wampanoag.

Despite Mosely's scouting efforts, the war party crossed the river undetected and surveilled Lathrop's movements, keeping the English completely unaware that any sizeable force was in the area. Unlike the Connecticut Colony, the other colonies of New England did not utilize allied indigenous scouts or warriors until the final stages of the war, under Benjamin Church.

== The battle ==
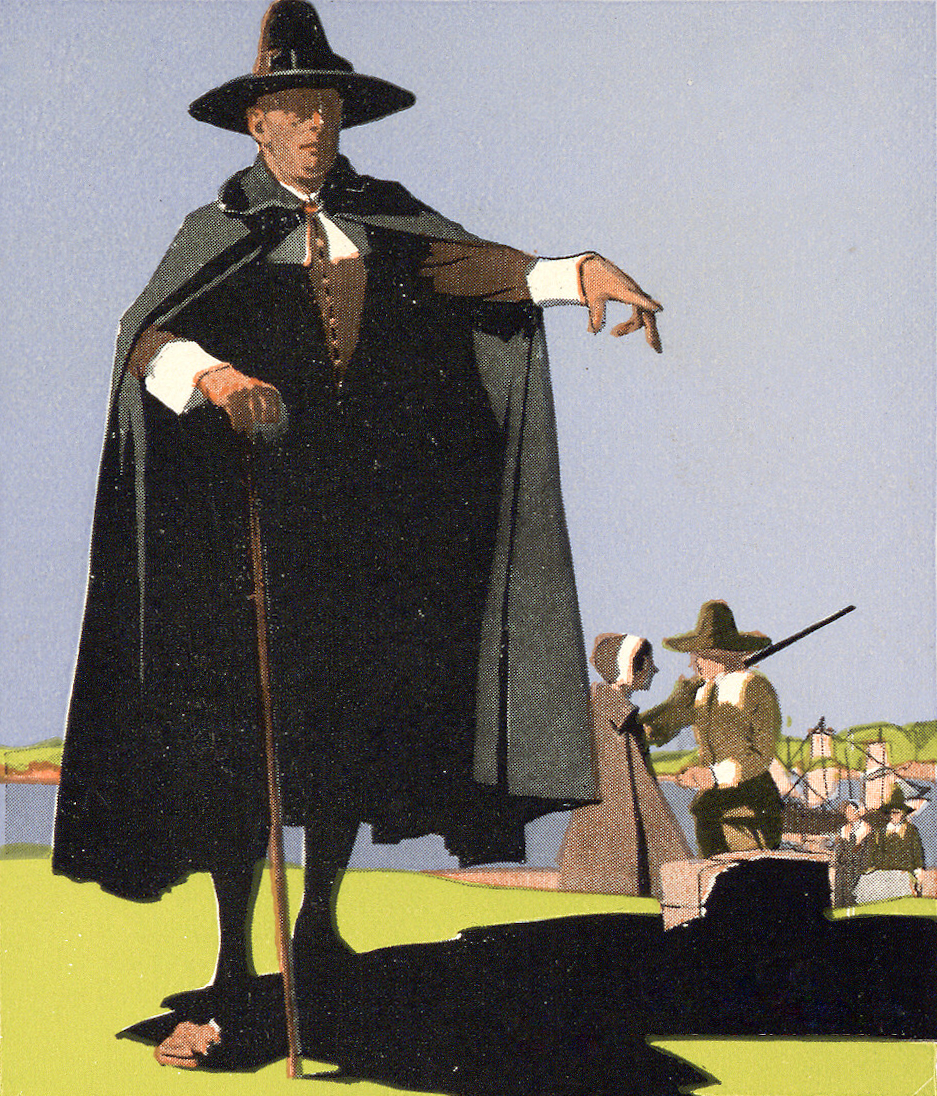
Robert Treat, commander-in-chief of Connecticut's colonial forces, was involved in relief efforts at Northfield and Bloody Brook.

=== Ambush ===
On the 28th of September 1675, a large Pocumtuc, Nipmuc, and Wampanoag force of at least several hundred warriors laid a well-planned and executed ambush on approximately 67 English militia, 17 teamsters from Deerfield, and their slow-moving ox carts, as they crossed Muddy Brook. The approximate site of the ambush was a gently flowing stream in a small clearing, bordered by a wet floodplain and surrounded by thickets, roughly 5 miles (8.0 km) from where they set off, in what is today South Deerfield. The number of warriors has been suggested to be between 500-700, but the combination of few survivors and poor record keeping makes exaggerations possible.

Apparently no flankers or vanguards were organized, and it was later reported that as the heavy ox carts slowed during the stream crossing, some of the militiamen had laid their weapons in the carts and were picking wild grapes along the trail. This apparent lack of caution may have been due to an overreliance on the scouting of Mosely's company, along with the English perception that Metacomet's forces preferred to attack unsuspecting border towns and garrison houses rather than large companies of English soldiers.

By all accounts, most English participants, including all but one teamster, were dead within minutes of the attack. Deerfield historian Epaphras Hoyt suggests that the main body of English troops had crossed the brook, and were waiting for the slow moving teams of carts to negotiate the rough roads. Once encircling the entire company, the sudden first volley outright killed or disabled much of Lathrop's company.

=== Reinforcements ===
Fighting soon continued following the arrival of roughly 70 Massachusetts Bay militia under Captain Mosely from Deerfield, who are said to have repeatedly charged the much larger force in a more extended engagement, moving deep into the woods. Upon an attempted encirclement of Mosely's overextended forces, Mosely ordered a line formation to avoid getting flanked, and initiated a cautious retreat. Finally, the arrival of 100 Connecticut colony militia under Major Treat, and 60 Mohegan warriors under Attawamhood from Hadley forced the indigenous war party into retreat, with the battle possibly only ending at nightfall.

== Aftermath ==
=== Combatants ===
Of the original English party, all but about 10 colonists were killed, including Lathrop. One of the survivors was the chaplain of Captain Lathrop's company, Rev. Hope Atherton. Of the 17 men from Deerfield, only one survived; eight left widows and 26 children. Nothing in the written record pertains to the killed or wounded among the indigenous forces, nor how they commemorated the battle and their dead. Indigenous losses are suggested to have been heavy as a result of their engagements with Mosely, Major Treat and Attawamhood, although this is speculation- Metacomet's forces tended to carefully conceal their losses.

The next morning, Mosely's company returned to the original battleground to bury Lathrop's men, teamsters and other casualties, where they were apparently being stripped of valuables. Muddy Brook was renamed by the English as 'Bloody Brook' as a consequence of the battle. The mass grave, located along the trail south of the brook, was confirmed by 19th-century exploration.

Lathrop's men may have been contemporaneously referred by Rev. William Hubbard as the "flower of the County of Essex" as they mirrored the demographic norm of their society, unlike other contemporary militias which leaned on recruiting criminals and men on the fringes of society. Even so, militia conscription committees such as in Rowley still universally preferred men from non-founding families of towns, and those from the 'wrong side' of religious controversy (such as being anti-Shepard).

=== King Philip's War ===
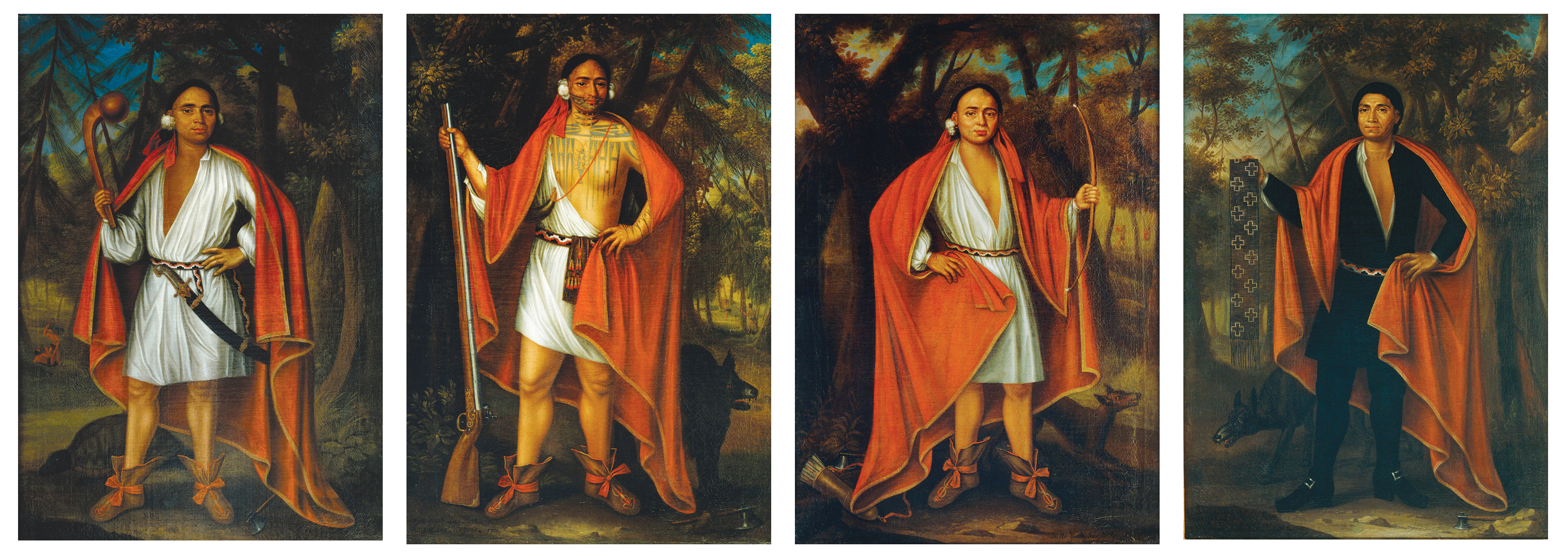
Kanienkehaka intervention undercut Metacomet's domination of the Connecticut River valley by attacking from the west, creating a yet another front in the war.

Mosely and the survivors retired to Deerfield at nightfall, where they were apparently taunted by the victorious warriors. Deerfield was fully abandoned by the English three days after the battle, with Mosely relocating his forces to garrison Hatfield, bringing with him Deerfield's garrison and inhabitants, while Major Treat's troops garrisoned Northampton and Northfield. Metacomet's forces continued their momentum by the sieging and burning Springfield to the ground, leading to the replacement of Major Pynchon by Major Appleton. In light of Bloody Brook and the Connecticut River Campaign, the subsequent Massachusetts's General Court in October 1675 committed several changes to the militia structure- converting all pikemen (1/3 of their force) to musketeers, granting autonomy to local town committees of militia, codifying the command structure & garrison soldier duties, and regulating the conduct and discipline of active duty soldiers on campaign.

Metacomet's allied forces and their families wintered in Schaghticoke, New York, where Metacomet attempted to encourage the Kanienkehaka to join the war. Fearful of further defeats, colonial forces redeployed their forces from the Connecticut River Campaign and pre-emptively struck the neutral Narragansett in the winter, culminating in the Great Swamp Fight of December 1675.

Metacomet's fortunes (particularly in the Connecticut River valley) were dashed by the Kanienkehaka, who orchestrated a surprise attack on Metacomet's camp in Schaghticoke, devastating his forces. Kanienkehaka intervention in King Philip's War continued with attacks on anti-English villages and supply lines in Massachusetts. Subsequently, Metacomet re-established his base of operations in the Connecticut River valley.

This attrition compounded the growing dissatisfaction of the Connecticut River valley nations in 1676. Although buffeted by victories such as at Sudbury, the sheer number of Narragansett & Wampanoag from both Schaghticoke and war-torn eastern New England severely strained the resources of the Pocumtuc Confederacy and the Nipmucs. Additionally, the failure of a speedy victory over the western English river towns as promised by Metacomet (typified by repulses at Northampton and Hatfield), the execution of the charismatic Narragansett sachem Canonchet, and the redeployment of English forces under Major Savage to the intensifying war in the east, led to initial negotiations with Connecticut colonial authorities. Pending negotiations and Metacomet's visit to the region in response, more indigenous communities moved to fishing spots in large numbers in order to secure their provisions, relaxing their defenses and relying on opportune moments for raiding English personnel and livestock.

This vulnerability led to the final blow for the Pocumtuc Confederacy, in the form of the 1676 Peskeompscut Massacre (present-day Riverside Archeological District). After a raid on Deerfield's fields dispersed 70 English cattle, Captain William Turner and his men launched a surprise retaliatory night attack at Pesekeompscut fishing village, killing 300 people (mostly women and children). Turner's settler army was routed when neighboring warriors attacked. The massacre was a turning point in King Philip's War, and with Metacomet's death in the same year, this led to the eventual expulsion of most indigenous people from the Connecticut River valley. These refugees would mostly evacuate to Schaghticoke, at the invitation of New York Governor Edmund Andros.

=== Further conflict ===
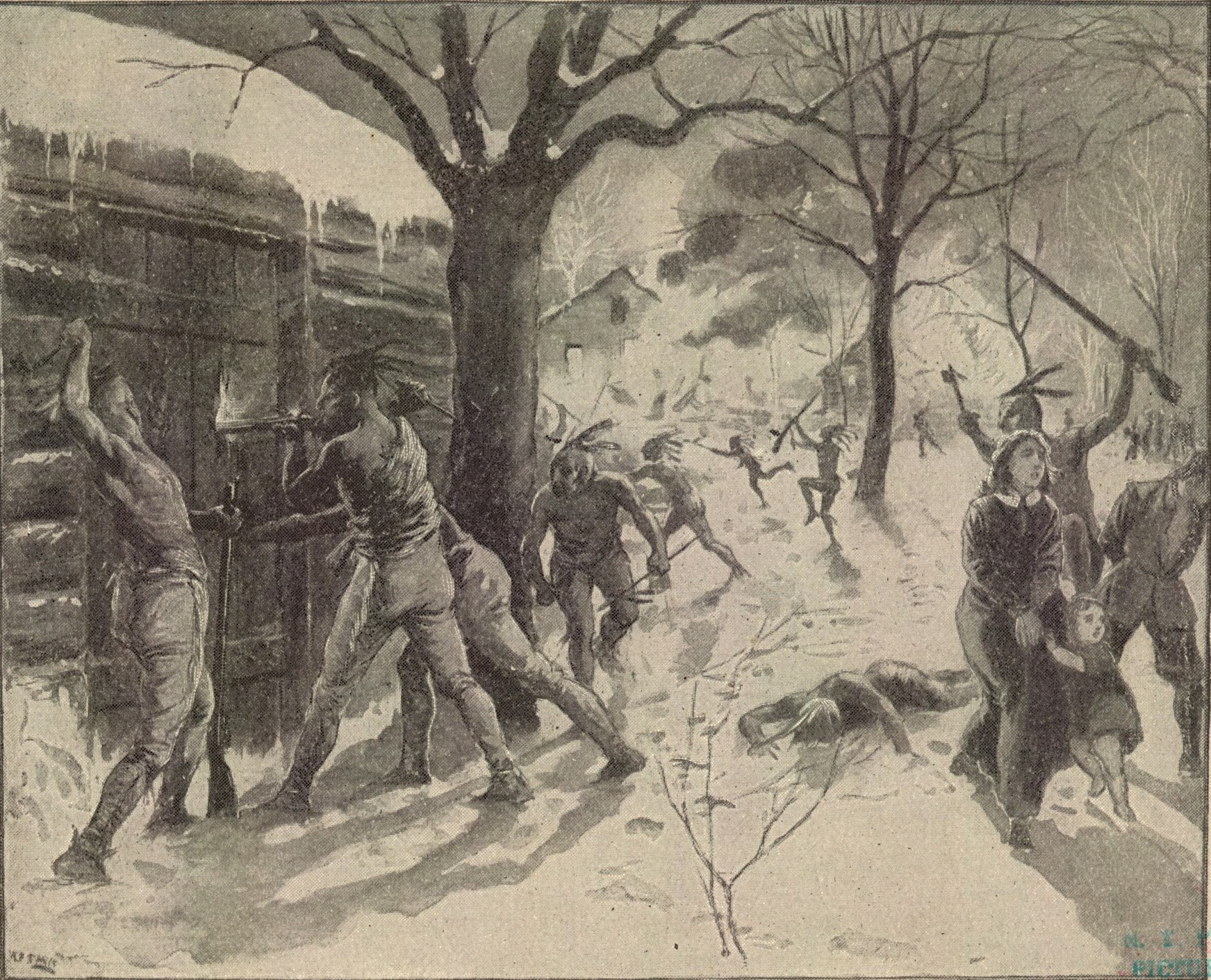
1900 illustration of the 1704 Raid on Deerfield.

Pocumtuc was resettled and officially renamed as Deerfield by the English nearly a decade later. In 1691, 150 Pocumtuc refugees returned to their homeland at the invitation of Massachusetts colonial leaders, on the condition that they avoid warfare. English settlers sought a buffer of friendly indigenous people to help guard against French & Indigenous attacks from the north. However, the Pocumtuc were subject to duplicitous deals regarding land rights and tit-for-tat extrajudicial killings, and would be forcibly expelled from their homeland by Pynchon and Deerfield's English settlers due to prejudice. This was reinforced by an indiscriminate scalp bounty introduced in 1694 targeting all unconfined indigenous people in Massachusetts, which was exploited by Pynchon.

Although dispersed, many Pocumtuc in particular joined the victorious Abenaki in the north, with many Abenaki warriors of Pocumtuc Confederacy heritage returning to raid Deerfield with allied nations in the subsequent French and Indian wars.

The most prominent of these was a coalition of Kahnawake Mohawk, Huron-Wendat, Abenaki, and French troops who sacked Deerfield in 1704 during Queen Anne's War. As part of the French and Indian wars, multiple attacks took place during King William's War (most importantly in 1694), Queen Anne's War (such as 1709), and the 1746 Siege of Fort Massachusetts/Bars Fight in King George's War. Separately, an allied coalition under Grey Lock, an Abenaki chief of Pocumtuc/Woronoco heritage, raided Deerfield in 1724 during Grey Lock's War.

== Legacy ==
=== Monuments ===
The first surviving reference to a monument dates to 1728, from a journal by Dudley Woodbridge detailing his passage between Cambridge and Deerfield. This is the earliest known reference to what is likely the oldest European-style monument to a military engagement in British North America.

The monument consisted of a tabular stone placed on a rectangular brick base. The monument was likely constructed between the 1680s and the early 1700s. By 1815, the original brick foundation Woodbridge described in his journal had disappeared completely; the table stone itself had fractured into two pieces and been moved to make room for a house. Thereafter, the table stone was transferred to the front yard of a private home, a sidewalk, and a nearby barn, until it was reset in its current location on the east side of North Main Street in South Deerfield.

The shaped, cut, and polished stone measures 37 inches (94 cm) wide, 84.5 inches (2.15 m) long, 4 inches (10 cm) thick, and was chiseled from local sandstone. Initially neither decorated nor inscribed, sometime between 1815 and 1826, the by then fractured table stone was altered and inscribed:

“Grave of Capt. Lathrop and Men Slain by the Indians, 1675.”

By 1815, an observer noted that a second monument to replace the “two rough unlettered stones, lying horizontally on the ground” had been considered, but that such efforts had been “ineffectual.” In 1835, the cornerstone for a new monument was laid in front of a 6,000 person crowd in South Deerfield, keynoted by the orator and politician Edward Everett, who stated that “[t]his great assembly bears witness to the emotions of a grateful posterity... On this sacred spot”.

The monument committee eventually succeeded in fundraising the quarrying and design of a 25 ft (7.6 m) obelisk. Overseen by Deerfield historians Epaphrus Hoyt and Stephen West Williams, the monument was dedicated on August 29, 1838, and keynoted by Deerfield Academy president Luther B. Lincoln. The monument is inscribed:

"On this Ground Capt. THOMAS LATHROP and eighty four men under his command, including eighteen teamsters from Deerfield, conveying stores

from that town to Hadley, were ambuscaded by about 700 Indians, and the Captain and seventy six men slain, September 18th 1675. (OS)

The soldiers who fell, were described by a contemporary Historian, as “a choice Company of young men, the very flower of the County of Essex none of whom were ashamed to speak with the enemy in the gate."

"And Sanguinetto tells you where the dead

Made the earth wet and turned the unwilling waters red."

"The Same of the slain is marked by a Stone slab, 21 rods southerly of this monument."

==== Interpretations ====
According to Deerfield historians Barbara Mathews and Peter A. Thomas, the contrast between the first initially uninscribed memorial and its monumental replacement reflect the transition from the early English and their Calvinist beliefs to the ideologies of neoclassical republicanism, white supremacy and patriotism in the early USA.

Gallery

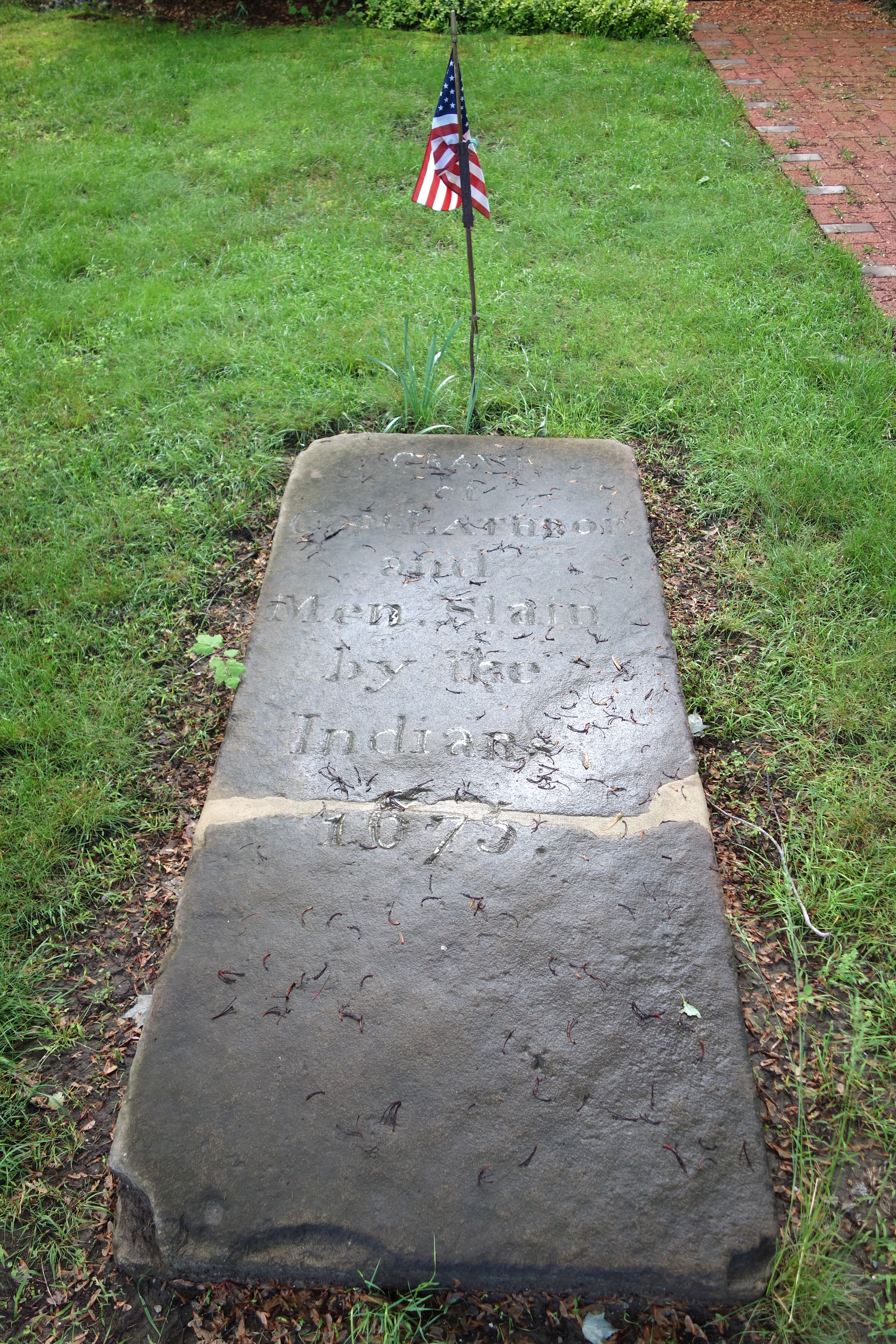
First known memorial to the Battle of Bloody Brook.

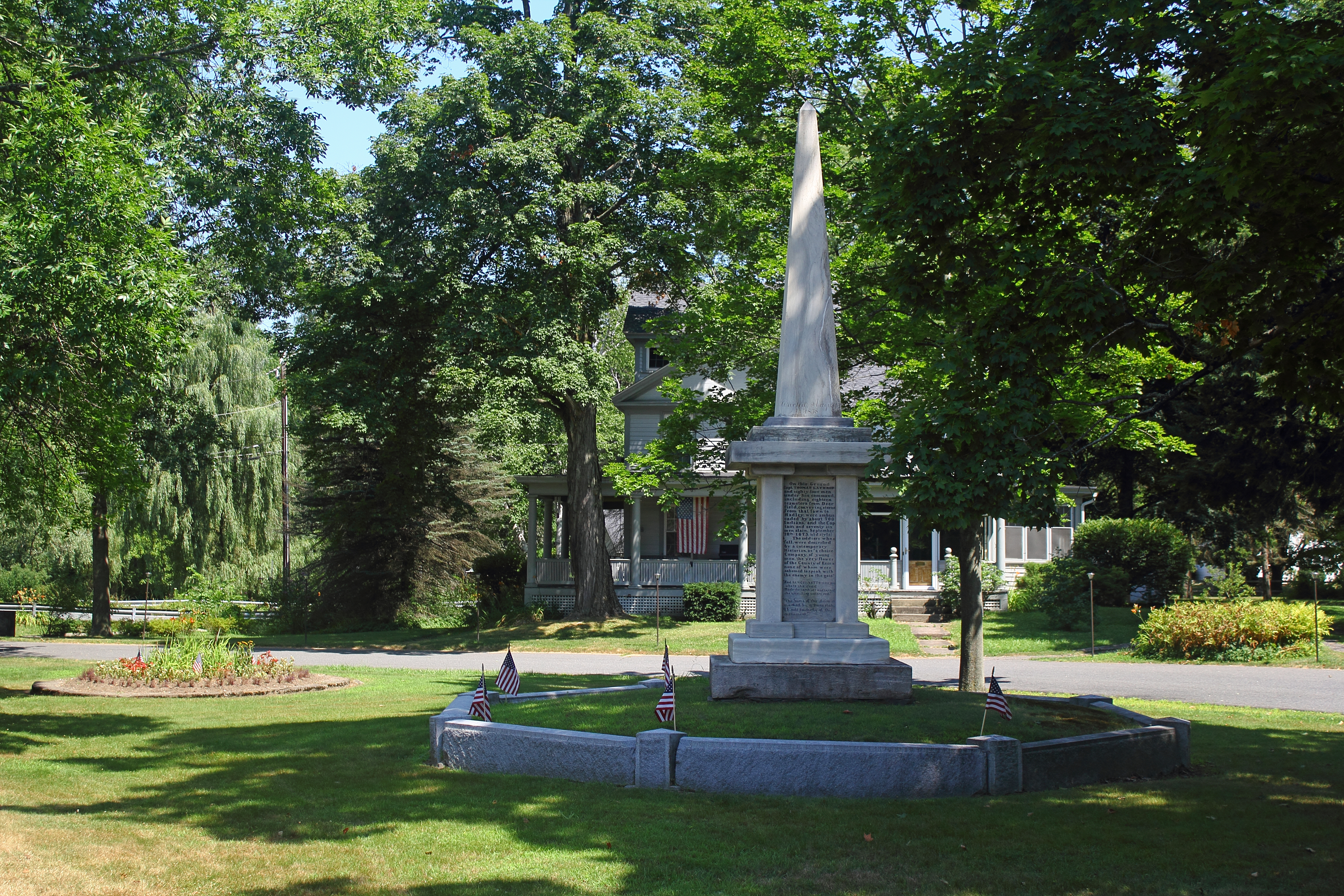
The second monument, completed in 1838.

=== Anniversaries ===
Both the 100th anniversary of the start of the American Revolution and the 200th anniversary of the Battle of Bloody Brook were in 1875. The newly formed Pocumtuck Valley Memorial Association and citizens of Deerfield organized a day long celebration, with a parade to the monument followed by carriages carrying event guests, dignitaries and local citizenry, and crowds of spectators lining the way. George Davis, President of the Day and one of the original members of the 1838 monument committee, delivered a lengthy address that emphasized an intrinsic link between King Philip’s War, the war for Independence, and the American Civil War:

There have been three great crises in the history of this country. Of two of them this is the great bi-centennial and centennial year. The first was the Indian war of 1675, known as King Philip’s war, which was a war for physical existence; the second was a war of the Revolution, which was a war for national independence; the third was the late war of the rebellion, which was a war for continued national existence.

A second speaker, George Loring of Essex County, informed the thousands listening that the Battle of Bloody Brook's significance was as “an incident in the infancy of a powerful nation, and one occurring at the critical period of the most important social and civil event known to man, the founding of a free republic on the western continent.” Recognizing that Irish, eastern European, and other relatively recent newcomers to the Valley lacked genealogical connections to this 17th-century history, Robert R. Bishop urged all to remember that the “martyred blood at Bloody Brook should inspire us to do deeds of manly, patriotic devotion.” The 300th year anniversary of Bloody Brook in 1975, according to Mathews and Thomas, reflected a significant change in peoples’ minds about the significance of the monument and the relationship with history.

The connections that had seemed so clear in 1875 between the nation’s colonial past and the significance of that past to the lives of present-day Americans were actively questioned or under attack... The Civil Rights and American Indian Movements were transforming the political and ideological landscape, in the process leading many Americans to question the triumphal historical narratives they had been taught... Some Deerfield residents did try to hold to tradition and attended a half-hour ceremony at the monument followed by a picnic lunch on the lawn of the nearby South Deerfield Congregational Church. But, as a reporter for the Amherst Record observed: “… the attraction has gone out of celebrations, in this eighth decade of the 20th Century. [Only] thirty five people, most of them crowned with gray or white hair, were on hand."

=== Historical interpretation ===
==== Early 1800s ====
Professor Margaret Bruchac argues that during the early 1800s, New England’s Euro-American citizens began embracing commemorative events, such as the anniversaries of the Battle of Bloody Brook, as platforms that served as public performances of the white ownership of history and the Connecticut River valley.

Such examples include Edward Everett's address on the 160th anniversary of the Battle of Bloody Brook in 1835, where Everett commemorated the “Indian catastrophe”. Indigenous people had been doomed to fail, he argued, since they belonged to “a different variety of the species, speaking a different tongue, suffering all the disadvantages of social and intellectual inferiority.” In particular, Everett addressed the Amherst College students and faculty in the crowd, entreating to "never forget the military struggles that had brought enlightenment and education to Deerfield".

In 1838, Luther B. Lincoln delivered another oration on the same monument site, the very place “where their fathers bled to secure to them the rich boon they possess.” Bruchac notes the dismissal of the dense evidence of indigenous horticultural industry and diplomatic relations, as well as decades of peaceful coexistence, with Lincoln instead depicting the colonial past as a place where: "every tree concealed an Indian; and every Indian’s hand grasped a bloody weapon; on every Indian’s face was pictured the curse of the white man; and in every Indian’s bosom a flame was kindled, to be extinguished only by the death of its victim."

==== Late 1800s ====
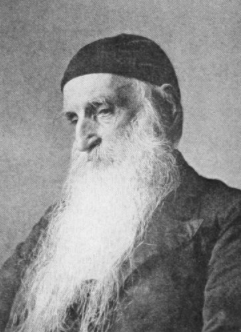
Deerfield historian George Sheldon (1818–1916).

The most prominent interpretations of Deerfield's colonial history are by the prolific Deerfield historian George Sheldon, whose works were largely written in the backdrop of the "Indian Question". Bruchac argues that Sheldon "used bloody examples from Deerfield’s history as a rhetorical device to paint the Pocumtuck Indians and, by extension, all Native people as inherently dangerous and untrustworthy. He clearly strove to retain his privileged position as an interlocutor of both Native and English history without being bothered by Indian sympathizers."

Historian Barry O'Connell notes that in Sheldon's time, there was a rise in contemporaneous missionaries and social reformers who were examining “not only about Euro-Americans’ treatment of Indians in the past but also about what was being done in the late nineteenth century.” Subsequently, Bruchac argues that Sheldon's writings were influenced by the political climate of his time, in advocating the benefits of Indigenous removal in light of Deerfield's involvement in wars with indigenous peoples.

Contemporaneously, Sheldon was accused by Josiah Temple, his co-author for the History of Northfield, of biased interpretations of indigenous history, and for excluding Dutch and Kanienkehaka testimony in the New York colonial documents, which suggested English involvement in rupturing Pocumtuc/Kanienkehaka diplomatic relations.

Despite the lengthy documentation of diverse interactions between colonial English and indigenous peoples before Bloody Brook, and the many documented visits of Pocumtuc descendants revisiting Deerfield, Sheldon in 1886 surmised Anglo-Pocumtuc history and the Connecticut River Campaign in Deerfield under the framework of the "vanishing Indian":

"A feeble remnant (after the Kanienkehaka war), renouncing their independence, sought the protection of the English . . . The enervated remains of the Pocumtuck Confederation—rebelling against English domination—appeared for a few months in Philip’s War. At its close the few miserable survivors stole away towards the setting sun and were forever lost to sight. Never again do we find in recorded history, a single page relating to the unfortunate Pocumtucks."

==== 2000s ====
In evaluating the historiography of the colonial history of the Connecticut River valley, Bruchac states:

I suggest that regional nineteenth-century historians consciously sifted the records to select historical anecdotes that emphasized Indian hostilities for dramatic impact. Their published accounts of colonial events placed white colonists at center stage and positioned indigenous people as natural antagonists and outsiders. Public renditions (monuments, speeches, historical pageantry, etc.) of this history also employed elements of nostalgia and invention. The production of history became, in this way, a method of crafting white cultural heritage by claiming the past as the collective property of non-Native settlers and their descendants. Some historians strove to minimize the influence of Native diplomacy and alliances and to downplay the intelligence of Native leaders. Others, who supported the “vanishing Indian” paradigm, tried to silence Native voices and block the potential for future Native presence by consciously crafting a definitive ending, a tragically poetic moment when all Indians in the region supposedly ceased to exist.

Modern-day Deerfield historians Mathews and Thomas (affiliated with Historic Deerfield) noted that the 350th year anniversary of the Battle of Bloody Brook would be in 2025, and emphasized the need to "actively participate in constructing nuanced, intrinsically human-centered, and relevant historical narratives" through recovering and reincorporating ancestral and contemporary Indigenous and Anglo-American perspectives.
