= Sagamore Sam =

Nashaway sachem (died 1676)

Sagamore Sam (died 1676), also known as Upchattuck, Shoshanim, and Uskattuhgun, was a sachem of the Nashaway tribe of Massachusetts. He was an active leader during King Phillip's War. Sam was a major insurgent against white settlers, acting alongside other tribal leaders such as Monoco.

== Biography ==
Sagamore Sam was from Waushacum. He was preceded as sachem by Matthew, the son of Sholan.

=== King Philip's War ===
In September 1675, Sam and Monoco led an ambush in Squakheage. Their mixed band of 150 men killed up to 20 white soldiers led by Captain Richard Beers. He would later take part in the Battle of Bloody Brook.

Sam and Monoco planned the Lancaster Raid of February 1676. The battle was fielded alongside other notable leaders including the Narragansett sachem Quinnaipin, Muttaump of the Quabaug band of Nipmuc, and likely other Nipmuc leaders such as Pakashoag and Matoonas.

Sam had captured several prisoners of war during his raids. In April 1676, Tom Nepanet arrived to negotiate the release of these captives. Although initially refused, Sam later advocated for the release of the prisoners against the advice of King Philip.

By the end of the war, Sam's own wife and children were captured by Captain Daniel Henchman and sold into slavery. Sam himself tried to surrender and asked for forgiveness, but was instead imprisoned and executed in September 1676 alongside Monoco, Matoonas, and Tantamous.
