= Hope Atherton =

American colonial clergyman

Rev. Hope Atherton (1646–1677) was a colonial clergyman. He was born in Dorchester, Massachusetts. Harvard Class of 1665. He was the minister of Hadley, Massachusetts. He served as a chaplain in the King Philips War and became separated from troops during the Battle of Great Falls in 1676. He died months after the battle, aged 30.

== Early life ==
Atherton was the tenth child of twelve and fourth son of Major General Humphrey Atherton and Mary Kennion. He was baptized on August 30, 1646, in First Church of Dorchester. He was one of the youngest of the large family whose patriarch, Humphrey Atherton, held prominent public, judicial, and military positions.

His father and members of the congregation had established first elementary school supported by public money in the New World in 1639. A school that both he and his siblings would have attended.

His father suddenly died in an accident in 1661, when he was just 15 years of age.

Some records in Harvard record his name as Sperantious; Hope in Latin.

== Teacher and clergyman ==
At the age of 22 he was recorded as the only teacher in his native town of Dorchester, at The Mather School, until he was replaced by John Foster. Atherton departed the environs of Boston and ventured westward into the Connecticut Valley, and began serving as a minister in Hatfield during the fall of 1668. However, on May 17, 1669, the people of Hatfield, formally invited him to settle there as their minister. Dorchester records, from a few weeks later, read:

At a meeting of the Towne of Dorchester orderly called together on the 8 June 1669. A motion being made by our Breatheren and freinds at or neer hadly, unto this Towne, for to dismiss Mr. Atherton from his engagement to the Schole in Dorchester, unto the publique worke of the minestry with them their, it is therefore put to a vote, whether the Towne will be willing to dismiss Mr. Atherton, from his Engagement, by the 29 Septem next, or sooner, if the towne by their Committee can provide a supply for there schole. Voted in the Affermative.

The Town of Hatfield, originally an outlying section of Hadley on the western bank of the Connecticut River, was incorporated on May 31, 1670. On August 8, at the very first town meeting, it was recorded:

"The town of Hatfield hath granted to allow Mr. Hope Atherton £60 per year, during his work in the ministry among us, provided they are free from providing him wood for his firing." Three months later, on November 25, the people of Hatfield voted to build a suitable house for their new minister and to maintain his salary at £60 per year, "two thirds to be paid in good merchantable wheat, and one third in pork," with the condition that "if our crops fall so short that we cannot pay in kind, then we are to pay in the next best we have."

The formation of the church and Atherton's ordination took place during March 1671. He was made a freeman of the town in May 1672.

=== Battle of Bloody Brook ===
The Pocomtuc tribe, allied with the Nipmuc, were aggrieved by the English colonists encroaching on their settlements. Hostilities flared in 1675 across Massachusetts. This was the era of King Philip's War and Mohawk incursions eastwards. The Battle of Bloody Brook was fought on September 18, 1675, between colonial militia from the Massachusetts Bay Colony and Native Americans led by the Nipmuc sachem Muttawmp, during King Philip's War.

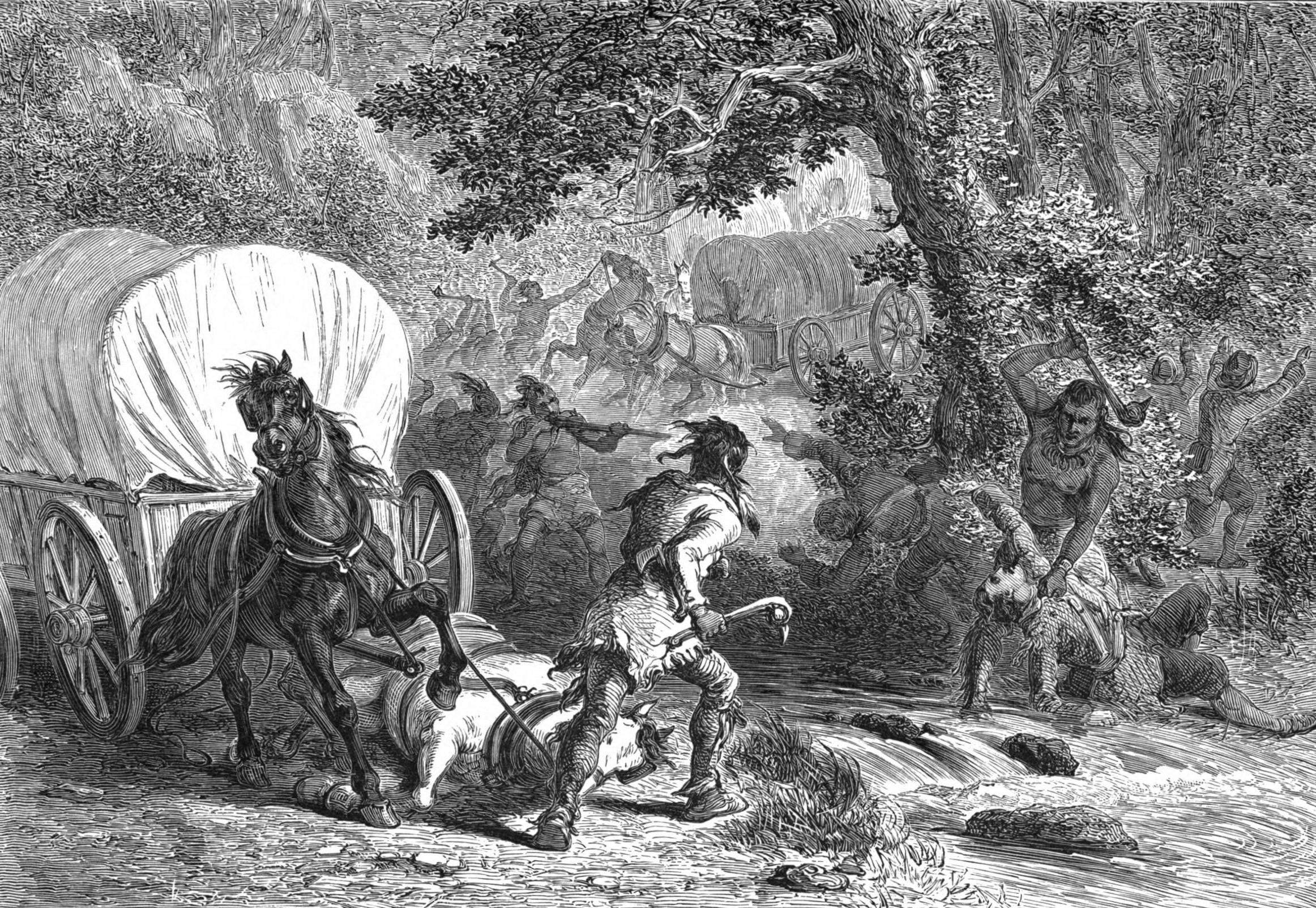
Battle of Bloody Brook in 1675. Some sources claim Hope Atherton was present

Atherton, was allegedly the chosen chaplain of Captain Lathrop's company, a militia who escorted colonists traveling in loaded wagons, transporting the harvest from Deerfield to Hadley. A large contingent of reportedly 700 Native Americans ambushed the group, resulting in the death of 40 militia men and 17 teamsters, out of a company that included 79 militia. Only 10 colonists survived the attack, solely due to the quick intervention of another militia group in Deerfield who heard the gunshots, led by Major Treat of Hadley and Captain Mosely of Deerfield. The Genealogical and Historical Memoir of the Otis Family cited above, and that of the Hollister Family of America, may have confused this battle with Turner Falls, since no other source has yet to tie Atherton to being a survivor of Bloody Brook. It is unclear whether he accompanied Lathrop’s militia on that fateful day.

=== Battle of Turner's Falls ===
The spring of 1676 saw several skirmishes between garrisoned troops in the Connecticut valley and Native American tribes of the region. Towns were attacked as far south as Windsor, CT and as far north as Deerfield, Massachusetts, where his cousin Rev.Samuel Mather (Independent minister) had been a minister. During the month of March the Northampton stockade was breached and Atherton's town of Hatfield was now threatened. By early May, between seventy and eighty cattle were stolen from the new settlers, from fields north of Hatfield by a group of Native Americans who then encamped to celebrate and feast at Peskeompskut, later called Turners Falls, Massachusetts.

On May 18, 1676, a force of 141 men, gathered at Hatfield for a march northward under Capt. William Turner to attack the Native American encampment north of Deerfield, Massachusetts. Alternative sources say they left the previous day. Atherton accompanied the expedition as its chaplain. After an all-night march, the English militia and volunteer settlers achieved their goal of surprise and at daybreak of the 19th attacked and massacred scores of Native Americans; some warriors but mostly women and children. However the sound of the falls masked the arrival of a much larger group of warriors and a counter attack commenced, with the militia losing 42 men, including Capt. Turner.

Atherton was among a half a dozen who were separated from the main body during the chaotic retreat. This event would be marked in history as the Battle of Turner's Falls; however it is also referred to as the Peskeompscut massacre.

Atherton eventually found his own way back to Hadley. However many of the settlers were highly skeptical of the exceptional experiences he recalled, especially in regard to the Native Americans fleeing upon his attempted surrender and the mystery of how he crossed the Connecticut River to eventually stumble into Hadley.

Contemporary historians refer to this event as the Battle of Great Falls, instead of attributing the event solely to Captain William Turner.

=== Atherton's sermon ===
Compelled to respond to those who doubted his story of wandering in the wilderness, near starvation and trying to evade capture, Atherton shared his experiences in a sermon, which he delivered in the Hatfield church on May 28, 1676:

Hope Atherton desires this Congregation and all people that shall hear of the Lord's dealings with him, to praise and give thanks to God for a series of remarkable deliverances wrought for him. The passages of divine providence (being considered together) make up a complete temporal salvation.

I have passed through the Valley of the Shadow of Death, and both the rod and staff of God delivered me. A particular relation of extreme sufferings that I have undergone, & signal escapes that the Lord hath made way for, I make openly, that glory may be given to him, for his works that have been wonderful in themselves, and marvellous in mine eyes; and will be so in the hearts of all whose hearts are prepared to believe what I shall relate. On the morning (May 19, 1676) that followed the night in which I went out against the enemy with others, I was in eminent danger through an instrument of death; a gun was discharged against me at a small distance; the Lord diverted the bullet so that no harm was done me. When I was separated from the army, none pursued after me, as if God had given the heathen a charge, saying, let him alone, he shall have his life for a prey. The night following I wandered up and down among the dwelling places of our enemies; but none of them espied me. Sleep fell upon their eyes and slumbering upon their eyelids. Their dogs moved not their tongues. The next day I was encompassed with enemies, unto whom I tendered myself a captive. The Providence of God seemed to require me so to do. No way appeared to escape, and I had been a long time without food. They accepted not the tender which I made; when I spake they answered not. When I moved toward them, they moved away from me. I expected they would have laid hands upon me, but they did not. Understanding that this seems strange and incredible to some, I have considered whether I was not deceived; and after consideration of all things, I cannot find sufficient grounds to alter my thoughts. If any have reason to judge otherwise than myself, who am less than the least in the Kingdom of God. I desire them to intimate what their reason is. When I have mused, that which hath cast my thoughts according to the report I first made is, that it tends to the glory of God in no small measure; if it were so as I believe it was, that I was encompassed with cruel and unmerciful enemies, and they were restrained by the hand of God from doing the least injury to me. This evidenceth that the Most High ruleth in the kingdom of men, & doeth whatsoever pleaseth him among them. Enemies cannot do what they will, but are subservient to overruling providence of God. God always can and sometimes doth set bounds unto the wrath of man. On the same day, which was the last day of the week, not long before the sun did set, I declared with submission that I would go to the Indian habitations. I spake such language as I thought they understood. Accordingly I endeavored; but God whose thoughts were higher than my thoughts, prevented me by his good providence. I was carried beside the path I intended to walk in & brought to the sides of the great river, which was a good guide unto me. The most observable passage of providence was on the Sabbath day morning. Having entered upon a plain, I saw two or three spies, who I (at first) thought had a glance upon me. Wherefore I turned aside and lay down. They climbed up into a tree to spy. Then my soul begged of God that he would put it into their hearts to go away. I waited patiently and it was not long ere they went away. Then I took that course which I thought best according to the wisdom that God had given me.

Two things I must not pass over that are matters of thanksgiving unto God; the first is that when my strength was far spent, I passed through deep waters and they overflowed me not according to those gracious words of Isa. 43:2; the second is, that I subsisted the space of three days & part of a fourth without ordinary food. I thought upon those words 'Man liveth not by bread alone but by every word that proceedeth out of the mouth of the Lord.' I think not too much to say that should you & I be silent & not set forth the praises of God through Jesus Christ that the stones and beams of our houses would sing hallelujah. I am not conscious to myself that I have exceeded in speech. If I have spoken beyond what is convenient I know it not. I leave these lines as an orphan, and shall rejoice to hear that it finds foster Fathers & Mothers. However it fare amongst men, yet if it find acceptance with God, thro' Christ Jesus I shall have cause to be abundantly satisfied. God's providence hath been so wonderful toward me, not because I have more wisdom than others (Danl. 2: 30) nor because I am more righteous than others; but because it so pleased God.

— H. A. Hatfield, May 24, 1676.

Atherton was not alone; Jonathan Wells, a 16-year-old boy, also part of the expedition, was left bed-ridden for a full year and by his own account it took him up to four years to fully recover from the battle and its aftermath.

Atherton's health never fully recovered from the exposure he suffered while lost in the woods. and he died June 8, 1677, at age 30.

Hatfield was without minister from the death of Atherton in 1677, until the call of Rev. Nathaniel Chauncey, father of Nathaniel Chauncey, was accepted in 1683. The poverty brought by the King Philips War meant that a settlement of £40 for his widow Sarah was not released until 1679; three years after his death.

== Personal ==
Atherton married Sarah Hollister (1646–1691), the daughter of John Hollister and Joanna Treat from Wethersfield, Connecticut, in 1674. They had three children:

- Hope Atherton, born on January 7, 1675, in Hatfield, Massachusetts. Died in infancy.
- Joseph Atherton, born January 7, 1675, in Hatfield, Massachusetts. The surviving twin. He settled in Deerfield and became a selectmen there in 1715. He died in Gill, Massachusetts, on October 13, 1753, aged 78
- Sarah (Atherton) Parsons, born October 26, 1676, in Hatfield, Massachusetts

He was buried at Hill Cemetery, Hatfield, Hampshire County, Massachusetts. There is no gravestone or marker.

His widow, Sarah, married Lieutenant Timothy Baker of Northampton and with her two children, Joseph and Sarah moved to live with him. Sarah became the mother of 7 more children; Timothy, John, Edward, Grace, Prudence, Deliverance; and of the much celebrated Captain Thomas Baker, who married Christine Otis, who had been captured by Native Americans as a child. Captain Baker's war record mentions the release of English civilians including the Otis family. Sarah Baker, Atherton's wife, died December 8, 1691, in Northfield, Hampshire County, Massachusetts.

== Legacy ==
His son Joseph Atherton was involved in the historical recording of his father's involvement in 1717.

Some sixty years after the Battle of Turner’s Falls, a grant was made by the General Court of a township of land, in e vicinity of where the event had taken place. The list of the survivors and the descendants who were then entitled to receive apportionment of a total of 6 mi^{2} included his only son to reach adulthood, Joseph Atherton. The township is now known as Bernardston.

Atherton has been referred to as "Hopestill", instead of "Hope" in the Suffolk County Probate Records.

Adelbert S. Atherton is a notable descendant.

== See also ==
- Angel of Hadley
- Battle of Bloody Brook
- Battle of Turner's Falls
- Increase Mather
- Wheeler's Surprise
