= Thomas Wheeler (soldier) =

English-born colonial militia officer (1620–1676)

- Born: c. 1620; England
- Died: December 10, 1676 (aged 55–56); Concord, Massachusetts Bay Colony, English America
- Occupations: Merchant; landowner; militia officer
- Military career
- Branch: Massachusetts National Guard
- Service years: 1669–1676
- Rank: Lieutenant
- Conflicts: King Philip's War

Thomas Wheeler (c. 1620 – December 10, 1676) was an English-born colonial merchant, landowner, and milita officer in the Massachusetts Bay Colony. In 1675 he took part in King Philip's War; later he wrote a memoir based on his experiences.

== Biography ==
He emigrated from England to the North American colonies in 1642. In 1644 he was living in Fairfield, Connecticut. In the 1650s Wheeler was a trader; in 1657 he purchased the right to trade with the Native American tribes for twenty five pounds. Around 1661 he was one of the first people to purchase land in the Ockocangansett plantation, which later became the town of Middleborough, Massachusetts. He was made a lieutenant on October 12, 1669 and a captain in 1671.

In 1675 he took part in King Philip's War against the Wampanoag and Nipmuck tribes. At the beginning of the hostilities he was assigned as military escort to Cpt. Edward Hutchinson and together with him, led his men into an ambush, carried out by the Nipmucks under Muttawmp and Matoonas, at Brookfield, Massachusetts, that has become known as Wheeler's Surprise. His horse was shot out from under him and he was seriously wounded, but eventually survived the battle. His son, also named Thomas Wheeler was also wounded, in the loins and arm, but also managed to survive. Thomas Wheeler (senior) eventually wrote an account of the engagement which was first published in 1676 by Samuel Green, under the title "A Thankfulle Remembrence of Gods Mercy. To several Persons at Quabaug or BROOKFIELD". Wheeler's work exemplifies the Puritan conception of heroism, in which a person's piety is their virtue while the credit for the victory in battle is ascribed to God.

He died in 1676 due to complications from the wounds received at the battle of Brookfield.
