= Tom Nepanet =

Christian Nipmuc who took part in King Philip's War

Tom Nepanet (fl. 1676), also known as Tom Doublet, was a Christian Nipmuc who took part in King Philip's War. In April 1676, he began working as an emissary between Nipmuc leadership and Massachusetts colonists.

Nepanet was imprisoned on Deer Island, but was respected as an interpreter for the English. The Council of Massachusetts, urged by Daniel Gookin and the family of Mary Rowlandson, sent Nepanet with a letter to King Philip and Sagamore Sam to negotiate the freedom of captives. By May, many of the captives had been released. That month, Nepanet assisted Captain Daniel Henchman with an ambush outside of Lancaster, Massachusetts.

Nepanet married Wunnuhhew, known as Sarah Doublet. He was her third husband. After their release, the two returned to Nashoba. Wunnuhhew outlived Nepanet.
