= Quaboag =

Indigenous people of Massachusetts, US

Total population
- <600

Regions with significant populations
- United States (Massachusetts)

The Quaboag were an Algonquian-speaking people, one of the most widespread of Indian linguistic stocks, closely related to the Nipmuc, Nashaway, and other local tribes—collectively known to colonists as the “Fresh Water Indians” or “Nipnets” Their territory centered around the Quaboag Pond and Quaboag River, encompassing present-day Brookfield, New Braintree, Warren, Brimfield, and Sturbridge, Massachusetts.

== Social organization and economics ==
The Quaboag people lived in seasonal villages or bands, utilizing the Quaboag river and lake resources for fishing, hunting, and agriculture (e.g., corn, squash, beans). Trade and movement along native paths linked them with other tribes and, later, European settlements.

== Relations with colonists ==
The Quaboag tribe established relations with colonists from as early as the 1630s. Settlers, for example William Pynchon, traded and purchased land from the Quaboag, facilitating relatively peaceful coexistence early on. In 1660, the Quaboag Plantation was established (now Brookfield) which was named after the tribe.

== King Philip’s War (1675–76) ==
As part of the Nipmuc confederation, the Quaboag joined Metacom (King Philip) in rebellion against colonial encroachment. Led by sachem Muttawmp, they participated in major skirmishes, including the infamous Brookfield ambush (“Wheeler’s Surprise”), where settlers were attacked in August 1675. Colonial retaliation forced many Quaboag into exile, death, or assimilation into other tribes or Christian "praying towns".

== War aftermath and legacy ==
After the war, the resulting displacement led to the Quaboag being dissolved as a distinct political entity; survivors merged with Nipmuc groups or fled to Canada. The name lives on in local geography: Quaboag Pond, River, and institutions like Quaboag Regional Middle/High School.
