= Sudbury Fight =

Battle during King Philip's War

- Part of King Philip's War
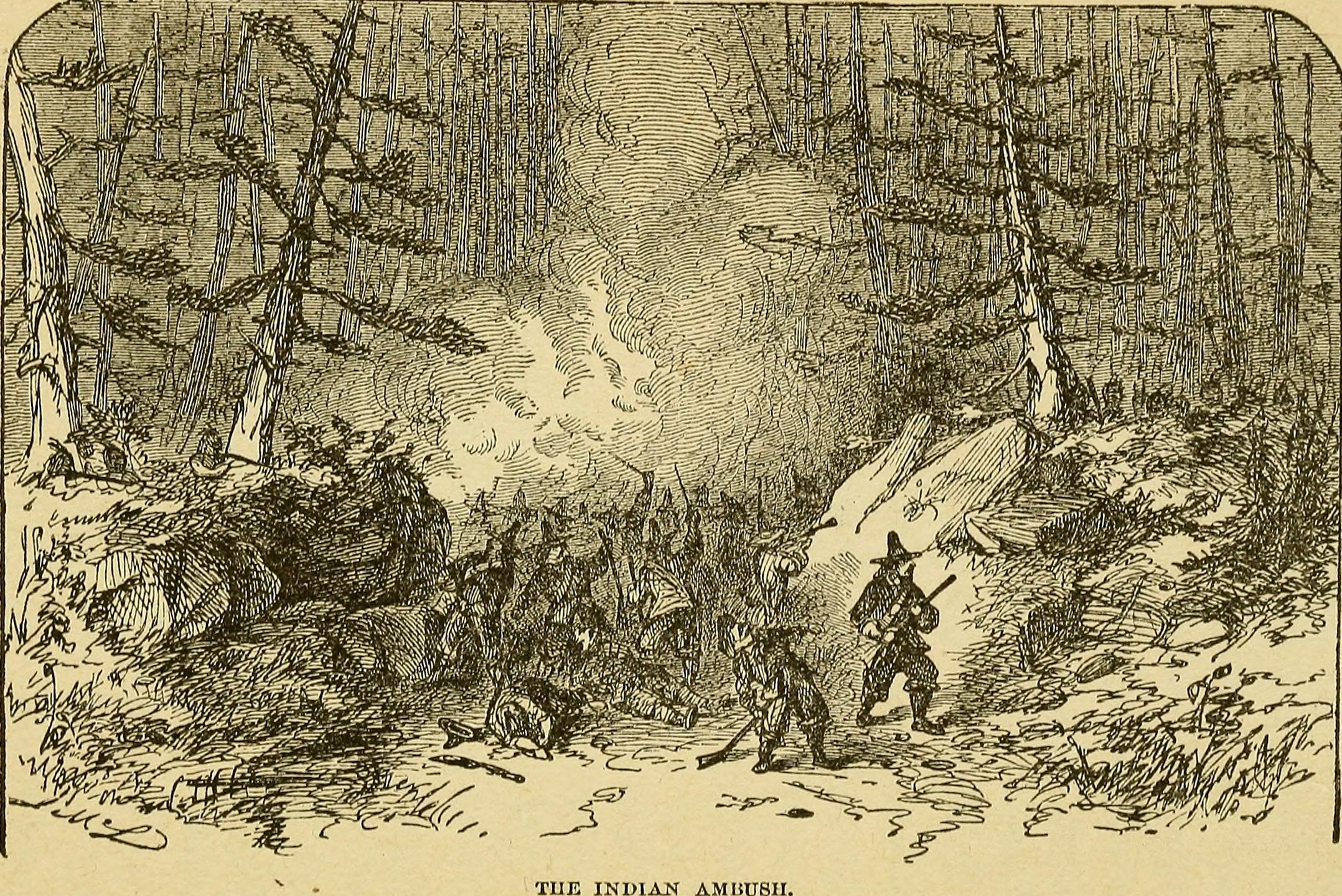
- An artist's rendition of the ambush of Wadsworth's men
Date	April 21, 1676
Location	Sudbury, Massachusetts
Result	Native American victory

Belligerents
Massachusetts Bay	Wampanoag; Nipmuc; Narragansett

Commanders and leaders
Samuel Wadsworth †; Samuel Brocklebank †; Hugh Mason; Edward Cowell; John Sharp †; Solomon Phipps	Possibly Metacomet or Muttawmp (see Background)

Strength
120 infantry 40 cavalry 80 civilian volunteers	500

Casualties and losses
74	120

The Sudbury Fight (April 21, 1676) was a battle of King Philip's War, fought in what is today Sudbury and Wayland, Massachusetts, when approximately five hundred Wampanoag, Nipmuc, and Narragansett Native Americans raided the frontier settlement of Sudbury in Massachusetts Bay Colony. Disparate companies of English militiamen from nearby settlements marched to the town's defense, two of which were drawn into Native ambushes and suffered heavy losses. The battle was the last major Native American victory in King Philip's War before their final defeat in southern New England in August 1676.

== Background ==
The winter of 1676 brought a lull in the fighting of King Philip's War in eastern Massachusetts, but come spring Native American forces resumed their raids on the area's Puritan towns. The Native coalition attacked the strategically significant fort at Marlborough, Massachusetts on both March 16 and April 7, destroying most of the settlement and forcing a partial evacuation of its residents. In response to these attacks, as well as the recent abandonment of Lancaster and Groton, the colonial Council of War dispatched Captain Samuel Wadsworth and fifty men to Marlborough to reinforce the frontier. Wadsworth's company passed through Sudbury on the evening of April 20.

Meanwhile, a large group of Native warriors departed the Nipmuc stronghold of Mount Wachusett and gathered on Pompositticut Hill (also known as Summer Hill in what is now Maynard, Massachusetts). After a pow wow, the group decided to attack Sudbury instead of Concord. Tradition holds that Metacomet led the Native army at the Sudbury Fight, though no primary sources corroborate it. Local historians have suggested that Nipmuc sachem Muttawmp held overall command.

== Battle ==
Native forces infiltrated Sudbury during the night and attacked at dawn, burning houses and barns, as well as killing "several persons," according to Puritan historian William Hubbard. Many English residents of Sudbury (most of whom lived on the east bank of the Sudbury River, in present-day Wayland) abandoned their homes and sought refuge in the town's fortified garrison houses. The Natives besieged the Haynes garrison house on Water Row Road all morning but faced a stout defense from the English civilians within. At one point the Natives rolled a flaming cart full of flax downhill toward the garrison, only for the contraption to hit a rock and spill over before doing any damage. The Haynes garrison held throughout the battle, though authors George Ellis and John Morris have speculated that the siege was a feint meant to draw English reinforcements to the area.

"Hearing the alarm," about a dozen men of Concord marched to Sudbury's defense. They were ambushed and massacred within full view of the defenders of the Haynes garrison. Only one of the Concord men escaped with his life, and the dead were buried in a mass grave just east of Old Town Bridge in Wayland.

Flushed with victory, Native forces crossed the river and set about pillaging the central settlement of Sudbury. Shortly before noon, English militiamen from Watertown under the command of Captain Hugh Mason arrived and successfully repelled the raiding party.

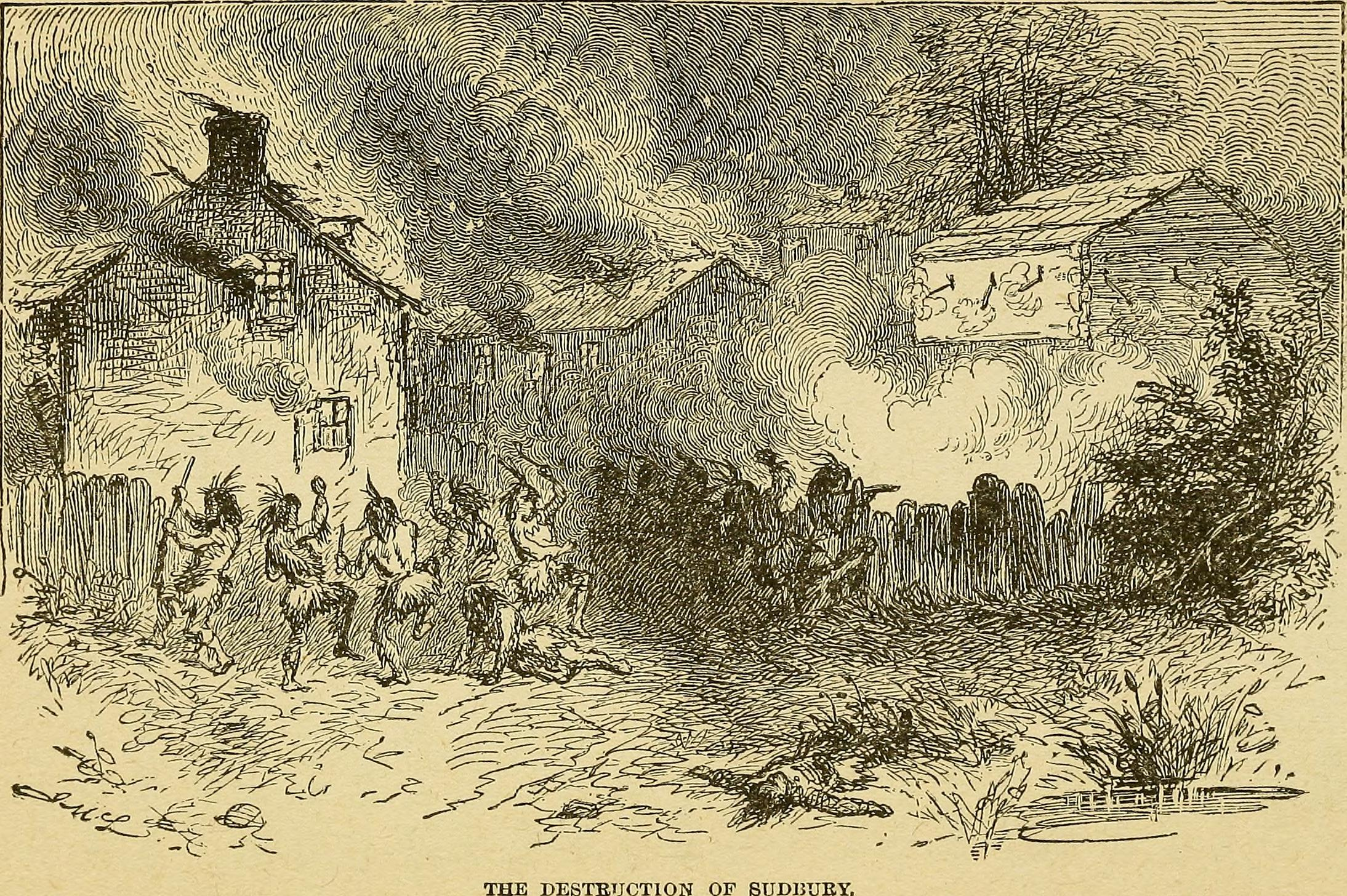
A depiction of the attack on the town

As Mason took back control of the town, Captain Wadsworth approached from the west with about seventy men, his numbers bolstered by Captain Samuel Brocklebank's garrison at Marlborough. Wadsworth's men had rested only briefly in Marlborough before their march back east to defend Sudbury; they were hungry, exhausted, and completely ignorant of their enemy's position. A mile from town, Wadsworth's men spotted about a hundred armed Natives darting off into the woods. Believing that "these they might easily deal with," the militia set off in pursuit.

The Natives led the militia to the low ground between Goodman's Hill and Green Hill in present-day Sudbury, where they sprang an ambush, surrounding the small English force. Wadsworth fought his way to the summit of Green Hill, ordering his men to form a square, and repulsed multiple Native charges. The fighting went on all afternoon. The Watertown militia and two companies of English cavalry repeatedly attempted to rescue Wadsworth, but ultimately failed to break the Native envelopment and were forced to retreat.

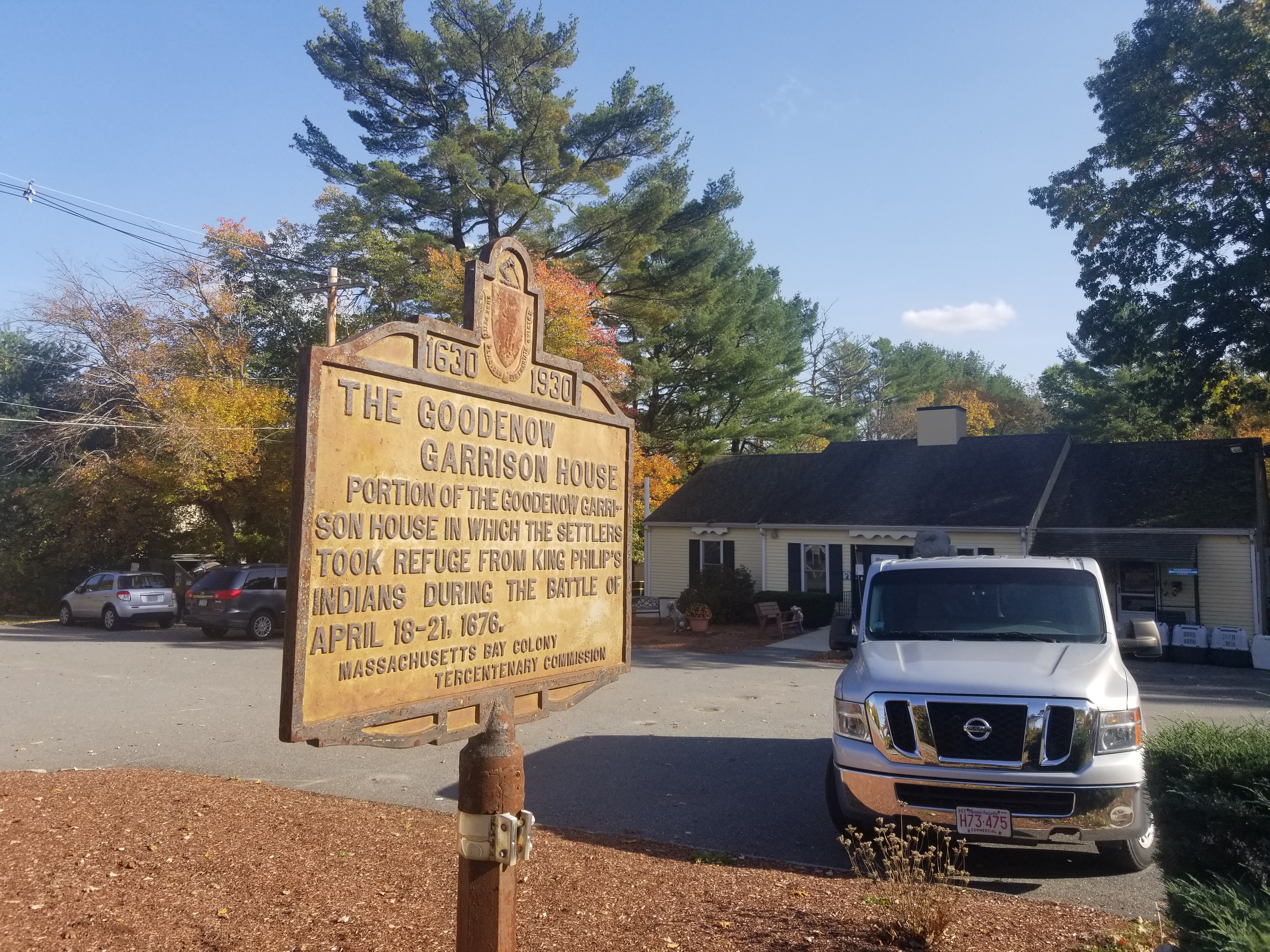
Goodenow Garrison House site in Sudbury

Native warriors then set fire to the dry brush of the hill, choking Wadsworth's beleaguered company with smoke. In a panic, the English broke and ran. Half the militiamen were killed in the rout, including Wadsworth and Brocklebank. The survivors fled south toward the Goodenow garrison house on Boston Post Road, where Mason's company and the cavalry were regrouping. Thirteen or fourteen militiamen also took refuge in the fortified Noyes grist mill until they were eventually rescued.

According to Increase Mather, the Natives took "five or six of the English alive" and "stripped them naked, and caused them to run the gauntlet, whipping them after a cruel and bloody manner, and then threw hot ashes upon them; cut the flesh of their legs, and put fire into their wounds, delighting to see the miserable torments of wretched creatures. Thus are they the perfect children of the Devil." Hubbard also claims English captives were tortured, but Mary Rowlandson, a captive of the sachem Weetamoo who was present in the Native camp during the battle, makes no mention of it in her memoirs.

== Aftermath ==
As night fell, Native forces withdrew from Sudbury. Early the next day, English soldiers, together with a group of allied Praying Indians, set out to the battlefield to bury the dead.

Rowlandson claims that despite their victory, morale among the Native coalition was low after the Sudbury Fight:

"They came home without that rejoicing and triumphing over their victory which they were wont to show at other times; but rather like dogs (as they say) which have lost their ears. Yet I could not perceive that it was for their own loss of men. They said they had not lost above five or six; and I missed none, except in one wigwam. When they went, they acted as if the Devil had told them that they should gain the victory; and now they acted as if the Devil had told them they should have a fall. Whither it were so or no, I cannot tell, but so it proved, for quickly they began to fall, and so held on that summer, till they came to utter ruin."

Hubbard and Mather disagree with Rowlandson, putting the Native dead at a "hundred and twenty," and in the autumn of 1676, prominent citizens of Sudbury recounted that they had made a "considerable slaughter" of Native attackers. On the morning of April 22, Native warriors taunted militiamen in Marlborough by shouting seventy-four times to indicate the number of their enemy they believed they had killed at Sudbury.

== Legacy ==
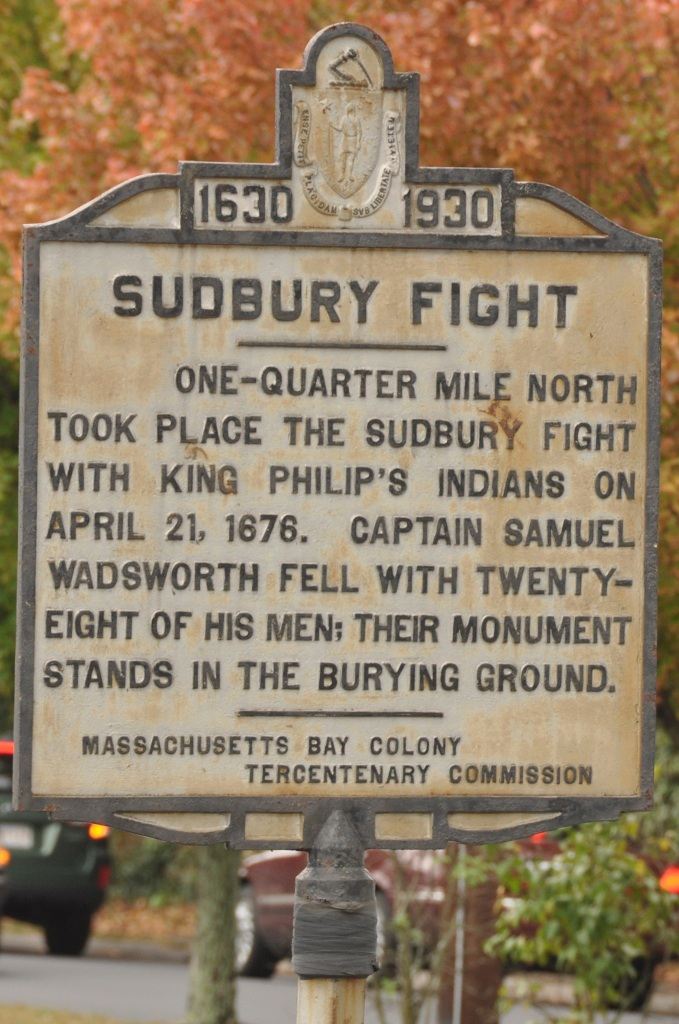
Marker commemorating the battle

In 1730, Samuel Wadsworth's son Benjamin (then president of Harvard College) dedicated a memorial stone over the mass grave where his father had been buried alongside his men. In 1852, the remains of Wadsworth's militia were excavated and reinterred fifty feet north to the site of a new monument near the base of Green Hill.

Both memorials incorrectly date the battle to April 18, likely an error of Hubbard's that was subsequently reprinted. The date is April 21 in Mather's contemporary chronicle, and a letter dated April 21, 1676 from the colonial government of Massachusetts Bay to Plymouth Colony governor Josiah Winslow states, "This day we have intelligence in the general that Sudbury was this morning assaulted and many houses burnt down."

A handful of other monuments and markers in Sudbury and Wayland commemorate the Sudbury Fight, most of which were erected in the 1930s to celebrate Massachusetts's tricentennial. The battlefield around Goodman's Hill and Green Hill is now the site of an affluent residential neighborhood.

The battle is a major plot point in the 2023 horror film The Sudbury Devil.
