= Norwottuck =

Coordinates: 42.34°N 72.60°W

Norwottuck is the Algonquian name for an area that is now Northampton and Hadley, Massachusetts. It is also used to refer to the Algonquian people who once lived there, who were part of the Pocumtuck Confederacy. Early English documents also refer to the area and people by the orthographic variants Norwootuc, Nonotuck, and Nolwotogg, the latter being the best representation of the local dialect.

== Villages associated with the Norwottuck ==
White (1903) claims that the territory of the Norwottuck extended "from the 'Great Falls' at South Hadley to Mt Sugarloaf.

== Interactions with European colonists ==
Colonists cite a deed of land signed by three Norwottucks: Umpanchla alias Womscom, Quonquont alias Wompshaw, and Chickwalopp alias Wowahillowa in selling land to John Pynchon (son of William Pynchon). Although the Norwottuck may have resided in the area until around 1700, their presence often went unrecorded.

== Toponymy ==
Many local geographical and other features are named for the Norwottuck. The name Mount Norwottuck was given to a mountain previously known as Hilliard Knob in 1841 by Edward Hitchcock.

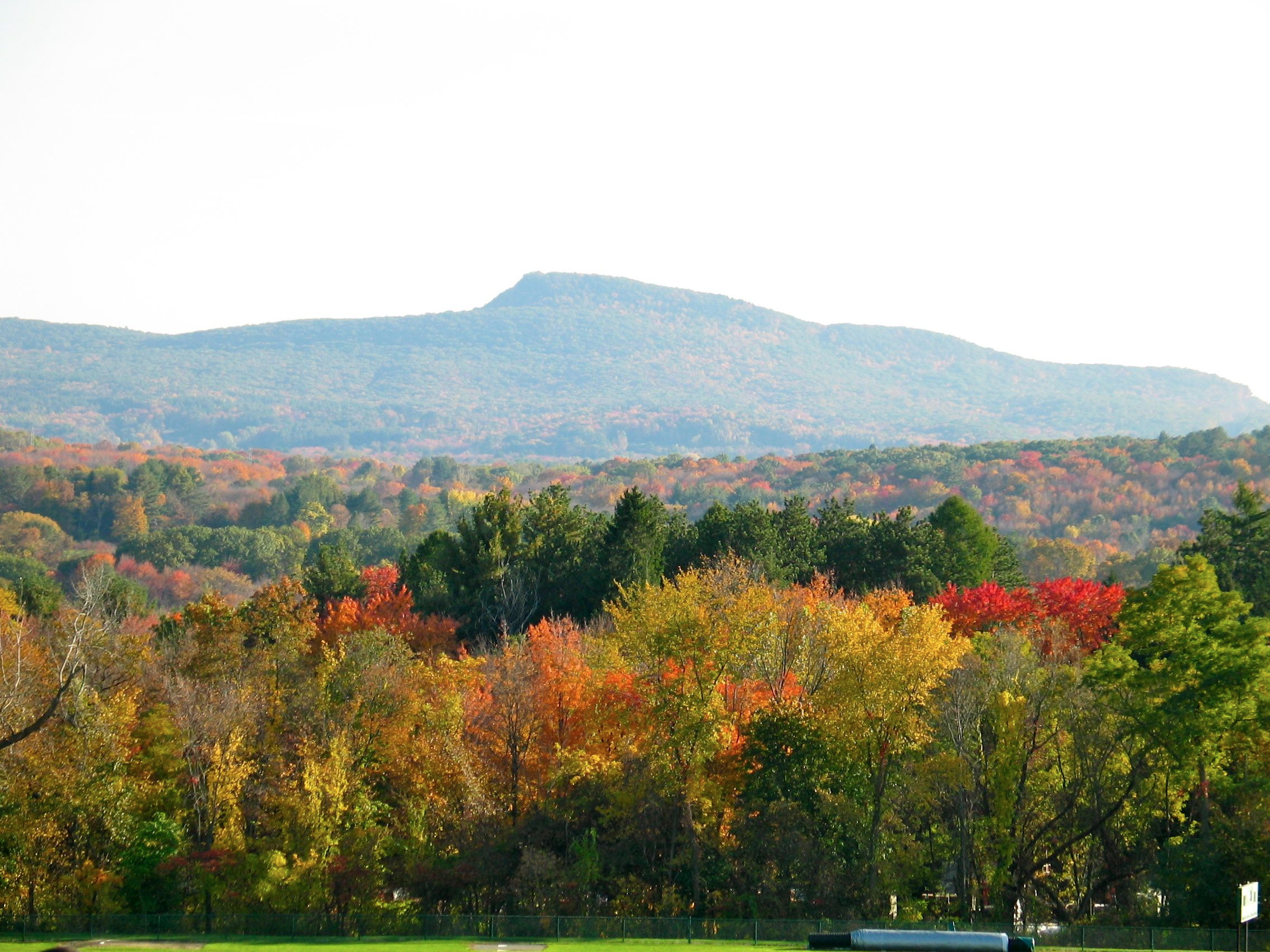
Mount Norwottuck is named for the Norwottuck.

The Norwottuck Rail Trail is likewise named after the people.
