= Pocomtuc =

Extinct Native American tribe from Massachusetts

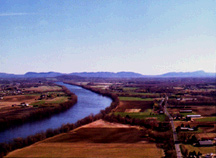
- Central Connecticut River Valley, historically the main area of Pocomtuc settlement.

Total population
- Extinct as a tribe

Regions with significant populations
- United States (Massachusetts)

Languages
- an Eastern Algonquian language

Religion
- Indigenous religion

Related ethnic groups
- Other Algonquian peoples

The Pocomtuc (also Pocomtuck, Pocumtuc, Pocumtuck, or Deerfield Indians) were a Native American tribe historically inhabiting western areas of Massachusetts.

== Settlements ==
Their territory was concentrated around the confluence of the Deerfield and Connecticut Rivers in today's Franklin County. Their homelands also included much of current-day Hampden and Hampshire Counties, plus areas now in northern Connecticut and southern Vermont. This area is roughly coterminous with the modern Pocumtuck Valley.

Their principal village, also known as Pocumtuck, was in the vicinity of the present day village of Deerfield, Massachusetts.

== Language ==
Their language, now extinct, was an R-dialect of the Algonquian language family, most likely related to the Wappinger and nearby Mahican tribes of the Hudson River Valley.

== Subsistence ==
The Pocumtuc people likely led lifestyles similar to neighboring tribes in New England. They would have engaged in semi-sedentary agriculture of maize, beans, and squash. They also hunted game and fished in the Connecticut River, which served as a major inland transportation route.

Archaeological and documentary evidence both testify to the fact that the Pocumtuc were skilled at maize horticulture. The fertile open meadows around present-day Deerfield were cleared and planted with corn, and dozens of short-term food storage pits pocked the surface of the glacial outcropping called Pine Hill.

== History ==
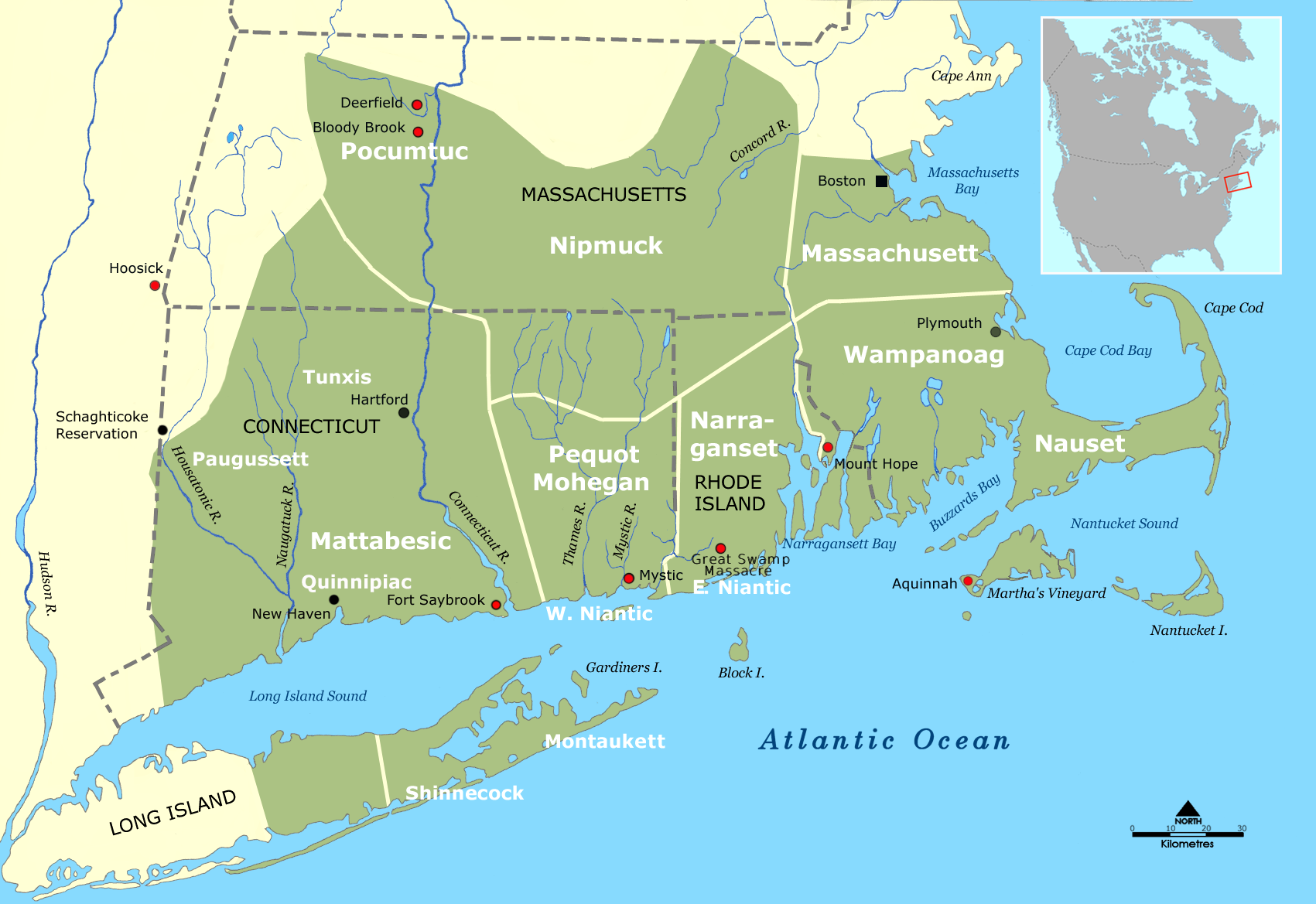
Territories of the Pocumtuc and neighboring tribes

The Pocumtuck were decimated by smallpox epidemics after European contact. They had no immunity to the new disease and suffered high fatalities. In addition, they lost tribal members due to taking part in wars among the Dutch, English, French, and their respective Native American allies.

The Pocumtuck were originally allied with the Tunxis and Narragansett against Chief Uncas of the Mohegan and the Pequot. All these tribes united against the English colonists with the Wampanoag Confederacy in King Philip's War.

At the close of the war, many Pocumtuck, Nipmuc, and other tribes fled to Schaghticoke, a village on the Hudson River. They remained there until the outbreak of the Seven Years' War in 1754, when most joined and merged into the Abenaki tribes at Saint-François-du-Lac, Quebec or moved further west.

Among the members of the Pocumtuck tribe was Chief Wawanotewat (1670–ca. 1750), better known as Gray Lock. A famous warrior, he led Abenaki bands into Massachusetts after most of his followers had left the state. There is a tradition that states that Mount Greylock in the Berkshires is named for him, (or that it was named for the grey clouds that surround the peak during the winter).

As of the late 1990s, it is believed that modern-day decedents of the Waranoke reside in the Saint Francis Abenaki reserve in Quebec, Canada.

== Villages associated with the Pocumtuck ==
- Agawam - present-day Metro Center Springfield, Massachusetts. The adjacent, present-day city of Agawam, Massachusetts is named after this village (sometimes associated with the Nipmuc)
- Mayawaug - present-day West Suffield, Connecticut
- Nameroke - present-day Enfield, Connecticut
- Nonotuck - present-day Northampton, Massachusetts / Easthampton, Massachusetts
- Norwottuck - present-day Hadley, Massachusetts
- Pachasock - present-day Westfield, Massachusetts / West Springfield, Massachusetts
- Peskeompscut - present-day Turners Falls, Massachusetts
- Pocumtuck - present-day Deerfield, Massachusetts
- Scitico - present-day Enfield, Connecticut (farther east)
- Squakeag - present-day Northfield, Massachusetts (primary town of the Sokoki)
- Woronoco, Waranoke or Waranoak - present-day Russell, Massachusetts or colonial Westfield, Massachusetts

== In popular culture ==
The Pocumtucks are mentioned in the H. P. Lovecraft novella The Dunwich Horror as the presumed builders of the stone circles in the hills around Dunwich.

The Pocumtuc are mentioned in the novel “North Woods” by Daniel Mason, which takes place in the historical homeland of the Pocumtuc people, which is now known as Western Massachusetts.

“Here Pocumtuc men and women cultivated fields along the river floodplain.”

P. 348, “North Woods” by Daniel Mason

== See also ==
- Native American tribes in Massachusetts
