= Muttawmp =

Sachem of the Nipmuc

Muttawmp (died September, 1676) was a sachem of the Nipmuc Indians in the mid-17th century, originally based in Quaboag. He participated in King Philip's War, taking part in most of the major engagements as one of the most important chiefs who fought for Metacomet (King Philip).

Muttawmp had converted to Christianity and become a Praying Indian. However, Metacomet began organizing the local tribes so that they could attack the colonists, and Muttawmp foreswore Christianity and joined him, together with Nipmuc sachem Matoonas. He led the successful attack on Brookfield in which Edward Hutchinson was mortally wounded, son of the controversial Anne Hutchinson.

Muttawmp was also the Nipmuc leader in the Battle of Bloody Brook on September 12, 1675 near South Deerfield, Massachusetts, in which 51 colonial soldiers and 17 colonial teamsters were killed, including Captain Thomas Lathrop. The name of the place was changed from "Moody Brook" to "Bloody Brook" because the stream near the battlefield turned red with blood. In October, 1675, Muttawmp surrounded Hatfield, Massachusetts with 800 men and tried to draw the colonists out by setting fires outside of town. However, the militia within the town resisted the temptation to come out in force and only sent out a 10-man party to investigate, nine of whom were killed or captured by the Nipmucs. On April 21, 1676, he and 500 warriors routed civilians in an Attack on Sudbury, Massachusetts. Muttawmp finally tried to make peace with the colonists through Richard Waldron, but he was executed in September 1676 along with Old Jethro and others.

== Works cited ==
- Eric B. Schultz and Michael J. Tougias, "King Philip's War. The History and Legacy of America's Forgotten Conflict", Countryman Press, 1999
- Russell Bourne, "The Red King's rebellion: racial politics in New England, 1675-1678", Oxford University Press US, 1991,
- Leo Bonfanti, "Biographies and legends of the New England Indians: Volume 3 ", Pride Publications, 1972
