= Matoonas =

Executed Nipmuc man (died 1676)

Matoonas (? - died 1676 in Boston) (also spelled Matonas) was a sachem of the Nipmuc Indians in the middle of 17th century. He played a significant role in the Native American uprising known as King Philip's War.

== Early life ==
Matoonas had originally converted to Christianity and became a Praying Indian. He was even made a constable by the colonists of the Praying Indian village of Pakachoog. However, in 1671 his son was accused of murdering an Englishman named Zachariah Smith near the Neponset River in Dedham, and hanged, despite the fact that it was widely known that somebody else was responsible for the crime. After the execution the head of Matoonas' son was placed on display as a warning. Consequently Matoonas was very bitter towards the English although he kept his true feelings hidden until a suitable opportunity would present itself. When Metacom (King Philip) began organizing an armed movement against the English settlers in New England in 1675, Matoonas willingly joined and convinced other Nipmuc sachems to follow him. In July of that year he led a raid on the town of Mendon, which decided Nipmuc participation in the war on the side of Philip. Mendon was the first colonial settlement in the Massachusetts Bay Colony to be attacked during King Philip's War.

Shortly after the raid on Mendon, together with another Nipmuc sachem, Muttawmp, Matoonas successfully ambushed a party of colonial soldiers in what became known as Wheeler's Surprise at Brookfield.

== Execution ==
Matoonas was betrayed and turned over to the English in Boston in autumn 1676 by another Nipmuc sachem. Most colonial sources list the name of the one who gave betrayed him as "Sagamore John," or "Chief John". In 1677 Rev. Thomas Cobbett wrote an account of the War stating that "Capt. John Jerthoag a Nipmuk Sagamor came in and some with him, and presently after fetched in old Matonas and his son, 120 more, which I think was before the thanksgiving day," and "Jerthoag" has been interpreted by Drake as meaning, "Jethro," possibly a family member of Nipmuc leaders Peter Jethro and Old Jethro. Some sources give the original Native American name of this person as Horowaninit, Schultz and Tougias state in their work on the King Philip's War however, that "...Muttawmp and Shoshonin, who had delivered Matoonas to the English, likewise fell victim to Waldron's treachery and were executed by firing squad at Boston." Matoonas' betrayer either volunteered to execute him personally, or was forced to do so by the colonists, in order to demonstrate his loyalty to the English. Sagamore John was sold into slavery. Matoonas' head, like his son's before him, was presented on a pole outside of Boston as a way to terrorize other Indians who supported King Philip.

== Works cited ==
- Eric B. Schultz, Michael J. Tougias, "King Philip's War. The History and Legacy of America's Forgotten Conflict", Countryman Press, 1999.
- Leo Bonfanti, "Biographies and Legends of the New England Indians", New England Historical Series, Pride Publications, 1981.
- Samuel Gardner Drake, "The book of the Indians, or, Biography and history of the Indians of North America, from its first discovery to the year 1841", Benjamin B. Mussey, 1845.
- Richard W. Cogley, "John Eliot's mission to the Indians before King Philip's War", Harvard University Press, 1999.
- "New England Historical and Genealogical Register, Volume XXII", David Clapp & Sons, 1868.
