= Rebecca Kellogg Ashley =

English woman, captive of Native Americans

Rebecca Kellogg Ashley (December 22, 1695 – August 1757), known as Wausaunia among the Mohawk, was a child living in the Province of Massachusetts Bay, captured by allied French, Canadian militia, Haudenosaunee, and Algonquin soldiers in the 1704 Deerfield Raid. The Deerfield attack was part of the decade-long Queen Anne's War (the 1702-1713 War of Spanish Succession on the Continent). Rebecca was eight years old when she was taken to Kahnawake with her sister Joanna across the Saint Lawrence River. Eunice Williams was captured in this same raid, as was her father, John Williams who wrote about his captive experience in The Redeemed Captive. Like Eunice and several other children from Deerfield, Rebecca Kellogg was adopted by Haudenosaunee Mohawks in the town of Kahnawake. She married and raised children in the Mohawk Community but later remarried Ben Ashley.

Unlike Eunice, Rebecca Kellogg returned to British colonial territory as an older woman. She married Ben Ashley, and she translated for several Congregational missionaries in Indian missions, including Jonathan Edwards at the Stockbridge Indian Mission. Edwards expressed his admiration for her faith and interpretation skills in many letters. Although she had left Kahnawake, she often lived with the Haudenosaunee and identified as a member of the Mohawk. Rebecca Kellogg Ashley is notable for being an interpreter of early eighteenth-century borderlands and a hybrid individual who mediated cultural exchange on the borderlands.

== Early life ==
Rebecca Kellogg Ashley was born on December 22nd, 1695, to a prominent family in the Connecticut River Valley, the Kellogg's. The Deerfield attack in 1704 was painted by its large scale, the number of hostages taken, and the record of the events. Rebecca Ashley, her sister Joanna, her father, and two older brothers were all taken to Mohawk-controlled Kahnawake. Ashley's father was ransomed quickly and returned back home. Rebecca's seventeen-year-old brother Martin escaped with three other young boys after less than one year. Rebecca's twelve-year-old brother Joseph stayed imprisoned in the same settlement with Rebecca and Johanna until after the war. The Haudenosaunee valued the adults for ransom value, while the children taken during these raids and attacks were seen for potential familial and cultural value in Indian communities. Captives were adopted into families who had lost their own to war. During the transport of captives, the children were kept safe and warm from the elements and hardships of travel. Rebecca and her sister were not met with violence but tenderness, allowing the transition into Mohawk life to be easier. While adults were transported to Quebec or Montreal, Rebecca and Johanna were taken to the Mohawk community of Kahnawake, where they were both adopted by the same family.

Rebecca was introduced into her new family through a "requicking" ritual, which restored balance to the family and ended the mourning for the other family members. Rebecca was given the name of Wausaunia, meaning bridge, connection, or tie. Rebecca lived an agrarian lifestyle, learning to speak Mohawk and French while retaining her ability to speak English. This is likely possible due to Joanna and Rebecca being able to communicate with one another in English consistently within their new home. After the War ended, neither Rebecca nor Joanna immediately came home. This is because both girls were married since they were both twenty years old, and most women in Mohawk society married at fourteen or fifteen years old. Joanna had married the chief of the Caughnawaga, while the identity of Rebecca's husband remains unknown. Both sisters had born children, and the powerful Kellogg family likely would have rejected mixed-raced children coming into the community. Rebecca Kellogg Ashley eventually returned to Massachusetts in 1729 after negotiating her way back into the English settlement.

It is likely when Rebecca Kellogg Ashley came back to the English Settlement in 1729 that, she came with her two sons but without her husband, who presumably died in battle. Due to Rebecca being the sole provider of two sons, the oldest son potentially being seventeen years old, ransomed money for her two sons. Both of her sons returned to Mohawk territory and likely joined their Aunt Joanna. In her later travels, Rebecca had likely traveled several times north to Kahnawake to see her children and grandchildren.

== Adult Life ==
Rebecca Kellogg Ashley married Ben Ashley in 1745. The marriage between Ben Ashley and Rebecca Ashley was made to allow the Church Union to hire Ben Ashley when Rebecca was required for translation work. Rebecca Kellogg Ashley retained work for Missionaries trying to Christianize Native Americans from 1745 until her death in 1757. Rebecca began work with Elihu Spencer and Job Strong, who was hired by The Society for Propagation of the Gospel in New England, or known as the New England Company, for missionary work. In 1748, Rebecca Ashley went with both Spencer and Strong as their interpreter in the country of the Oneidas. The use of Rebecca's translating ability to the Native people allowed for a larger congregation within the church. Larger Church's gave money to their mission due to the success and size of the mixed congregation, which was credited to Rebecca's involvement. The controversy of Rebecca Ashley's career did come from her work with Spencer and Strong. They claimed that she was unreliable in her translation, but scholars later deduced this 'unreliability' was due to Rebecca's ability to translate simultaneously with the preacher's speech.

Jonathan Edwards began his work in 1751 in Stockbridge, Massachusetts. The New England Company tasked Edwards to preach to both Native Americans and white churches to strengthen the relationship with the Mohawks. There was tension at the time in Stockbridge due to white families claiming farmland set aside for Native Americans involved within the church. Rebecca Ashley was requested to be the translator for Edwards due to her ability to draw Mohawks to the church. However, Martin Kellogg did not want his sister to be involved with the mission. Captain Martin Kellogg, Rebecca's older brother, ran the boys' boarding school, where he angered the Mohawks. Martin Kellogg preferred to use Mohican and Mohawk schoolboys as cheap day laborers rather than teaching English and Christian catechism. Jonathan Edwards believed in treating the young boys with Kindness, while Martin Kellogg did not. Quickly, the management of the school was changed, and Rebecca Kellogg was brought to Stockbridge to work as a translator.

Rebecca Kellogg Ashley was revered by the Mohawks, who viewed her as a part of their community. Johnathan Edward explained that the Mohawks had "long shown themselves very jealous of Mr. Ashley and his wife, that they are not well treated by those that have the management of things, and have very publicly complained of it". Jealous, in this sense, meant devoted, fond, and zealous for the well-being of something. Rebecca Ashley was so valued in the community as a tie between the Mohawks and the white settlers that Johnathan Edwards believed if she left to go back into Haudenosaunee country, it would cause the entire community to fall apart. In the Spring of 1753, Gideon Hawley came to Stockbridge to handle the school and continue the work of Johnathan Edwards, who left the mission. Hawley additionally used Rebecca Kellogg Ashley as his translator. The French and Indian War began years later, in 1756. The Haudenosaunee warned Hawley that he must leave the Indian territory, while they warned Rebecca Ashley to continue farther into the Indian Territory to keep her safe. Rebecca Kellogg Ashley died only a few months later in the same community she stayed within the native American territory in 1757.

== Legacy ==
In 1757, Rebecca Kellogg Ashley died and was buried in a cemetery in Onaquaga, where she died. In the 1900s, her remains were moved to a safer location, and in 1909, the Daughters of the American Revolution created a large headstone on a boulder in her memory. The inscription upon the headstone reads, In memory of 'Wausaunia" Rebecca Kellogg Ashley. Rebecca Kellogg Ashley left an impact on the mixing of Native American society and Christian communities. Rebeca Kellogg Ashley did not write any journals herself. However, she was well documented through the writings of the Christian Missionaries with whom she worked. Rebecca Ashley additionally viewed herself and was viewed as a member of the Mohawks. This allowed her to navigate and mend the borderland's troubled relationship between settlers and the Haudenosaunee. Rebecca navigated several different communities, cultures, and identities and later worked within the Christian Church and their mission to combine Native society and the church.
