= Gamaliel Smethurst =

Canadian politician

Gamaliel Smethurst (April 9, 1738 – July 20, 1826) was a New England Planter who wrote one of the rare captivity narratives from Nova Scotia and eventually became a politician in Nova Scotia. He represented Cumberland County in the Legislative Assembly of Nova Scotia from 1765 to 1770.

He was born in Marblehead, Massachusetts, the son of Captain Joseph Smethurst and Tabitha Skinner. In 1761, Smethurst travelled to Chaleur Bay to trade with the French and natives under a license from the military governor of Quebec, James Murray. Smethurst was abandoned by a captain in the employ of Roderick Mackenzie, and so was forced to make his way to Fort Cumberland in the month of November, without food or shelter. Smethurst returned to Marblehead by way of Halifax but, in 1763, received a land grant in Cumberland County. He served as customs comptroller and deputy surveyor of woods. Not long after his term in the Nova Scotia assembly, he moved to London, England.

In 1774, he published A narrative of an extraordinary escape: out of the hands of the Indians, in the Gulph of St. Lawrence, describing his earlier voyage to Chaleur Bay.

== See also ==
- Captivity Narratives - Nova Scotia
