= Mercy Harbison =

Mary Jane Harbison (March 18, 1770 – December 9, 1837) was a young American woman living in the decades immediately following the Revolutionary War. She was captured by Native Americans in May 1792. Massy escaped after six days and gave a deposition, Capture and Escape of Mercy Harbison, 1792, which is an example of the American literary genre of captivity narratives.

== Early years ==
Mary Jane "Massy" White was born on March 18, 1770, in Amwell, New Jersey, the daughter of Edward White, a soldier during the Revolutionary War, and Rebecca Pelton, a descendant of Richard More (Mayflower passenger).

== Career ==
She married John Harbison in 1787 in Pennsylvania. He was born in Belfast, Ireland, the son of Matthew Harbison Jr. and Margaret "Peg" Carson.

In November 1791, she lived in western Pennsylvania on the Allegheny River above Pittsburgh with three small children. Her husband accompanied General Arthur St. Clair to defeat at the Battle of the Wabash, otherwise known as St. Clair's Defeat and St. Clair's Shame. After the Native American victory, tribes on the frontier increased their attacks on European-American settlements. Harbison's husband was scouting in late May 1792 when the Harbison home was attacked.

Harbison and her three children were captured. The natives killed and scalped her three-year-old child. Her five-year-old son was killed shortly after. She managed to escape after several days, evading re-capture for six days with minimal access to food. Carrying her infant, she navigated barefoot back to Fort Pitt. The deposition of her experiences was given before the magistrates in Pittsburgh.

She and John later separated. John died in 1822 when he was lost at sea; and she died in 1837.
