= Margaretta Faugères =

American poet

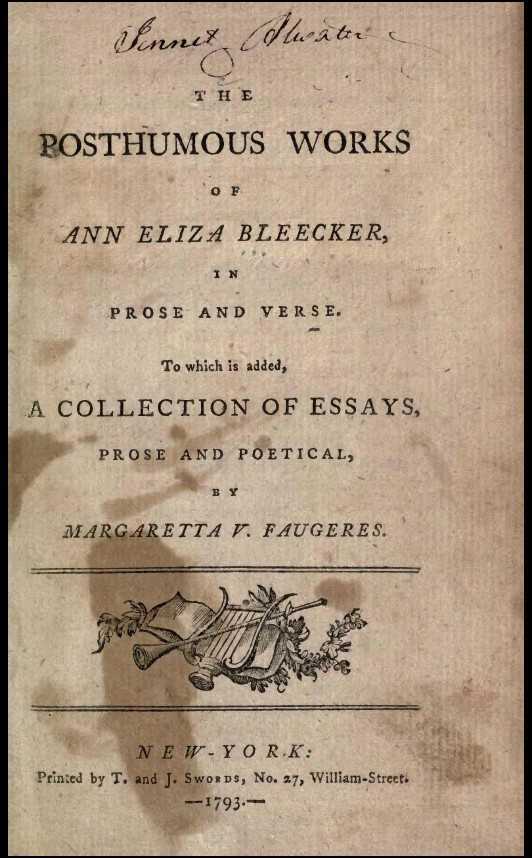
- Born: Margaretta V. Bleecker; October 11, 1771; New York City
- Died: January 9, 1801 (aged 29); Brooklyn
- Occupations: Author and political activist

Margaretta Faugères (October 11, 1771 – January 9, 1801), daughter of Ann Eliza Bleecker, was an American playwright, poet, and political activist. Following the American Revolutionary War, she gained recognition in New York City's elite social circles for her talents and education. However, her marriage was troubled due to her husband's reckless behavior. After his death in 1798, she worked at a women's academy in New Brunswick, New Jersey. Accounts suggest that the difficulties she endured throughout her life took a significant emotional toll, and she died at the age of 29.

== Early life and education ==
Margaretta V. Bleecker was born in New York City to John and Ann Eliza Bleecker, members of the city's Dutch-American aristocracy. Shortly after her birth, the family moved to their country estate in Tomhannock, a small village north of Albany, where they lived in the "most perfect tranquility" until the outbreak of the American Revolution. Her mother was a prolific writer and encouraged her to write, too. During the war, Faugères lost her grandmother, aunt, and sister. Her mother was devastated by the loss and never fully recovered. Faugères described their life after the war as "tolerable tranquility". Her mother developed a tendency towards depression and destroyed most of her own writings. Faugères' tragedy continued with the loss of her mother when she was twelve years old.

Sometime after her mother's death, she and her father moved to New York City, where she continued her education and began to write.

== Career ==
Faugères was committed to establishing her mother's reputation as a writer, as well as her own. She began publishing her own essays and poems and what was left of her mother's poetry in The New York Magazine in 1790. Her reputation as a poet grew, and for a few years, she was considered the "premier poet" of the magazine. She had strong political views and concentrated her writings on the anti-slavery movement, her support of the French Revolution, and her disapproval of capital punishment.

In June 1791, The New York Magazine published Faugères essay Fine Feelings Exemplified in the Conduct of a Negro Slave, in which she challenged Thomas Jefferson's claim that slaves lacked "finer feelings". She wrote,

I cannot help thinking that their sensations, mental and external, are as acute as those of the people whose skin may be of a different colour; such an assertion may be bold, but facts are stubborn things, and had I not them to support me, it is probable I should not attempt to oppose the opinions of such an eminent reasoner.

Her support of the French Revolution was likely shaped by her friendship with a French physician, Peter Faugères, who shared her political views. In opposition to her father's wishes, they married on Bastille Day (July 14, 1792). Her marriage proved to be miserable; it became widely known that her husband abused her, and within a few years, he squandered her large fortune. In 1793, she published The Posthumous Works of Ann Eliza Bleecker in Prose and Verse, to which is added a Collection of Essays, Prose and Poetical, a collection of her and her mother's work. In 1795, she wrote Belisarius: A Tragedy. It was her major literary achievement, a blank-verse tragedy in four acts that echoed her views on human rights.

Faugères opposed the death penalty for murder, which made her view more radical than most. She felt it was inconsistent for a country that boasted of its freedom and happiness. She wrote The Ghost of John Young in 1797. It was a six-page pamphlet arguing against the use of capital punishment. It was a poetic narrative in which she gave John Young's perspective from the grave.

Yes, I a murderer was by rage propell'd; and I have heard the last harsh decree,
but if the maniac is a murderer held, say cool deliberate actors, what are ye?

Not much is known of the remainder of her life. Her husband died of yellow fever in 1798. She taught school at an academy in New Brunswick, New Jersey, and later in Brooklyn. Her last published work, "Ode", was composed to support a July 4, 1798, speech given by Governor George Clinton, of whom she was a longtime supporter. The text was written to remind those of the price of revolution and the need for change. Faugeres saw beyond her privileged class and wrote about the democratic ideals of equality and justice. She sought radical change for American society and politics.

== Personal life ==
Margaretta Van Wyck Bleecker and Dr Pierre (also known as Peter) Faugères had two daughters, Eveanna Electra Faugères (1795–1841) and Margaret Mason Faugères (1797–1820). Eveanna married her mother's half-brother John Anthony Bleecker (1791-1873) and had 8 children. Margaret married Edward P. Brady and was married 5 years before her death. She died on January 9, 1801, in Brooklyn and is buried next to her father in the Bowery Methodist Church cemetery.
