= Ann Eliza Bleecker =

American poet, correspondent (1752–1783)

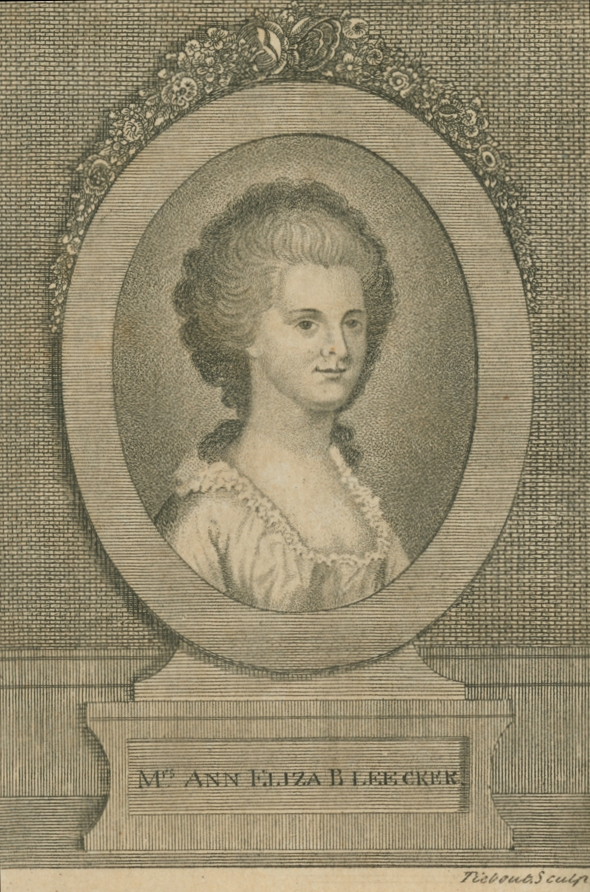
- Engraving from frontispiece of Posthumous Works, published 1793
- Born: Ann Eliza Schuyler; October 1752; Albany, New York
- Died: November 23, 1783 (aged 31); Albany, New York
- Spouse: John James Bleecker
- Writing career
- Genres: Pastoral poetry, captivity narrative
- Notable work: The History of Maria Kittle

Ann Eliza Bleecker (October 1752 – November 23, 1783) was an American poet and correspondent. Following a New York upbringing, Bleecker married John James Bleecker, a New Rochelle lawyer, in 1769. He encouraged her writings, and helped her publish a periodical containing her works.

The American Revolution saw John join the New York Militia, while Ann fled with their two daughters. She continued to write, and what remained of the family returned to Tomhannock following Burgoyne's surrender. She was saddened and affected by the deaths of numerous family members over the years, and died in 1783.

Bleecker's pastoral poetry is studied by historians to gain perspective of life on the front lines of the revolution, and her novel Maria Kittle, the first known Captivity novel, set the form for subsequent Indian Capture novels which saw great popularity after her death.

== Childhood ==
Ann Eliza Schuyler was born in October 1752, in Albany in the Province of New York. She was the sixth child born to Margareta Van Wyck and Brandt Schuyler, successful merchants and members of the American Dutch aristocracy. After a long illness, Ann Schuyler's father died just before she was born in 1752. As a child, Ann Schuyler was known for her precocious writing ability, and was often asked to recite her poems, which ranged from sentimental or humorous to sophisticated or satirical. She would often compose impromptu poems at the request of friends. Ann's mother remarried in 1760; she and her new husband Anthony TenEyck (1712–1775) had one daughter, Susanna TenEyck (1762-?). The TenEycks were also part of the Dutch elite, so Ann Schuyler's childhood seemed to be filled with security, abundance and happiness.

== Marriage to John James Bleecker ==
On March 29, 1769, Ann Schuyler married a lawyer from New Rochelle, John James Bleecker (1745–95). The couple moved to Poughkeepsie shortly after their marriage. John gave up the practice of law and took up agriculture in 1771, when they moved to his pastoral country estate in Tomhannock, eighteen miles (29 km) north of Albany, in the Schaghticoke region which was settled by Dutch families. "The Bleecker home reflected their wealth by its furnishings and its setting." "From the beautiful gardens flourishing with beauty, to the young orchard bounded by a thick forest...to the west, vast cultivated fields and the roaring river of Tomhhanock." Bleecker considered her home a "retreat" and most of her pastoral poetry was written in the first five years of her life in Tomhhanock. She corresponded with friends and relatives, writing about her isolation and the beauty of her surroundings. An example excerpt from her poem An Evening Prospect:

"Cast your eyes beyond this meadow,

Painted by a hand divine,

And observe the ample shadow

of that solemn ridge of pine."

During this time she also had two daughters—Margaretta, born October 11, 1771, and Abeltje (Abella), born June 5, 1776.

On November 11, 1775, her husband was one of several appointed Deputies (or delegates) from Albany County to the Provincial Congress. Her husband encouraged her writing, he called it "her genius". In the winter of 1779, Bleecker published a periodical called the "Albany Gazette". The Gazette was composed entirely of her political essays, poems, and short stories, produced for the sole purpose of sharing entertainment and news with friends and relatives.

== Impact of the American Revolution ==
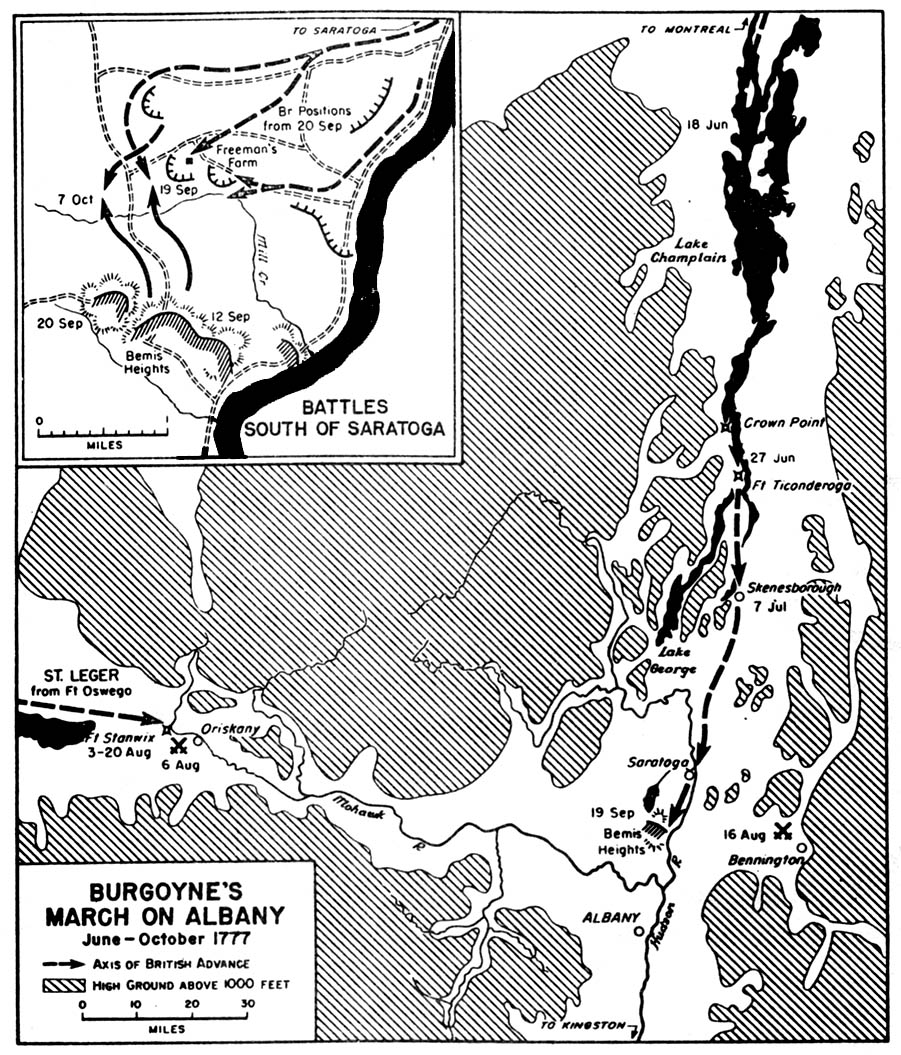
Saratoga campaign, Tomhannock is just north of Albany and south of Saratoga, New York

In 1777, the Bleeckers' pastoral lives were interrupted by the American Revolutionary War. British troops, under the command of General John Burgoyne, invaded Tomhannock from Canada (as part of Burgoyne's Saratoga campaign to capture the Hudson River). In response, John Bleecker joined the New York Militia, and Ann Bleecker fled southward.

Ann Bleecker was forced to flee to Albany on foot with her two daughters, infant Abella and 6-year-old Margaretta. Along the way, Abella died of dysentery. Joined by her mother and sister Caty Swits, Ann Bleecker continued on to Red Hook, but her mother died en route there. An excerpt of a poem she wrote, Written in the retreat from Burgoyne, describing how she felt about her daughters death:

At length her languid eyes clos'd from the day,
The idol of my soul was torn away;
Her spirit fled and left me ghastly clay!
Then — then my soul rejected all relief,
Comfort I wish'd not for, I lov'd my grief:
'Hear, my Abella!' cried I, 'hear me mourn,'

After Burgoyne's surrender on October 17, 1777 (part of the aftermath of the Saratoga Campaign), Ann Bleecker, her daughter and sister (all that remained of the family), and possibly a slave child returned to Tomhannock. Caty Swits (1743–77) died during the return journey, devastating Ann Bleecker.

Her husband continued to serve in the militia. In 1779, Ann Bleecker was forced (it is unclear whether due to British troop activity, Native American activity, or some other reason) to flee with her surviving daughter to Albany again. But further trauma was yet to come. On hearing in 1781 that her husband had been captured by Loyalist forces or possibly "a band of wandering British soldiers", she suffered a miscarriage and nervous breakdown. Ann Bleecker never fully recovered from all these traumatic events. Her daughter, Margaretta Faugeres, later described how Bleecker developed a tendency toward depression and there was a melancholy reflection in her writings:

"…she was frequently very lively, and would then give way to the flights of her fertile fancy, and write songs, satires, and burlesque: but . . . the heaviest dejection would succeed, and then all the pieces which were not as melancholy as herself, she destroyed."

Ann Eliza Bleecker died November 23, 1783. She is buried in the cemetery of the Reformed Dutch church in Albany (though all bodies buried there were moved to Albany Rural Cemetery in the early twentieth-century).

== Literary impact ==
Bleecker did not write for posterity; she wrote letters to her friends and relatives which contained poems and short stories, which were later collected and published by her daughter.

=== Posthumous publication ===
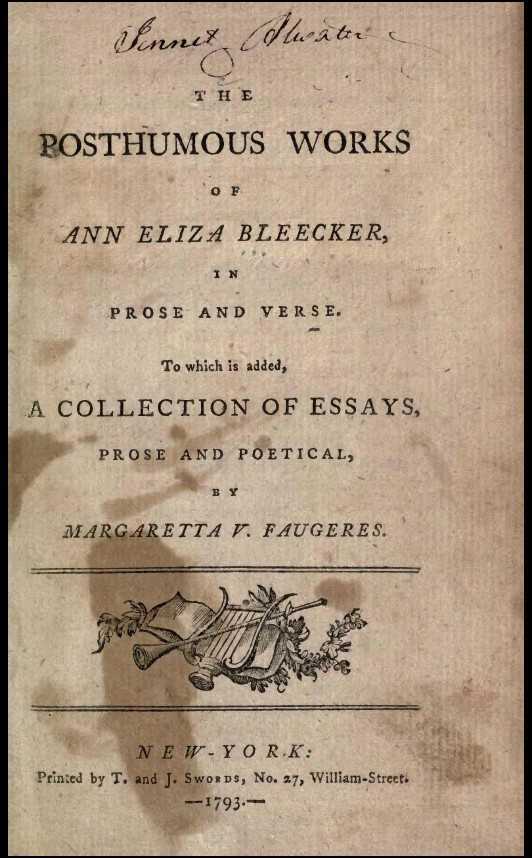
Title page of The Posthumous Works of Ann Eliza Bleecker

In 1793, a significant part of Bleecker's work, after first appearing in The New-York Magazine in 1790 and 1791, was published by her daughter, Margaretta V. Bleecker Faugères, who was also a poet. She edited her mother's writings and added some of her own poems and essays to a collection entitled The Posthumous Works of Ann Eliza Bleecker; she included thirty-six poems, twenty-three letters, an unfinished short historical novel, The History of Henry and Ann, and The History of Maria Kittle, a captivity narrative set during the French and Indian War. Due to its popularity, The History of Maria Kittle was republished separately in 1797.

=== Maria Kittle ===
Bleecker's epistolary novel The History of Maria Kittle took the Indian Captivity story genre in new directions, as it was possibly the first American fictional account focusing on Native Americans. In the late 18th century, Indian Captivity stories subsequently became very popular. Maria Kittle has many features typical of the Indian Captivity story; there are many graphic scenes of violence, and it describes Native Americans as terrible savages who cruelly kill babies and women, and tells the story of Maria's journey as a captive. But by the end of the story, Maria gets rescued, and the real emotion comes out as three women in the story tearfully recount their stories of maternal loss to others. This story has many similarities to Bleecker's own experience with the death of her own daughter as a result of fleeing from the British Army. In telling her tale of loss, Bleecker hoped to help women overcome their tragedies. Yet these stories also helped foster racism toward Native Americans.

Bleecker's writing was exciting for the time, and her sense of style added dimension to a new type of novel, the didactic novel. Her expression was influenced by the "eighteenth-century British cult of sensibility". She wrote in a mannered, and often exaggerated way, to express her moral lesson. In addition, she used the epistolic literary device, structuring the story as a series of letters to her half-sister, Susan Ten Eyck, in which she interrupted the narrative to comment on the action and address Susan directly.

=== Poems ===
Ann Eliza Bleecker's pastoral poems exemplified a new style of American poetry, and, due to her experience of the American Revolutionary tumult, a new sense of national identity. These poems, written in the pastoral tradition, conveyed both the beauty of the colonial New York countryside and the horrific impact of war, suffering, death, and destruction. Because Bleecker was writing from the interesting perspective of a terrified young mother, her articulate depictions of the Revolutionary War are still read by historians today.
