= Jackson Johonnet =

"Jackson Johonnet" was the pseudonymous author of a spurious Indian captivity narrative that enjoyed much popularity in the mid-1790s and was thereafter incorporated into the “canonical” body of accounts of white imprisonments, tortures and sufferings due to Native Americans.

The narrative tells the story of a young man of 17 who leaves his family's farm in Falmouth, Massachusetts (now Maine), to seek his fortune in Boston. Unable to get work, he falls prey to the wiles of an army recruiter, enlists, and is despatched to the “West” (in this case Ohio) to serve with the army. He is almost immediately captured by Indians, taken to their villages on the upper Miami River, and witnesses the torture and death of fellow captives. He escapes with an associate and makes his way back to the army in time to participate in the notorious and disastrous battle known variously as the Battle of the Wabash or St. Clair's Defeat. Numerous points in the narrative contradict established facts in the history of the 1791 campaign, and other events seem to be embellishments supplied by someone unfamiliar with the western geography or actualities of Indian warfare.

The work was first published in Beers's Almanac and Ephemera ... for 1793 (Hartford, 1792). It proved exceedingly popular, and had at least eight reprint editions in the following two years. Its publication followed two years of unsuccessful military campaigns against a coalition of Native Americans in Ohio, led by Little Turtle and Blue Jacket, that included Miami, Shawnee, Kickapoo, Piankashaw, Wea, and Delaware tribes. The Northwest Territory was rendered unsafe for settlement, and President George Washington and Congress were endeavoring to increase the standing army and provide for defense of the frontier. The “Johonnet” narrative packed much action and adventure in a relatively short space, and its portrayal of the Indians served to justify the efforts for the military conquest of their territories then under preparation.

The popularity of the Johonnet narrative is testified by its immediate reprinting in separate book form in seven separate editions in 1793—at Boston, MA; Keene, NH; Newburyport, MA (2); Providence, RI; Windsor, VT; and Concord, MA. The 1793 Providence edition claimed to be a reprint of one issued in 1791 in Lexington, Kentucky, but no other evidence of that earlier form has been found. Further editions were issued at Walpole, NH, in 1795, and at Salem, MA, in 1802. It was soon included in numerous anthologies of Indian captivity narratives, including Affecting History of the Dreadful Distresses of Frederic Manheim's Family, etc. (Philadelphia, 1800), Samuel L. Metcalfe's A Collection of Some of the Most Interesting Narratives of Indian Warfare in the West (Lexington, KY, 1820), and others. Some later editions spell the last name as "Johonnot."

External evidence for the existence of “Jackson Johonnet” is lacking. The family does not appear in the 1790 census for Falmouth, Maine (then part of Massachusetts); nor has any trace of “Jackson Johonnet,” other than the printed narrative, been found. Internal evidence within the Remarkable Adventures suggests that the entire narrative is an invention, based in part upon published reports of the battle it describes (known generally as the Battle of the Wabash). The chronology and geography of the narrative contain several points that contradict the known facts: 1. General Josiah Harmar had been relieved of command of the western army in March 1791 (before Johonnet left Falmouth); 2. Fort Jefferson was not constructed until October 1791 (although the narrator claims to have arrived there September 18); and 3. the site of Braddock's defeat, near present-day Pittsburgh, PA, is roughly 275 miles east of the site of Fort Jefferson (near present-day Greenville, Ohio). Other portions of the narrative (such as the narrator's marksmanship with a musket at 40 yards, or the persistence of human remains after 36 years) also test the reader's credulity.
