= Captivity narrative =

Genre of propaganda literature

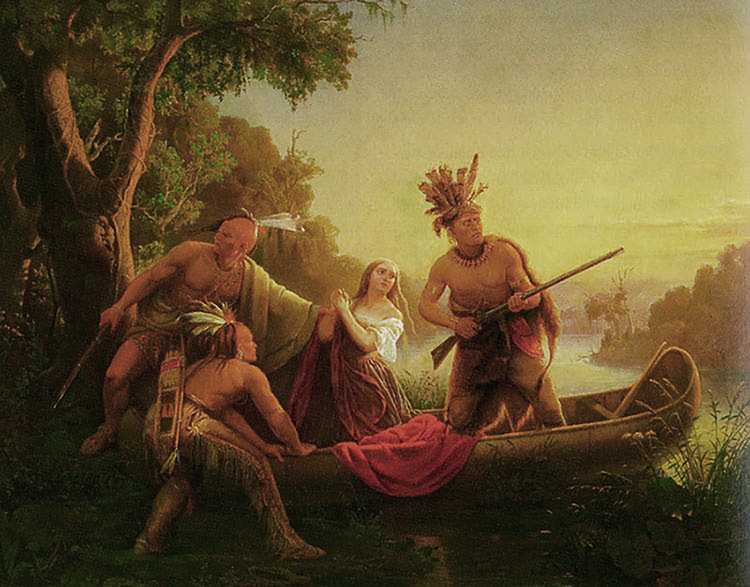
The Abduction of Daniel Boone's Daughter by the Indians, Charles Ferdinand Wimar, 1853

Captivity narratives are typically personal accounts of people who have been captured by an enemy, generally an enemy with a foreign culture. The best-known captivity narratives in North America are those concerning Europeans and Americans taken as captives and held by the Indigenous peoples of North America. These narratives have had an enduring place in literature, history, ethnography, and the study of Native peoples.

They were preceded, among English-speaking peoples, by publication of captivity narratives related to English people taken captive and held by Barbary pirates, or sold for ransom or slavery. Others were taken captive in the Middle East. These accounts established some of the major elements of the form, often putting it within a religious framework, and crediting God or Providence for gaining freedom or salvation. Following the North American experience, additional accounts were written after British people were captured during exploration and settlement in India and East Asia.

Since the late 20th century, captivity narratives have also been studied as accounts of persons leaving, or held in contemporary religious cults or movements, thanks to scholars of religion like David G. Bromley and James R. Lewis.

A famous example of a captivity narrative, that historians regard as one of the first of its kind, is the personal account of Mary Rowlandson. Mary Rowlandson was a colonial American woman who was captured by Native Americans in 1676 during King Philip's War and held for 11 weeks before being ransomed. In 1682, six years after her ordeal, The Sovereignty and Goodness of God: Being a Narrative of the Captivity and Restoration of Mrs. Mary Rowlandson was published.

Certain North American captivity narratives related to being held among Native peoples were published from the 18th through the 19th centuries. There had already been numerous English accounts of captivity by Barbary pirates.

Other types of captivity narratives, such as those recounted by apostates from religious movements (i.e. "cult survivor" tales), have remained an enduring topic in modern media. They have been published in books and periodicals, in addition to being the subjects of film and television programs, both fiction and non-fiction.

== Background ==
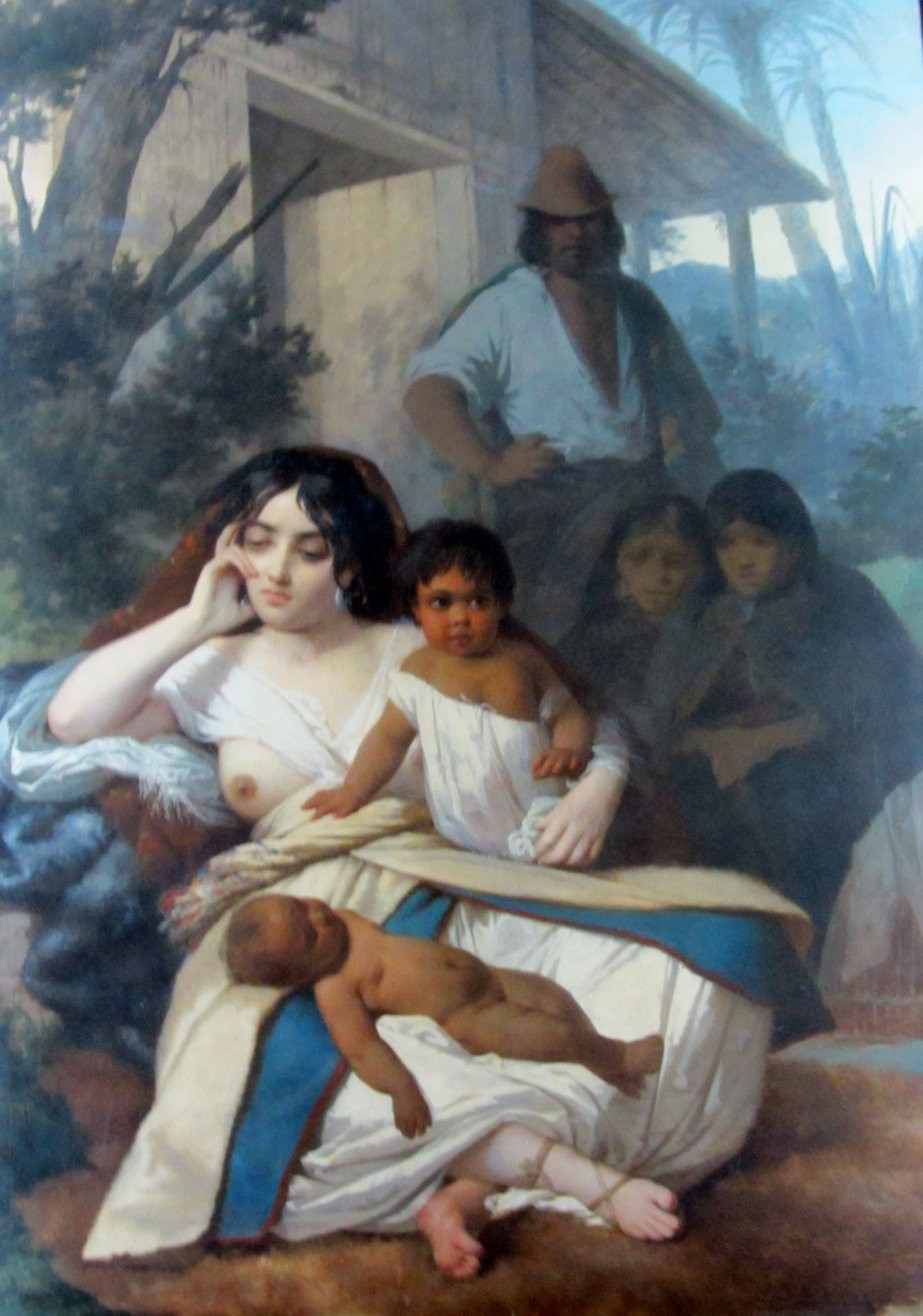
Elisa Bravo Jaramillo by Raymond Monvoisin

Because of the competition between New France and New England in North America, raiding between the colonies was frequent. Colonists in New England were frequently taken captive by Canadiens and their Indian allies (similarly, the New Englanders and their Indian allies took Canadiens and Indian prisoners captive). According to Kathryn Derounian-Stodola, statistics on the number of captives taken from the 15th through the 19th centuries are imprecise and unreliable, since record-keeping was not consistent and the fate of hostages who disappeared or died was often not known. Yet conservative estimates run into the thousands, and a more realistic figure may well be higher. Between King Philip's War (1675) and the last of the French and Indian Wars (1763), approximately 1,641 New Englanders were taken hostage. During the decades-long struggle between whites and Plains Indians in the mid-19th century, hundreds of women and children were captured.

Many narratives included a theme of redemption by faith in the face of the threats and temptations of an alien way of life. Barbary captivity narratives, accounts of English people captured and held by Barbary pirates, were popular in England in the 16th and 17th centuries. The first Barbary captivity narrative by a resident of North America was that of Abraham Browne (1655). The most popular was that of Captain James Riley, entitled An Authentic Narrative of the Loss of the Brig Commerce (1817).

Jonathan Dickinson's Journal, God's Protecting Providence ... (1699), is an account by a Quaker of shipwreck survivors captured by Indians in Florida. He says they survived by placing their trust in God to protect them. The Cambridge History of English and American Literature describes it as, "in many respects the best of all the captivity tracts."

Ann Eliza Bleecker's epistolary novel, The History of Maria Kittle (1793), is considered the first known captivity novel. It set the form for subsequent Indian capture novels.

== Origins of narratives ==
=== New England and the Southern colonies ===
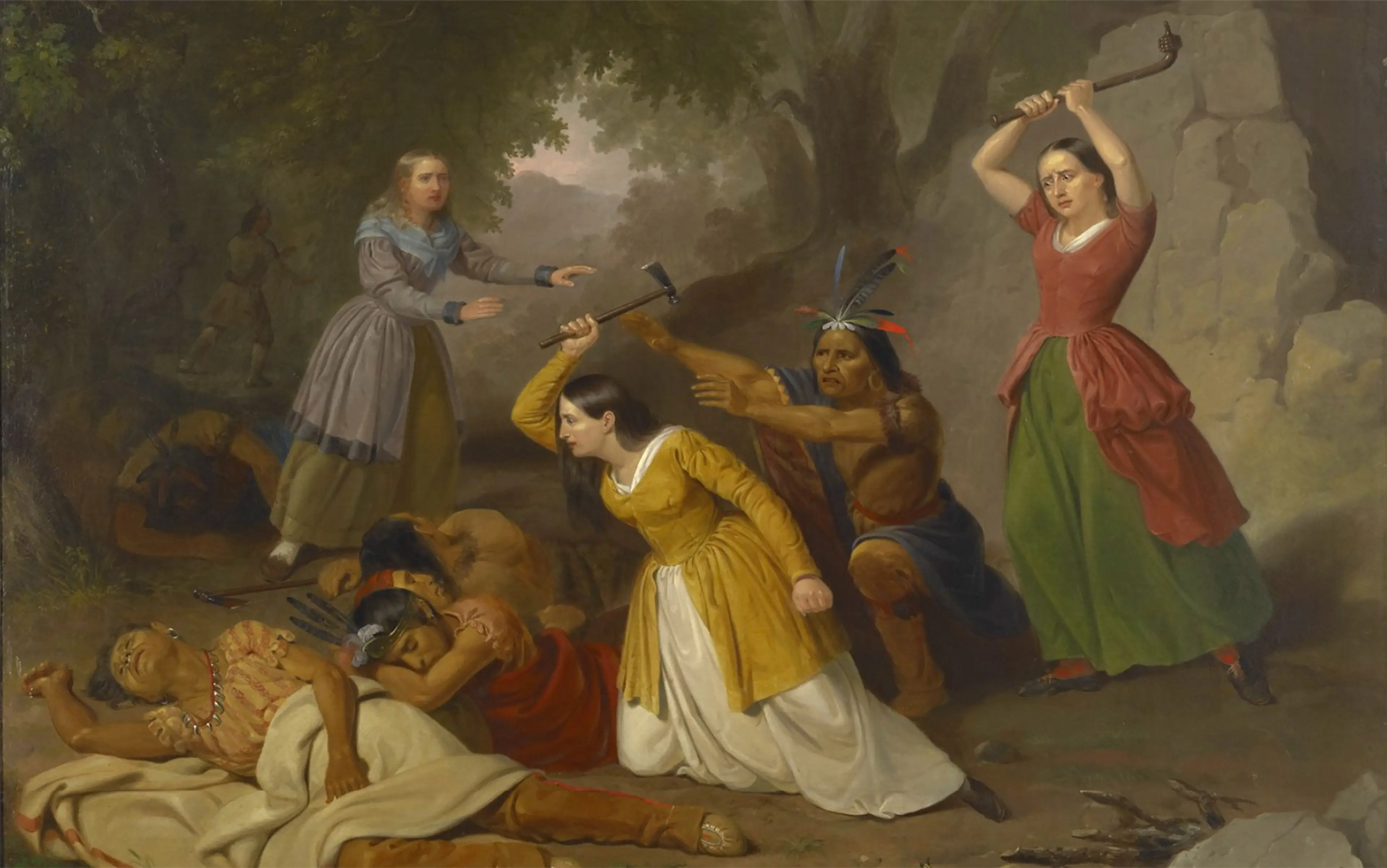
Hannah Duston by Junius Brutus Stearns

American Indian captivity narratives, accounts of men and women of European descent who were captured by Native Americans, were popular in both America and Europe from the 17th century until the close of the United States frontier late in the 19th century. Mary Rowlandson's memoir, A Narrative of the Captivity and Restoration of Mrs. Mary Rowlandson, (1682) is a classic example of the genre. According to Nancy Armstrong and Leonard Tennenhouse, Rowlandson's captivity narrative was "one of the most popular captivity narratives on both sides of the Atlantic." Although the text temporarily fell out of print after 1720, it had a revival of interest in the 1780s. Other popular captivity narratives from the late 17th century include Cotton Mather's "A Notable Exploit: Dux Faemina Facti," on the captivity of Hannah Duston, as well as his account of Hannah Swarton's captivity (1697), both well-known accounts of the capture of women during King William's War, and Jonathan Dickinson's God's Protecting Providence (1699).

American captivity narratives were usually based on true events, but they frequently contained fictional elements as well. Some were entirely fictional, created because the stories were popular. One spurious captivity narrative was The Remarkable Adventures of Jackson Johonnet, of Massachusetts (Boston, 1793). Another is that of Nelson Lee.

Captivity in another culture brought into question many aspects of the captives' lives. Reflecting their religious beliefs, the Puritans tended to write narratives that negatively characterized Indians. They portrayed the trial of events as a warning from God concerning the state of the Puritans' souls, and concluded that God was the only hope for redemption. Such a religious cast had also been part of the framework of earlier English accounts of captivity by Barbary pirates. The numerous conflicts between Anglo-American colonists and the French and Native Americans led to the emphasis of Indians' cruelty in English-language captivity narratives, which served to inspire hatred for their enemies. In William Flemming's Narrative of the Sufferings (1750), Indian barbarities are blamed on the teachings of Roman Catholic priests.

During Queen Anne's War, French and Abenaki warriors made the Raid on Deerfield in 1704, killing many settlers and taking more than 100 persons captive. They were taken on a several hundred-mile overland trek to Montreal. Many were held there in Canada for an extended period, with some captives adopted by First Nations families and others held for ransom. In the colonies, ransoms were raised by families or communities; there was no higher government program to do so. The minister John Williams was among those captured and ransomed. His account, The Redeemed Captive (1707), was widely distributed in the 18th and 19th centuries, and continues to be published today. Due to his account, as well as the high number of captives, this raid, unlike others of the time, was remembered and became an element in the American frontier story.

During Father Rale's War, Indians raided Dover, New Hampshire. Elizabeth Hanson wrote a captivity narrative after gaining return to her people. Susannah Willard Johnson of New Hampshire wrote about her captivity during the French and Indian War (the North American front of the Seven Years' War).

In the final 30 years of the 18th century, there was a revival of interest in captivity narratives. Accounts such as A Narrative of the Capture and Treatment of John Dodge, by the English at Detroit (1779), A Surprising Account, of the Captivity and Escape of Philip M'Donald, and Alexander M'Leod, of Virginia, from the Chickkemogga Indians (1786), Abraham Panther's A Very Surprising Narrative of a Young Woman, Who Was Discovered in a Rocky Cave (1787), Narrative of the Remarkable Occurrences, in the Life of John Blatchford of Cape-Ann (1788), and A Narrative of the Captivity and Sufferings of Mr. Ebenezer Fletcher, of Newipswich, Who Was ... Taken Prisoner by the British (1798) provided American reading audiences with new narratives. In some accounts, British soldiers were the primary antagonists.

=== Nova Scotia and Acadia ===
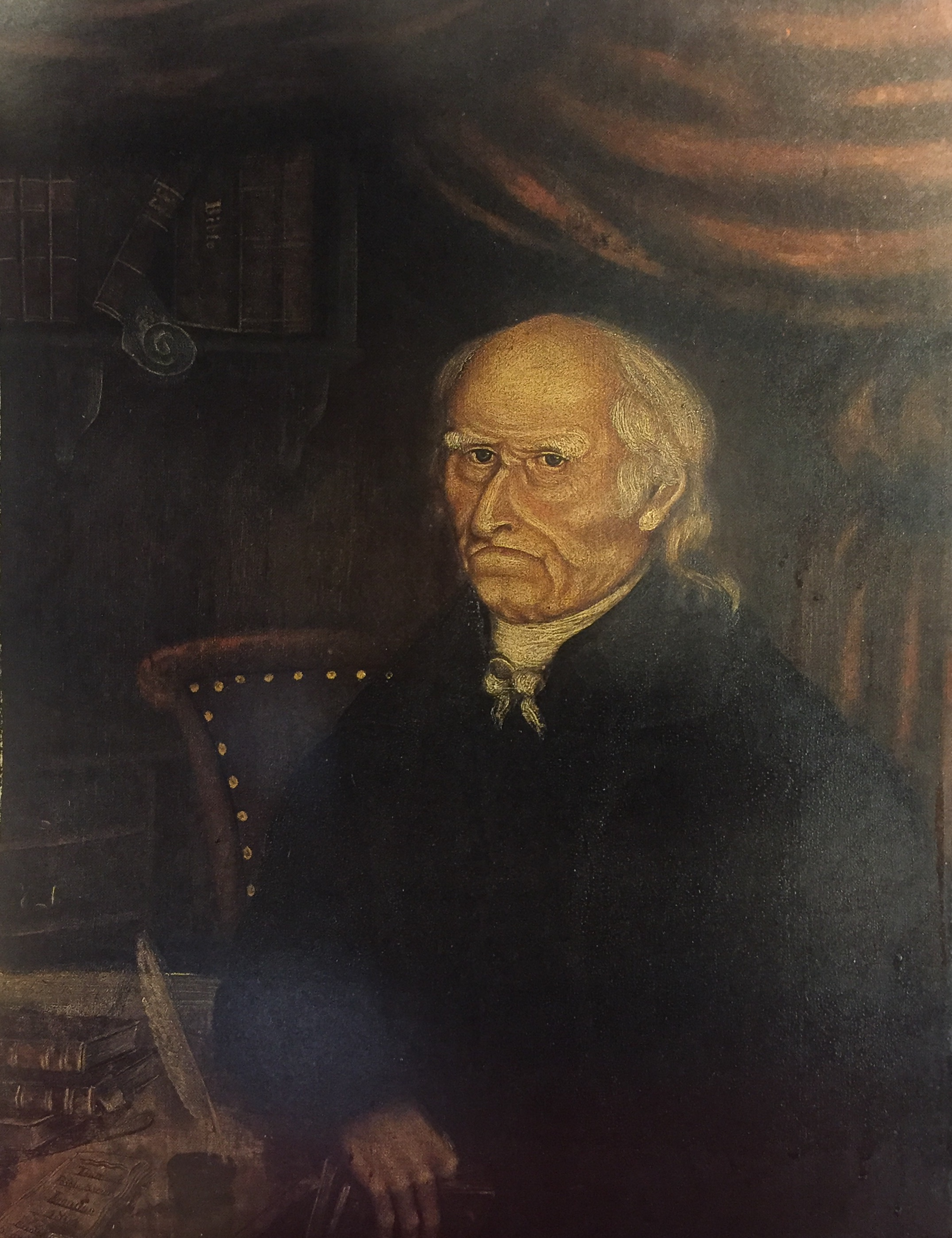
John Payzant (1749–1834) – captive taken at Lunenburg, Nova Scotia

Seven captivity narratives are known that were written following capture of colonists by the Mi'kmaq and Maliseet tribes in Nova Scotia and Acadia (two other prisoners were future Governor Michael Francklin (taken 1754) and Lt John Hamilton (taken 1749) at the Siege of Grand Pre. Whether their captivity experiences were documented is unknown).

The most well-known became that by John Gyles, who wrote Memoirs of odd adventures, strange deliverances, &c. in the captivity of John Gyles, Esq; commander of the garrison on St. George's River (1736). He was captured in the Siege of Pemaquid (1689). He wrote about his torture by the Natives at Meductic village during King William's War. His memoirs are regarded as a precursor to the frontier romances of James Fenimore Cooper, William Gilmore Simms, and Robert Montgomery Bird.

Merchant William Pote was captured during the siege of Annapolis Royal during King George's War and wrote about his captivity. Pote also wrote about being tortured. Ritual torture of war captives was common among Native American tribes, who used it as a kind of passage.

Henry Grace was taken captive by the Mi'kmaq near Fort Cumberland during Father Le Loutre's War. His narrative was entitled, The History of the Life and Sufferings of Henry Grace (Boston, 1764). Anthony Casteel was taken in the Attack at Jeddore during the same war, and also wrote an account of his experience.

The fifth captivity narrative, by John Payzant, recounts his being taken prisoner with his mother and three siblings during the Raid on Lunenburg (1756) by the First Nations (Maliseet/Wolastoqiyik) in the French and Indian War. On route to Quebec, John and his siblings were adopted by the First Nations in present-day New Brunswick but were reunited with their mother in Quebec about seven months later. In the spring of 1760, after the British victory at the Battle of the Plains of Abraham in 1759, the family sailed back to Nova Scotia. In a separate event John Witherspoon was captured at Annapolis Royal during the French and Indian War and wrote about his experience.

During the war Gamaliel Smethurst was captured; he published an account in 1774. Lt. Simon Stephens, of John Stark's ranger company, and Captain Robert Stobo escaped together from Quebec along the coast of Acadia, finally reaching British-controlled Louisbourg and wrote accounts.

During the Petitcodiac River Campaign, the Acadian militia took prisoner William Caesar McCormick of William Stark's rangers and his detachment of three rangers and two light infantry privates from the 35th. The Acadian militia took the prisoners to Miramichi and then Restogouch. (They were kept by Pierre du Calvet who later released them to Halifax.) In August 1758, William Merritt was taken captive close to St. Georges (Thomaston, Maine), and taken to the Saint John River and later to Quebec.

=== North Africa ===
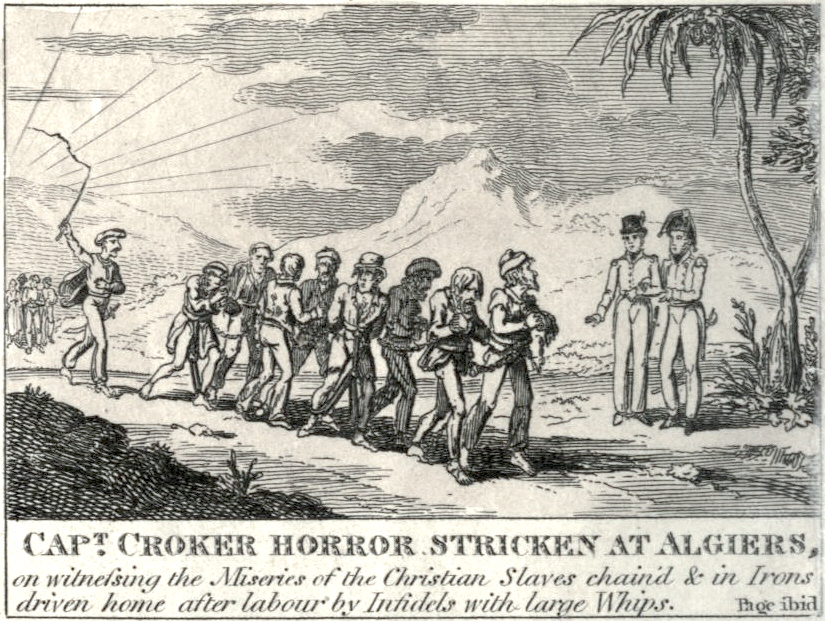
British captain witnessing the miseries of Christian slaves in Algiers, 1815

North America was not the only region to produce captivity narratives. North African slave narratives were written by white Europeans and Americans who were captured, often as a result of shipwrecks, and enslaved in North Africa in the 18th and early 19th centuries. If the Europeans converted to Islam and adopted North Africa as their home, they could often end their slavery status, but such actions disqualified them from being ransomed to freedom by European consuls in Africa, who were qualified only to free captives who had remained Christians. About 20,000 British and Irish captives were held in North Africa from the beginning of the 17th century to the middle of the 18th, and roughly 700 Americans were held captive as North African slaves between 1785 and 1815. The British captives produced 15 full biographical accounts of their experiences, and the American captives produced more than 100 editions of 40 full-length narratives.

== Conclusions ==
This article references captivity narratives drawn from literature, history, sociology, religious studies, and modern media. Scholars point to certain unifying factors. Of early Puritan captivity narratives, David L. Minter writes:

First they became instruments of propaganda against Indian "devils" and French "Papists." Later, ... the narratives played an important role in encouraging government protection of frontier settlements. Still later they became pulp thrillers, always gory and sensational, frequently plagiaristic and preposterous.

In its "Terms & Themes" summary of captivity narratives, the University of Houston at Clear Lake suggests that:

In American literature, captivity narratives often relate particularly to the capture of European-American settlers or explorers by Native American Indians, but the captivity narrative is so inherently powerful that the story proves highly adaptable to new contents from terrorist kidnappings to UFO abductions.

- Anticipates popular fiction, esp. romance narrative: action, blood, suffering, redemption – a page-turner
- Anticipates or prefigures Gothic literature with depictions of Indian "other" as dark, hellish, cunning, unpredictable
- Test of ethnic faith or loyalty: Will captive "go native," crossing to the other side, esp. by intermarriage?

The Oxford Companion to United States History indicates that the wave of Catholic immigration after 1820:

provided a large, visible enemy and intensified fears for American institutions and values. These anxieties inspired vicious anti-Catholic propaganda with pornographic overtones, such as Maria Monk's Awful Disclosures[.]

Alexandra Heller-Nicholas (quoted earlier) points to the presence of a "helpless" maiden, and a "hero" who rescues her.

Together, these analyses suggest that some of the common elements we may encounter in different types of captivity narratives include:

- A captor portrayed as quintessentially evil
- A suffering victim, often female
- A romantic or sexual encounter occurring in an "alien" culture
- An heroic rescue, often by a male hero
- An element of propaganda

== Notable captivity narratives ==
=== 15th–16th centuries ===
- Johann Schiltberger (1460), Reisebuch
- Álvar Núñez Cabeza de Vaca (1542), La Relacion (The Report); Translated as The Narrative of Cabeza De Vaca by Rolena Adorno and Patrick Charles Pautz.
- Hans Staden (1557), True Story and Description of a Country of Wild, Naked, Grim, Man-eating People in the New World, America
- Hernando de Escalante Fontaneda (1575), Memoir On the Country and Ancient Indian Tribes Of Florida

=== 17th century ===
- Gentleman of Elvas (1609), Narrative of the captivity of Juan Ortiz, a Spaniard, Who Was Eleven Years a Prisoner Among the Indians of Florida
- Fernão Mendes Pinto (1614), Pilgrimage
- Anthony Knivet (1625), The Admirable Adventures and Strange Fortunes of Master Antonie Knivet
- Ólafur Egilsson (c. 1628–1639) [1852], Lítil saga umm herhlaup Tyrkjans á Íslandi árið 1627
- Robert Knox (1659–1678), An Historical Relation of the Island Ceylon
- Hendrick Hamel (1668), Hamel's Journal and a Description of the Kingdom of Korea, 1653–1666
- Francisco Núñez de Pineda y Bascuñán (1673), Cautiverio feliz y razón individual de las guerras dilatadas del reino de Chile (Happy Captivity and Reason for the Prolonged Wars of the Kingdom of Chile)
- Mary Rowlandson (1682), The Sovereignty and Goodness of God
- Cotton Mather (1697), "A Notable Exploit: Dux Faemina Facti," (the captivity of Hannah Duston); and "A Narrative of Hannah Swarton, Containing Wonderful Passages, relating to her Captivity, and her Deliverance," both published in Magnalia Christi Americana.

=== 18th century ===
- John Williams (1709), The Redeemed Captive
- Robert Drury (1729), Madagascar, or Robert Drury's Journal
- John Gyles (1736), Memoirs of odd adventures, strange deliverances, &c. in the captivity of John Gyles, Esq; commander of the garrison on St. George's River
- Thomas Pellow (1740), The History of the Long Captivity and Adventures of Thomas Pellow
- John Peter Salling (1745), The Journal of John Peter Salling
- Lucy Terry Prince (1746), "Bars Fight"
- Nehemiah How (1748), A Narrative of the Captivity of Nehemiah How in 1745-1747
- Jane Frazier (1756), Narrative of the Captivity of Jane Frazier
- William and Elizabeth Fleming (1756) A narrative of the sufferings and surprizing deliverances of William and Elizabeth Fleming, who were taken captive by Capt. Jacob, commander of the Indians, who lately made the incursions on the frontier of Pennsylvania, as related by themselves.
- Charles Stuart (1757, published in 1926) The Captivity of Charles Stuart, 1755-57
- Jacob Hochstetler (1758) "Examination of (Jacob) Hochstattler"
- Marie Le Roy and Barbara Leininger (1759), The Narrative of Marie Le Roy and Barbara Leininger, for Three Years Captives Among the Indians
- Mariana Hoeth (1760, published 1896) "The Surprise and Massacre at Frederic Hoeth's Plantation in 1755, and the Subsequent Fortunes of His Daughter, Mariana."
- Jean Lowry (1760), "A Journal of the Captivity of Jean Lowry and Her Children, Giving an Account of her being taken by the Indians, the 1st of April 1756, from William McCord's, in Rocky-Spring Settlement in Pennsylvania, With an Account of the Hardships she Suffered, &c."
- Ethan Allen (1779), A narrative of Colonel Ethan Allen's captivity, from the time of his being taken by the British, near Montreal, on the 25th day of September, in the year 1775, to the time of his exchange, on the 6th day of May, 1778 : containing voyages and travels ... Interspersed with some political observations
- William Walton (1784), The Captivity of Benjamin Gilbert and His Family, 1780–83
- Mercy Harbison (1792), The Capture and Escape of Mercy Harbison, 1792
- Arthur Bradman (1794), A narrative of the extraordinary sufferings of Mr. Robert Forbes, his wife, and five children during an unfortunate journey through the wilderness, from Canada to Kennebeck River, in the year 1784, in which three of their children were starved to death
- Susannah Willard Johnson (1796), A Narrative of the Captivity of Mrs. Johnson, Containing an Account of Her Sufferings During Four Years With the Indians and French
- Ann Eliza Bleecker (1797), The History of Maria Kittle, novel
- Venture Smith (1798), A Narrative of the Life and Adventures of Venture, a Native of Africa: But Resident above Sixty Years in the United States of America, Related by Himself.
- James Smith (1799), An Account of the Remarkable Occurrences ... in the years 1755, '56, '57, '58 & 59

=== 19th century ===
- John R. Jewitt (1803–1805), A Narrative of the Adventures and Sufferings of John R. Jewitt, only survivor of the crew of the ship Boston, during a captivity of nearly three years among the savages of Nootka Sound: with an account of the manners, mode of living, and religious opinions of the natives
- Hugh Gibson (1811), An Account of the Captivity of Hugh Gibson
- James Riley (1815), Sufferings in Africa
- Robert Adams (1816), The Narrative of Robert Adams
- Zadock Steele (1818), The Indian Captive; Or, A Narrative of the Captivity and Sufferings of Zadock Steele
- John Ingles (c. 1824), The Story of Mary Draper Ingles and Son Thomas Ingles
- Mary Jemison (1824), A Narrative of the Life of Mrs. Mary Jemison
- William Biggs (1826), Narrative of the captivity of William Biggs among the Kickapoo Indians in Illinois in 1788
- William Lay (1828), A Narrative of the Mutiny, on Board the Ship Globe, of Nantucket, in the Pacific Ocean, Jan. 1824 And the journal of a residence of two years on the Mulgrave Islands; with observations on the manners and customs of the inhabitants
- John Tanner (1830), A Narrative of the captivity and adventures of John Tanner, thirty years of residence among the Indians, prepared for the press by Edwin James
- Thomas Andros (1833), The Old Jersey Captive: Or, A Narrative of the Captivity of Thomas Andros...on Board the Old Jersey Prison Ship at New York, 1781
- Maria Monk (1836), The Awful Disclosures of Maria Monk
- Eliza Fraser (1837), Narrative of the capture, sufferings, and miraculous escape of Mrs. Eliza Fraser
- Timothy Alden (1837), An Account of the Captivity of Hugh Gibson among the Delaware Indians of the Big Beaver and the Muskingum, from the latter part of July 1756, to the beginning of April, 1759
- Rachel Plummer (1838), Rachael Plummer's Narrative of Twenty One Months Servitude as a Prisoner Among the Commanchee Indians
- Sarah Ann Horn with E. House (1839), A Narrative of the Captivity of Mrs. Horn, and Her Two Children, with Mrs. Harris, by the Camanche Indians
- Herman Melville (1847), Omoo: A Narrative of Adventures in the South Seas
- Christophorus Castanis (1851), The Greek Exile; or, A Narrative of the Captivity and Escape of Christophorus Plato Castanis, During the Massacre on the Island of Scio, by the Turks, Together with Various Adventures in Greece and America
- Matthew Brayton (1860), The Indian Captive A Narrative of the Adventures and Sufferings of Matthew Brayton in His Thirty-Four Years of Captivity Among the Indians of North-Western America
- Mary Butler Renville (1863), A Thrilling Narrative of Indian Captivity
- Sarah F. Wakefield (1864), Six Weeks in the Sioux Tepees
- Fanny Kelly (1871), Narrative of My Captivity among the Sioux Indians
- John McCullough (1876), The Captivity of John McCullough, originally published as A narrative of the captivity of John McCullough, ESQ, in 1832
- James Smith (1876), The Remarkable Adventures of Col. James Smith, Five Years a Captive Among Indians
- Gardner, Abbie (1885). History of the Spirit Lake massacre and captivity of Miss Abbie Gardner. Des Moines: Iowa Print. Co.
- Pote, William (1896). The Journal of Captain William Pote, Jr., during his Captivity in the French and Indian War from May, 1745, to August, 1747. New York: Dodd, Mead & Company.

=== 20th century ===
- Herman Lehmann (1927), Nine Years Among the Indians
- Clinton L. Smith (1927), The Boy Captives
- Helena Valero (1965), Yanoama: The Story of Helena Valero, a Girl Kidnapped by Amazonian Indians
- F. Bruce Lamb (1971), Wizard of the Upper Amazon: The Story of Manuel Córdova-Rios
- Michelle Smith and Lawrence Pazder (1980), Michelle Remembers
- Patty Hearst and Alvin Moscow (1982), Patty Hearst – Her Own Story
- Terry Waite (1993), Taken on Trust

== Artistic adaptations ==
=== In film ===
- The Searchers (1956), directed by John Ford and starring John Wayne, is a drama about a man's search for his niece who was taken captive by Comanche in the American West. The film was primarily about him and his search, and was influential because of the multiple psychological layers in the character portrayal. The movie is loosely based on the 1836 kidnapping of nine-year-old Cynthia Ann Parker by Comanche warriors.
- A Man Called Horse (1970), directed by Elliot Silverstein and starring Richard Harris, is a drama about a man captured by the Sioux, who is initially enslaved and mocked by being treated as an animal, but comes to respect his captors' culture and gain their respect. It spawned two sequels, The Return of a Man Called Horse (1976) and Triumphs of a Man Called Horse (1983).
- Where The Spirit Lives (1989), written by Keith Leckie, directed by Bruce Pittman, and starring Michelle St. John, is a "reverse" captivity narrative. It tells the story of Ashtecome, a First Nations (Canadian native) girl who is kidnapped and sent to a residential missionary school, where she is abused.

=== In music ===
- Cello-rock band Rasputina parodied captivity narratives in their song "My Captivity by Savages", from their album Frustration Plantation (2004).
- Voltaire's song "Cannibal Buffet", from the album Ooky Spooky (2007), is a humorous take on captivity narratives.

=== In poetry ===
- Hilary Holladay's book of poems, The Dreams of Mary Rowlandson, recreates Rowlandson's capture by Indians in poetic vignettes.
- W. B. Yeats (1889), "The Stolen Child", in which a human child is "stolen" by faeries and indoctrinated into their alien way of life.
