= Nelson Lee (raconteur) =

Nelson Lee was born in Brownsville, Jefferson County, New York, in 1807. He died in poverty in Hammond's Corners in New York, on December 21, 1870. In 1859 an account of his life was published by a group of editors "not quite in his own words". Like some other Native American captivity narratives of the 19th-century, its "chief concern, was neither accuracy of sensation nor fidelity to the hard facts of frontier life, but rather the salability of pulp thrillers."

The account tells us that he took part in various campaigns (his name does not appear on the relevant muster rolls) and had dramatic adventures (such as saving his life among the Comanches by the use of a particularly loud alarm watch).

He also describes Comanche customs (agriculture and fixed, organized, towns) that had no relation to reality.

His work is regarded as a hoax. It has nevertheless been much-reprinted, used by serious anthropologists, and appears in many collections of captivity narratives.
