= Elizabeth Hanson (captive) =

Elizabeth Meader Hanson (September 17, 1684 – c. 1737) was a colonial Anglo-American woman from Dover, New Hampshire, who survived Native American Abenaki capture and captivity in the year 1725 alongside four of her children. Five months after capture, a French family ransomed Elizabeth and her two children in Canada. Her husband was then able to secure them and find another daughter before having to return home, leaving the eldest daughter, Sarah, behind. Elizabeth's captivity narrative became popular because of its detailed insights into Native American captivity, which was a threat to the people in New England due to the almost constant wars with the Native Americans and French in the seventeenth and eighteenth centuries. Her religious take on her experiences was heavily emphasized in her story.

== Biography ==
Hanson was born Elizabeth Meader, the youngest of four children. Her parents were John Meader Jr. and Sarah Follett. Little is known about her life before captivity other than her wedding date, July 23, 1703, to John Hanson, when she was nineteen. The two had nine children together, including Hannah, Sarah, Elizabeth, John, Isaac, Daniel, Caleb, Ebenezer, and the young baby taken captive with her.

Because Elizabeth and her family were Quakers, they refused to take refuge in the garrison when the Abenaki first attacked their area during Dummer's War. Elizabeth and four of her children, Sarah, Elizabeth Jr, Daniel, and her two-week-old daughter, were taken from her home in Dover, New Hampshire on August 27, 1724. They were held captive by Native Americans until early 1725. Two of her six children, Caleb and Ebenezer, were killed during the capture. The first was killed to intimidate them and the other because he would not be quiet, and the Indians were afraid they would be discovered.

Their journey from New Hampshire to Canada was difficult especially because Elizabeth had given birth two weeks beforehand. The lack of nourishment and clothing resulted in inadequate milk production; she therefore had a hard time feeding her baby. The youngest barely made it to the camps where the Native American women showed Hanson how to make a nut and corn infant formula milk that saved the baby's life. Journalist Avery Yale Kamila wrote that Hanson's account pre-dates the development of packaged infant formula and does show the Wabanaki tribes "had been nourishing their infants with a plant-based food for hundreds, if not thousands, of years."

The second eldest, Sarah Hanson, was separated from her mother and taken to a different group. Her third daughter, Elizabeth, and her female servant were taken shortly after, which left Elizabeth with her son Daniel and newborn baby daughter.

After enduring abuse from her captors and master, she was detained by the French and held for ransom in Canada. The French people that saved her were Jesuits, not Quakers like herself. A Catholic priest baptized her youngest daughter. They declared her name to be Mary Ann Frossways and gave her back to Elizabeth. Her husband John Hanson was able to retrieve Elizabeth, Daniel, and Mary Ann from Port Royal, Canada in 1725. He freed them by paying their ransom to the Native Americans and French. Due to the trade agreement between the French and Native Americans, Sarah married Jean Baptiste Sabourin to escape captivity and she decided to remain in Canada apart from her family. John Hanson attempted to go back to retrieve Sarah once more in 1725 but perished along the way to Canada in Crown Point, New York.

== Her captivity narrative ==
Elizabeth's story, God's Mercy Surmounting Man's Cruelty, was published in 1728. It was later renamed "An Account of the Captivity of Elizabeth Hanson." The 40-page booklet explored her captive experience and reflected highly on her religion. Such views allowed the use of her narrative to spread the Quaker ideals of households and the role of women. Elizabeth attributed her family's survival to "God's mercy" rather than the leniency of her Native American captors and the French who ultimately secured their freedom. She criticized the native American practices of feasting when there is food and starving when there is not instead of making the surplus last. When the mother-in-law of her Abenaki captor defended her and assuaged him from killing her, she believed it was not because of the woman's legitimate authority, but that it was God's will that she lived. Elizabeth Hanson died in Dover, New Hampshire in 1737.

Captivity narratives became a new genre of literature that was born during this period due to the overwhelming number of accounts of Native American capture. The first edition of her captivity narrative was published without a title page in The Pennsylvania Gazette in December 1728. Samuel Keimer released an edited copy later in the same year. The next depiction of Elizabeth's captivity An Account of the Captivity of Elizabeth Hanson, which was published in 1760, may have been falsely attributed to Samuel Bownas, a Quaker and friend of Elizabeth's. Bownas expressly says that he first saw this narrative in Dublin. These many different edits evolved from the actual account of a woman's capture and rescue to a story revolving around the social parameters of women in early colonial New England. These versions were distributed to influence the behavioral standards for Quaker women in the new colonies.
