= John Williams (New England minister) =

New England Puritan minister

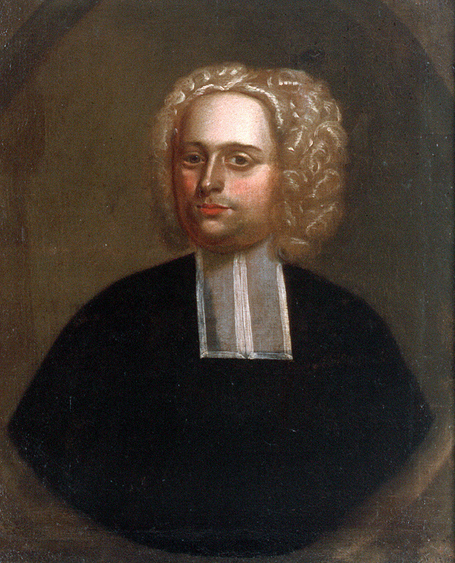
Portrait believed to be of John Williams, c. 1707

John Williams (10 December 1664 – 12 June 1729) was a New England Puritan minister who was the noted pastor of Deerfield from 1688 to his death. He and most of his family were taken captive in the Raid on Deerfield in 1704 during Queen Anne's War. He was held by the French in Montreal for more than two years, who wanted a high-ranking French pirate in exchange. After being released in late 1706, Williams became even more notable for The Redeemed Captive (1707), his account of his captivity. It became a well-known work in the genre of captivity narratives.

Four of his five surviving children were also released in 1706 and ultimately returned to Deerfield. But his youngest daughter Eunice, seven when captured, had been adopted by a Mohawk family at Kahnawake and became thoroughly assimilated. The French would not take by force captives adopted by their Mohawk allies. She married a Mohawk man and had three children with him.

Williams was a central voice in the smallpox inoculation controversy of 1721. He was an uncle of the notable pastor and theologian Jonathan Edwards.

== Early life, education and marriage ==
John Williams was born in Roxbury, Massachusetts Bay Colony in 1664, the son of Samuel Williams (1632–98) and Theoda Park (1637–1718). His grandfather Robert had immigrated there from England with his family about 1638. John had local schooling. Later he attended Harvard College, where he graduated in 1683.

His marriage to Eunice Mather connected him to some of the leading clergy in the colony. Daughter of Eleazer and Esther Mather, she was a niece of Rev Increase Mather and a cousin of Rev. Cotton Mather. She was also related to Rev. John Cotton.

== Career ==
Williams was ordained to the ministry in 1688, and settled as the first pastor in Deerfield. The frontier town in western Massachusetts was one of several on the upper Connecticut River; they were vulnerable to the attacks of French forces and their Native American allies from New France and northern New England. There was no settled border between the villages of these two colonies.

The local Pocumtuc in the Connecticut Valley had resisted the colonists' encroachment on their hunting grounds and agricultural land. In the early 18th century, French and English national competition resulted in frequent raids between New England and New France, with each colonial power allying with various Native American tribes or First Nations to enlarge their fighting forces.

=== Frontier warfare ===
In 1702, with the outbreak of Queen Anne's War, New England colonists had taken prisoner a successful French privateer, Pierre Maisonnat dit Baptiste. To gain his return, the French governor of Canada planned to raid Deerfield and capture a prisoner of equal value to exchange. In this period, raids took place by people on both sides, and frontier villages were vulnerable.

The French depended on their First Nations allies in this raid: Mohawk of the Haudenosaunee, many from Kahnawake; Wendat (Huron) from the mission village of Lorette, also in Quebec; Abenaki from northeast New England, and some Pocumtuc. They intended to take more captives to use in the ransom trade, exchanges, etc. This is now called the Raid on Deerfield. The raiders captured Williams, minister of the village, and a prominent leader in the community and colony, and more than 100 other English settlers.

On the night of 28 February 1704, approximately 300 French and Indian soldiers took 109 residents captive, besides killing a total of 56 men, women and children, including two of Williams' children (six-year-old son John Jr., and six-week-old daughter Jerushah) and his African slave Parthena. The raiding party led the Williams' and other families on a march and water travel over 300 miles (480 km) of winter landscape to Canada. En route to Quebec, a Mohawk killed Williams' wife Eunice after she fell while trying to cross a creek, and Frank, another African slave. They killed others, mostly the vulnerable older and youngest people who could not keep up. But they also showed compassion; in his memoir, Williams noted that an Indian had carried his young daughter Eunice when she got tired. Some captives died along the way. Williams remained steadfast and encouraged the other captives with prayer and Scripture along their journey to Quebec. The large party had seven weeks of hard overland travel to reach Fort Chambly at the mouth of the Richelieu River, where it flows into the St. Lawrence River in what is now Quebec.

=== Captivity and release ===
While captive, Williams recorded his impressions of French colonial life in New France. Private families treated him courteously; Jesuit missionaries included him at their table for meals, and he was often given comfortable lodgings, including a feather bed. Upon Pierre Maisonnat's release by Boston authorities, Williams was released by Quebec Governor Philippe de Rigaud Vaudreuil and returned to Boston on 21 November 1706, along with about 60 other captives. Among them were four of his children. This was the second large group of captives to be released by the French.

When his exchange was finally arranged in late 1706, Williams was forced to leave in Quebec his daughter Eunice, then ten years old, who had been adopted by a Mohawk family in Kahnawake, a Jesuit mission village south of Montreal. She took the place of their child who had died from smallpox. Eunice became thoroughly assimilated, learning the Mohawk language and ways. Because the French colonial government depended on their alliance with the Mohawk, they would not take children away by force whom the Indians had adopted. Eunice was baptized as a Catholic in 1710, when she took the name Marguerite. She was also given a Mohawk name as a child. When she became an adult, she was given the Mohawk name Kanenstenhawi to mark the passage. At age 16, Kanenstenhawi married François-Xavier Arosen, a Mohawk man of 25. They had three children together.

After celebrations in Boston and giving a sermon there in December 1706, Williams returned to Deerfield. While four of his children had also been freed from captivity, for a time he continued arrangements for having them live with family until the new family house was completed by the community. Stephen lived with an uncle in Roxbury, where he attended school; Samuel lived with another uncle in Charlestown; and Esther lived with Stoddard relatives in Northampton.

In the winter of 1706/1707, Williams wrote a narrative of his captivity called The Redeemed Captive (Boston, spring 1707). It was extremely popular because of his standing in the colony and the widely known account of the numerous captives having been taken from Deerfield. Being printed in several editions, Williams's account was one of the more well-known of the numerous Indian captivity narratives published during the colonial period. The 19th-century author James Fenimore Cooper drew on this account as inspiration for his novel, The Last of the Mohicans (1826).

In summer 1707 Williams's new house was completed. In September of that year, he remarried to Abigail Bissell, a widow from Connecticut and first cousin to his late wife through the Stoddard family. At that time, he collected his children from varied locations in Massachusetts and had them return to Deerfield.

Williams lived and worked in Deerfield until his death in 1729. He made efforts to keep in touch with Eunice and continued to try to persuade her to return to Massachusetts, as did her brother Stephen, who followed his father into the ministry. She did not return until after her father's death.

Williams was a minister of the favored New England Puritans in the same era as Samuel Willard, Increase Mather, Cotton Mather, Edward Taylor, and Solomon Stoddard. He died shortly before the rise of the Great Awakening. He published several sermons.

== Inoculation controversy ==
In 1721 a smallpox epidemic broke out in Boston. Prominent ministers such as Increase Mather and his son, Cotton Mather, advocated the use of inoculations. Rev. Williams emerged as one of their strongest opponents, publishing, with James Franklin (Benjamin's brother), a treatise against the Mathers entitled "Several arguments proving, that inoculating the small pox is not contained in the law of physick, either natural or divine, and therefore unlawful".

== Death ==
Williams died in Deerfield in 1729. His son Stephen became a minister and continued to live there.

It was not until 1741 that Eunice Williams and her husband went to Massachusetts for the first time, persuaded by her brother Stephen's efforts to keep in touch. She made two other visits, including an extended one with her children, but lived in Kahnawake for the rest of her life. The last known survivor of the raid, Eunice Williams, also known by her Mohawk and married name as Marguerite Kanenstenhawi Arosen, died on 26 November 1785.
