= Eunice Kanenstenhawi Williams =

Native American captive

- Born: 17 September 1696; Deerfield, Massachusetts
- Died: 26 November 1785 (aged 89); Kahnawake, Quebec

Eunice Williams, also known as Marguerite Kanenstenhawi Arosen, (17 September 1696 – 26 November 1785) was an English colonist taken captive by French and Mohawk warriors from Deerfield, Massachusetts, in 1704. Taken to Canada with more than 100 other captives, the seven-year-old girl was adopted by a recently converted Mohawk family at Kahnawake and fully assimilated into Mohawk society. She was baptized as the Catholic "Marguerite" and renamed A'ongonte, meaning "she who has been planted as an ash tree." She eventually married a Mohawk man, François-Xavier Arosen, having several children and remaining with the Mohawk for the rest of her life. While choosing not to return to her natal family, she, along with her children, repeatedly made the trek to Deerfield to visit with her Puritan siblings over the course of her life. Her father, Rev. John Williams, and her brother Samuel made numerous efforts to ransom her to no avail. Moreover, they failed to persuade her to return to Massachusetts and her birth family.

== Early life and education ==
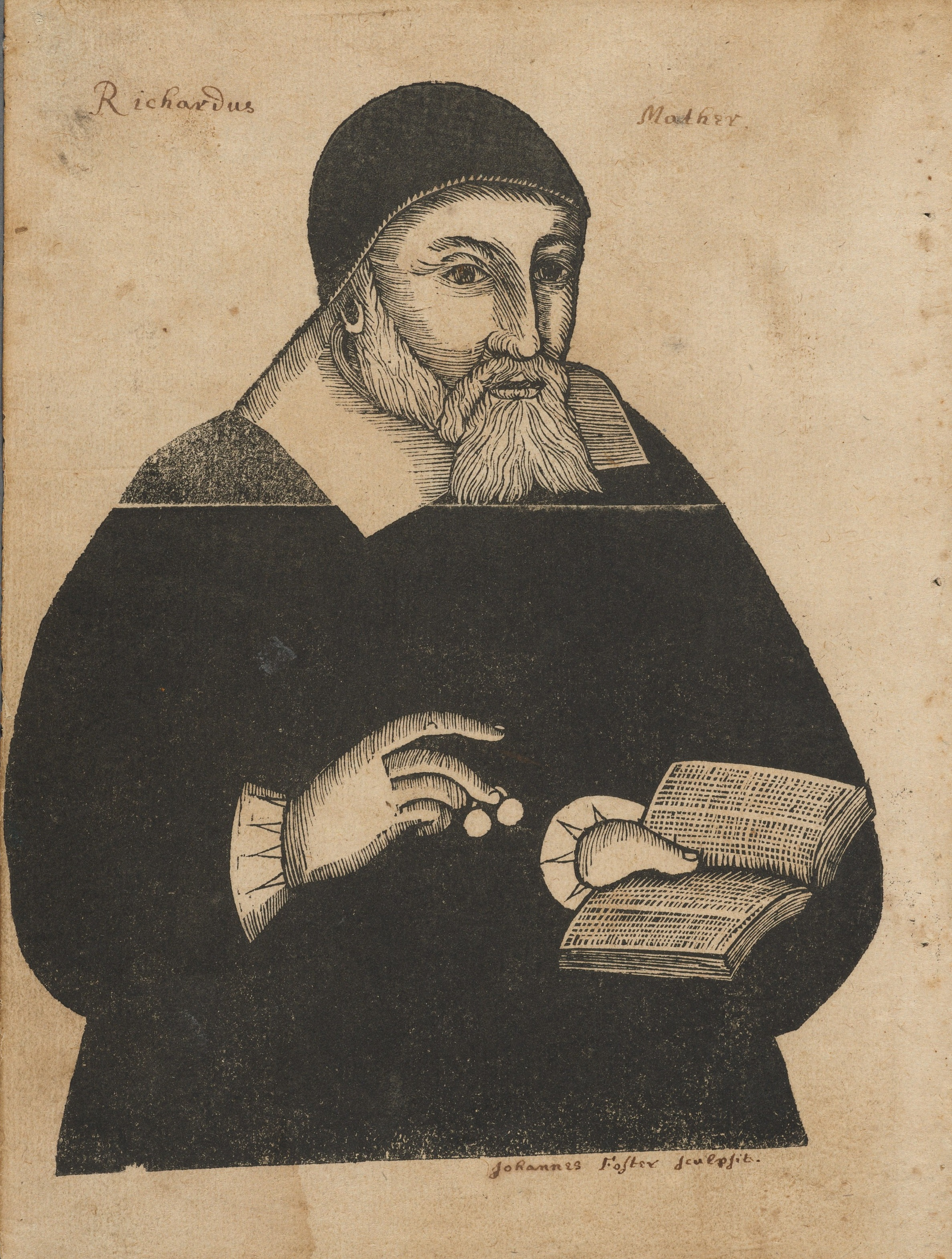
Eunice's great-grandfather Rev. Richard Mather 1675.

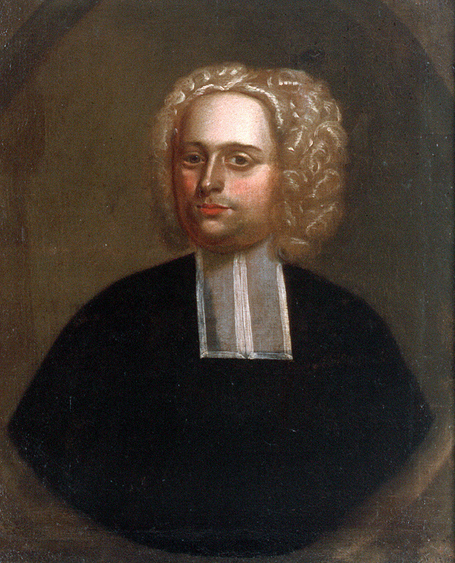
Portrait believed to be of John Williams, c. 1707

Eunice Williams was born on 17 September 1696, the daughter of the Puritan minister John Williams and his wife, Eunice Mather Williams. On 29 February 1704, the Williams' home was attacked during a raid on the settlement led by French and allied Abenaki and Mohawk fighters. Later called the Deerfield Massacre, the event was part of a series of raids and conflicts between the French and English and their Indigenous allies during Queen Anne's War in the early 18th century.

The attackers killed numerous settlers in their houses, including Eunice's younger brother John Williams, Jr. and six-week-old sister Jerusha. They took captive more than 100 settlers, including 7-year-old Eunice, her parents, and four of her siblings. The captives were taken on a strenuous march northward. The next day, a Mohawk warrior killed her mother after she fell while crossing the icy waters of the Green River. Other children and elderly captives were also killed if they could not keep up with the large party.

Eunice and the surviving members of her family reached Fort Chambly in Quebec six weeks later. From there, the Mohawks took her to Kahnawake, a Catholic Mohawk settlement south of Montreal across the St. Lawrence River. A woman who had recently lost her daughter in a smallpox epidemic soon adopted her. Eunice was given the symbolic name Waongote, meaning "one who is planted like an Ashe", and was instructed in the Mohawk language and customs, and catechized in the Roman Catholic religion. When she converted to Catholicism, she was baptized Marguerite.

When the survivors of Deerfield learned their captured relatives and neighbors were in Quebec, they began negotiations through various intermediaries to ransom them. During these years, Rev. Williams was allowed to meet with Eunice on two occasions; both times, he responded to her requests for guidance by telling her to recite the Puritan Catechism.

== Later life ==
When John Williams was ransomed and freed about three years later, he wanted to have Eunice reunited with him. The French told an intermediary it was impossible because the Mohawks who adopted her "would as soon part with their hearts as the child." The French government would not generally interfere when the Mohawk adopted captives, even if they were European. He managed to retrieve his other children, (Note: Eunice's siblings who survived the raid and trek to Canada with her were Samuel (15), Esther (13), Stephen (9), and Warham (4). The Williams' eldest child, Eleazer (16), was away studying for the ministry and not living at Deerfield at the time of the raid. The other Williams children were eventually returned to New England.) who returned to live in Massachusetts.

Eunice became fully assimilated into Mohawk culture, and at 16 married a 25-year-old Mohawk man, François-Xavier Arosen. They had three children together. Nonetheless, Rev. Williams, succeeded by his son Stephen, continued through the years to try to ransom and later persuade Eunice to rejoin her New England family.

Eunice, called Kanenstenhawi ("She who brings corn") as an adult Mohawk, eventually visited New England in 1741, after her father had died. Her brother Stephen had kept in touch with her. When Eunice and her husband went to Massachusetts, it was with a guide and interpreter, as they spoke only Mohawk and French. She made two more visits to her Williams family, bringing her children with her and one year staying for an extended period through the winter.
