= Tantamous =

Nipmuc leader

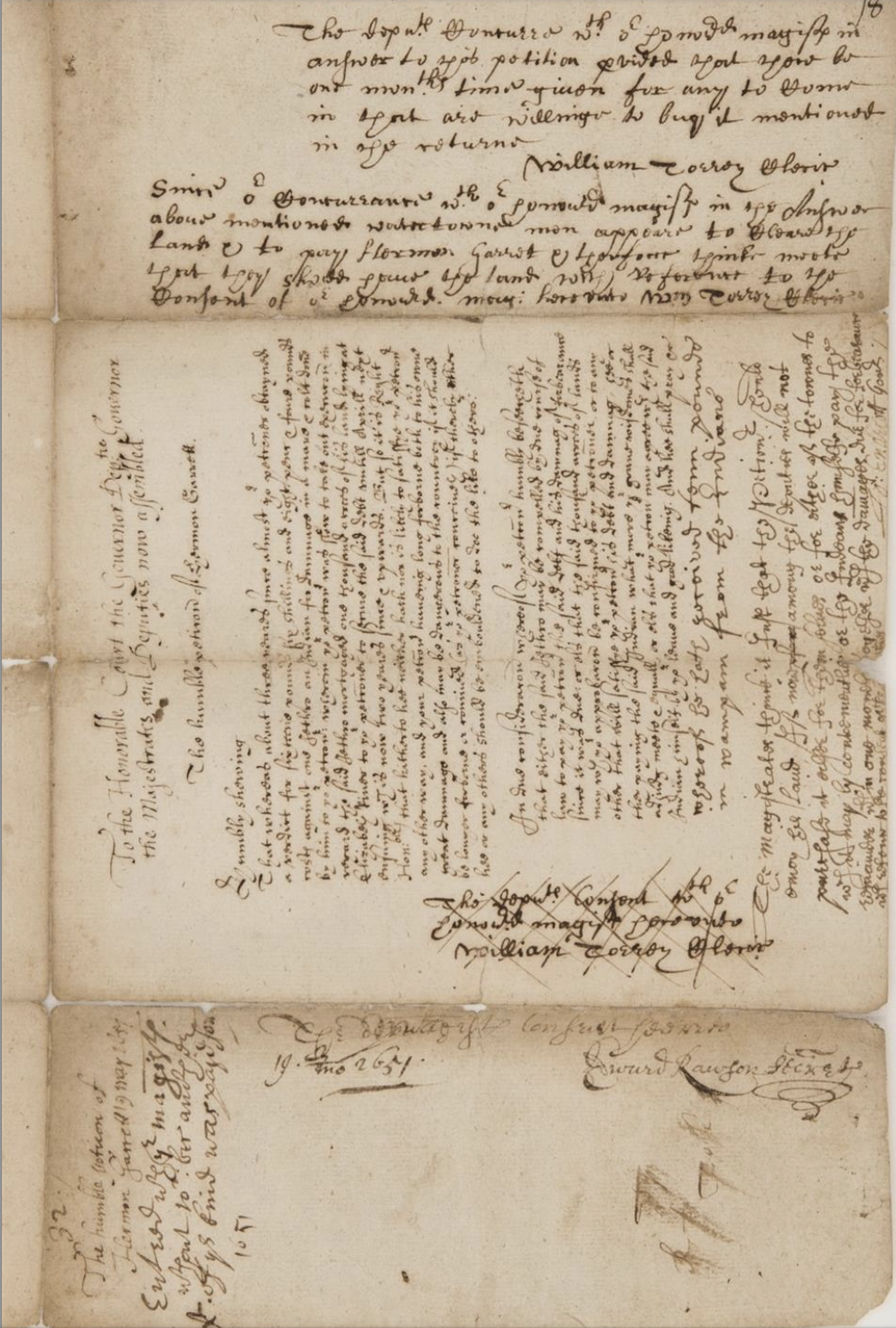
Petition by Harmon Garrett for Jethro's land along the Elizabeth River (Assabet) near what is now Maynard, Massachusetts

Tantamous (also known as Old Jethro or John Jethro) (c. 1580–1676) was a well-known Native American Nipmuc leader in seventeenth century Massachusetts. Tantamous was a powwow (healer and spiritual leader) who lived near the Assabet River, later in Nobscot (now Framingham). Tantamous "...may have gotten his English name for his good advice."

== Early life ==
According to one source "[i]n his earlier years it is supposed [Tantamous] lived at Isabaeth, the country about the Assabet River, now Maynard." Around 1635 Tantamous and/or his son Peter Jethro was present with a group of Native Americans to witness the sale of what is now downtown Concord to local colonists. In 1651, Tantamous transferred land in what is now Maynard to Herman Garrett, a resident of Concord, by defaulting on a mortgaged mare and colt. In 1659, John Smith of Charlestown unsuccessfully requested the Massachusetts General Court to deed him Tantamous' land near Sudbury as payment for a debt. He was recorded as having two illegitimate children by 1663, but it is not entirely clear if this is the same Jethro. Later in life, Tantamous and twelve of his family members lived on the northwest side of what is now named Nobscot Hill, located in Framingham and Sudbury.

== King Philips's War and death ==
Despite living amongst the praying Indians associated with John Eliot, Tantamous did not join their religion. In 1675, Tantamous and ten other Indians were falsely accused of committing a murder in the Lancaster Raid after allegedly falling under suspicion due to their "singing, dancing, and having much powder and many bullets and slugs hid in their baskets," but they were acquitted when the true murderer, Monoco, a Nashaway, was discovered, and Peter Jethro actually communicated with the captors of Mary Rowlandson to obtain her release. According to Sudbury pastor, Edmund Browne, "It was the speech of Indian Jethro, that he would be on the strongest side. I beleeve he spake the truth, and the resolution of most of our Indians." In 1675, Tantamous received thirty lashes for abusive speeches to Rev. Samuel Willard at his house in Groton.

During King Philip's War, the government ordered Tantamous and his family to Deer Island, but Tantamous eventually escaped from Deer Island; however his son, Peter, alerted the authorities (with alleged assurances that his family would not be harmed) of his father's whereabouts. On September 9, 1676, Tantamous contacted Richard Waldron through two women regarding bringing Canonicus, the Narragansett leader, to the colonial government, but Tantamous was captured at Cochecho (Dover, New Hampshire) and executed on September 26, 1676, on the Boston Common after being marched through the streets of Boston with a noose on his neck on the way to the Great Elm Tree. In his history of the war, Increase Mather referred to the incident, stating, "That abominable Indian Peter Jethro betrayed his own Father, and other Indians of his special acquaintance, unto Death." More recent historians suggest that Peter may have actually been working to turn in only John Monoco, the perpetrator of the Lancaster raid out of a sense of justice, and Monoco and Old Jethro may have intended to surrender peacefully in return for offering Canonicus, the Narragansett leader in exchange for their lives. The remainder of Tantamous' family, other than Peter, were sold into slavery.

In 1683, several Indians, including Rev. Daniel Takawombait signed a letter to John Eliot requesting that church services in the Natick Praying town continue in the Nipmuc language rather than English, and one of the signatories was "Olt Jetro," so Peter Jethro may have used his father's name after his death or another Indian may have adopted it as was the practice among other New England Indian leaders of that era.

== Legacy ==
Remnants of Tantamous' home, orchard, and farm fields in Framingham and Sudbury on Nobscot Hill could still be seen centuries after his death, and remnants of his collapsed cave, near Jethro's Table (Tantamount Lookout), can still be seen today. Tantamous' name is memorialized in Tantamouse Trail in Sudbury and Jethro Street in Maynard, and the Tantamous Lodge of the Boy Scouts. Part of Tantamous' land on Nobscot Hill is now located within the Nobscot Boy Scout Reservation where there is a Jethro Trail and Tantamous Hill.

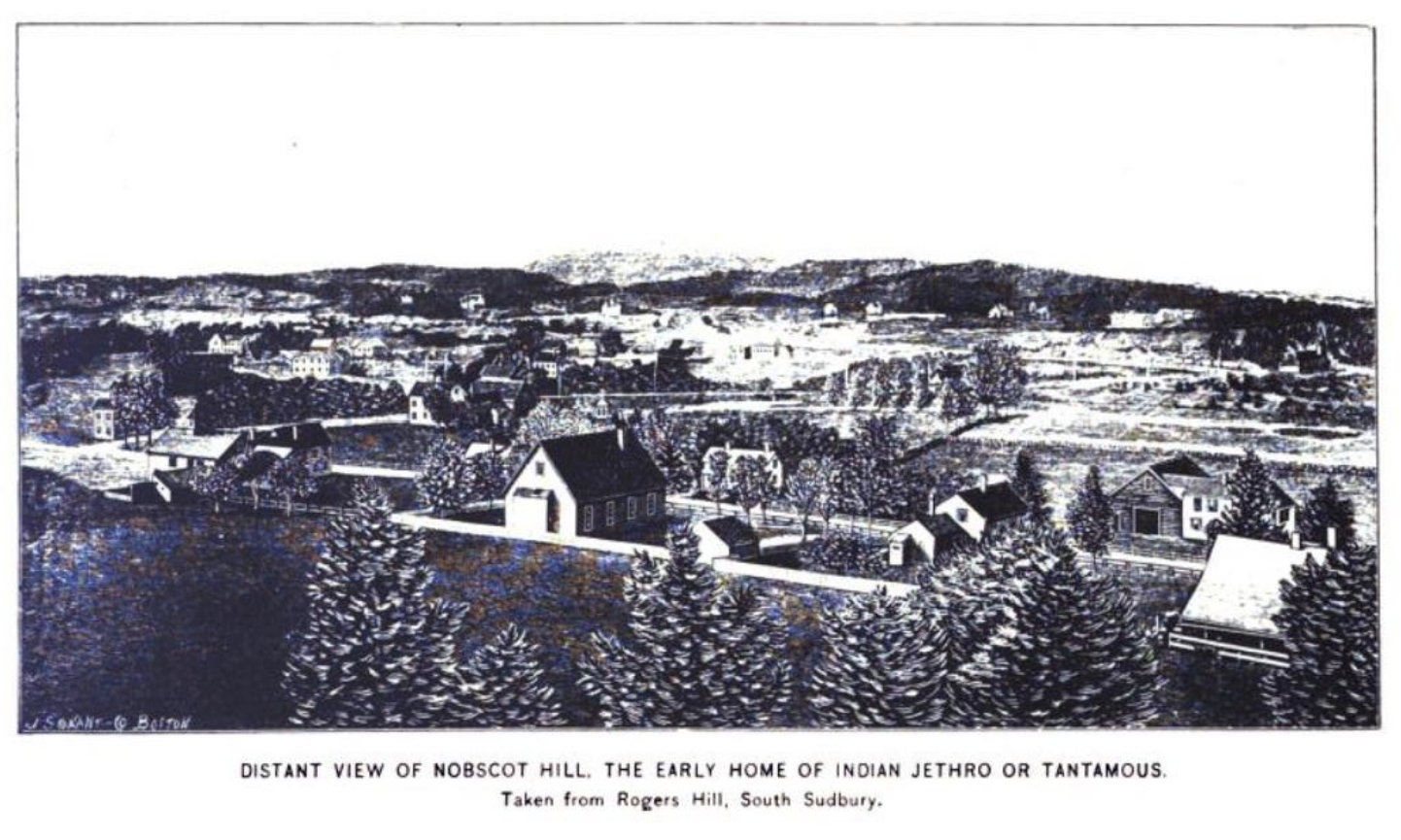
View of the Nobscot home of Tantamous

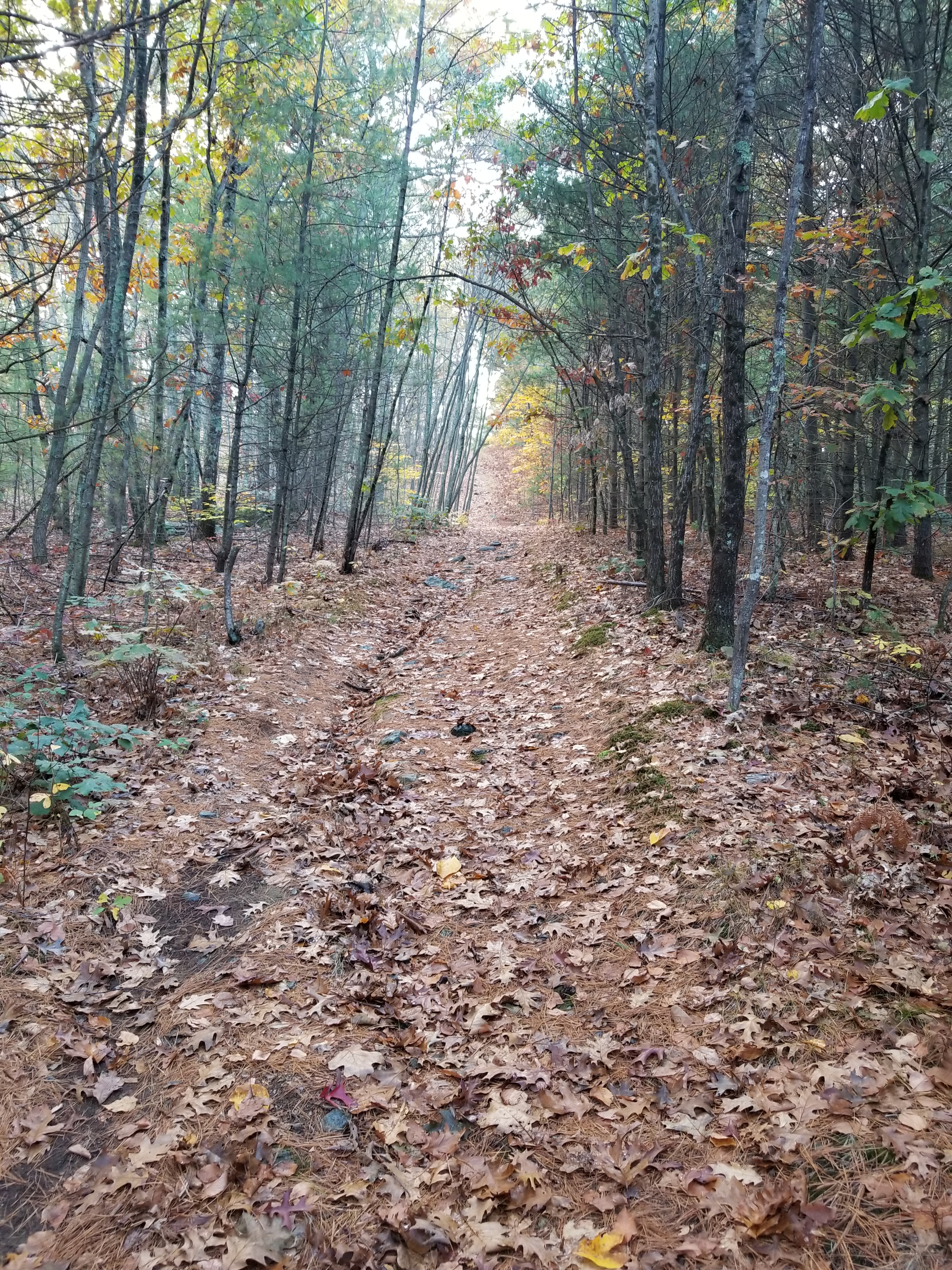
Tantamous Hill adjacent to Nobscot Hill in Nobscot BSA Reservation, off Ellis Land Trail

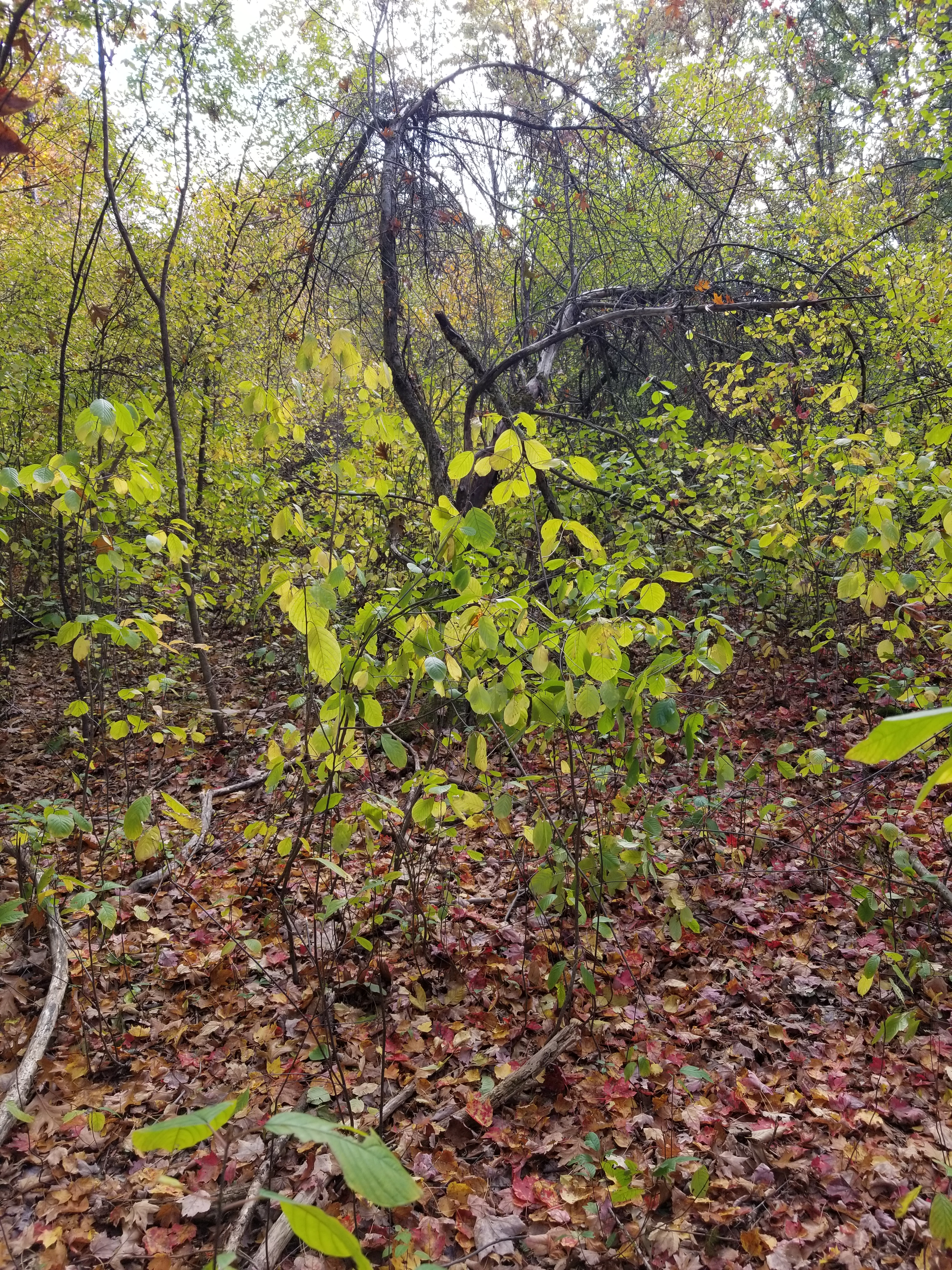
Jethro's Orchard remnants (replanted by Henry Ford) on side of Nobscot Hill off Brimstone Lane Nobscot Conservation Land entrance

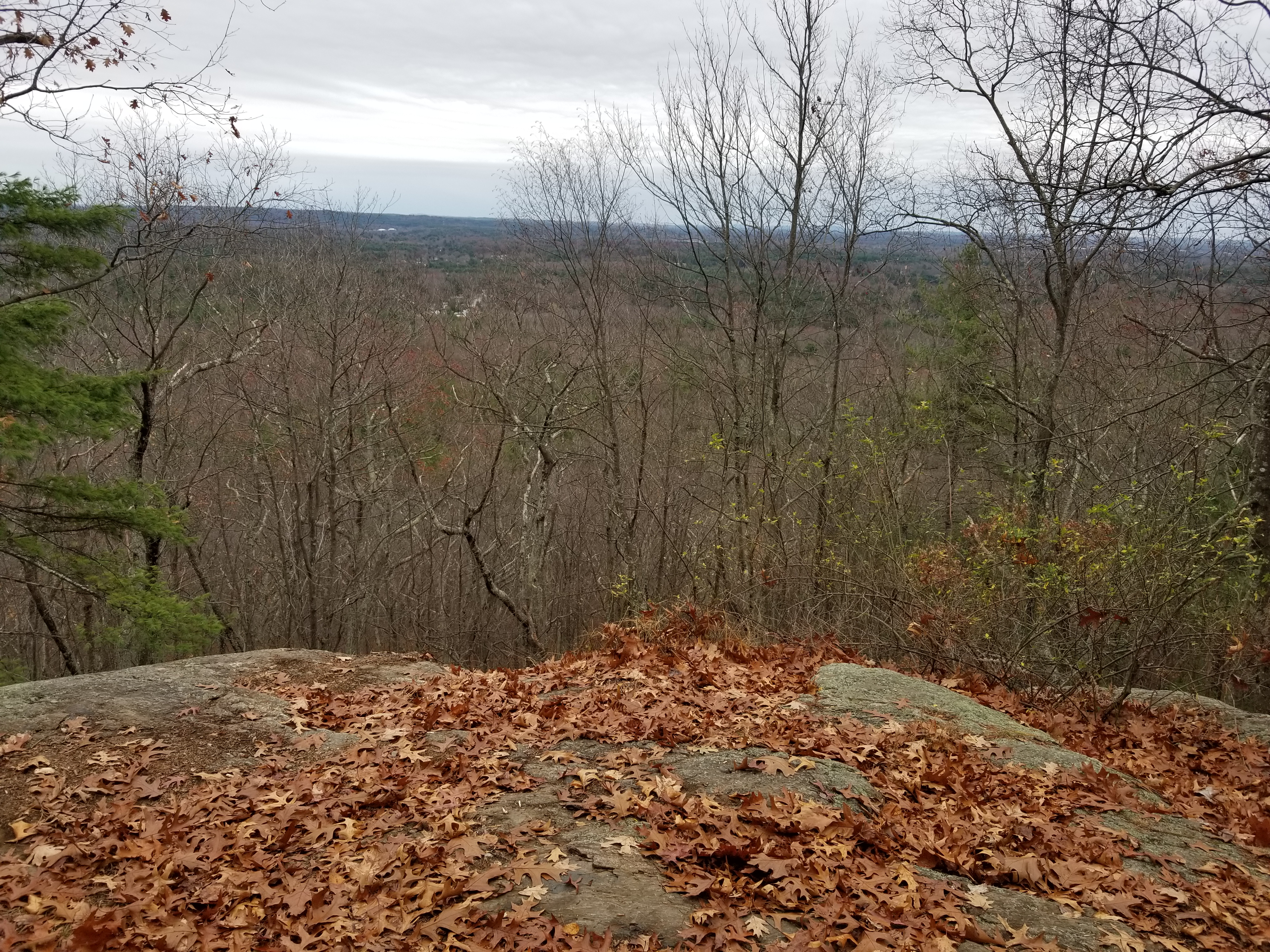
"Jethro's Table" (Tantamount Lookout) viewing Ledge one minute southeast of Fire Tower on summit of Nobscot

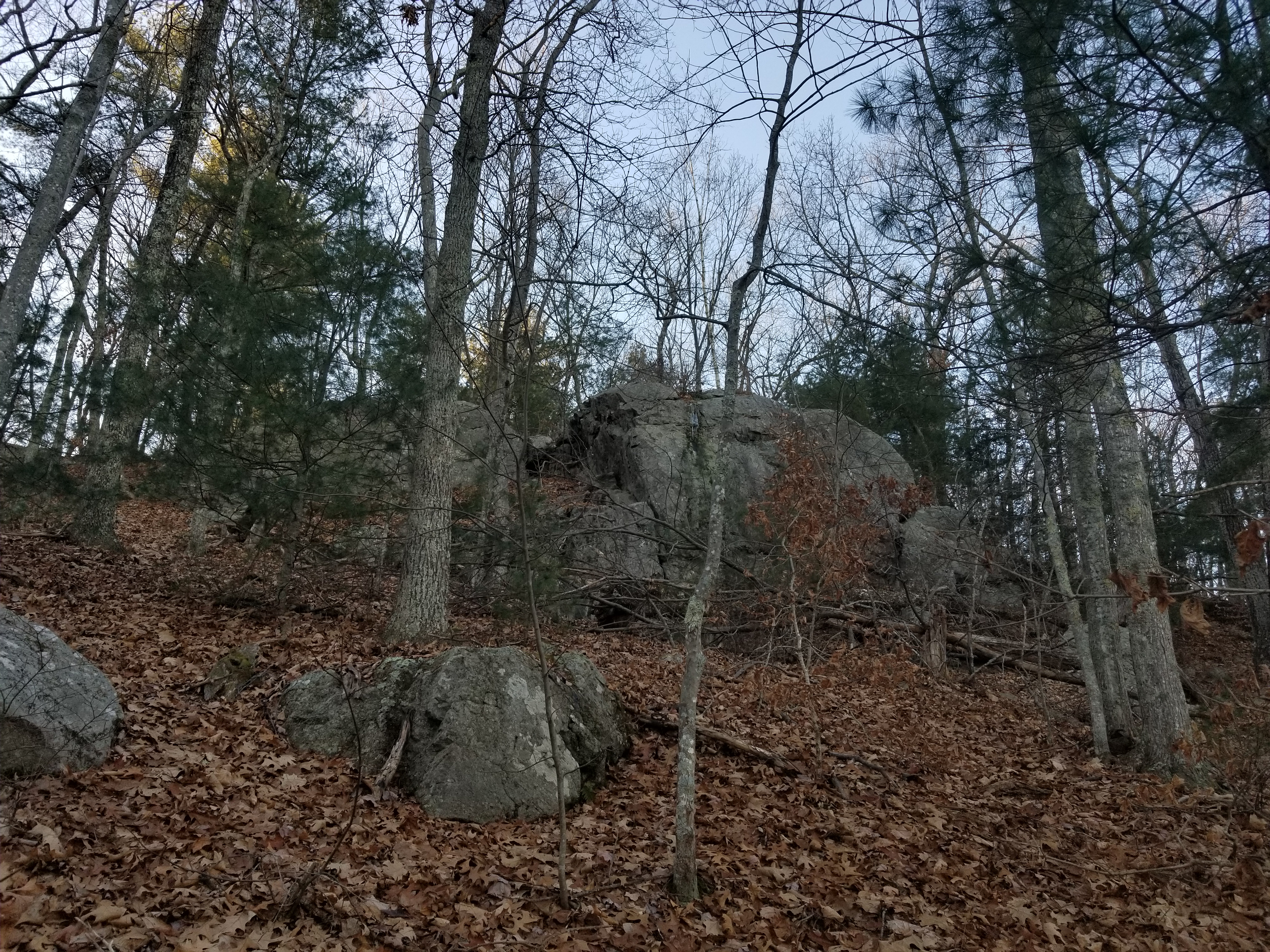
"Jethro's Table" (Tantamount Lookout) with supposed collapsed remains of his cave
