= Peter Jethro =

Peter Jethro (also known as Jethro or Animatohu or Hantomush) (c. 1614 – c. 1688) was an early Native American (Nipmuc) scribe, translator, minister, land proprietor, and Praying Indian affiliated for a period with John Eliot in the praying town of Natick, Massachusetts.

== Early life ==
Peter Jethro was born in approximately 1614 and was the son of the Nipmuc medicine man Tantamous (also known as "Old Jethro"), although some early records and histories confuse the father and son. Peter Jethro stated that he was "one of the ancient native hereditary Indian proprietors of" Assabet (near what is now Maynard, Massachusetts). By 1635 Peter Jethro resided in Nashobah (near Nagog Pond on the modern day boundary of Littleton and Acton) near Concord and was present with a group of Native Americans to witness the sale of what is now downtown Concord to local colonists. By around 1650 Peter Jethro moved to the praying town of Natick near where his father resided on Nobscot Hill, and while in Natick Peter Jethro studied under John Eliot who stated that "Jethro, after he had confest Christ and was baptized, was sent to preach Christ to" "[p]eople (sundry of them) dwelling at Panatuket-Fort." In 1674 Daniel Gookin, superintendent of the Praying Indians, vouched for Peter Jethro as a "grave and pious Indian" and commissioned him to work as a missionary minister in Nashaway (Lancaster) and Weshakim (Sterling). Using his knowledge of English and local Algonquin dialects, Peter Jethro served as a translator and scribe for various land transactions between settlers and Native Americans in Massachusetts. In 1665 he was part of a group of Indians that transferred Quinsigamoge Pond to the settlers.

== King Philip's War ==
In August 1675 Peter's father, Tantamous, and ten other Indians were falsely accused of committing a murder in the first Lancaster attack after allegedly falling under suspicion due to their "singing, dancing, and having much powder and many bullets and slugs hid in their baskets," but they were acquitted when the true murderer, Monoco, a Nashaway, was discovered. King Philip purportedly captured Peter Jethro at the outbreak of King Philip's War, and Jethro accompanied the Indians against the English during their expedition on the Connecticut River and was present at Battle on Beer's Plain in Northfield in September 1675 where he freed an English captive. Peter Jethro later communicated with the captors of Mary Rowlandson, a captive taken during the February 1676 Lancaster raid, to obtain her release. Peter eventually escaped and turned himself in to the English authorities in response to an offer of a pardon for any Indian who did so. Pardoning Jethro in return for his service was criticized strongly by Rev. Edmund Brown of Sudbury.

During King Philip's War, the government ordered Peter's father, Tantamous, and his family to Deer Island, but Tantamous escaped, and Peter alerted the authorities (with alleged assurances that his family would not be harmed) of his father's whereabouts, but his father was captured at Cochecho (Dover, New Hampshire) and executed on the Boston Common in 1676) In his history of the war, Increase Mather referred to the incident, stating, "That abominable Indian Peter Jethro betrayed his own Father, and other Indians of his special acquaintance, unto Death." More recent historians suggest that Peter may have actually been working to turn in only John Monoco, the perpetrator of the Lancaster raid, out of a sense of justice, and Monoco and Old Jethro may have intended to surrender peacefully in return for offering Canonicus, the Narragansett leader, in exchange for their lives. On September 2, 1676 Richard Waldron wrote a letter to Daniel Gookin stating that he never promised amnesty for the Indians which Peter brought in, but only to let the governor know of his service if he helped the colony.

In 1677 Rev. Thomas Cobbett wrote an account of the War stating that "Capt. John Jerthoag a Nipmk Sagamor came in and some with him, and presently after fetched in old Matonas and his son, 120 more." It is unclear if "Jerthoag" is in reference to Peter or possibly another Jethro relative, but it has been interpreted as meaning a member of the "Jethro" family. Similarly, William Hubbard wrote about Peter Jethro's assistance to the colony stating that "young Jethro brought in 40 at one time."

== Later life advocating for Native American rights ==
Between 1681 and 1685 Jethro (sometimes referring to himself as "Old Jethro") signed documents with other Nipmucs protesting the sale of tribal lands including near what is now Marlborough, Massachusetts and elsewhere in "Nipmuc country" by various parties who acted without authority including Waban, Great James, and John Wampas. In 1683 several Indians, including Rev. Daniel Takawombait signed a letter to John Eliot requesting that church services in the Natick Praying town continue in the Nipmuc language rather than English, and one of the signatories was "Olt Jetro," so Peter Jethro or another relative may have used his father's name after his death or may have adopted it as was the practice with other deceased Indians in that era. Also, in 1683 Peter Jethro was living with Jonathan Ting of Dunstable, Massachusetts, and transferred land north of Mount Wachusett to Ting, which Jethro had received from his Uncle Jeffrey of Waymessitt, and Jethro stated that he had no children. In 1684 Peter Jethro confirmed land transfers of family land in Sudbury to colonists, and he deeded land in what is now Maynard to settlers there, and the Sudbury transfer was witnessed by Rev. Daniel Takawombait. He also signed documentation in 1684 confirming early land transfers including the Concord purchase. Jethro was involved in land transfers in as far away as what is now Vermont. According to one source, "[i]n the Fall of 1688, Peter Jethro and three other Indians went on an excursion to the upper valley of the Connecticut River, the object of which is not stated. No later notice of him has been found" however a Native American referred to as "Jethro, the Indian" witnessed the death of John Wells near the Connecticut River in Connecticut in 1695.
