= Maigret and the Millionaires =

1958 detective novel by Georges Simenon

Maigret and the Millionaires (French: Maigret Voyage) is a 1958 detective novel by the Belgian writer Georges Simenon featuring Jules Maigret of the French Judicial police. It was written in Épalinges, Switzerland in August 1957 and first published by Presses de la Cité in 1958. The 51st in the series, it was first translated into English by Jean Stewart in 1974 and in 2018 (under the title Maigret Travels ) by Howard Curtis.

== Synopsis ==
English multimillionaire Colonel David Ward has been found drowned in his bathtub at the ritzy Hôtel George-V, the bruises on his shoulders signs of murder. Only the night before his mistress, the flighty Italian countess and divorcée Louise Paverini, had attempted suicide in her suite and been taken to the American Hospital in Neuilly-sur-Seine. (They had been waiting for his second divorce to be finalized, but their plans had gone awry.) Inspector Maigret somewhat grudgingly joins the jet set, following her trail from Orly to Monte Carlo in Monoco to the French Riviera, and finally to Lausanne, Switzerland, exercising the utmust discretion all the while, for David Ward had been a very important man. Matters are complicated by past marriages, two children, and the general milieau of the very rich, but ultimately simplified by a time-limited inheritance.

== Adaptations ==
=== Television ===
- Rupert Davies (Another World), BBC, 3 December 1963
- Jean Richard, Maigret voyage, Antenne 2, 23 May 1987

== Gallery ==
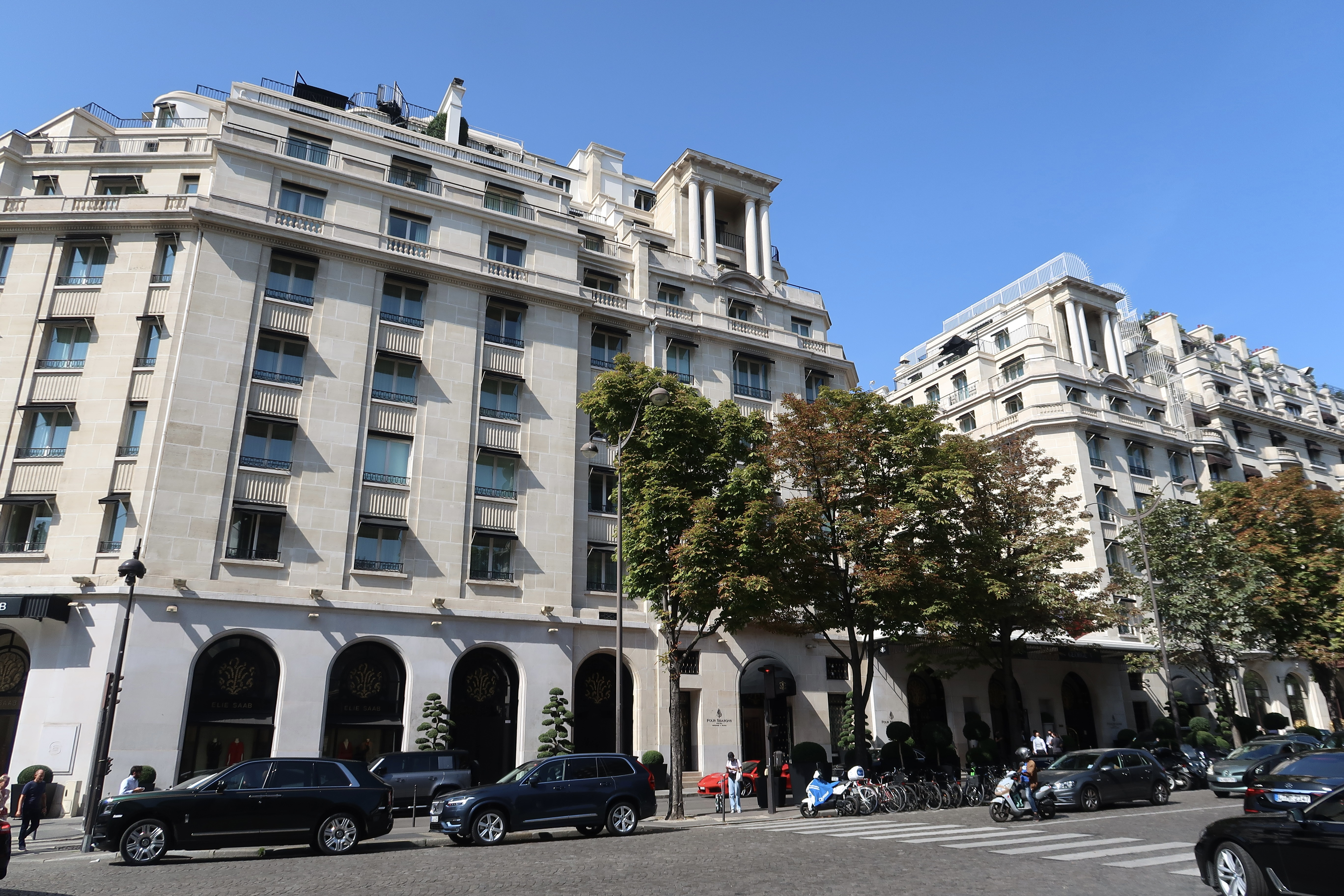
Hôtel George V

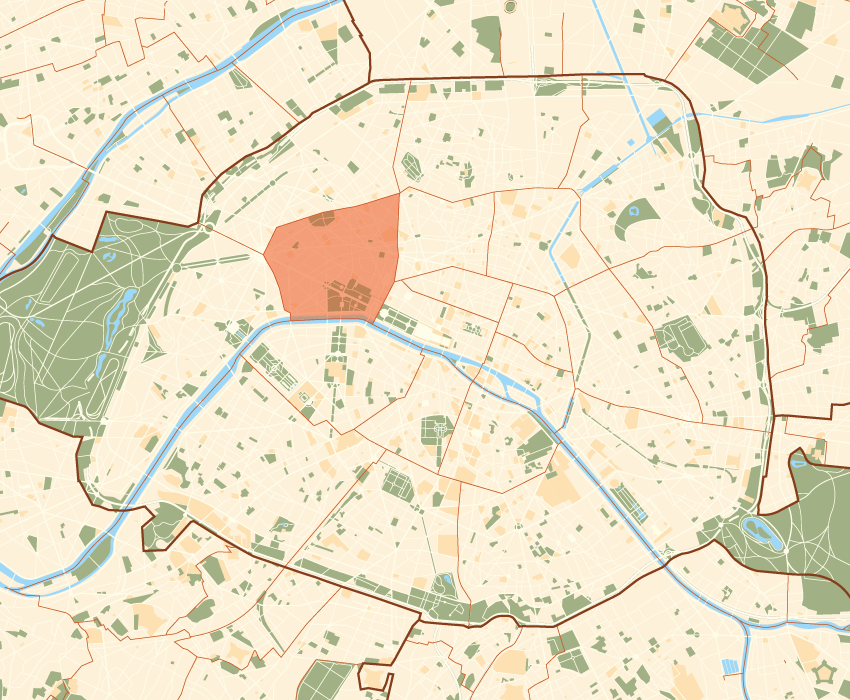
8th arrondissement

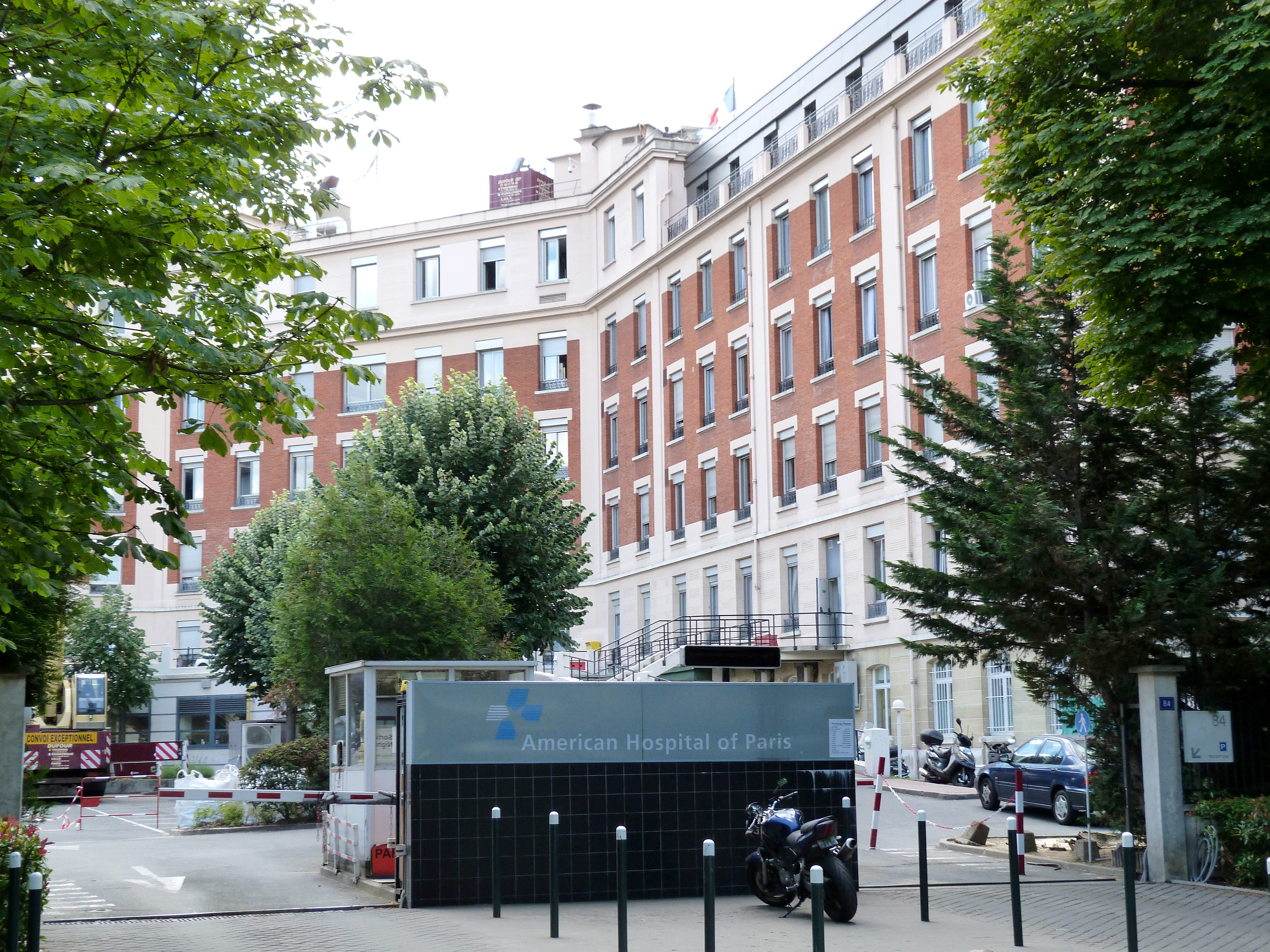
American Hospital of Paris

Neuillay sur Seine commune, an inner suburb

Orly commune, also an inner suburb of Paris

Alpes-Maritimes department, the location of Nice and the French Riviera

The semi-enclave and micro-state Monaco

Switzerland

== See also ==
Analyses (English & French)
