= John Hoar =

American militia leader

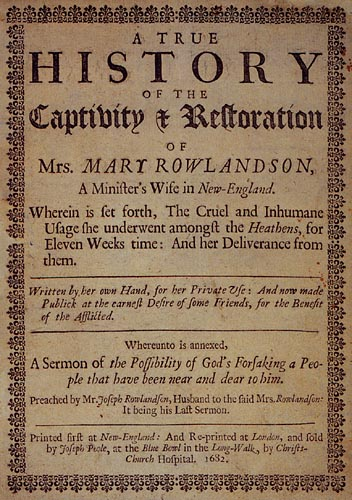
Title page of A True History of the Captivity and Restoration of Mrs. Mary Rowlandson, First edition London 1682.

John Hoar (1622 – April 2, 1704) was a militia leader and liaison with Native Americans in colonial Massachusetts during King Philip's War. He is best known for securing the release of Mary Rowlandson from Nipmuc captivity at Redemption Rock. The event was depicted in the best-selling book The Sovereignty and Goodness of God: Being a Narrative of the Captivity and Restoration of Mrs. Mary Rowlandson.

== Life ==
Coat of Arms of John Hoar

John Hoar was born in 1622 (Note: There is no recorded date for his birth, but a 1633 record of apprenticeship to his father indicates that he was eleven years old at that time.) in Gloucester, England. His widowed mother brought him to Massachusetts in or around 1641, settling in Scituate no later than 1643. (Note: The first evidence of Hoar’s settlement in Scituate is a 1643 list of men of the town bearing arms.)

In 1659, he moved to Concord. At some point during King Philip's War, he tried to give shelter to John Eliot's Praying Indians. His neighbors prevented this and took the natives to Deer Island, where they perished, but Hoar's act established his reputation as a liaison to the natives.

On February 10, 1676, Mary Rowlandson, wife of Lancaster minister Joseph Rowlandson, was taken prisoner with three of her children by a band of Nipmuc warriors. Hoar, a prominent lawyer and missionary, was requested by Rowlandson to act as the colonial representative in the negotiation for her release. Hoar departed Lancaster on April 28, 1676, with two native guides, Nepphonet and Peter Tatatiquinea to meet King Philip's War party at Wachusett Lake, located in what is now Princeton, Massachusetts. On May 2, after eleven weeks in captivity, Rowlandson was released to Hoar for a £20 ransom at the glacial stone outcropping known today as Redemption Rock. Rowlandson would go on to write a famous narrative of her experience as a captive, The Sovereignty and Goodness of God: Being a Narrative of the Captivity and Restoration of Mrs. Mary Rowlandson which became a bestseller throughout the English speaking world. It is considered to be a seminal work in the American literary genre of captivity narratives and also ranks as the first published book written by a colonial American woman.

Hoar was known to have a wife, Alice. (Note: There is no record of her last name or the date of their marriage. It has been incorrectly stated that he married an Alice Lisle, a daughter of Lord Lisle, but it was Hoar's brother, Leonard, a president of Harvard College, who had married Bridget Lisle, daughter of Alice Lisle and John Lisle. This is evidenced by a petition to Parliament regarding the estate of Lord Lisle's martyred wife, which was signed by Bridget Lisle Hoar and Bridget's sisters but not by Alice Hoar, who was living at that time.) Their children were Elizabeth, Mary, Joanna, and Daniel. He died on April 2, 1704, in Concord, Massachusetts. Hoar was the first inhabitant of the Orchard House later occupied by Louisa May Alcott.
