= Redemption Rock =

Historic site in Massachusetts, United States

Coordinates: 42°30′24.2″N 71°52′10.8″W

- Redemption Rock
- Interactive map of Redemption Rock
- Established: 1953
- Operator: The Trustees of Reservations
- Website: Redemption Rock

Redemption Rock is a colonial-era historic site in Princeton, Massachusetts. In 1676, during King Philip's War, the release of Mary Rowlandson (the wife of a Puritan minister) from her Native American captors was negotiated atop a granite ledge. The 0.25-acre (0.10 ha) parcel upon which the rock stands was acquired by the land conservation non-profit organization The Trustees of Reservations in 1953, and is open to the public.

Rowlandson would later write about her experience in A Narrative of the Captivity and Restoration of Mrs. Mary Rowlandson, considered a seminal work in the American literary genre of captivity narratives.

Redemption Rock is located off Massachusetts Route 140, near Mount Wachusett.

== Inscriptions and markers ==
The inscription on Redemption Rock reads: "Upon this rock May 2, 1676 was made the agreement for the ransom of Mrs Mary Rowlandson of Lancaster between the Indians and John Hoar of Concord. King Philip was with the Indians but refused his consent."

The official state marker at the site, placed in 1930, reads: "Upon the rock fifty feet West of this spot Mary Rowlandson wife of the first minister of Lancaster was redeemed from captivity under King Philip. The narrative of her experience is one of the classics of colonial literature."

== Recreation ==
The Midstate Trail passes by Redemption Rock. Wachusett Mountain State Reservation is 1.2 miles south along the trail. The Crow Hills in Leominster State Forest are 1.6 miles north along the trail.
