= William Okeley =

William Okeley was a Puritan who was taken into slavery in Algeria between the years 1639–44, and who wrote a captivity narrative of the 17th century. Okeley published his narrative in 1675, nearly 30 years after his escape from Algiers.

Okeley was fleeing religious persecution and was on his way to the Puritan colony of Providence Island when his boat was captured by Algerian pirates. During his time in Algiers, he served four different masters, and was forced into a variety of occupations, including childcare, working on the crew of an Algerian pirate ship, weaving, and, most importantly, running a business in the city, which was selling alcohol and other goods. Many slaves in Algiers were set loose within the city (whose walls acted as a prison) and forced to pay a monthly allowance to their masters. Many, like Okeley, thrived by trading. Eventually, Okeley and a group of his fellow slaves staged a daring escape by creating a boat with a canvas hull, smuggling it out of the city, and rowing themselves across the Mediterranean Sea to the island of Mallorca.

Unlike many Barbary slave narratives, Okeley constructed his in the form of a spiritual autobiography, and his narrative provides an important precursor to, and possible inspiration for, American Puritan captivity narratives, including the most well-known, that of Mary Rowlandson, who was captured by Native Americans in colonial Massachusetts during King Philip's War.

== Providence Island and colonization ==
Providence Island is a small island located in the West Indies. The island promised land for Puritans wanting to leave New England under the reign of King Charles I. New England was overpopulated and restricted Puritan practices due to lingering hostility from other Catholic . The land was beneficial for Puritan colonists who wanted to practice their religion without restriction, and supplied fertile soil for growing cotton and tobacco.

Labor of the land was relied on the enslaved African Americans that were either imported from New England, or purchased from Africa. "Slavery and colonization went hand in hand. Without colonies to grow staple crops like sugar, rice, and tobacco, and to proffer wealth in the form of valuable minerals, there would have been much less need for slaves. Without Indian and African slaves, there would have been no labor to grow the crops or to extract those minerals--at least not labor cost-efficient enough to create the profits that made the whole system viable."

== Slavery and psychological trauma ==
In the 17th century the Barbary Coast implemented a system to force captives, like Okeley, into slavery. After being captured, the captives were either locked below deck or put to work by the corsairs. These captives were beaten, lacked food and water, and lived in unsanitary conditions. When the captive and corsairs arrived to their respective territories, the corsairs paraded the captives through the town. Residents of the town, Turks, Moors, Jews and renegades cheered and taunted as the captives and corsairs walked. For the corsairs, they were celebrating their new booty. The captives were humiliated and ashamed of their new status. The captives were in shock from the reversal of their fortunes.

Also, the captives were sometimes sent to the wealthy slave dealers or government officials to be introduced to older slaves. The older slaves shared information about society and servitude in the Barbary Coast. They helped the newcomers understand lingua franca and lent them money. Also, they provided information about social customs like, kissing the hem of their master's robe. The veteran slaves helped the captives become less susceptible to anxiety or depression from these new experiences. However, these veterans were employed by their masters to gain information about the captives to demand higher sale prices or ransoms in the slave market.

Okeley recounts his experience at the slave market in his narrative. Okeley compares his experience to a slaughterhouse because he is treated like a beast. The maquignons (horse traders) inspect the captives by looking at their teeth, limbs, hair, beard, and face. They inspect these body parts to determine if the captives are fit for labor. They inspect the limbs for any broken bones, dislocation, or any bone disease that are commonly found in horses. The maquigonins could not judge the age of the captives effectively. Age was important because, for a male slave it determines their work-ability and for a female if she is worth buying as a consort for a harem. Okeley's description is an example of dehumanization. The captives are treated like beast because they are inspected like horses by horse traders. This is the first of many of Okeley's traumatic experiences while captured in Algiers.

While enslaved in Algiers, Okeley is accused of attempting to escape by a spy. The spy sees Okeley near the shore with John Randal, another slave, and assumes they are planning an escape. Okeley and Randal were charged by the viceroy and his council with an attempt to escape. They were beaten with the batoon. Afterwards, they were chained and locked away in the viceroy's prison until their patrons came to receive them. After being delivered by his patron, Randal was given three hundred blows upon his feet. The spy that seized them demanded a payment from Okeley's patron. Okeley's patron ordered him to work in the looms. After Okeley is sold to his second patron, he begins a plan to escape. While he is preparing a sail for the boat, Okeley notices the spy that accused him of attempted escape. Okeley becomes anxious and begins to panic because he knows if he is caught and pleads guilty, he will face punishment. Slaves can roam the town without their patrons. However, a spy system is implemented to force the slaves to comply. This is an example of the psychological coercive method called, monopolization of perception. The perpetrators limit their victims understanding of the world by monopolizing their attention. The spy system limits Okeley's perception and understanding of his new world. Okeley is constantly being watched which, causes anxiety.

== Return ==
After making a daring escape by assembling a boat with a few other English slaves, he survived six days at sea, one time drinking his own urine and eating a turtle but eventually reached the island of Mallorca. The group struggled their way to the capital Palma where the local authority took care of his needs at his expense. Eventually, he returned by way of Gibraltar while sailing with a merchant ship bound for England, he narrowly avoided capture by corsairs off the Straits of Gibraltar. Unfortunately, he returned in 1644 to a country embroiled in Civil War. Much later in 1675 he published his captivity narrative, by an unidentified friend who helped with writing his prose and the book was sold by Nathaniel Ponder, a conformist bookseller.

His book was titled Ebenezer; or, a Small Monument of Great Mercy, Appearing in the Miraculous Deliverance of William Okeley, John Anthony, William Adams, John Jephs, John --, Carpenter, from the Miserable Slavery of Algiers with the Wonderful Means of Their Escape in a Boat of Canvas; the Great Distress and Utmost Extremeties Which They Endured at Sea for Six Days and Nights; [and] Their Safe Arrival at Mayork, with Several Matters of Remark During Their Long Captivity and the Following Providences of God Which Brought Them Safe to England.
