= Monoco =

Nashaway sacham

Monoco (died 1676) was a 17th-century Nashaway sachem (chief), known among the New England Puritans as One-eyed John.

After decades of peaceful coexistence, tensions arose between settlers and natives. The Nashaway attacked the neighboring English settlement in the Lancaster Raid of Lancaster, Massachusetts, in August 1675 and again in February 1676 with Sagamore Sam as part of the more general native-settler conflict known as King Philip's War. During the latter action, Monoco kidnapped a villager, Mary Rowlandson, and took her and her children with him and his party for many weeks. Rowlandson later wrote and published what became a best-selling narrative about her captivity with the Indians and release, A Narrative of the Captivity and Restoration of Mrs. Mary Rowlandson.

On March 13, 1676, Monoco raided Groton, Massachusetts. He took control of a garrison house in the center of town and proceeded to parley with a Captain James Parker, threatening to burn "Chelmsford, Concord, Watertown, Cambridge, Charlestown, Roxbury, Boston, adding at last in his dialect: "What me will - me do." He then burned the town to the ground, forcing its inhabitants to flee to Concord.

In September 1676 Monoco was captured in Dover, New Hampshire and executed on the Boston Common in Boston, Massachusetts when his associate Tantamous' son, Peter Jethro intentionally (or unintentionally) turned in his fellow Native Americans to be executed and enslaved through negotiations with Richard Waldron.
