= Lancaster Raid =

Raid on English colonial town by Wampanoag warriors

Coordinates: 42.4534°N 71.6734°W

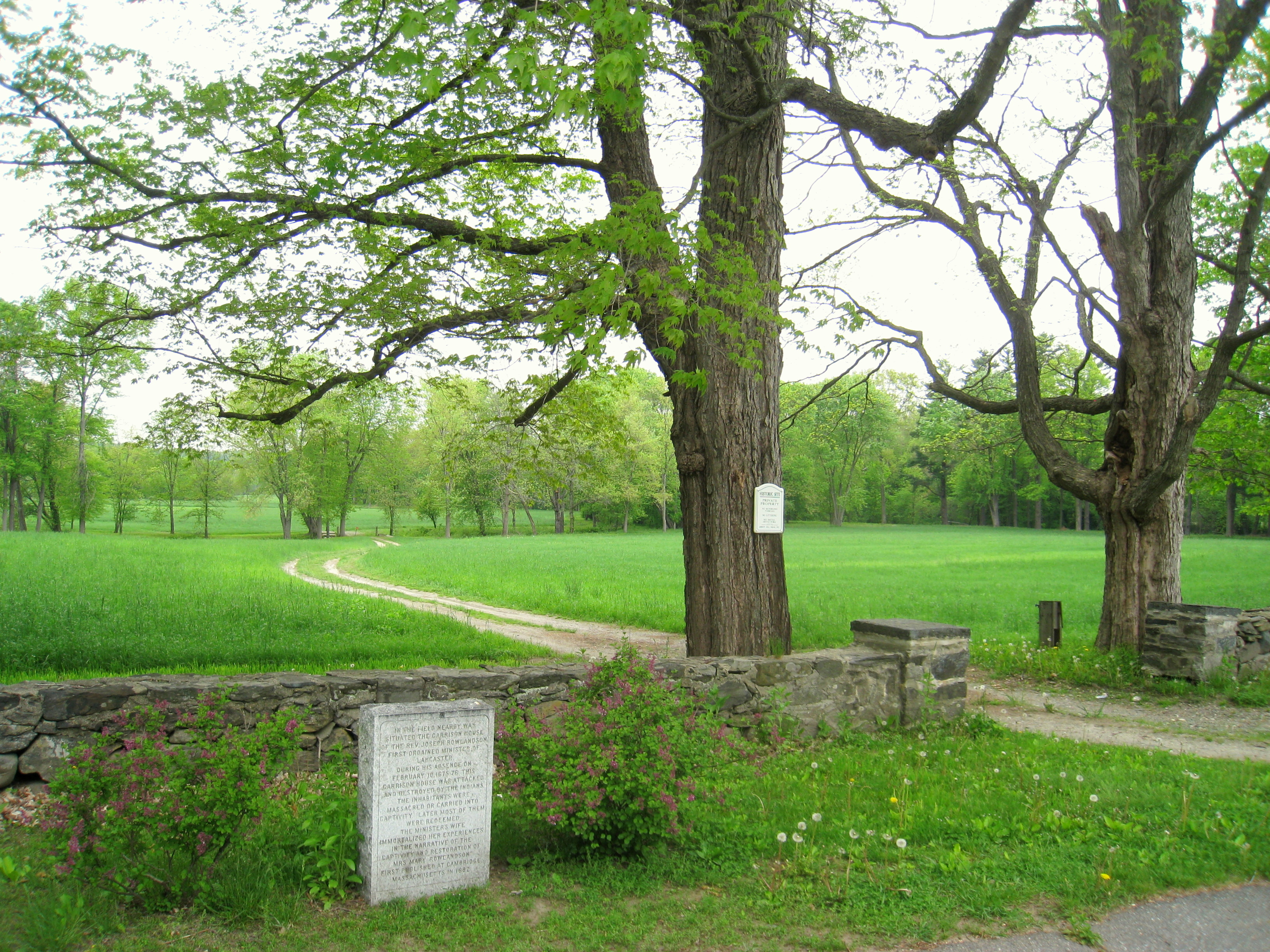
Lancaster raid site on Main Street in Lancaster

The Lancaster Raid was the first in a series of five planned raids on English colonial towns during the winter of 1675-1676 as part of King Philip's War. Metacom, known by English colonists as King Philip, was a Wampanoag sachem who led and organized Wampanoag warriors during the war. Teaming up with Nipmuc and Narragansett warriors, the Wampanoag successfully raided the town of Lancaster, securing provisions and prisoners to help them carry on into their winter offensive.

== Mounting tension ==
The Lancaster Raid was preceded by several years of mounting tension between English colonists in Lancaster and their Native American neighbors, particularly those in Nashaway. This tension stemmed from the decline in the fur trade due to overhunting, the dramatic decrease in the native population and social disruption due to European endemic diseases, and the competition for resources as English livestock invaded Indian lands. In 1675, the Wampanoag sachem Metacom cited his grievances as, "English cheating, discrimination, and pressures to sell land, submit to Plymouth colony's authority, convert to Christianity, and consume alcohol". To relieve tensions and ensure loyalty, Daniel Gookin, the superintendent of Christian Indians, traveled to Nipmuc villages to establish praying towns and convert the inhabitants to Christianity. However, the Nipmuc in Nashaway, unlike in many other towns, did not agree to become a praying town due to their intense distrust of the English and their missionaries.

== Attack on Lancaster, 1675 ==
Tensions continued to escalate until August 1675, when the Nipmuc from Nashaway staged an attack on Lancaster colonists, led by their sachem Monoco. Seven inhabitants of Lancaster died during the attack. For better defense, Lancaster built several garrison houses, large structures in which many colonists would gather during times of military strife, protected by fourteen stationed soldiers. After this, the war continued to spread westward, with the varied Indians staging many attacks on different English towns.

== Spies sent ==
The Lancaster Raid, commonly represented as a surprise attack, was not entirely a surprise. In December 1675, Daniel Gookin and the other leaders of the Massachusetts Council recruited two Christian Nipmuc men, James Quannapohit and Job Kattenanit, to act as spies. They were sent to gather information about other groups of Native Americans' loyalties and plans of attack against the English settlements. Traveling with the Nipmuc, the spies discovered that both the Narragansett and Nipmuc were planning to join Metacom's Wampanoag warriors to "burn and destroy the other frontier towns". The spies, Quannapohit and Kattenanit, were eventually found out and threatened by Metacom, so they fled. They split up, with Quannapohit the first to return to Cambridge on January 24, 1676, reporting to Gookin that the Nipmuc were planning an attack on Lancaster.

== Kattenanit's report ==
Despite Quannapohit's warning, the leaders of the Massachusetts Council did not take the threat seriously, and did little to prepare Lancaster for attack. They likely did not trust Quannapohit's warning or had larger threats to consider at the time. Several men from Lancaster took the threat more seriously, and traveled to Boston to try to recruit more troops for Lancaster, but to no avail.

On February 9, Kattenanit reached Cambridge and also warned the Council of the threat, saying it was planned for the following day. Kattenanit reported that an attacking group of four hundred warriors had set out for Lancaster. By then, the Massachusetts Council ordered garrisons from other towns to aid Lancaster. But only Marlborough received word by the next morning, and their forces were unable to reach Lancaster until after the Indians had raided and set the town on fire.

== Lancaster Raid occurs ==
The Lancaster Raid took place on February 10, 1676. As in the August 1675 attack, Monoco, known as "One-Eyed John" by the English, as well as Sagamore Sam, planned and led the raid. The Native American forces numbered 400, made up of Narragansett, Nipmuc, and Wampanoag warriors. After they reached the town, the Indian forces burned the entry bridge, preventing access by outside English reinforcements could not easily enter. Once in town, they used torches to light houses on fire, including the garrisoned house of the village minister, Joseph Rowlandson. He had been one of the men who traveled to Boston seeking reinforcements, and had not yet returned. Most of the soldiers in the garrison survived the fire and were taken as prisoners. A few soldiers died in the fire, among at least fourteen Lancaster inhabitants lost. Twenty-three persons were taken captive, including women and children. The arrival of Marlborough troops forced the Indians to withdraw with their new captives.

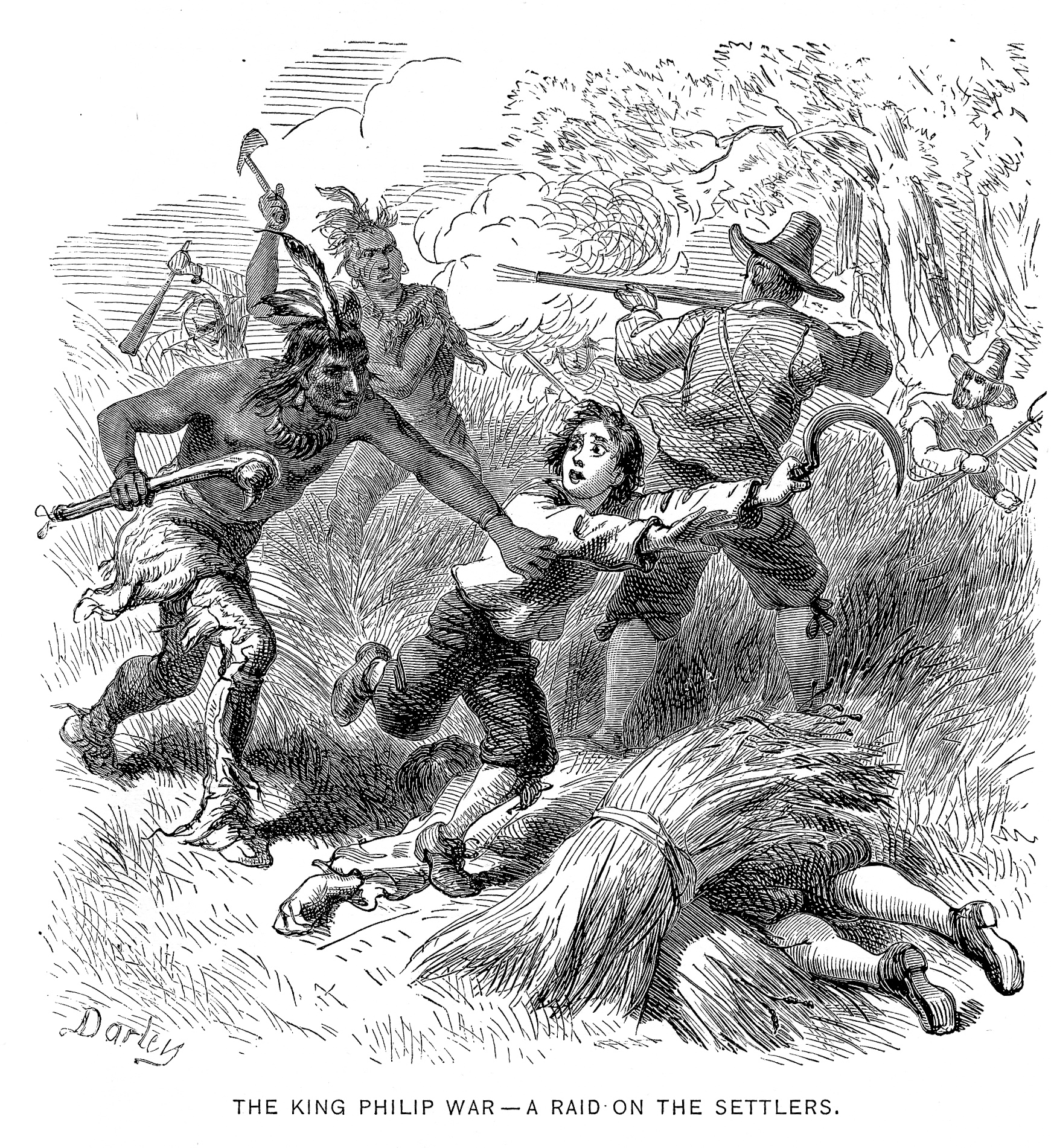
Being taken captive during a raid

After the raid, the medicine man, Tantamous (Old Jethro), and ten other Nipmuc were falsely accused of the killings, allegedly due to their "singing, dancing, and having much powder and many bullets and slugs hid in their baskets." They were acquitted after the role of the sachem Monoco was discovered. In addition, Peter Jethro, Tantamous's son, aided the settlers by communicating with the captors of Mary Rowlandson to obtain her release.

== Mary Rowlandson taken captive ==
Mary Rowlandson, the village minister's wife, survived the fire along with three of her children, one of whom shortly died. She was held as a prisoner for nearly three months, separately from her children, and was forced to travel with the raiding bands.

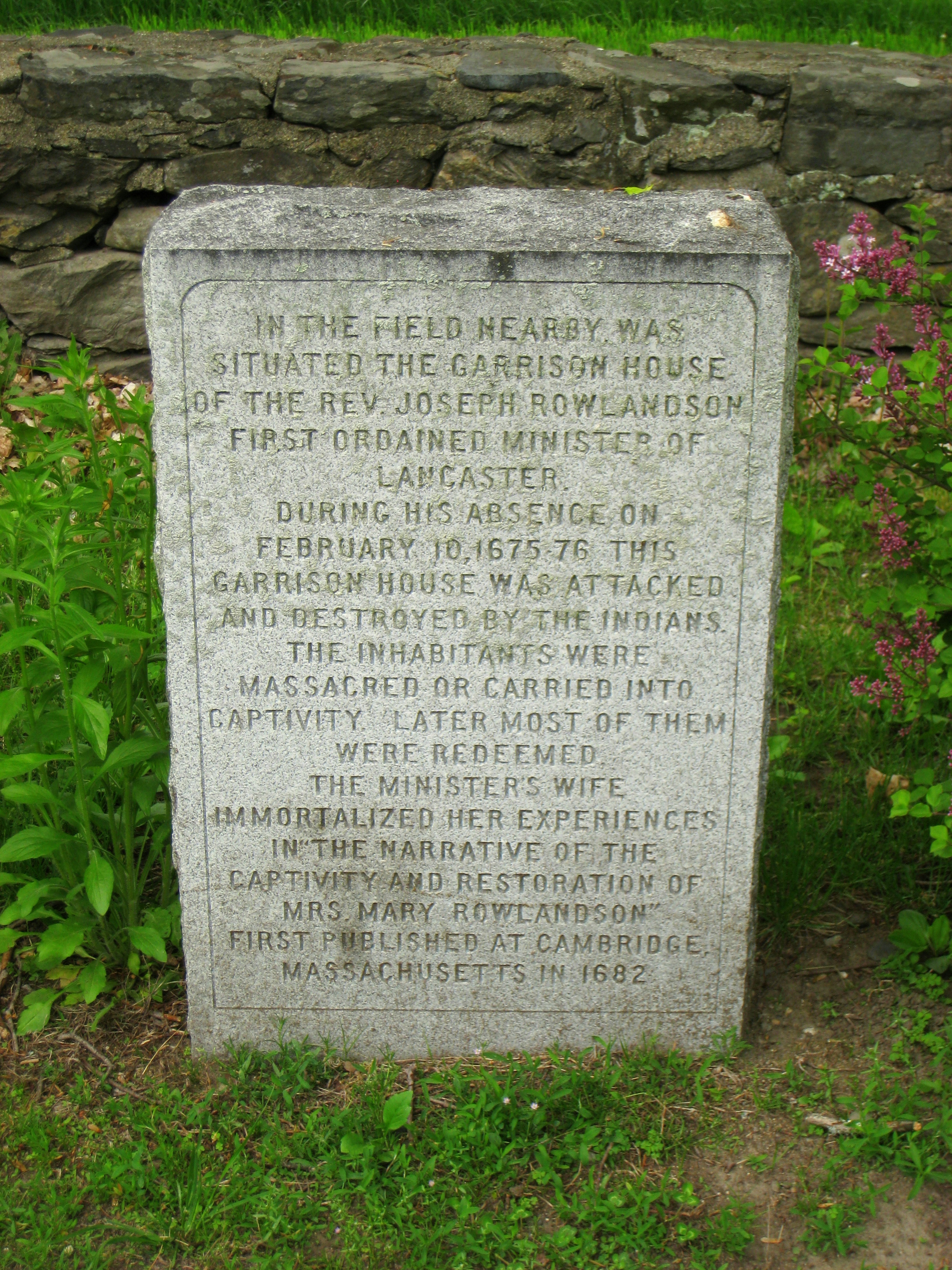
Lancaster raid site on Main Street in Lancaster

After her release, she wrote a memoir of this period that was published in 1682. It is considered one of the genre of captivity narratives. She described herself as a servant to Quinnapin, a Narragansett sachem. Historians believe she likely was an adopted member of the household with an ambiguous status, and expected to work. Although required to perform seamstress work and other chores, Mary was treated relatively kindly by Quinnapin and Metacom, likely because of her high status among colonial society and her high political and economic value as a hostage.

She complained chiefly of abuse by Quinnapin's wife, Weetamoo, who demanded Mary's subservience. Eventually many of the captives were ransomed and returned home, such as Rowlandson, Mrs. John Kettell, and others.

== Lancaster abandoned ==
The town of Lancaster was devastated after the raid. In addition to having buildings destroyed, the townspeople had lost their food stores to the raiders, in the middle of winter. They were vulnerable to another attack and dependent on receiving food supplies. Many survivors left town by way of carts sent by the General Court in March 1676, and the town was mostly abandoned.
