= Charles W. Moors =

American politician

Charles W. Moors was a member of the Wisconsin State Assembly.

== Biography ==
Moors was born on November 29, 1842, in Lancaster, Massachusetts. During the American Civil War, he served with the 30th Wisconsin Volunteer Infantry Regiment of the Union Army.

== Political career ==
Moors was a member of the Assembly in 1880 and 1881. Additionally, he was Town Clerk and Town Treasurer of Hancock (town), Wisconsin. He was a Republican.
