= Trivium School =

Location
- Lancaster, Massachusetts; United States; 42.462174°N 71.689304°W

Information
- Type: Private Independent Catholic
- Motto: Sed nomini tuo da gloriam (unofficial) ("But to thy name give glory")
- Patron saint: Sedes Sapientiae
- Established: 1979
- Headmaster: William M. Schmitt
- Grades: 7-12
- Enrollment: 100 students
- Student to teacher ratio: 7:1
- Colors: Red and Gold
- Song: Trivium nostrum
- Athletics: Basketball, Soccer, Baseball
- Athletics conference: Worcester County Athletic Conference (WCAC)
- Website: http://triviumschool.com/

Trivium School is an independent Catholic college-preparatory school for boys and girls in grades seven through twelve, located in Lancaster, Massachusetts.

== Background ==
Trivium School was founded in 1979 by John S. Schmitt, its establishing headmaster, as the first classical school in America. Mr. Schmitt studied education at Harvard University and taught briefly at Colorado Rocky Mountain School and Millbrook School before founding Thomas More School in Harrisville, New Hampshire, in 1959. Schmitt then taught at Thomas Aquinas College in California from 1974-1979, leaving to establish Trivium School in the same year. The School is named for the Trivium, the first three liberal arts (Grammar, Logic, and Rhetoric). The students follow a unified curriculum that includes college preparatory studies with an emphasis on the intellectual virtues. The curriculum is influenced by the ideas of Mortimer J. Adler, Sister Miriam Joseph, and Dorothy L. Sayers by its stated purpose to develop the "tools for learning" instead of simply teaching subjects. Its stated mission also includes the use of the Socratic method in small classes with a low student-teacher ratio. Students are required to participate in studios of music, visual arts, and drama, and to sing in the School chorus.
