= A Narrative of the Captivity and Restoration of Mrs. Mary Rowlandson =

1682 New World captivity memoir

- Author: Mary Rowlandson
- Language: English
- Genre: Captivity narrative
- Publication date: 1682
- Publication place: United States

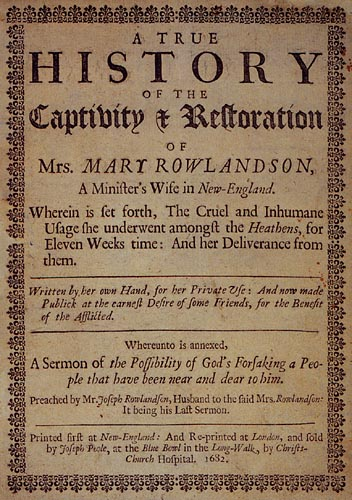
A True History of the Captivity and Restoration of Mrs. Mary Rowlandson, a Minister's Wife in New-England, First edition London 1682

A Narrative of the Captivity and Restoration of Mrs. Mary Rowlandson (also known as The Sovereignty and Goodness of God) is a 1682 memoir written by Mary (White) Rowlandson, a married English colonist and mother who was captured in 1675 in an attack by Native Americans during King Philip's War. She was held by them for ransom for 11 weeks and 5 days. Six years after being released, her account of the ordeal was published, which is considered a formative example of the literary genre of captivity narratives. It is also considered one of America's first bestsellers, and four editions were printed in 1682 when it was first published.

== Summary ==
During King Philip's War on February 10, 1675, the settlement of Lancaster, in the Massachusetts Bay Colony, was attacked by Native Americans. The warriors burned down houses and opened fire on the English settlers, killing several and wounding more. They took many of the survivors captive, including Mary Rowlandson and her three children. Mary and her youngest child were wounded, and others of her family, including her brother-in-law, were killed.

After spending a night in a nearby town, the Native Americans with their captives headed further into the wilderness. Being injured, the journey was difficult for Rowlandson and her daughter. They reached an Indian settlement called Wenimesset, where Rowlandson met another captive named Robert Pepper who tried to help the new captives. After staying in Wenimesset for about a week, Rowlandson's injured daughter, Sarah, died. Rowlandson was sold to another Indian who was related to King Philip by marriage. They buried Rowlandson's dead daughter, and she was allowed to visit her oldest daughter, Mary, who was also being held in Wenimesset. Her son was allowed to visit from a nearby Indian settlement. The Indians gave Rowlandson a Bible in which she found a great deal of hope. This gave her the trust to begin exploring more.

After attacking another town, the Native Americans decided to head north, and Rowlandson was again separated from her family and her new friends. The Native Americans, along with Rowlandson, began to move quickly through the forest, as the English army was nearby. They came to the Baquaug River and crossed it with the English soldiers close behind. The English were not able to cross, and Rowlandson and the Indians continued northwest. They reached the Connecticut River and planned on meeting King Philip, but English scouts were present, so they scattered and hid.

Rowlandson and the Native Americans soon crossed the river and met King Philip. At this settlement, Rowlandson sewed clothing for the Indians in exchange for food. Rowlandson wanted to go to Albany in hopes of being sold for gunpowder, but the Indians took her northward and crossed the river again. Rowlandson started hoping that she might be returned home, but the Indians turned south, continuing along the Connecticut River instead of heading east toward English settlements. The Indians continued their raids and captured Thomas Read, who joined Rowlandson's group. Read told Rowlandson that her husband was alive and well, which gave her hope and comfort. Rowlandson's group began to move east.

They crossed the Baquaug River again where they met messengers telling Rowlandson she had to go to Wachuset where the Indians would discuss the possibility of her returning to freedom. Rowlandson eagerly headed towards Wachuset, but the journey wore her down. She was disheartened by the sight of a colonist injured in a previous Indian attack. She eventually reached Wachuset and spoke to King Philip, who guaranteed her freedom in two weeks. The council asked how much her husband would pay for her ransom, and they sent a letter to Boston offering her freedom for twenty pounds.

After many more Indian attacks and victories, Rowlandson was allowed to travel back to Lancaster, then to Concord and finally to Boston. She was reunited with her husband after 11 weeks. They stayed with a friend in Concord for a while until Rowlandson's sister, son, and daughter were also returned. Reunited, the family built a house in Boston, where they lived until 1677.

== Themes ==
Rowlandson writes about the uncertainty of life and its brevity. In particular, from the attack and the death of her children, both the uncertainty and the brevity of life was apparent. As a Christian woman of her time, she also discusses her unwavering belief in God as she interpreted events. It is possible that Mary Rowlandson wrote her story with a desire to represent herself to her readers sometimes at the expense of the facts.

During her captivity Rowlandson adapted to the community more and more, as can be found in the subtext. One example is that she initially called the food she was given "filthy trash", but later found it „sweet and savory to [...] taste“. With learning came more acceptance and she gradually understood how its preparation related to their mobile lives.
