= Beaman Oak =

Coordinates: 42.468°N 71.673°W

The Beaman Oak was the largest white oak tree in the Commonwealth of Massachusetts. It stood in the front yard of a colonial era three-story house in the town of Lancaster. It was so named because Gamaliel Beaman had originally settled the spot in 1659. The oak became known as a prominent landmark in Central Massachusetts and is featured prominently on the town seal of West Boylston.

In 1970, the Beaman Oak's circumference at its base was 31 ft (9.4 m), with a circumference 5 ft (1.5 m) above the base of 31 ft (9.4 m), and its height was 75 ft (23 m) and spread was 75 ft (23 m).

The oak's trunk was partially hollow towards the end of its life. After a storm severely damaged it, the tree was cut down in 1989.

== See also ==
- List of individual trees
