= Nashaway =

Indigenous tribe from Massachusetts

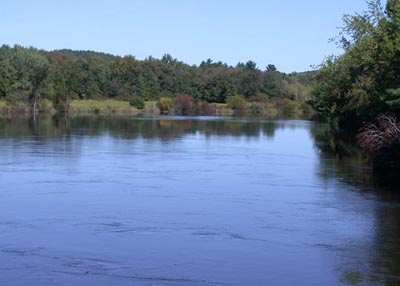
- The Nashua River in Groton, Massachusetts. The tribe took its name from this tributary of the Merrimack River

Total population
- extinct as a tribe

Regions with significant populations
- southern New Hampshire, northern Massachusetts

Languages
- unattested Eastern Algonquian language

Religion
- Indigenous

Related ethnic groups
- Powhatan Confederacy

The Nashaway (or Nashua or Weshacum) were a tribe of Algonquian Indians inhabiting the upstream portions of the Nashua River valley in what is now the northern half of Worcester County, Massachusetts, mainly in the vicinity of Sterling, Clinton, ⁣Lancaster and other towns near Mount Wachusett, as well as southern New Hampshire. The meaning of Nashaway is "between," an adverbial form derived from "nashau" meaning "someone is between/in the middle" = adverbial suffix "we"

== Territory ==
The Nashaway's principal settlement was Waushacum (possibly meaning "surface of the sea"), a parcel of land in what is now Sterling that was located between two ponds of the same name. The territory of the Nashaway was bounded downstream (to the north) on the Nashua River by the Pennacook, a powerful tribe with which numerous alliances were formed, to the east by tribes related to the Massachusett, to the south of the headwaters by Nipmuc bands and to the west by the Connecticut River where the Pocomtuc settled.

== History ==
=== 17th century ===
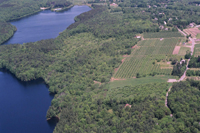
Sholan Farms, named after Chief Nashawhonan (Sholan), is located in Leominster, Massachusetts. It was one of the many Nashaway lands seized from the Indians to pay off their trading debts.

The first reports of the peoples of Massachusetts' interior were scant. The subdivisions had their own sachems (leaders) and functioned independently of each other. Although they shared a similar L-dialect and other common customs, very little evidence is shown of any confederation except for the various skirmishes with English colonists that ultimately led to King Philip's War. The bands made alliances and were possibly confederated with the Pennacook. In 1643 Nashaway leader Sholan deeded a large tract of land to the early settlers who formed the town of Lancaster, Massachusetts (Nashaway Plantation), which was followed by further deeds in Sterling by his nephew George Tahanto in 1701.

The tribes of the interior posed a problem for John Eliot, as the tribes were too far to visit and the area was still very much a frontier region. At the time of the first visits by John Prescott, the minister appointed to the tribe by the colony, power had been passed from Sachem Nashawhonan (Sholan) to Nanomocomuck (Monoco), a Pennacook chieftain descended from Passaconaway. Court records indicate that this sachem was charged for debts incurred for goods bought on credit and the high prices charged to them for the colonists' goods. This ultimately led to the loss of land and tensions that resulted in King Philip's War. In 1674 Daniel Gookin, superintendent of the Praying Indians, sent Peter Jethro, a "grave and pious Indian" to work as a missionary minister in Nashaway (Lancaster) and Weshakim (Sterling). The fate of the Nashaway is not known. The remnants of the tribe fled the area and merged with other tribes, such as the Pennacook or the Nipmuc proper, intermarrying. The Nashaway tribe is now extinct, although their descendants live among the Native Americans. Many of the Nashaway died while exiled on Deer Island in Boston Harbor. Their descendants can be found among the Abenaki of Canada or the Schaghticoke of Connecticut and New York and other tribes.

== Legacy ==
The Nashaway have left their imprint in many hydronyms and topographical features, such as the Sholan area of Leominster, the city and river known by "Nashua", and Mount Wachusett. During King Philip's War, the Nashaway sachem (chief) Monoco kidnapped a Lancaster villager, Mary Rowlandson. She later wrote a best-selling narrative about her captivity, forced journey from Lancaster northwest to the Connecticut River, and eventual release at Redemption Rock in present-day Princeton, Massachusetts. It was of the genre called captivity narratives. Often writers would refer to their spiritual journey prompted by the captivity experiences.

== See also ==
- Native American tribes in Massachusetts
