= Mary Rowlandson =

American woman captured by Native Americans

Mary (White) Rowlandson
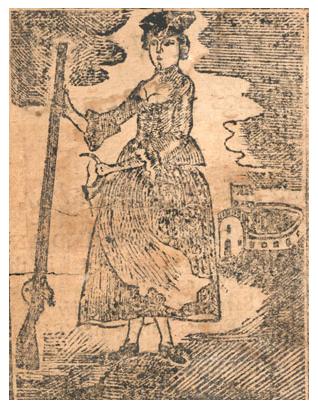
- Mary Rowlandson from A Narrative of the Captivity, Sufferings and Removes of Mrs. Mary Rowlandson, Boston: Nathaniel Coverly, 1770 (Note: Neal Salisbury points out in his introduction to Rowlandson's work (Bedford Books, 1997) that this woodcut was reused from The Life and Adventures of a Female Soldier, 1762, neglecting the fact that her narrative never mentions her using a gun. Salisbury also exhibits another woodcut for a 1773 edition showing her with a gun.)
- Born: c. 1637; Somersetshire, England
- Died: January 5, 1711 (aged 73-74); Massachusetts Bay Colony
- Occupation: American colonist
- Spouse(s): Joseph Rowlandson, Captain Samuel Talcott
- Children: Mary, Joseph, Mary, Sarah

Mary Rowlandson, née White, later Mary Talcott (c. 1637 – January 5, 1711), was a colonial American woman who was captured by Native Americans in 1676 during King Philip's War and held for 11 weeks before being ransomed. In 1682, six years after her ordeal, The Sovereignty and Goodness of God: Being a Narrative of the Captivity and Restoration of Mrs. Mary Rowlandson was published. This text is considered a formative American work in the literary genre of captivity narratives. It went through four printings in 1682 and garnered readership both in the New England colonies and in England, leading some to consider it the first American "bestseller".

== Biography ==
Mary White was born c. 1637 in Somerset, England. Her family left England sometime before 1650, settled at Salem in the Massachusetts Bay Colony, and in 1653, moved to Lancaster, on the Massachusetts frontier. There she married Reverend Joseph Rowlandson, the son of Thomas Rowlandson of Ipswich, Massachusetts, in 1656. Mary and Joseph Rowlandson had four children between 1658 and 1669, with their first daughter dying young.

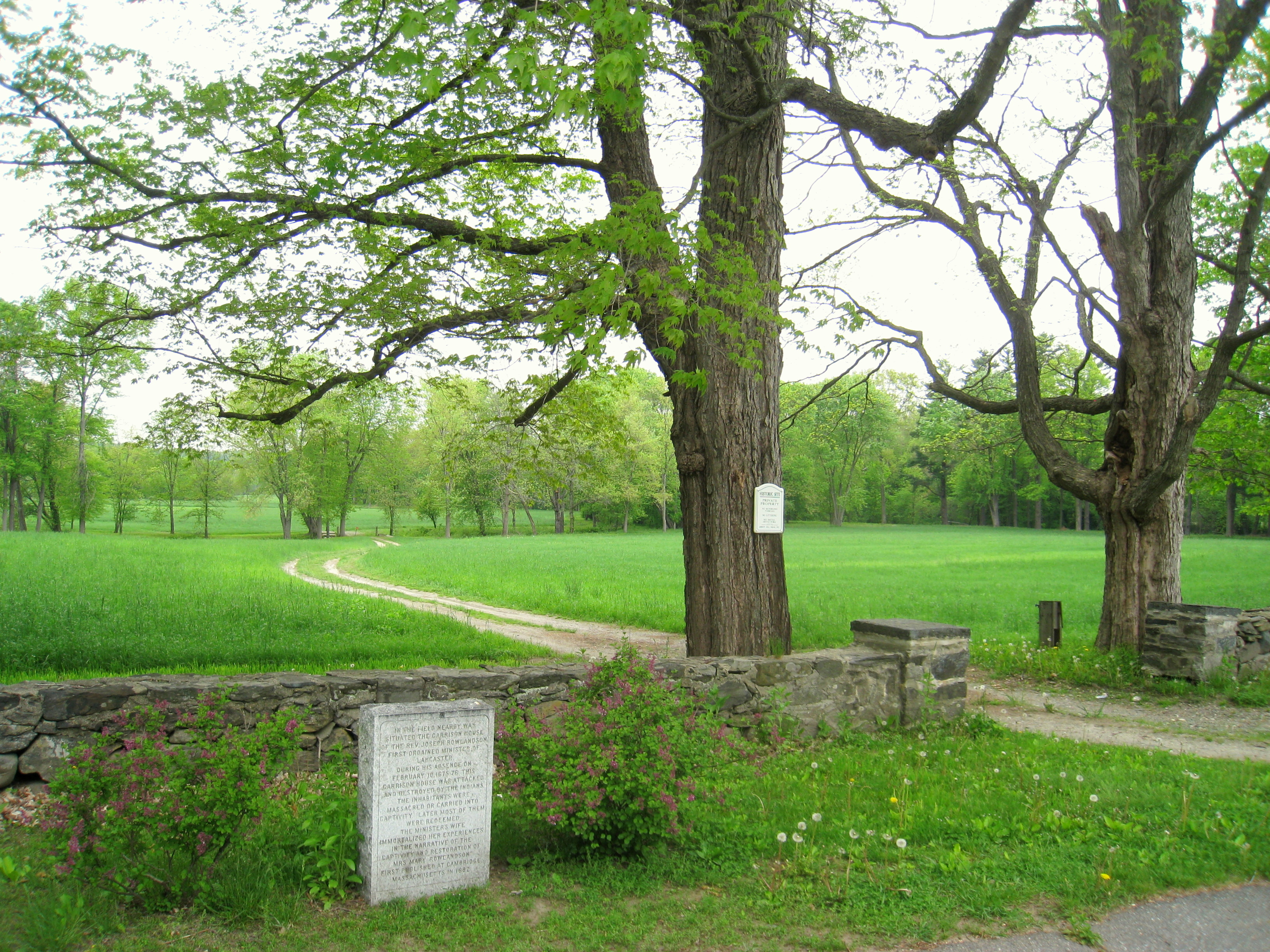
Site of Rowlandson's capture (Lancaster, Massachusetts)

At sunrise on February 10, 1676, (Note: Although Rowlandson writes that her captivity began on February 10, 1675, she was following the Julian calendar. As Neal Salisbury points out, the date according to the Gregorian calendar this would now be February 1676 (see Old Style and New Style dates). Neal Salisburgy (ed) The Sovereignty and Goodness of God, Together with the Faithfulness of His Promises Displayed (Boston: Bedford Books, 1997), 63. Rowlandson, Mary. Narrative of the captivity and Restoration of Mrs. Mary Rowlandson.) during King Philip's War, Lancaster came under attack by Narragansett, Wampanoag, and Nashaway–Nipmuc groups led by Monoco. Rowlandson and her three children, Joseph, Mary, and Sarah, were among those taken in the raid.

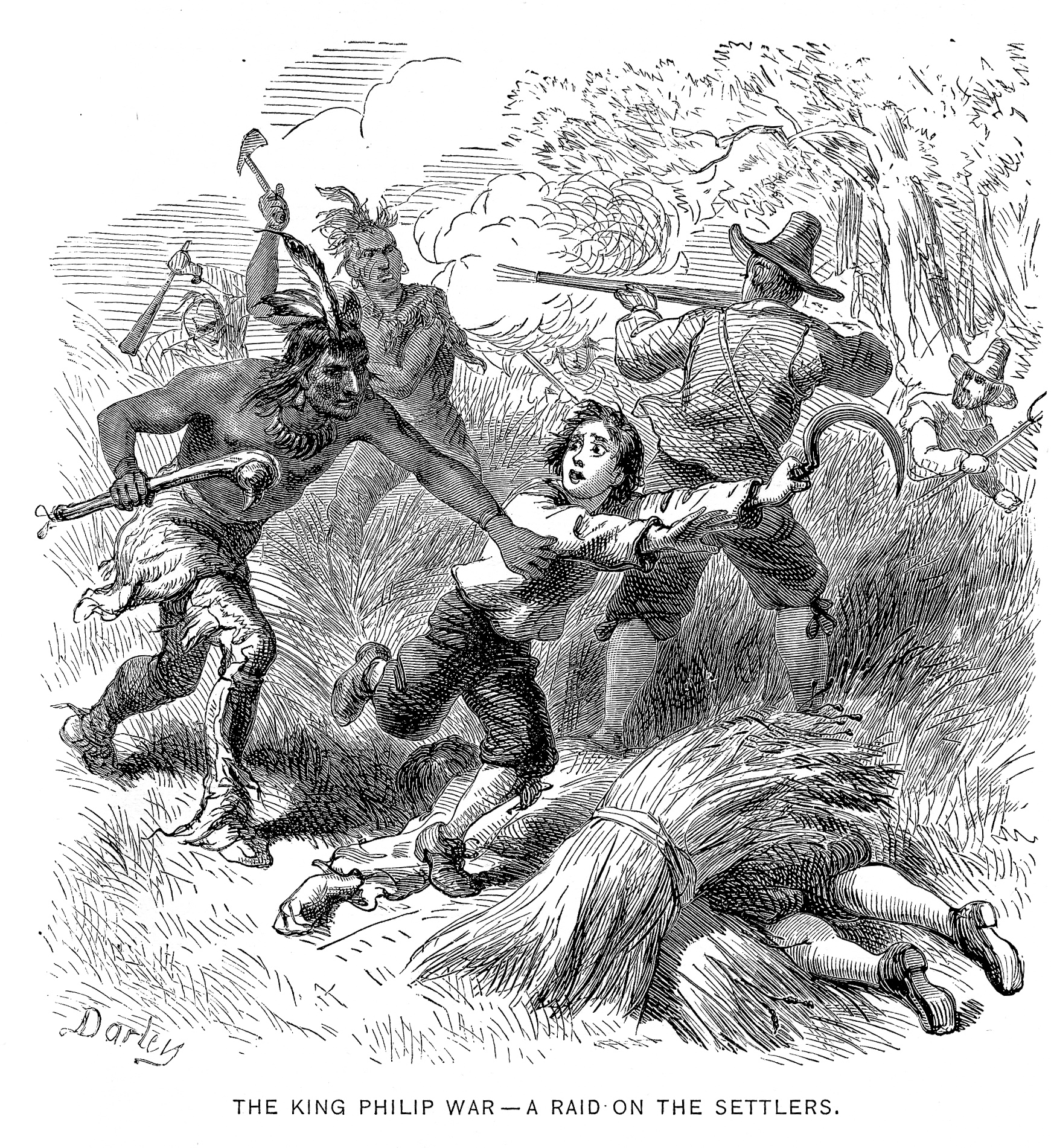

Rowlandson's 6-year-old daughter, Sarah, died from her wounds after a week of captivity.

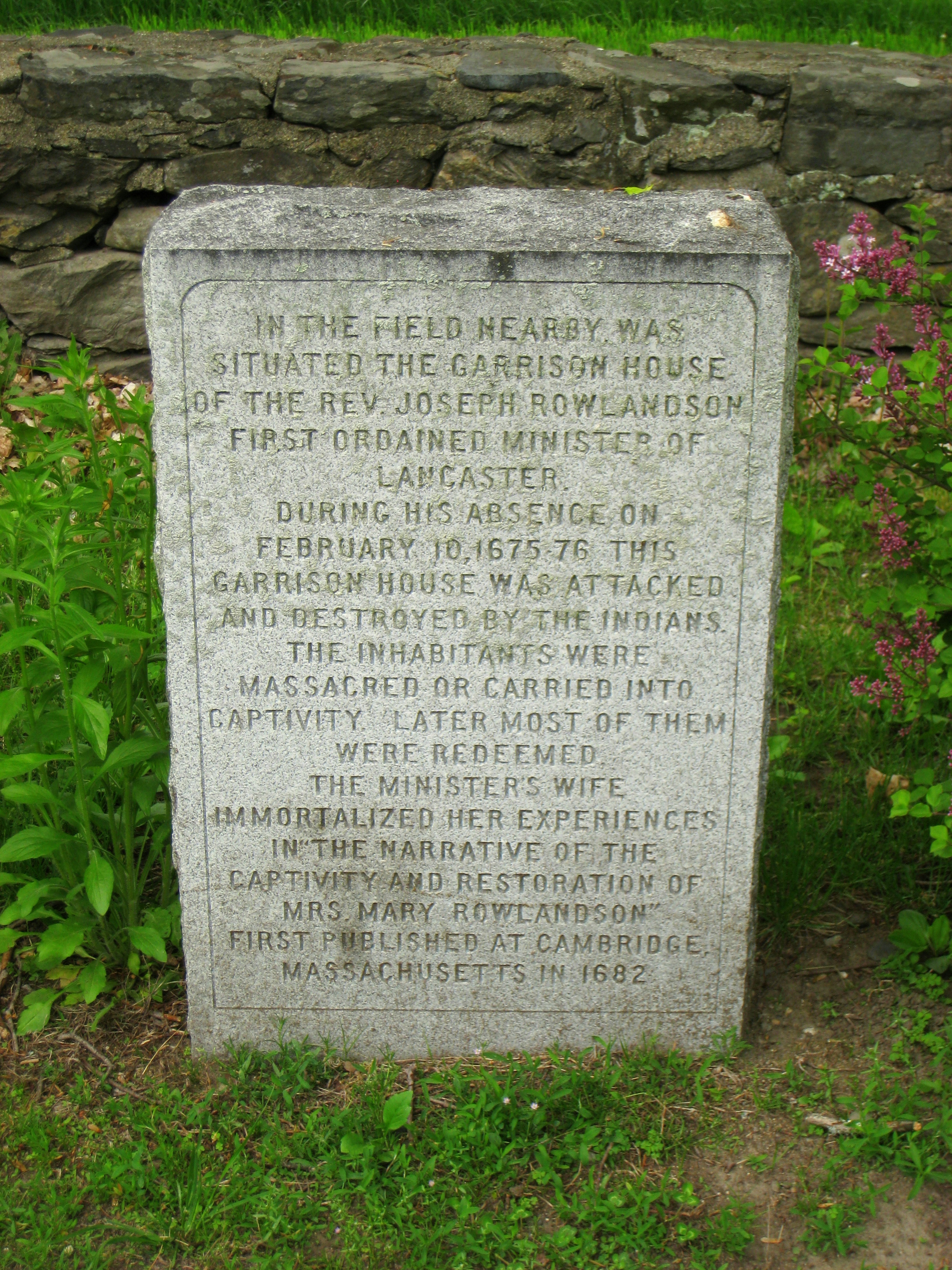
Lancaster raid site on Main Street in Lancaster

For more than 11 weeks, Rowlandson and her remaining children were forced to accompany the Native Americans as they travelled through the wilderness to carry out other raids and to elude the English militia. (Note: Part of the territory is now within Mount Grace State Forest.)

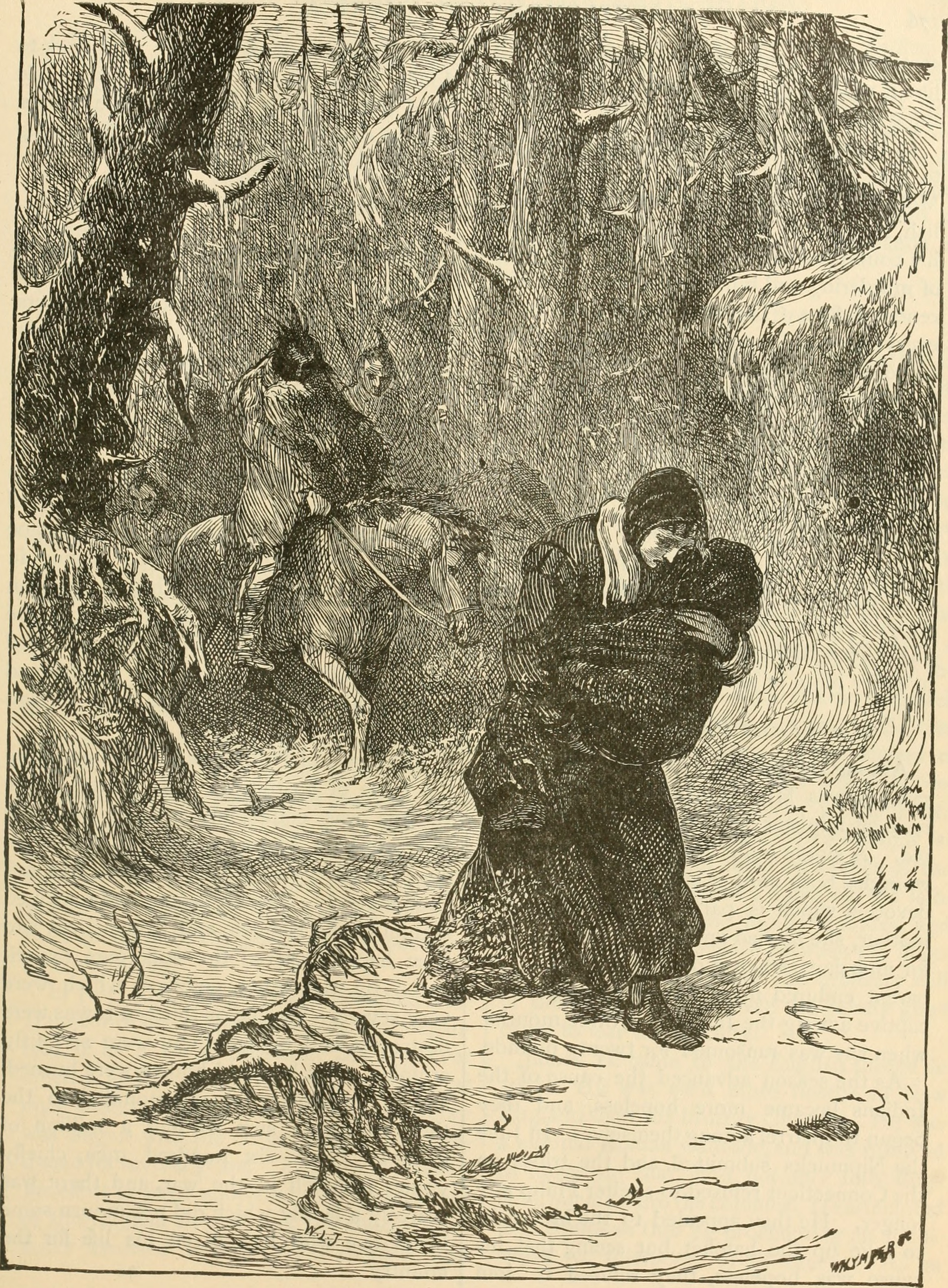
Original caption "Mary Rowlandson Captured by the Indians" (Northrop, Henry Davenport, 1836–1909)

The conditions of their captivity are recounted in detail in Rowlandson's captivity narrative. On May 2, 1676, Rowlandson was ransomed for £20, raised by the women of Boston in a public subscription and paid by John Hoar of Concord at Redemption Rock in Princeton, Massachusetts.

In 1677, Rowlandson moved with her family to Wethersfield, Connecticut, where her husband was installed as pastor in April of that year. He died in Wethersfield in November 1678. Church officials granted Mary a pension of £30 per year.

Mary Rowlandson and her children subsequently moved to Boston, where she is thought to have written her captivity narrative, although her original manuscript has not survived. It was published in Cambridge, Massachusetts, in 1682, and in London the same year. At one time scholars believed that Rowlandson had died before her narrative was published, but it was later discovered that she had lived for many more years. On August 6, 1679, she married Captain Samuel Talcott and took his surname. She died on January 5, 1711, aged approximately 73, outliving her second spouse by more than 18 years.

== The Sovereignty and Goodness of God ==
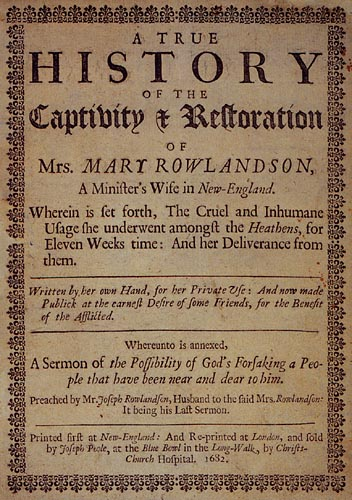
London edition (1682) title page of Rowlandson's narrative

Mary Rowlandson's autobiographical account of her kidnapping and ransom is considered a classic of the American captivity narrative genre. In it, she records how she witnessed the murder of her family and friends. Upon her capture, she traveled with her youngest child Sarah. Only six years old, Sarah died en route, near what is now the town of Hardwick, Massachusetts. Mary and her two other surviving children were kept separately and sold as property, until she was finally reunited with her husband after their ransom was paid.

Although she feared and reviled the Native Americans, Rowlandson explains that "not one of them ever offered the least abuse of unchastity to me in words or action", meaning that the natives never sexually molested or violated her. Her Puritan faith helped her make sense of her kidnapping. Rowlandson was unsure how far the colonists should travel into the wilderness away from Puritan settlements.

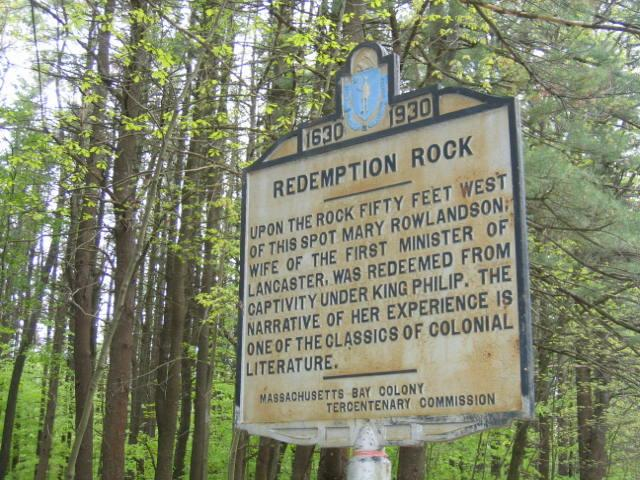
Historical marker in Princeton, Massachusetts, commemorating Rowlandson's release

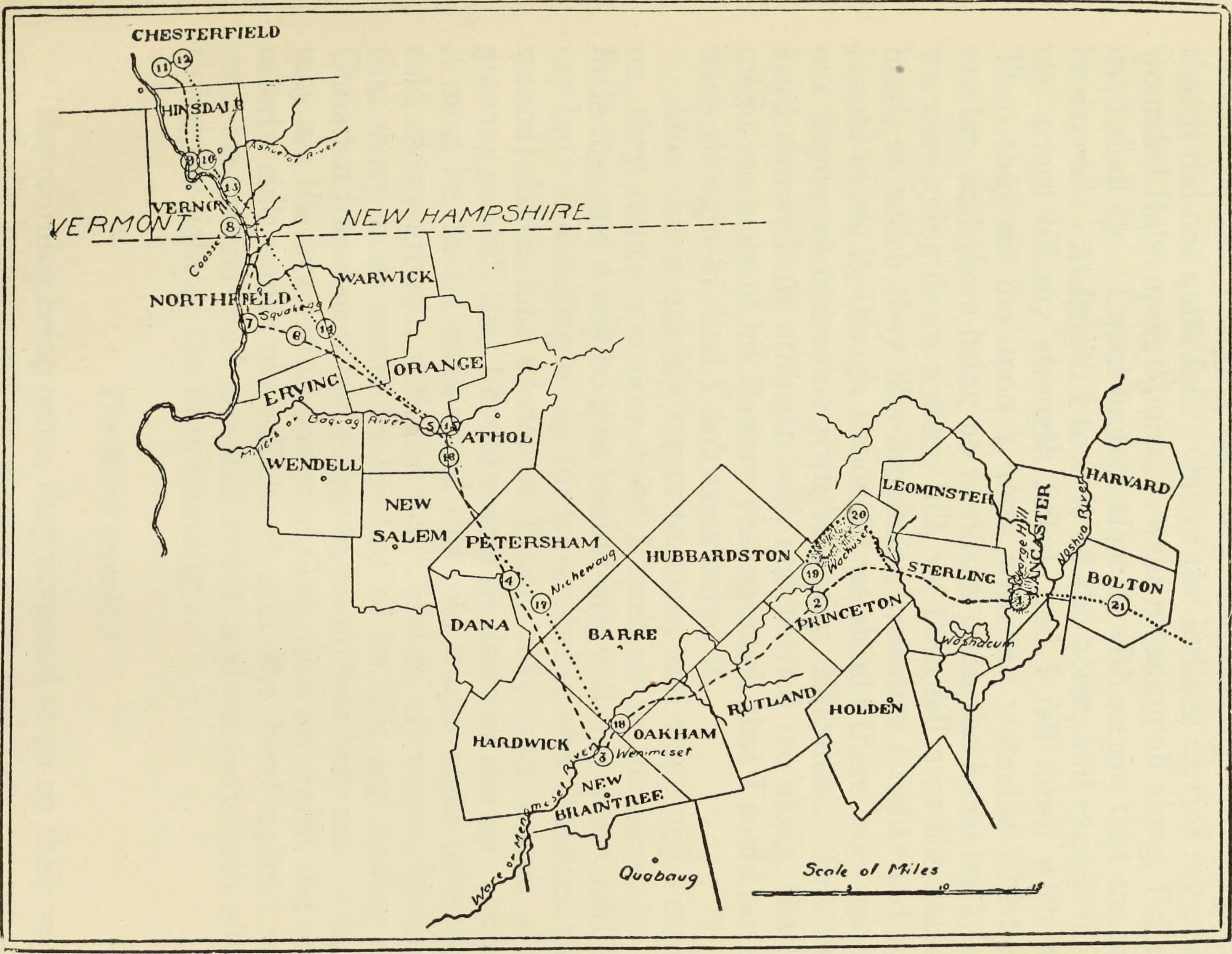
"Map of Mrs. Rowlandson's Removes"

Puritan colonists were curious about the experience of one who had lived among native people as a captive and then returned to colonial society. Many literate English people were familiar with the captivity narratives written by English and European traders and explorers during the 17th century, who were taken captive at sea off the coast of North Africa and in the Mediterranean and sometimes sold into slavery in the Middle East. (see John Smith).

A Narrative of the Captivity and Restoration of Mrs. Mary Rowlandson is among the most frequently cited examples of a captivity narrative and is often viewed as an archetypal model. Because of Rowlandson's encounter with her Native American captors, her narrative is also interesting for its treatment of intercultural contact. Finally, in its use of autobiography, Biblical typology, and similarity to the "Jeremiad", A Narrative of the Captivity offers valuable insight into the mind and lifestyle of a Puritan citizen.

=== Biblical content and ministerial influences ===
Scholars such as Gary Ebersole and Kathryn Derounian-Stodola have noted the similarities between Rowlandson's narrative and the Puritan Jeremiad and have considered the editorial influence that Increase Mather might have had on the text. In fact, many scholars identify Mather as the anonymous writer of "The Preface to the Reader" which was originally published with the narrative. In recent scholarship, Billy J. Stratton has further elaborated on this line of thought, claiming that Mather may have had a much more extensive involvement in the book's production than has been previously believed. Others argue that this perception is revisionist thinking based on today's perception of the Puritan past.

Throughout the narrative of Rowlandson's captivity, the central influence of Puritan philosophy is displayed through the use of Biblical quotations that function to reinforce her descriptions of a world of stark dichotomies: punishment and retribution, darkness and light, and good and evil. The prevalent use of scripture throughout the narrative often functioned as a source of strength and solace for Rowlandson. The lessons and meaning conveyed also acted to demonstrate her Puritan faith and belief that God's grace and Divine providence shape the events of the world. For example, when Rowlandson did not know where her children were (or even whether they were alive), she stated, "And my poor girl, I knew not where she was, not whether she was sick, or well, or alive, or dead. I repaired under these thoughts to my Bible (my great comfort in that time) and that scripture came to my hand, 'Cast thy burden on the Lord, and He shall sustain thee' (Psalm 55.22)."

== See also ==
- Captivity narrative
- Monoco, Nashaway tribe sachem
- John Williams (New England minister), who wrote a captivity narrative after being captured in the 1704 Raid on Deerfield
