= Lancaster, Massachusetts =

- Town
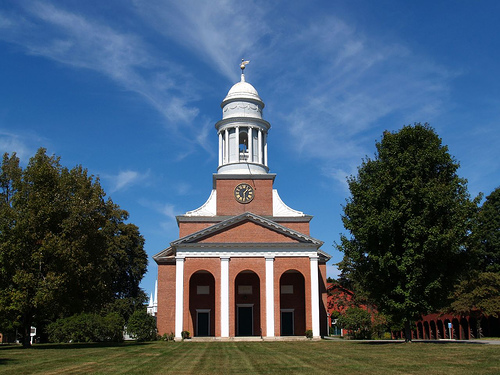
- First Church of Christ, a National Historic Landmark designed by Charles Bulfinch

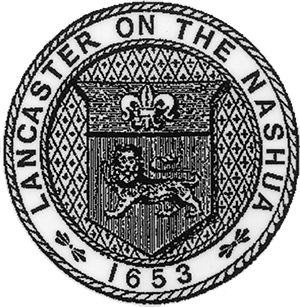
- Seal
- Nickname: Lancaster-on-the-Nashua
- Location in Worcester County and the state of Massachusetts.
- Coordinates: 42°27′20″N 71°40′25″W
- Country: United States
- State: Massachusetts
- County: Worcester
- Settled: 1643
- Incorporated: 1653

Government
  - Type: Open town meeting
  - Town Administrator: John Woodsmall III
  - Select Board: Jason Allison; Ralph A. Gifford III; David R. Carr

Area
  - Total: 28.2 sq mi (73.0 km^{2})
  - Land: 27.7 sq mi (71.8 km^{2})
  - Water: 0.50 sq mi (1.3 km^{2})
- Elevation: 299 ft (91 m)

Population (2020)
  - Total: 8,441
  - Density: 304/sq mi (118/km^{2})
- Time zone: UTC−5 (Eastern)
  - Summer (DST): UTC−4 (Eastern)
- ZIP Codes: 01523 (Lancaster); 01561 (South Lancaster)
- Area code: 351/978
- FIPS code: 25-34165
- GNIS feature ID: 0618368
- Website: ci.lancaster.ma.us

Lancaster is a town in Worcester County, Massachusetts, United States. Incorporated in 1653, Lancaster is the oldest town in Worcester County. As of the 2020 census, the town population was 8,441. It contains the village of South Lancaster.

== History ==
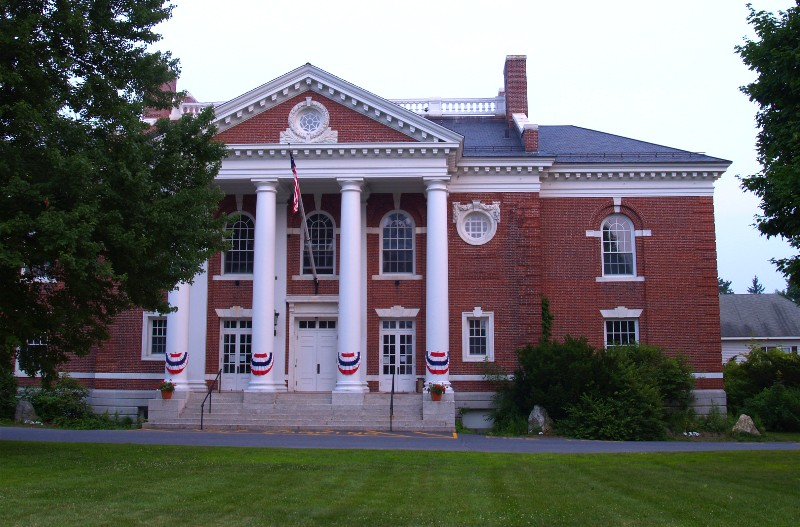
Town Hall

In 1643 Lancaster was first settled as "Nashaway" (named after the local Nashaway Native American tribe) by a group of colonists known as the Nashaway Company who may have initially been interested in iron deposits in the area. Several of the company were blacksmiths or gunsmiths, including, Herman Garrett, and as early as 1653 a settler, George Adams, was whipped for selling guns and alcohol to the Indians in the area. The town was officially incorporated and renamed "Lancaster on the Nashua" in 1653. Prominent Massachusetts military leader Simon Willard served as an advisor to the company and eventually settled in Lancaster for a period, and provided guns to the local tribe by order of the Massachusetts General Court.

Supporters of Lancaster's founder, John Prescott, born in 1604 (great-grandfather of Bunker Hill leader William Prescott), wished to name the new settlement Prescott, but the Massachusetts General Court considered such a request from a common freeman presumptuous, given that at that time, not even a governor had held the honor of naming a town after himself. Instead, they decided to use Lancaster, the name of Prescott's home town in England.

Until it was cut down in 1989 due to safety concerns, Lancaster boasted the largest oak tree in the state, called the Beaman Oak, named after settler Gamaliel Beaman (1623–1677).

Lancaster boasts being the official "mothertown" to all of Eastern central Massachusetts. Towns such as Harvard, Bolton, Leominster, Clinton, Berlin, Sterling, and part of West Boylston were all formed from territory of the original boundaries of Lancaster.

During Metacom's War, in February 1676 (1675 old style calendar), Mary Rowlandson was taken captive by Native Americans during the Lancaster raid. Rowlandson later wrote a book about her experiences titled A Narrative of the Captivity and Restoration of Mrs. Mary Rowlandson. In 2000, Lancaster Elementary School changed its name to Mary Rowlandson Elementary School.

== Geography ==
According to the United States Census Bureau, the town has a total area of 28.2 square miles (73 km^{2}), of which 27.7 square miles (72 km^{2}) is land and 0.5 square miles (1.3 km^{2}), or 1.84%, is water.

Lancaster is bordered by Lunenburg and Shirley to the north, Harvard to the northeast, Bolton to the southeast, Clinton to the south, Sterling to the southwest, and Leominster to the northwest.

== Demographics ==
Historical population
Year	Pop.	±%
1790	1,460	—
1850	1,688	+15.6%
1860	1,932	+14.5%
1870	1,845	−4.5%
1880	2,008	+8.8%
1890	2,201	+9.6%
1900	2,478	+12.6%
1910	2,564	+3.5%
1920	2,461	−4.0%
1930	2,897	+17.7%
1940	2,963	+2.3%
1950	3,601	+21.5%
1960	3,958	+9.9%
1970	6,095	+54.0%
1980	6,334	+3.9%
1990	6,661	+5.2%
2000	7,380	+10.8%
2010	8,055	+9.1%
2020	8,441	+4.8%
2024*	8,993	+6.5%
* = population estimate. Source: United States census records and Population Estimates Program data.

As of the 2020 United States Census, there were 8,441 people living in 2,619 households in the town. The population density was 307.3 inhabitants per square mile (118.6/km^{2}). There were 2,788 housing units at an average density of 100.6 per square mile (38.8/km^{2}). The racial makeup of the town was 82.1% White alone, 5.4% Black alone, 0.8% Asian alone, 0.2% American Indian and Alaska Native alone. 9.7% of the population reported two or more races. 11.7% of the population reported Hispanic or Latino origin.

There were 2,619 households. Of those households 60.2% were married couples living together, 6.3% were cohabitating couples, 20.8% were a female householder with no spouse or partner, and 14.4% were a male householder with no spouse or partner. 32.3% of all households included children under 18 years of age: 22.9% of those households with married householders, 2.0% of those with a cohabitating householders, 2.9% of those with a female householder without a spouse or partner, and 1.3% of those with a male householder and no spouse or partner. Of the 2,619 occupied housing units, 81.5% were owner-occupied housing and 18.5% were renter-occupied housing.

The 2024 American Community Survey reported that 19.2% of the population was under 18 years old; 19.9% was 65 years old or older. The median age was 43.1 years. For every 100 females, there were 120.9 males. For every 100 females age 18 and over, there were 131.0 males.

The 2024 American Community Survey reported that the median income for a household in the town was $134,833, and the median income for a family was $134,792. 21.6% of households, and 29.0% of households with married householders, had a household income of $200,000 or more. Households with a householder 65 years of age or older had a median income in the past 12 months of $67,401. Males 16 years and older with earnings in the past 12 months had median earnings of $75,032 versus $61,339 for females. About 1.7% of families and 1.4% of the population were below the poverty line, including 0.0% of those with children under age 18 and 0.0% of those with a householder 65 years of age or over.

== Government ==
State government
State Representative(s):	Meghan Kilcoyne (D) (12th Worcester district)
State Senator(s):	John J. Cronin (D) (Worcester and Middlesex district)
Governor's Councilor(s):	Paul DePalo (D) (District 7)
Federal government
U.S. Representative(s):	Lori Trahan (D) (3rd district)
U.S. Senators:	Elizabeth Warren (D), Ed Markey (D)

== Education ==
Lancaster is served by the Nashoba Regional School District. The town is also served by Minuteman Regional Technical High School It is also the site of the former Atlantic Union College and of South Lancaster Academy, incorporated in 1882–1883. The Dr. Franklin Perkins School is a private special education school located in the town. Trivium School, founded in 1979, is a private Catholic college preparatory school occupying the former estate of E. V. R. Thayer Jr.

== Library ==
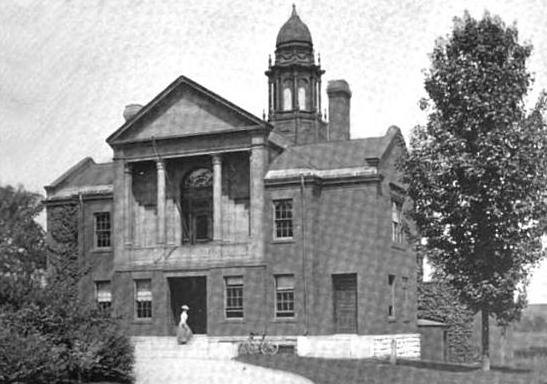
Lancaster public library, 1899

Lancaster's public Thayer Memorial Library first opened in 1868. In fiscal year 2025, the town of Lancaster spent 1.64% ($451,814) of its general fund budget on its public library - approximately $51 per town resident for that year.

== Infrastructure ==
=== Transportation ===
Lancaster is accessible via Exit 17 on US Interstate Highway 190. On Massachusetts Route 2, Lancaster is accessible via two exits: Lunenburg Road is Exit 103 and Shirley Road is Exit 105.

Lancaster is served by the Montachusett Area Regional Transit Authority (MRTA) but there is no longer a fixed bus stop located in town. Residents have access to the "MART Connects" on-demand taxi and livery service for trips of up to 20 miles; it can be scheduled by phone.

=== Utilities ===
The electric utility provider for delivery in Lancaster is National Grid. For supply, residents can use the supplier National Grid contracts with, contract with a supplier on their own, or participate in the town's Municipal Aggregation Program. The town contracts with Colonial Power Group to administer its Municipal Aggregation Program.

Water in Lancaster is supplied via several town wells operated by the town Water Department. Properties in the north of town - typically on or north of Lunenburg Road - are currently not served by the town water supply and rely on private wells.

Some streets in Lancaster - largely those closest to Clinton but including Main Street to Massachusetts Route 117 - have access to a sewer system operated by the Lancaster Sewer District Commission.

Cable television in Lancaster is exclusively provided by Xfinity. Terrestrial broadband internet service is provided by Xfinity; Verizon FIOS also serves limited areas of town.

== Notable people ==
- Herman Vandenburg Ames, dean of the University of Pennsylvania graduate school
- James Atherton, pioneer and the namesake of Atherton Bridge
- Frank Bancroft, Baseball manager
- Luther Burbank, botanist, horticulturist and a pioneer in agricultural science
- Ezra Butler, United States Representative from Vermont
- James C. Carter, New York City lawyer
- Charles F. Chandler, chemist
- Horace Cleveland, landscape architect
- Francis B. Fay, merchant and politician
- Hannah Flagg Gould, poet
- Stephen N. Haskell, clergyman and pioneering leader of the Seventh-day Adventist denomination, founded South Lancaster Academy
- Caroline Lee Hentz, novelist
- Henrietta Swan Leavitt, astronomer who discovered the relation between the luminosity and the period of Cepheid variable stars
- Charles W. Moors, Wisconsin politician
- Herbert Parker (Massachusetts politician), Republican politician, Massachusetts Attorney General from 1902 to 1906
- Mary Rowlandson, colonial Indian captive and author of one of America's first best selling books
- Jared Sparks, historian, Harvard University president (taught at a private school in Lancaster 1815–1817)
- John Thayer, ornithologist
- Nathaniel Thayer, Unitarian congregational minister
- Nathaniel Thayer (Jr.), financier and philanthropist
- Dr. Samuel Willard, representative to the Massachusetts ratification of the United States Constitution
