= History of Dedham, Massachusetts, 1800–1899 =

The history of Dedham, Massachusetts, from 1800 to 1899 saw growth and change come to the town. In fact, the town changed as much during the first few decades of the 19th century as it did in all of its previous history.

Having been named Dedham shiretown of the newly formed Norfolk County in 1793, the town got an influx of new residents and visitors. This growth was aided by new turnpikes and railroads, with taverns popping up to serve travelers. In the 19th century many former farms became businesses and homes for those who commuted into Boston. The population of the town more than tripled in this period.

The Town government expanded dramatically with the institution of the public library, the police department, fire department, and others. St. Mary's Church was established, with William B. Gould doing the plaster work. The congregation at St. Paul's constructed a number of churches, and First Church suffered a schism. A number of schools were established, including Dedham High School. The Town was central to two major court cases, the Fairbanks Case and the Dedham Case.

The "scenery" of the town was described as "varied and picturesque" with "an appearance of being well kept." Several new towns broke away, including Dover, Westwood, and Norwood.

== Local government ==
The Dedham Public Library was established in 1872 and first occupied rented space at the corner of Court Street and Norfolk Street. It built a permanent home in 1886 at the corner of Church and Norfolk Streets using funds left by Hannah Shuttleworth. The building, made of Dedham Granite and trimmed with red sandstone, opened in 1888. The Dedham Infirmary, also known as the Poor Farm, built a home on Elm Street in 1898. It closed in February 1954.

The Dedham Water Company was chartered in 1882. Gas streetlights were introduced in 1869 and were followed by electric lights in 1890.

The first police officers were appointed in 1876 and worked each day from 4 p.m. to 2 a.m. The police department was originally housed on the first floor of Memorial Hall. In 1894, it was proposed that the police and fire departments be housed in the same building, but this did take place until 2023.

=== Fire Department ===
A fire truck made by Paul Revere was purchased by a group of citizens and donated to the Town in 1800 as "a public utility and a very great security against the calamities of fire." It was known as Hero No. 1. It was stationed at the Connecticut Corner firehouse. A second hand tub, the Good Intent No. 2, was purchased in 1802 and stationed in the central village. The third engine, the Enterprise, was purchased in 1826.

In 1831, Town Meeting purchased eight more engines, including the Niagara and Water Witch. These two, together with the Hero, Good Intent, and Enterprise, were all located in the First Parish. The first steam engine was purchased in 1872.

Each engine had its own company of men attached to it and keen was the rivalry existing between the organizations. The Norfolk House was often selected for the annual meetings and dinners of the different companies for the next 40 years.

A firehouse in East Dedham was constructed in 1846 on Milton Street near the Old Stone Mill. It was used until 1897, when the firehouse on Bussey Street was constructed. Hose Number 3 (Note: Hose No. 3, which had 300' of house, was built by J.V. Fell, J. Wally & Brother, and J. Lynas.) was purchased by the town for the Milton Street station in 1891 and then moved to the Bussey Street location. That building also housed a supply wagon.

The central fire house was built at the corner of Washington and Bryant Streets. It housed Steamer Number 1, Hose Number 1, and Hook and Ladder Number 1. Both Hose Number 1, which carried 1,000' of hose, and Hook and Ladder Number 1, were drawn by two horses.

=== Selectmen ===
Selectmen were elected by neighborhood, not town-wide; East Dedham was not afforded their own selectman.

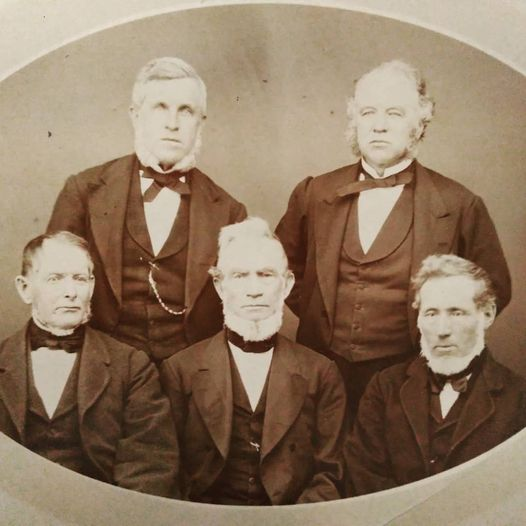
The Dedham Board of Selectmen. Clockwise from top left: Benjamin Weatherbee, Augustus Bradford Endicott, J. Bradford Baker, Ezra W. Taft, and Samuel E. Pond.

Year first elected	Selectman	Total years served	Notes
1813	Eliphalet Pond Jr.		(Note: His father was Eliphalet Pond. He was born in 1745 and was Registrar of Deeds in Norfolk County, Massachusetts from the establishment of the county in 1793 to his death in 1813. He also served as the Dedham, Massachusetts town clerk for 25 years and as a selectman for 1813. He also served as a colonel in the American Revolution.)

=== Town Clerks ===
Year first elected	Town Clerk	Total years served	Notes
1812	Josiah Daniell	3	
1815	Richard Ellis	29	
1824	John Bullard	1	
1845	Jonathan H. Cobb	3	
	Charles H. Farrington		(Note: Farrington was also a copyist at the Registry of Deeds. He was in a wheelchair due to a childhood affliction. He served as Clerk until his death.)

=== First townhouse ===
After the new courthouse was constructed in 1827, the old courthouse was sold to Harris Monroe and Erastus Worthington. The pair speculated that the Town may want to use it as a town hall, and so they dragged it south down Court Street to a new lot. The Town decided to build an entirely new structure, however, on Bullard Street in 1828. By 1858, however, a town committee was complaining that "the present town house is neither in location, size, or style, sufficient to meet the reasonable requirements of the town." It was too far away from the center village and too ugly they said, and though there were over 1,000 voters in the town the building could not accommodate more than 275. Town meetings were frequently crowded and confused in the townhouse, and it was difficult to hear speakers and determine votes.

=== Memorial Hall ===
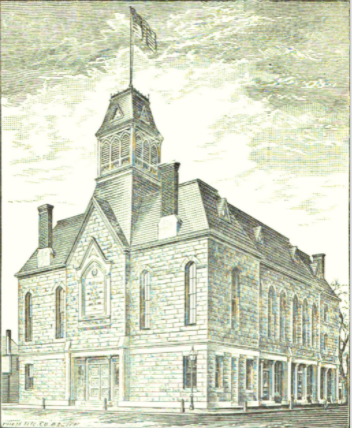
Memorial Hall

A committee decided that the first town hall was inadequate, but it remained standing for an additional eight years. Eventually, in 1867, it was decided that a new building should be erected to both house the town offices and to memorialize those who died in the Civil War. The firm of Ware and Van Brunt was hired to design the building, and they produced a "supremely Victorian plan" that recalled the "provincial town halls of England in outline and design." (Note: Ware and Van Brunt also designed the houses in Germantown in Dedham.)

Though Town Meeting had appropriated virtually unlimited funds for the project, a town committee tried to save money by cutting out several elements. The changes left it with a slightly unfinished appearance from the outside and an interior "utterly barren of all decent conveniences." It was described as Dedham's "monument alike to her dead soldiers and to living stupidity."

=== Brookdale Cemetery ===
For nearly 250 years after it was established, Old Village Cemetery was the only cemetery in Dedham. Seeing a need for greater space, the Annual Town Meeting of 1876 established a committee to look into establishing a new cemetery. Town Meeting accepted the committee's recommendation on October 20, 1877, and appropriated $8,150 to purchase more than 39 acres of land to establish Brookdale Cemetery.

== County, state, and federal government ==
In the 1812 Massachusetts gubernatorial election, Dedham voters cast 299 votes for Democratic-Republican Party Elbridge Gerry and 172 for Federalist candidate Caleb Strong. The Democratic-Republican Party gained 46 votes over the previous election but the Federalists gained 56. During the campaign, Dedham's Democrats held rallies to get out the vote on April 1, 1812, at Marsh's Tavern and April 2, 1812, at Lem Ellis' Tavern. All parts of town represented at the rallies except the South Parish.

By 1836, Dedham "had long been a focus for the vigorous political activity popularly associated with the Jacksonian era."

=== New courthouse ===
When it became apparent that the old County Courthouse was out of date, the Norfolk County Commissioners ordered a new one to be built. The old courthouse would become Temperance Hall.

The Commissioners originally were seeking a utilitarian building that would be fireproof and safe to store important documents. Local boosters, however, wanted a building that aligned with the town's rapidly improving self-image. The commissioners were persuaded that

something more was required... than what was barely necessary; that... the state of this County, rapidly advancing in wealth and prosperity, required a liberal and judiciously expenditure for public accommodation, and that acquiring a taste for the fine arts was intimately connected with a refinement of manners and even with moral sentiment; that a magnificent temple of Justice would inspire an elevation of mind and contribute to cherish those feelings of reverence for the administration of the laws which it is so desirable to cultivate in a free community; the as the situation was in the most handsome and conspicuous place in the town, the building should be made in accordance with the architectural spirit of the times and comporting with the dignity and taste of the citizens of the County.

The land for the courthouse, across the street from the existing one, was purchased from Frances Ames for $1,200. Masonic ceremonies, bell ringing and cannon fire accompanied the laying of the cornerstone on July 4, 1825. It was designed by Solomon Willard and built in the Greek style with pillared porticoes. Construction was completed in February 1827.

From the outside, it was an attractive building, but it was not a comfortable place to work. The only water was provided by a well on Court Street, and it did not have an adequate heating system. One employee complained that it was "barren and destitute of every convenience, demanded for health, comfort and decency."

Renovations in 1854 added gas lights to the building and running water from an on-site well. Six years later, in 1860, the building was fireproofed to protect county records. (Note: The original design had brick floors on top of a layer of salt covering a wooden subfloor, providing little protection from a fire originating in the cellar.) A group of citizens petitioned the commissioners, asking them not to make any structural changes for fear of ruining the exterior aesthetics of the building. Despite this, the Commission decided to extend the north front of the building, to add wings on either side, and add a large dome to the roof. (Note: It was rumored that the county saved money on the dome by using existing plans from the United States Customshouse in Providence.) Following plans developed by Gridley J. F. Bryant, the building was enlarged again between 1892 and 1895 to its present H-shaped configuration, adding wings to the southern facade that matched those added in 1863 to the north.

=== Representation in the General Court ===
Year	Representative	Representative	Representative	Senator	Notes
1800	Isaac Bullard				
1801	Isaac Bullard	Ebenezer Fisher			
1802	Ebenezer Fisher				
1803	Ebenezer Fisher				
1804	Ebenezer Fisher				
1805	Ebenezer Fisher	John Endicott			
1806	Ebenezer Fisher	John Endicott	Isaac Bullard		
1807	John Endicott	Isaac Bullard	Samuel H. Deane		
1808	John Endicott	Samuel H. Deane	Jonathan Richards		
1809	John Endicott	Samuel H. Deane	Jonathan Richards		
1810	John Endicott	Samuel H. Deane	Jonathan Richards		
1811	John Endicott	Samuel H. Deane	Jonathan Richards		
1812	John Endicott	Samuel H. Deane	Jonathan Richards		
1813	John Endicott	Samuel H. Deane	Jonathan Richards	James Richardson	
1814	John Endicott	Erastus Worthington	Abner Ellis		
1815	Erastus Worthington	Samuel H. Deane	Abner Ellis		
1816	John Endicott	William Ellis	Abner Ellis		
1817	Abner Ellis	William Ellis	Timothy Gay Jr.		
1818	William Ellis				
1819	William Ellis				
1820	William Ellis				
1821	Edward Dowse				
1822	John W. Ames				
1823	William Ellis	Abner Ellis	Pliny Bingham		
1824	William Ellis	Pliny Bingham	Josiah S. Fisher		
1825	Richard Ellis				
1826	Richard Ellis				
1827	Richard Ellis	Horace Mann			
1828	Richard Ellis	Horace Mann			
1829	Richard Ellis	Horace Mann			
1830	Richard Ellis				
1831	Theron Metcalf (in May)	Richard Ellis (in November)	Horace Mann (in November)		
1832	Theron Metcalf	John W. Ames			
1833	Theron Metcalf	Richard Ellis	John Morse		
1834	John Endicott	John Morse	Daniel Covell		
1835	William Ellis	Daniel Marsh	John Dean III		
1836	Joshua Fales	John Morse	Daniel Covell		
1837	Joshua Fales	John Morse	Daniel Covell		
1838	Joshua Fales				
1839	Joshua Fales				
1840	Joshua Fales				
1841	Merrill D. Ellis	Ezra W. Wilkinson			
1842	Merrill D. Ellis				
1843	Merrill D. Ellis				
1844	Joseph Day				
1845	Joseph Day				
1846	Edward L. Keyes				
1851	Ezra W. Wilkinson			Edward L. Keyes	
1852	Ezra W. Taft			Edward L. Keyes	
1856	Ezra W. Wilkinson				
1859	Ezra W. Taft				
1872	Augustus Bradford Endicott				
1873	Augustus Bradford Endicott				
1874	Augustus Bradford Endicott				
1892	George S. Winslow			William Francis Ray	

== Military and wars ==
=== Bursting of the Town cannon ===
In the mid-1800s, the town's 17th century cannon was ordered to be destroyed. The cannon was prepared for use during King Philip's War but was never used, and was ordered to be swung during the Revolution. Thomas Cobbett, who was a member of an artillery company when he was younger, dragged the cannon to a meadow far from the village, filled it with gunpowder and gravel, and then lit a long fuse. (Note: Cobbett was a carpenter who lived at the corner of School and Worthington Streets. He went to work for Horatio Clarke making flasks in the foundry in Mill Village (modern day East Dedham) and would retire to Hyde Park to live with his daughter, Georgianna and her husband, Henry Holtham.) Pieces of the cannon were then distributed to residents. One, which went to Horatio Clarke, was subsequently used to hold open the door of the grocery store at the corner of School and Washington Streets.

=== War of 1812 ===
While Massachusetts as a whole opposed the War of 1812, the people of Dedham largely supported it. Many in the Federalist press called it "unjustifiable," " needless," "bloody," "destructive," objectless," "and "Godless." Both houses of the Great and General Court passed resolutions opposing the war, and every county in Massachusetts except Norfolk held anti-war conventions. There were calls for a state convention to discuss ways to resist the war, but others said it would be unconstitutional and illegal. Governor Caleb Strong refused to call up the militia to protect the seacoast.

Dedham fully supported the war, and adopted resolutions at town meeting on July 20 calling it a "just and necessary war waged for the protection of our violated rights and liberties." Town Meeting "Resolved, that since Congress has thought it necessary to declare war for the protection of commerce, for the liberties of our citizen, for our national sovereignty and independence, for a republican form of government itself, we hesitate not to declare our firm resolution to prosecute it with all our energy."

On August 17, 1812, a convention was held at Marsh's Tavern to join the Suffolk and Middlesex conventions in their addresses to the president relating to the war. Though there was a downpour of rain, the meeting hall was filled with war supporters. Dr. Nathaniel Ames made frequent references to the war in his diary, including on the USS Constitution's battle with HMS Guerriere.

When news of victory in the war reached Dedham, the old town cannon was dragged to the First Church green to celebrate. Rev. Joshua Bates opposed the firing, so he went there with a bucket of water to douse the fuse before it could be lit. Pitt Butterfield, a republican and captain of the artillerists, "faced the church militant and in language more forcible than elegant gave the other party to understand that any interference with the loading or firing of the field piece would result in a fight then and there and that the broadcloth of a priest would not protect a meddling and domineering politician." Bates backed off. The cannon was fired.

==== Defense of Boston ====
By June 1814, the Royal Navy had established a blockade off the coast of Massachusetts. As people on the coast worried about the possibility of invasion, they moved their valuables inland. (Note: On the 11th, all the specie from the Massachusetts State Bank in Boston was removed to Worcester.) Seven loads of specie from the Union Bank and other goods from Boston were moved to the vault of the Dedham Bank. By September, large amounts of naval and military goods would be moved from Boston to Dedham for safekeeping.

On September 12, 1814, Dedham's militia marched to Boston to help in the defense.

==== US Army troops ====
In the spring of 1814 a "regiment of flying artillery" had their headquarters in Dedham and were recruiting men there. Ames wrote of a Federalist doctor on the staff of the regiment who he called "an internal enemy." Ames claimed the doctor opposed the war and wished every American soldier would die before they reached Canada.

In August 1815 a regiment arrived and encamped on the "Church lot (Swets) South of Mill Creek." The next moth, Ames recorded: "Vast militia parade these two days at Dedham. 1st division, Boston, Bellingham Cohasset – all meet at much expense and grumbling, only to salute a bareheaded General."

A number of Dedham soldiers fought, and some died, (Note: Including the father of Edward Holmes) in the Battle of Lundy's Lane during the War of 1812 under General Winfield Scott.

=== Powder House ===
In the mid-1800s, a group of boys pried open the doors of the powder house one winter day. They found kegs of stiff white card cartridges filled with damn powder and heavy bullets. There were also kegs filled with flints used in flintlock muskets.

The boys took the cartridges down to the meadows where fires burned for the benefit of the ice skaters nearby. The damp powder hissed and sizzled when thrown into the fires, and the bullets were melted down.

A proposal was made by Louis Bullard to turn the powder house into a memorial of prominent Dedhamites, with their names carved into the building. Nothing came of it.

=== The striped pig ===
In the early 1800s, the quarterly militia training days had become drunken and licentious affairs. In response, the General Court passed a law in 1838 that prohibited the sale of alcohol in quantities of less than 15 gallons on training days. Dedham, as the county seat, hosted a number of militia companies on training days.

A farmer from Dedham's Low Plains came to Common with a pig he said was striped by a zebra. For 6.25 cents, people could enter the tent to view the animal. With admission, everyone was entitled a free glass of rum or gin.

The incident upset many in the temperance movement and was the topic of a number of pamphlets. Within days, newspapers across the country ran stories about the striped pig. A popular song was also written about it. Entitled "The Dedham Muster, or the Striped Pig," it was set to the tune of King and Countryman and talks about how greedy water vendors charged so much on a hot day that soldiers instead turned to the striped pig tent to quench their thirst.

Public intoxication became known as "riding the striped pig" and the striped pig became a symbol of efforts to skirt the law. Temperance promoters began enacting laws against ruses to evade the law that were known as "striped pig devices." A political party, known as the Striped Pig Party, was formed to oppose anti-alcohol laws. A local meeting of the striped pig party met at the Norfolk Hotel just a month after the training day were the striped pig first appeared.

Taverns and public began adopting the name the Striped Pig, and people would argue about the proper direction of the stripes.

=== Civil War ===
Several days after the fall of Fort Sumter, a mass meeting was held in Temperance Hall which opened with a dramatic presentation of the American flag. A total of 47 men signed up to serve in the war at that meeting, forming Dedham's first military unit since the Dedham militia was disbanded in 1846. (Note: Worthington believed the last disbanded in 1842.) More men enlisted in the coming days and the first company was formed in early May.

The troops would march and maneuver through the streets of the village. When they did so, townspeople would come out to watch and young boys would often tag along. During one training session on the Common, a young recruit opened an umbrella when it began to sprinkle. The man, a barber who worked on Church Street, was told by Captain Onion that he could not march with an umbrella. He chose to leave instead, listening to the jeers of the men who remained. An effigy of the "man with the umbrella" appeared hanging from a noose several days later at the corner of Church and High Streets, and the young man quickly left town.

On September 3, 1864, the 18th Massachusetts Infantry Regiment was mustered out of service. It had participated in some 15 battles. Of the 58 who enlisted from Dedham, 11 had fallen in the field, six had died from disease and wounds received in battle, eight had been discharged by reason of wounds, and 13 by reason of disability resulting from wounds. Of the whole company, 23 men had either died or fallen in battle. The regiment bore a part in nearly all the general battles of the Army of the Potomac except those of the Peninsula before Richmond. Upon their return, Dedham welcomed them with fitting ceremonies.

The 35th Massachusetts Infantry Regiment saw nearly three years of active service, beginning almost with the day of their arrival in the field. On its colors were inscribed, by an order of General Meade, the names of 13 battles to which was afterwards added a 14th. Their campaigns were not limited by a state or a department. They fought in Kentucky, East Tennessee, and Mississippi, as well as in Maryland and Virginia. In many of their battles, their position was among the most exposed to the enemy and sometimes in the most deadly conflicts. It became a proverb among the soldiers that the commanding officer of the 35th was sure to be struck down in every engagement.

Of the 68 who enlisted from Dedham, six were killed in battle and one more died soon after of his wounds, five died in the service from disease, eight were discharged on account of their wounds, and eleven for disability. The Town desired to give them a public welcome home, but they declined the honor, saying they preferred to pass without ceremony from the life of the soldier to that of the citizen.

==== Support from home ====
The women of the town immediately began working on producing supplies for the troops at the outbreak of war. In a span of 24 hours, they sewed 100 flannel shirts, of which 60 were sent to the state and 40 were reserved for Dedham soldiers. In the next two weeks, they made an additional 140 shirts, 140 pairs of flannel underwear, 126 towels, 132 handkerchiefs, 24 hospital shirts, 70 pincushions, 70 bags, and a handful of needlebooks. During the war, several Dedhamites traveled to visit the soldiers in camp, and several in service received furloughs to visit home.

After the Second Battle of Bull Run, a messenger burst into a church on Sunday morning with news of the defeat. The service was halted, and churchgoers organized into work parties. Less than six hours later, two wagon loads of clothing, bandages, medicines, and other supplies were on their way to Boston to be loaded onto an emergency supply train.

On May 6, 1861, the Town voted to "stand by the volunteers and to protect their families during the war." The Town Meeting also appropriated $10,000 for the cause. A number of other similar votes took place in the coming years such that the town spent a total of $136,090.81 on outfitting the troops, supporting the families, and providing bonuses for soldiers who enlisted.

== Churches ==
In 1807, Nathaniel Ames discovered the Town was using the taxes he paid for the support of the church to pay the First Church's minister, and not his new Anglican church minister. The tax collector told him it was a bad law and refused to follow it, which prompted Ames to retort that he was as big of a tyrant as Napoleon Bonaparte.

Between 1825 and 1880, the first five churches were built in East Dedham.

=== First Church ===
Votes were taken in 1805 and 1807 to expand the meetinghouse, but nothing came from either effort.

Seeing the success the Anglican Church down the street had renting out land, First Church began renting out lots around the meetinghouse around the turn of the 19th century.

==== Ministers ====
First Church Minister	Years of service	Notes
Jason Haven	1756–1802	
Joshua Bates	March 16, 1803-February 20, 1818	
Alvan Lamson	October 29, 1818 – October 29, 1860	
Benjamin H. Bailey	March 14, 1861 – October 13, 1867	
George McKean Folsom	March 31, 1869 – July 1, 1875	
Seth Curtis Beach	December 29, 1875-	

As the years went on, Rev. Jason Haven's mental and physical condition continued to decline. He was frequently so beset with fevers, migraines, and coughing spells that he could not get out of bed. The prospect of hiring an assistant or a replacement was brought up time and again at parish meetings, but without a decision ever being made. Finally, Rev. Joshua Bates, a recent Harvard College graduate, was called to serve as associate pastor in April 1802. Fisher Ames served on the search committee, helping to explain why a Federalist minister was called to serve a congregation that was Democratic Republican by a ratio of 3 to 1.

Three months later, Haven died. On December 30, 1802, the parish met and debated whether or not Bates should be afforded the traditional lifetime contract. Nathaniel Ames, noting how unpopular Haven had become over the years, advocated for a trial period first. Fisher Ames made an eloquent speech of support and this was enough to issue a call. As a result, several members, including Nathaniel, left the church and became Episcopalians.

Bates was ordained on March 16, 1803 "before a very crowded, but a remarkably civil and brilliant assembly." The opposition to Bates was so intense that it seems some, including the newspapers, expected there to be some sort of protest at his ordination, but nothing ever materialized.

During his pastorate, the Lord's Supper was administered every six weeks. On the Thursdays preceding, he would preach the Preparatory Lecture. Students in the nearby school were marched to the meetinghouse to listen to the lecture, and Bates would visit the school on Mondays to quiz students on the catechism.

Politically, he was an ardent Federalist while the town and the church were strongly anti-Federalist. Though he was not as liberal as some had hoped, his sermons often were intolerant of those whose politics who differed from his own and were not well received. He believed Thomas Jefferson to be an infidel and that his followers were, at best, doubtful Christians. He was a "high-toned Calvinist school," and he was not particularly charitable towards those of other denominations. He also demonstrated a sense of superiority over his own flock. By 1808, Fisher Ames would have enough with Bates and would join Dedham's Anglican church.

Just after midnight on the Fourth of July, 1809, a group of Republicans dragged the old town cannon to just below Bates' bedroom window. They stuffed it with sod from his lawn and were about to set it off when Bates appeared in his nightshirt. Not recognizing him immediately, one celebrant yelled "Get out of the way, you old bugger, or you'll get your brains blown out!" Bates and his bucket of water convinced the crowd to leave, but they soon returned. They fired the cannon, which was more than 150 years old, and awoke Bates again to the sound of shattering windowpanes.

Several years later, the entire choir resigned, en masse. It is not clear why from the records, but Bates missed them and worked to get them back.

In 1818 he asked to be dismissed from the church to accept the presidency of Middlebury College. It is assumed that, due to his differing political beliefs and his politically tinged sermons, that many in the congregation were glad to let him go. His last sermon was delivered February 5, 1818. He was later go on to become Chaplain of the United States House of Representatives.

==== Split at First Church ====
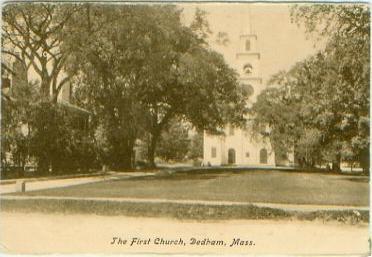
The First Church of Dedham and church green.

The First Church and Parish in Dedham split in 1818 over a dispute about who should become the next minister. At the time, all Massachusetts towns were Constitutionally required to tax their citizens "for the institution of the public worship of God, and for the support and maintenance of public Protestant teachers of piety." All residents of a town were assessed, as members of the parish, whether or not they were also members of the church. The "previous and long standing practice [was to have] the church vote for the minister and the parish sanction this vote."

In 1818, "Dedham [claimed] rights distinct from the church and against the vote of the church." The town, as the parish, selected a liberal Unitarian minister, Rev. Alvan Lamson, to serve the First Church in Dedham. The members of the church were more traditional and rejected Lamson by a vote of 18–14. When the parish installed and ordained Lamson the majority of the Church left "with Deacon [Samuel] Fales who took parish records, funds and silver with him." The parish, along with the members of the church who remained, installed their own deacons and sued to reclaim the church property.

With the Congregational Church established as the state religion in Massachusetts at the time, the dispute would reache the Massachusetts Supreme Judicial Court. The court ruled that "[w]hatever the usage in settling ministers, the Bill of Rights of 1780 secures to towns, not to churches, the right to elect the minister, in the last resort." The case was a major milestone in the road towards the separation of church and state and led to the Commonwealth formally disestablishing the Congregational Church in 1833.

The breakaway members formed the Allin Congregational Church across the street from the First Church. The remaining members of First Church renovated their meetinghouse and moved the front door to face the church green, and away from the Allin Church in 1820. In 1888, on the 250th anniversary of the church, a joint service was held in First Church in the afternoon, followed by a social reunion, and then a second service at the Allin church.

=== Episcopal churches ===
==== St. Paul's ====
Anglican Church Minister	Years of service	Notes
William Montague	1794–1818	
Samuel B. Babcock	1830s	

In 1791, the congregation regrouped after the American Revolution and called William Montague away from Old North Church. Montague received a salary of £100 sterling. He remained in the Dedham church until 1818. (Note: Burgess has his departure as being in 1815.)

When the church began leasing out land, it offered a flat rate for the first seven years which would then be adjusted for the subsequent years. Many of the tenants refused to pay the increases, however, and the church evicted them.

The 1798 Episcopal church in Franklin Square was replaced by a new building at the corner of Court Street and Village Ave. It was 90' long and had a bell tower in front that was 100' high. The builders, Thomas and Nathan Phillips, were from Dedham. Designed by Arthur Gilman after Magdalen College, Oxford, it was consecrated in 1845 but burned down in 1856.

The fourth church was completed in 1858 with a bell tower added in 1869. The bell was donated by Ira Cleveland. One minister, Rev. Samuel B. Babcock, served as rector in three buildings from 1834 to 1873. A chapel was added later, built with a bequest from George E. Hutton.

==== Good Shepherd ====
Lay readers from St. Paul's began ministering to Episcopalians in the Oakdale section of town in 1873 who could not get to the church easily. Out of their efforts grew the Church of the Good Shepherd, which was dedicated in 1876. One of the early members was William B. Gould.

=== Catholic churches ===
==== St. Mary's ====
In 1843, 85 years after the Acadians arrived, the first Catholic Mass was said in Daniel Slattery's home where the police station stood in Dedham Square from the 1960s until 2023. For the next three years after that first Mass with eight Catholics present, John Dagget, Slattery's brother in law, would drive to Waltham each Sunday and bring Father James Strain to Dedham to say Mass. In 1846 Dedham became part of the mission of St. Jospeph's Church in Roxbury and Father Patrick O'Beirne would celebrate Mass in Temperance Hall.

Large number of Irish immigrants fled the Great Famine a few years later and many of them settled in Dedham. By 1857 so many had settled that Father O'Beirne built the first Catholic church in Dedham, St Mary's Parish. When the Civil War broke out in 1861 Dedham men from all religious persuasions responded to the call but "no church in Dedham lost so many men in proportion to their numbers" as St. Mary's had.

In 1880 the current church was built on High Street, next to the rectory that had been purchased three years earlier. Thousands attend the laying of the cornerstone by Archbishop John J. Williams and a special train was run from Boston to accommodate all those who wished to be present. The master of ceremonies was Fr. Theodore A. Metcalf, a descendant of Michaell Metcalfe, an educator. Theodore Metcalf may also have been a descendant of Jonathan Fairbanks. At the time St. Mary's, "a fine stone church at a cost of about $125,000" was completed there was a Methodist, two Baptist, two Congregationalist, two Unitarian, and two Episcopal churches in Dedham.

It was also in 1880 that the Town Meeting set aside of the town cemetery, Brookdale, for Catholics to be buried in. The following year two Protestant businessmen gave great financial support to the fledgling parish. John R. Bullard contributed the Dedham granite used to construct the great upper church. Albert W. Nickerson paid off the debt still remaining on the old church and contributed $10,000 to help complete the new one.

==== St. Raphael's ====
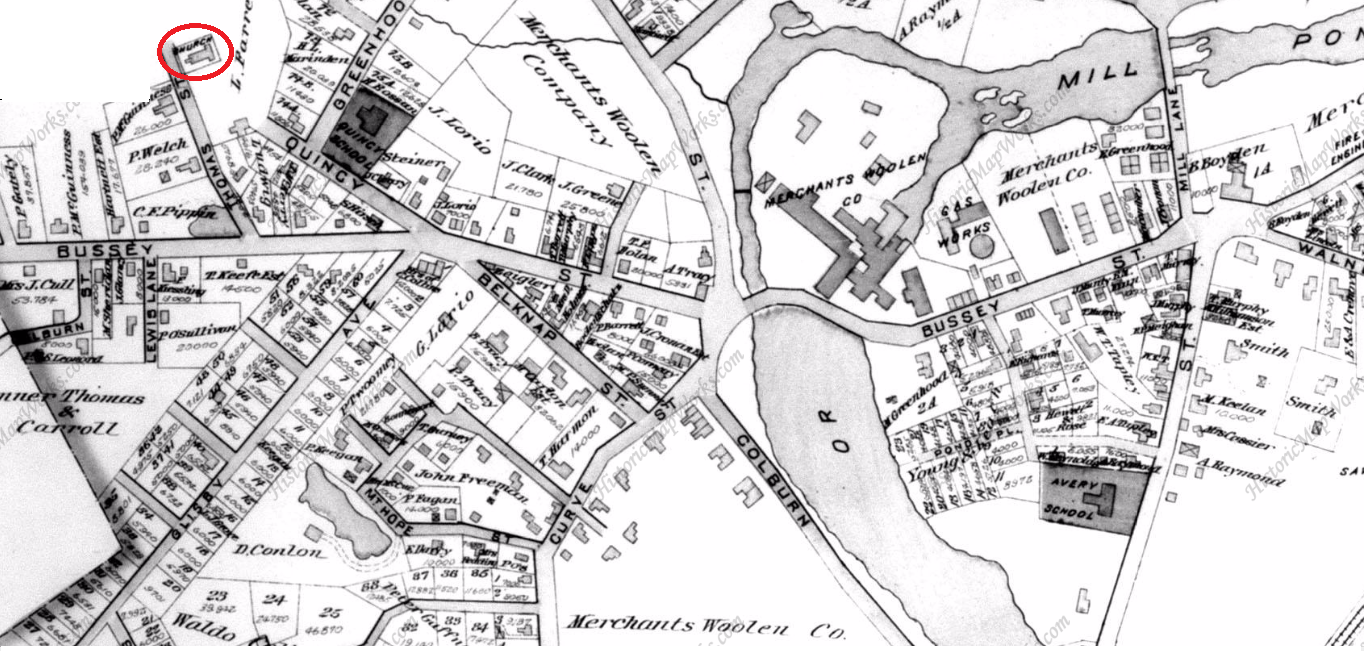
A map from 1888 showing St. Raphael's Church in a red circle at top left

Due to the growth of the Catholic population, about 200 parishioners in East Dedham were reassigned in January 1878 to Father Richard Barry's care in the Germantown Association's Chapel (St. Theresa's Church) in West Roxbury. This left St. Mary's parish small and with few resources.

On October 28, 1878, St. Raphael's Chapel was established on Thomas Street in East Dedham with the territory that had been broken off from St. Mary's. Dedicated by Archbishop Williams, St. Raphael's sat about 400 people, and in 1880 they added a hall for the amusement of young men at a cost of $8,000.

Many were not pleased with the change, and the first mass was attended by only six people. A petition was presented to Archbishop Williams asking him to reunite the parishes, and proposing to transform the chapel that had been erected into a school. After it burned to the ground on December 17, 1879, St. Raphael's was merged back into St. Mary's. The Catholics of Dedham were reunited in 1880.

The new parish sponsored Court 26 of the Catholic Orders of Foresters. The Court survived the Church, staying active at least into the 1920s.

=== Methodist ===
Beginning in 1818, itinerant Methodist ministers held services in private homes in Dedham. The first resident pastor, Rev. Joseph Pond, arrived in 1842 and a church was completed in 1843 on Milton Street near the intersection with Walnut Street. (Note: Membership in the church grew steadily for more than 50 years and in 1907 the congregation opened a new church in Oakdale Square.)

=== Baptist ===
The first Baptist church was opened in 1843 near Maverick Street, but meetings had been held for years prior beginning in 1822. A new church was built at the corner of Milton and Myrtle Streets in 1852.

=== Other churches ===
Rev. Calvin Durfee (Note: Durfee also served on the school committee in the mid-1800s.) was minister of the South Parish in 1836 and Rev. John White was at the West Parish.

Over the course of his career, William H. Mann was the organist at St. Paul's, the First Church and Parish in Dedham, and at the Baptist Church in East Dedham. (Note: Mann lived on Court Street. He learned the trade of a printer and in his later years he was a bookkeeper at the Maverick Woolen Mills.)

The YMCA opened a reading room near Dedham station in 1881.

== Residents ==
=== Population ===
The population grew dramatically in the 19th century, particularly after the Civil War, largely by immigrants seeking work in the mills along Mother Brook. They brought new ideas, customs, and languages to a town that had been relatively static since its inception in 1636.

Historical population

Year	Pop.
1637	31 men, plus their families
1640	>200
1648	~400
1651	~100 families
Late 1650s	150+ men, plus others
1666	83 legal voters
1686	>600
1700	700–<750 (Note: In 1711, there were 45 families living north of the Charles River.)
1736	1,200
1750	1,500–1,600
1761	<1,900
1765	1,919
1775	>2,000
1790	1,659
1800	1,973

Year	Pop.
1801	2,000
1830	3,057
1837	3,532
1850	4,447
1860	6,330
1865	7,198 (Note: 27% of the population was foreign-born, and 75% of them were from Ireland. The other 25% were German-speaking.)
1870	7,342
1880	6,233
1888	6,641 (Note: In 1880, the population of East Dedham was 3,600.)
1890	7,123
1892	>7,000
1895	7,211
1899	6,641 (Note: The population decreased in 1897 when Westwood separated and became its own town. The proportion of foreign-born residents then grew to more than 28%.)
1900	7,457
1908	7,774

Year	Pop.
1910	6,641
1915	9,284
1920	10,782
1930	11,043
1940	15,136
1950	15,508
1960	18,407
1970	23,869
1980	26,938
1990	25,298
2000	23,782
2002	23,378
2010	24,729
2020	25,364
2023	24,968

=== Race and ethnicity ===
In the mid-1800s, there were only a few non-white families in town. One student remembers only two black classmates at the Centre School during this time: Sara Robbins, the daughter or granddaughter of Seth Robbins, and Sam Johnson, the grandson of Mott Johnson. There was also only one Irish student, Patrick "Pat Slat" Slattery.

A black family lived at the corner of Washington Street and Wilson's Lane (modern day Worthington Street). The father was a whitewasher and was assisted by his son, who also had a great musical talent. They were very social with the boys of the neighborhood, although practical jokes were played on the family, including lighting a quantity of gunpowder placed under one of their beds on the morning of the Fourth of July.

=== New Dedhamites ===
When Dedham became the seat of Norfolk County in 1793, there was an influx of educated and professional men to town. Thy brought with them new ideas, energy, and capital, but the town had limited resources to make use of them. By 1827, Erastus Worthington noted that "Dedham is deficient in the want of sufficient liberality towards men of active and independent minds."

=== Immigrants ===
The largest group of immigrants moving to Dedham, comprising 75% of new arrivals, were the Irish who fled the Great Famine. The second largest group were Germans who moved to the area in large numbers beginning in the 1850s. Later in the century, large numbers of Italians and Eastern Europeans moved to Dedham. The immigrants were overwhelmingly Catholic.

Neighborhoods were often segregated by national origin. In the area between Bussey and Washington Streets, the Germans congregated on Shiller Road and Goethe Street. Many Irish lived on Maverick, Colburn, and Curve streets. Curve Street also had a number of Canadians. Many immigrants lived in tenements and boarding houses owned by the mills along Mother Brook.

When the mills closed and sold off their assets, many of the dilapidated boarding houses and tenements were bought by immigrants or their children. They often fixed them up and rented them out to those with the same background. Many, such as 235 Colburn Street, are still standing as of 2024.

==== Irish ====
The Irish were the first immigrant group to arrive in Dedham in large numbers. They started coming in the 1830s, and the numbers increased in the 1840s with the Potato Famine. As they were poor, had little education, few job prospects, and no experience in non-agricultural jobs, as well as being used to the dehumanizing treatment they received from British absentee landlords, they were often exploited by the mill owners where they worked on Mother Brook. They were employed in the most menial tasks at the mills.

Before the Irish arrived in Dedham, there were few in any Catholics in town. By 1865, a third of the population was foreign-born, and 75% of them were Irish.

Thomas Murphy, an Irish immigrant who lived at 27 Myrtle Street from 1872 to 1907, rose from working in the woolen mills to becoming Superintendent of Streets and then a real estate developer. (Note: Murphy was described as a "leading republican politician in Norfolk County" and a friend of Henry Cabot Lodge.) He developed and then rented and sold many homes in the Hill Avenue area to fellow Irish immigrants.

==== Germans ====
In the 1850s, German speakers were the next large group of immigrants to arrive in Dedham, also largely to work in the mills along Mother Brook. In 1865, 25% of immigrants in Dedham were German.

Unlike the Irish, they tended to be better educated and thus were able to get higher paying jobs. The technical jobs they filled in the mills included loom fixing, color mixing and dyeing, and working in the machine shop. However, they did face a language barrier.

The Germantown they established was north of the mills, on the East Dedham-West Roxbury border. There, the streets still have names including Bismark, Berlin, Schiller, and Goethe. In the neighborhood were German organizations such as the Germania Singing Society on Rockland Street.

This was a planned community, created by the German Quincy Homestead Association, a building and loan association promoted by Edward Everett Hale and Josiah Quincy, Jr. Quincy suggested a plan, and 27 Germans formed the association. They bought 60 acres from the Whiting family at $125 an acre and made Quincy the trustee. He laid out half acre lots and built 10 houses which were rented for $6 a week. The houses were designed by Edmund Quincy and the firm of firm of Ware and Van Brunt. (Note: Ware and Van Brunt also designed Memorial Hall.)

Two acres were set aside as a park and the Quincy School was built in the neighborhood on one of the lots. Other lots were sold to a few Irish families and outside investors. By 1885, 100 lots had been sold.

==== Others ====
Immigrants from many other countries, including Austria, Canada, Italy, Poland, Russia, Scotland, and Syria, among others from South and East Europe. Those from Quebec were recruited in Francophone newspapers as they were seen as hard workers and not troublesome.

The Italians tended to settle around East Street, between High Street and Washington Street. They planted several vegetable gardens, and many of the grape arbors they planted were still standing across East Dedham in 2024. They were seen as "aliens," however, and the Town's policy regarding them moving so close to Dedham Square was to "Sit Tight."

There were thousands of immigrants and their children living along Washington Street between Dedham Square and East Dedham in the last part of the century. They were almost all connected, either directly or indirectly, with the mills on Mother Brook.

=== Alcott ===
Louisa May Alcott's mother, Abba, ran an "intelligence office" to help the destitute find employment. When James Richardson came to Abba seeking a companion for his frail sister who could also help out with some light housekeeping, Alcott volunteered to serve in the house filled with book, music, artwork, and good company on Highland Avenue. Alcott imagined the experience as something akin to being a heroine in a Gothic novel as Richardson described their home in a letter as stately but decrepit.

His sister, Elizabeth, was 40 years old and suffered from neuralgia. Elizabeth was shy and did not seem to have much use for Alcott. Instead, Richardson spent hours reading her poetry and treating her like his confidant and companion, sharing his personal thoughts and feelings with her. Alcott reminded Richardson that she was supposed to be Elizabeth's companion, not his, and she was tired of listening to his "philosophical, metaphysical, and sentimental rubbish." He responded by assigning her more laborious duties, including chopping wood and scrubbing the floors.

She quit after seven weeks in the winter of 1851, when neither of two girls her mother sent to replace her decided to take the job. As she walked from his home to Dedham station, she opened the envelope he handed her with her pay. She was so unsatisfied with the four dollars she found inside that Aloctt family tradition states that she mailed in back to him in contempt.

She later wrote a slightly fictionalized account of her time in Dedham titled How I went into service, which she submitted to Boston publisher James T. Fields. He rejected the piece, telling Alcott that she had no future as a writer.

=== Browns ===
In 1847, a successful dry-goods merchant in Boston moved to Dedham with his wife. Charles Brown and Mary Patterson Shaw (Note: Charles lived from 1797 to 1869 and Mary from 1802 to 1883. Their portraits hang in the Dedham Historical Society among some other of their possessions and papers.) built a home at the corner of East Street and Auburn Street, modern day Whiting Avenue. It was described as "one of the most commanding positions in the town." At a cost of $18,264, it was one of the most expensive home in the Greater Boston area. After Mary died in 1886, it was purchased by the Boston Children's Friend Society as a home for boys. (Note: It would go on to become the home of the American Legion in 1921, and then the administration offices for the Dedham Public Schools in 1951. It was torn down in 2004 to make room for the new Dedham Middle School.)

=== Goulds ===
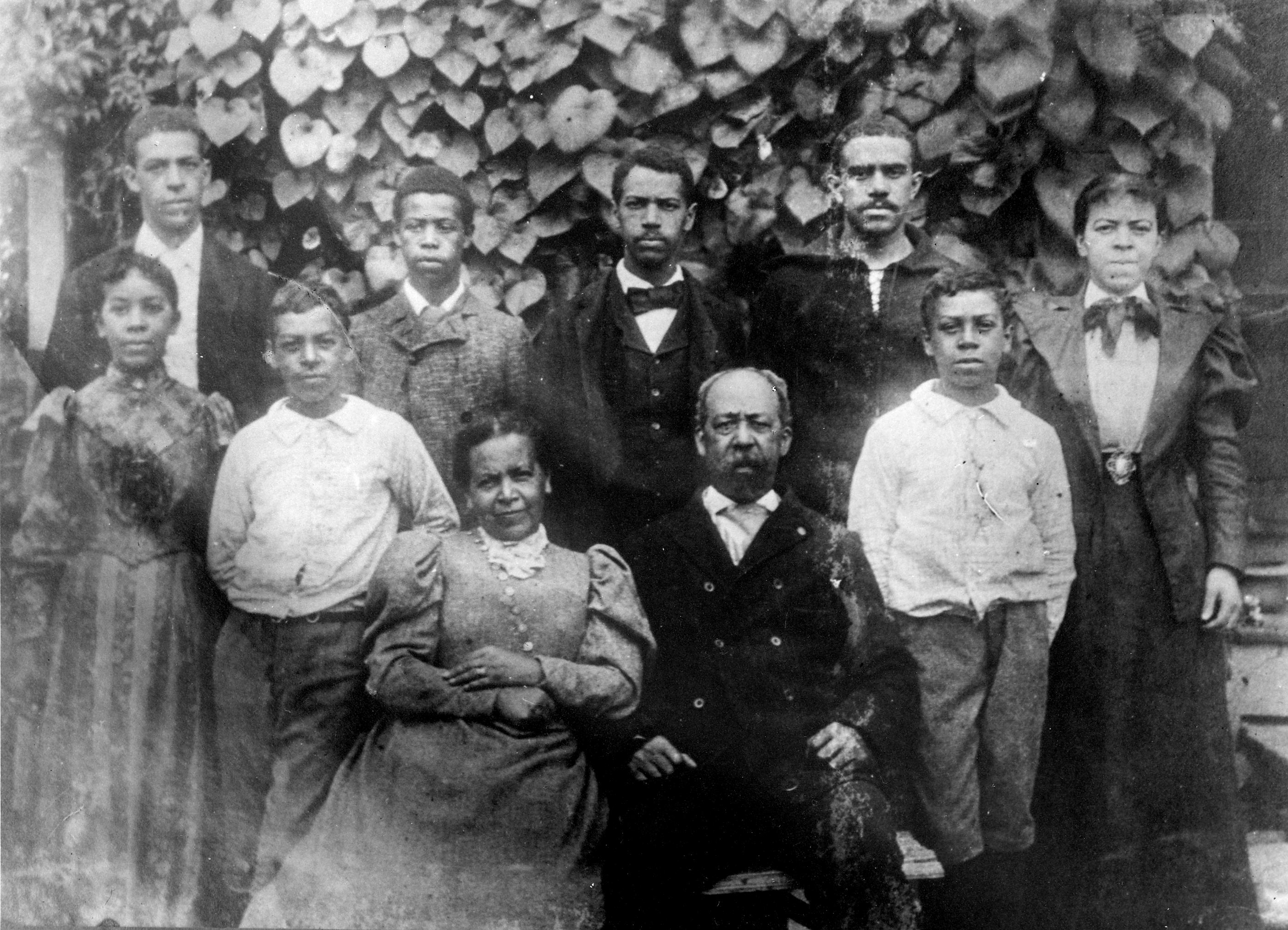
William and Cornelia Gould with their children.

After the Civil War, the formerly enslaved Naval veteran William B. Gould settled in Dedham with his wife, Cornelia, who had been purchased out of slavery before the war. Together they had six sons and two daughters and raised them on Milton Street in East Dedham. While living in Dedham, Gould became a building contractor and community pillar. He did the plaster work at St. Mary's Church, was a founder of the Church of the Good Shepherd, and was extremely active in the Grand Army of the Republic's Charles W. Carroll Post 144.

When he died in 1923 at the age of 85, he was interred at Brookdale Cemetery. The Dedham Transcript reported his death under the headline "East Dedham Mourns Faithful Soldier and Always Loyal Citizen: Death Came Very Suddenly to William B. Gould, Veteran of the Civil War." A statue of him was unveiled on Milton Street to mark the 100th anniversary of his death during Memorial Day 2023.

=== Mann ===
During the 1800s Dedham became the summer home of many wealthy Bostonians and, with the Industrial Revolution, many immigrants to the United States. One of the new residents of Dedham was Horace Mann, who lived for several years at the Norfolk House and opened a law office in December 1823. He soon "became interested in town affairs, was often chosen Moderator of the town meetings, and was an early candidate for office." Mann served as Dedham's Representative in General Court from 1827 to 1832 as well as on the School Committee. In only his first year in Dedham he was invited to deliver the Independence Day address. In his speech he "outlined for the first time the basic principles that he would return to in his subsequent public statements, arguing that education, intelligent use of the elective franchise, and religious freedom are the means by which American liberties are preserved." Former President and then Congressman John Quincy Adams later read the address and "expressed great confidence in the future career of Mr. Mann."

=== Nickerson ===
Albert W. Nickerson first arrived in Dedham in 1877. He was the president of Arlington Mills in Lawrence and director of the Atchison, Topeka and Santa Fe Railway and built a home near Connecticut Corner where he "took an active part in community affairs and made generous donations to charitable causes." He sold the house to his brother George when he had a dispute with the town over taxes and improvements he wished to make to the property a few years later and moved to an estate on Buzzards Bay. Nickerson entertained President Grover Cleveland here and helped convince him to purchase the adjoining estate Grey Gables.

Several years later he bought another parcel in Dedham, this time a 600-acre (2.4 km^{2}) estate on the Charles known as Riverdale. The estate was the boyhood home of ambassador and historian John Lothrop Motley. In 1886, he commission the architectural firm of Henry Hobson Richardson to build him a castle on the estate and hired Frederick Law Olmsted's firm to do the landscaping. The castle has a number of interesting architectural elements but its most famous is by far its numerous secret passages and "legendary underground mazes and hallways." It was built on top of a rocky hill "so that the Castle and the River appeared magically to carriages or cars arriving through the forested Pine Street entrance."

== Economy ==
Early in the 19th century Dedham become a transportation hub and the "existence of quick freight service promoted a burst of industrial development." By the 200th anniversary of the town's incorporation in 1836, Dedham was "a thriving commercial and manufacturing center." Within 50 years of the railroads' arrival in 1836, the population almost doubled to 6,641.

=== Agriculture ===
In 1888, the 97 farms in town produced a product valued at $5,273,965, up from only $192,294 in 1885.

=== Banks ===
The Dedham Bank was founded in Dedham in 1814 and asked Nathaniel Ames to be a director. Ames declined, citing the large number of lawyers involved with its creation. Ten months after creation, however, the bank had 66 shareholders in Dedham, Boston, Bellingham, Medway, Dover, Walpole, Franklin, Needham, Woburn, Roxbury, Medfield, Sharon, Wrentham, Hopkington, Bridgewater, Canton, and Sherburne. There was an attempted burglary of the Dedham Bank in 1863 with the would-be thieves using gunpowder.

The two major banks at the end of the century were the Dedham National Bank, with over $300,000 in capital, and the Dedham Institution for Savings, with more than $2,000,000 in deposits.

=== Connecticut Corner ===
In 1800, a group of tinsmiths from Connecticut, including Calvin Whiting (Note: Whiting also owned a company that delivered fresh water to homes via hollowed out logs. He also was a stockholder in the Norfolk Cotton Manufactory.) and Eli Parsons, began a business at the corner of Lowder and High Streets. They attracted additional businesses, including a dry good store. The area became known as Connecticut Corner. (Note: The term Connecticut Corner has generally fallen out of use in Dedham, but it is listed as a historic district in Dedham. The historic district generally runs down High and Bridge Streets from slightly past Lowder Street to slightly past Common Street. It encompasses the Town Common and the houses around it.) In 1833, the Russel and Baker furniture company moved into the area but, after two bad fires, moved downtown in 1853. It employed 500 people.

Benjamin Bussey amassed 150 acres in the area.

=== Dedham Pottery ===
Hugh C. Robertson moved the Dedham Pottery plant from Chelsea to Dedham in 1896. The architect of the building, who also served on the company's board, was Alexander Wadsworth Longfellow Jr. The plant, which rarely if ever employed more than six people at a time, was located on Pottery Lane, off High Street, where the 2012 Avery School stands. The company closed in 1942 and the building burned to the ground in the 1970s. Maude Davenport, who was raised on Greenlodge Street in Dedham, is regarded as the company's most skilled decorator.

=== East Dedham ===
In 1825, East Dedham had a valuation of $55,000, of which $22,000 came from a mill along Mother Brook. There were 20 houses, 30 school children, and no churches. By 1880, thanks in large part to Thomas Barrows, the valuation was $2.5 million, the population was 3,600, and there were five church buildings.

In July 1872, the Dedham Transcript reported that the "sound of carpenters' hammers is heard on every side... The greater part of the building is carried on in Germantown and Oak Dale.... In visiting Dedham village lately we were impressed with the deathlike stillness of the streets...., contrasting it with the ever-increasing and wide-awake East Dedham. It requires no great penetration to know where the energetic enterprises of the town are."

By the end of the century, the intersection of High Street, Bussey Street, Saw Mill Lane, and Milton Street had a bakery, a barber, a blacksmith, a carpenter, a dentist, a florist, several grocery stores, (Note: One was owned by William T. Tapley, and was below Mechanic's Hall.) an insurance agency, a lawyer, a lumberyard, a newsstand, a photographer, a shoe store, stables, and an undertaker. Benjamin Boyden's general store, which stood for more than 50 years, gave this intersection the name Boyden Square. (Note: It was later named Hartnett Square for William Harnett, who died in World War I, and then commonly known as East Dedham Square.)

==== The East Dedham Strike ====
The labor movement in the United States was beginning to have some successes in the 1870s. The Great and General Court of Massachusetts passed a law in May 1874 that limited the hours women and children could be employed in a mill to 10 a day. However, because there was no way to enforce the law, it was largely ignored.

At the Merchant's Woolen Mills, which owned all the mills on Mother Brook at this time, employees were required to work 65.5 hours a week. This included 12.5 hours Monday to Friday, and a "half day" on Saturdays when they would be at their stations for 10 hours. They were not paid for the two 30 minute meal breaks twice a day.

In September 1874, employees' wages were reduced by 10%. Hours were then cut back to 10 hours a day in October to meet the requirements of the new law. A slowdown in orders led to about 400 of the 700 employees being laid off, and hours brought back to 65.5 a week for those who remained in violation of the law.

On March 2, 1875, workers gathered in Mechanics Hall to discuss their response. The meeting, which included more than a third of those still left employed, was president over by German immigrant and mill hand Andrew Reichell. They voted to draft a letter in which they said they would not work more than 10 hours a day, or 60 hours a week. If the management would not agree to these terms, they said they would strike for at least a month. They also "unanimously voted that no violence be offered to any persons who take their places at the mill."

Royal O. Storrs responded that women would be permitted to leave the mills after they worked 60 hour in a week, but that he could not promise that they would still have a job when they returned. Men were required to sign contracts in which they agreed to work the full 65.5 hours. The workers, who demanded all be given 60 hour weeks, walked out of the mills on March 3 and the mills shut down.

The next day, employees met again and said that they were not so concerned with their low pay as they were with the number of hours worked. They said they wanted "time to educate ourselves and our children, and value that more highly than the pittance we should receive." They also had particular grievances against Storrs, who they worried would "oppress us still further" if they gave in.

A committee of striking employees met with Charles L. Harding, one of the owners. He promised not to fire any women who left after 60 hours but said the mill could not operate profitably if the men didn't work 65.5 hours. As the strike dragged on, the sympathy of the town was with the striking employees.

A mass meeting was called at Memorial Hall and over 1,000 people attended. At the meeting, E.M. Chamberlain of the National Labor Reform Commission spoke and argued for a law mandating a 10-hour work day for men and an 8-hour day for women and children. He also called for mill owners who did not comply to be prosecuted. John Orvis called for the striking workers in Dedham to join forces with striking workers in Fall River. (Note: Orvis was a founding member of Brook Farm and a champion of the Knights of Labor.) Charles McLean also spoke. McLean, Orvis, and Chamberlain all escorted the president of the striking workers, Patrick Hogan, to the podium.

Newspapers, some of which were as far away as New York City and Philadelphia, were mixed in how they covered the strike with some sympathetic towards the workers and others towards the management. The Dedham Transcript supported the strikers and wrote about "the dignity of labor."

By March 17, most of the workers, who had little money to support them, were back to work in the mills. They were unsuccessful in getting a 60-hour work week. Instead, they began organized for a state law that would mandate a 10-hour day for all factory workers; such a law was passed in 1880.

=== Food ===
A grocery store stood in the middle part of the century at the corner of School and Washington Streets. It was owned by Austin Bryant, the Town's treasurer and tax collector. (Note: Bryant was also an officer of the First Church and Parish in Dedham.) Bryant sold the store to Horatio Clarke in 1845, and in 1847 it was sold again William H. Mason. Mason owned it until his death, at which point it was taken over by Merrill D. Ellis. (Note: Ellis was the brother of Calvin F. Ellis and lived in Clapboardtree parish and played the violin in the West Dedham Unitarian choir.) Another grocery store opened on the first floor of the S.C. & E. Manufactory on High Street.

In East Dedham, at 23 Milton Street, there was a grocery story owned by George Hewitt. (Note: Hewitt was an English immigrant from Wiltshire who arrived in Dedham in 1854. Hewitt was a weaver in England and then became an overseer at the Merchants' Woolen Mill. With Edward Rose, who was related to him by marriage, he owned a duplex at 24–26 Chauncey Street that he rented out to mill workers. He died in March 1902 and, a few months later, Benjamin Rose took over the business. Both Benjamin Rose and Hewitt were members of the Royal Arcanum.) The building was shared with the East Dedham branch of the Dedham Public Library and the Royal Arcanum hall.

Nathaniel Hewins was the Town's baker, and he employed a Mr. Sawin, Bestwick's neighbor. Hewins bakery, which adjoined his residence, faced Franklin Square. (Note: Hewins had two sons, Fisher and Alfred.)

On Court Street, near the intersection with Church Street, was a fish market and restaurant. The owner, Warren "Oyster" Fisher, lived next door in a house where a number of people boarded. (Note: Fisher had lost an eye.) A few doors down was a bakery. There was a slaughterhouse on Eastern Ave near the railroad station.

=== Industry ===
Since the founding of Dedham in 1636, farming had been the dominant way of life for residents. Land and other resources were plentiful but, by the early 19th century, they were beginning to become scarce. It was said that by 1814 that "some of the most respectable and enterprising young men of Dedham" were working in the mills, which marked a shift in the life of the community. Large grants of land were no longer available to give to younger sons to start their own farms.

With the arrival of railroads in 1831, Dedham became an attractive location for manufacturing. By 1837, the mills and factories in town were producing cotton and woolen goods, leather, boots, shoes, paper, marbled paper, iron castings, chairs, cabinet wares, straw bonnets, palm-leaf hats, and silk goods. Together they were worth $510,755 with the silk goods alone worth $10,000.

A silk factory opened on Eastern Ave in 1836 but burned down on March 11, 1845. In later years it became a dye house, a laundry, and a playing card factory. (Note: The factory was run by the father of Henry W. Fiske.) By 1880, the site had become home to the C.D. Brooks Chocolate Factory. On March 28, 1845, the Ashcroft Calico Works burned down.

There were more than 500 people employed in local industries in 1845. That year there were two cotton mills, a silk factory, a furnace foundry, a shovel works, three woolen mills, a paper factory, two tanneries, eight woodworking factories, a cotton thread factory, two iron and tin works, four coach manufacturers, and a number of smaller businesses producing boots, shoes, saddles, harnesses, cigars, marbled paper, pocket books, and headwear. The marbled paper manufactory, S.C. & E. Mann, was located on the south side of High Street between Court and Pearl Streets. (Note: Samuel Mann manufactured "fancy paper and cards." He lived on Court Street and later moved to Green Lodge.)

Major Jacob Clark (Note: Clark was born in 1774 and died in 1837.) was a building contractor who later became a millwright, setting up water-wheels at mills around New England and the maritime provinces before the advent of the steam engine. Clark lived on Federal Hill and his factory was powered by horses who walked in a circle and powered a large gear overhead. Most of the waterwheels in use at the time, including those on Mother Brook, were overshot wheels. Clark also built the Allin Congregational Church.

After Clark's death in 1837, his partner, Edward B. Holmes, continued the wheelwright business. (Note: Holmes was an officer at the First Church and Parish in Dedham. After the death of his wife he boarded with Abiathar Richards and then moved to Connecticut, where he died in 1861.) In 1846, Thomas Dunbar, who had been their apprentice, became Holmes' partner. (Note: Dunbar, who was born in Canton, later moved to St. Catherine's, Canada in 1852 where he began working in canal and harbor dredging. He had a son, Charles, and eventually settled in Buffalo, N.Y.) They moved the shop from Federal Hill to an old paper mill on High Street near East Street. The building was across the street from the train tracks in a building connected to a blacksmith shop.

With the Industrial Revolution, Dedham experienced the ups and downs of a national economy.

In the early part of the century, there were only two holidays a year at the mills on Mother Brook: the Fourth of July and Thanksgiving, plus militia training days. When Catholics began arriving, they refused to work on Christmas. At first Protestants performed the dirty tasks that the Catholic employees typically did, but around 1860 it became a holiday for all.

=== Lumber and carpentry ===
Frederick L. Bestwick, the harness maker, lived on School Street just east of the Centre School with his nephew, Albert. After Joel Richard's died, Aaron Marden and Henry Curtis opened up a planing mill and sawing business in this first floor of the Richards' shop. (Note: Marden lived on Church Street.)

Sumner Wilson had a carpenter shop on Wilson's Lane where the saws and lathes were run by horsepower. (Note: Wilson Lane is modern day Worthington Street.) He later built a two family rental house next door. A carriage manufacturing and painting shop owned by Elisha McIntosh was located on Court Street and a blacksmith was located in the rear. (Note: McIntosh also owned rental housing behind the Centre School.)

In the basement of Jacob Clark's shop was a stationary engine of a peculiar design. In the lower story were circular saws, lathes, and planers. On the floor that was level with the train tracks was iron work machinery. The pair then moved to an unused building near the old stone depot on Mother Brook where they used steam power.

There were still saw pits in Dedham as late as 1827, though there was a sawmill in Tiot in 1644 and one on Mother Brook in 1699.

=== Medical ===
In 1819, George Dixon bought the land at 601-603 High Street and built a home there. In the ell of the house was an apothecary shop that sold products produced by Dedham's Wheaton & Dixon. After Dixon's death, an apothecary named Tower took over the shop. When Tower was named postmaster, George Marsh, who had attended the Dedham Public Schools, then became the village apothecary. Marsh had learned the trade at a chemist's stop on Cambridge Street in Boston.

Jesse Wheaton, a doctor in the town, opened an apothecary shop on High Street. (Note: Wheaton once treated a patient for a cold and a sore throat by giving him a shot of julep and calomel. The patient was unaware of the calomel in the treatment, however, and its laxative effects kept the patient suffering for the next two days. A court awarded the patient $40, but it was overturned on appeal. Wheaton's office held the plans for the buildings of the Norfolk Cotton Manufactory. Builders who were interested in constructing them would visit his office to view them and then bid on the job.) In the shop he employed his nephew, Jesse Talbot. Wheaton lived on the south side of Court Street and was one of the oldest residents in Dedham. (Note: Wheton was also an active member of the Allin Congregational Church.) He also hired Lemuel Thwing to sell his patent medicines, including Wheaton's Itch Ointment, Lee's Bilious Pills, Dumfrey's Eye Water, Godfrey's Cordial, and Godfrey's Bone Liniment, around New England and Canada in a large wagon with "Itch Ointment and Others" emblazoned on the side.

Jeremy Stimson was a family physician and president of the Dedham Bank who lived on High Street. (Note: He lived next door to Rev. William Montague) Doctor Samuel Stillman Whitney lived in Franklin Square and later sold his house to Dr. J.P. Maynard. Maynard also lived in a house just to the west of what is today 601-603 High Street. Maynard invented a forerunner to the Band-Aid. (Note: Maynard had a daughter. His son-in-law, Fred Russell, lived in Indianapolis in 1876.)

=== Other businesses ===
On Ames Street in the mid-19th century near High Street was a long building that housed a number of lawyers, with their signs adorning the exterior. Two houses down from the Centre School lived Jeremiah Radford, who cared for both the Norfolk County Courthouse and St. Paul's Church. (Note: Radford's wife was a "neighborly woman" who only had one eye.) Daniel Marsh was a mason. (Note: Marsh's children include Daniel, George, William, Libbie, Jane, Abby, Eliza, and Fanny. The family lived on School Street. He sold his land on Wilson's Lane (modern day Worthington Street) to Horatio Clarke.)

The town's 1889 directory lists 10 blacksmiths, six boarding houses, five hotels, two ice dealers, 17 grocers, seven physicians and surgeons, four lawyers, 17 dressmakers, and one dentist. The products produced in town that year included boots, cabinets, chocolate, carriages, cigars, dresses, harnesses, slippers, suspenders, soap, tools, watches, and whips.

After the Columbian Minerva, the Norfolk Repository began covering the news of Dedham. Both were published by Herman Mann. It was followed by the Dedham Gazette, published by Jabez Chickering with Theron Metcalf as editor. There were two weekly newspapers, the Dedham Standard and the Dedham Transcript. The Norfolk Democrat was published by Elbridge G. Robinson. (Note: Robinson lived on the corner of Washington Street and High Street. It was already an old house in the mid-1800s with a long sloping roof. He lived next door to Charles J. Capen.)

George Guild, who was also chief of the Dedham Fire Department, owned a jewelry shop in Dedham Square, first on High Street and then on Washington Street.

In the 1800s many Dedham men, constrained by the growing population and the scarcity of land, left Dedham for the Ohio Country. They could thank, in part, Manasseh Cutler, a former Dedham resident and the son-in-law of South Dedham's Minister, Thomas Balch, who convinced Congress to approve a plantation there. Some of those people would die in Indian raids there.

The town pump was located at the head of Franklin Square. It was made of wood painted green with an iron handle. Two lots over was an octagonal building with a large circular reservoir inside fed by the Federal Hill spring. The cistern was filled with hay in the winter to keep it from freezing and then emptied each spring. It was later taken down and rebuilt as a residence near Stone Haven station.

In the mid-1800s, a small traveling circus would come to town once a year. It was popular with those who worked in the mills on Mother Brook, "surpassing in its manifold attractions even Independence day," but the mill owners and town officials worried that it took too much money out of the town.

=== Railroads ===
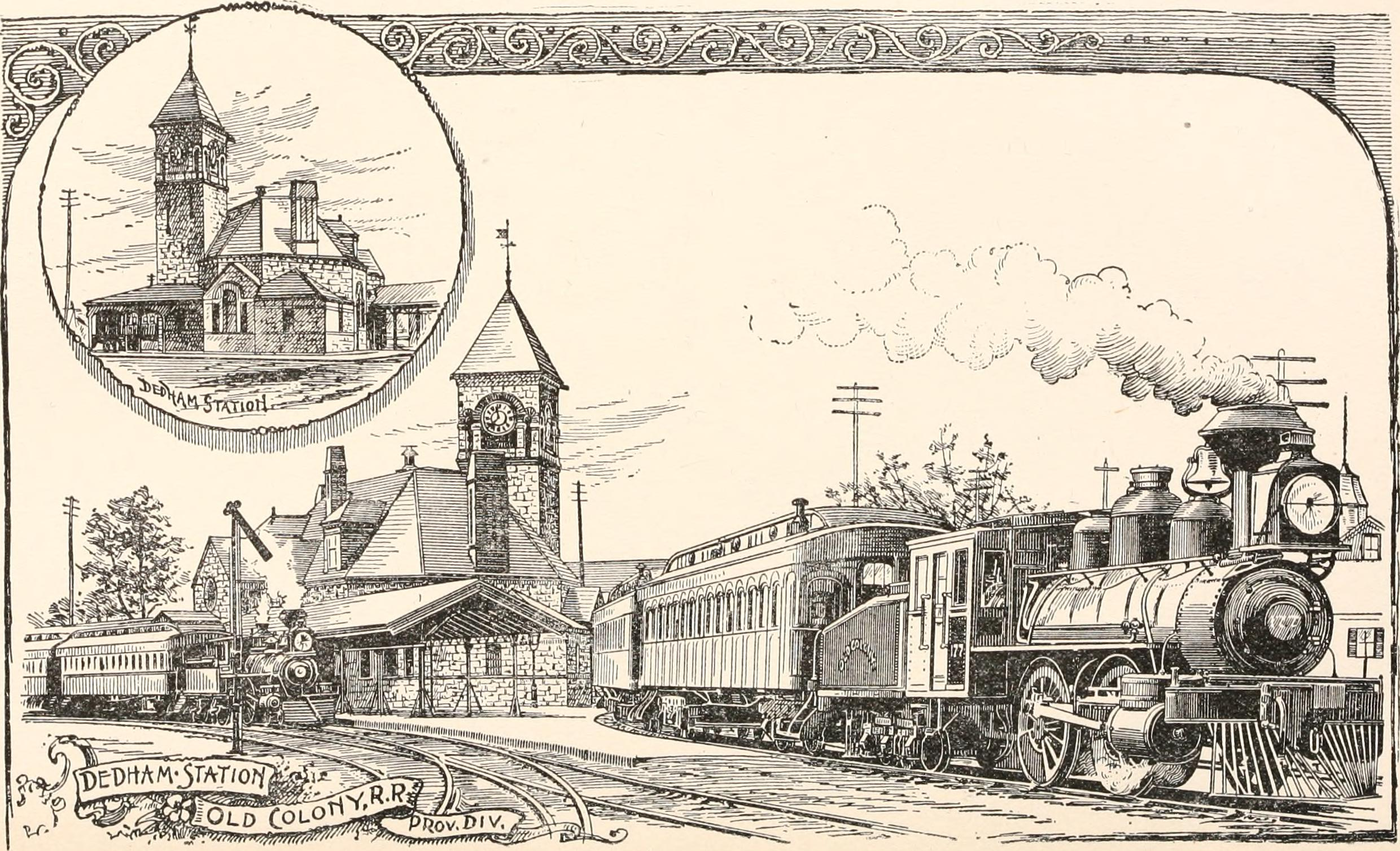
The Dedham Train Station was located in Dedham Square where the parking lot now is.

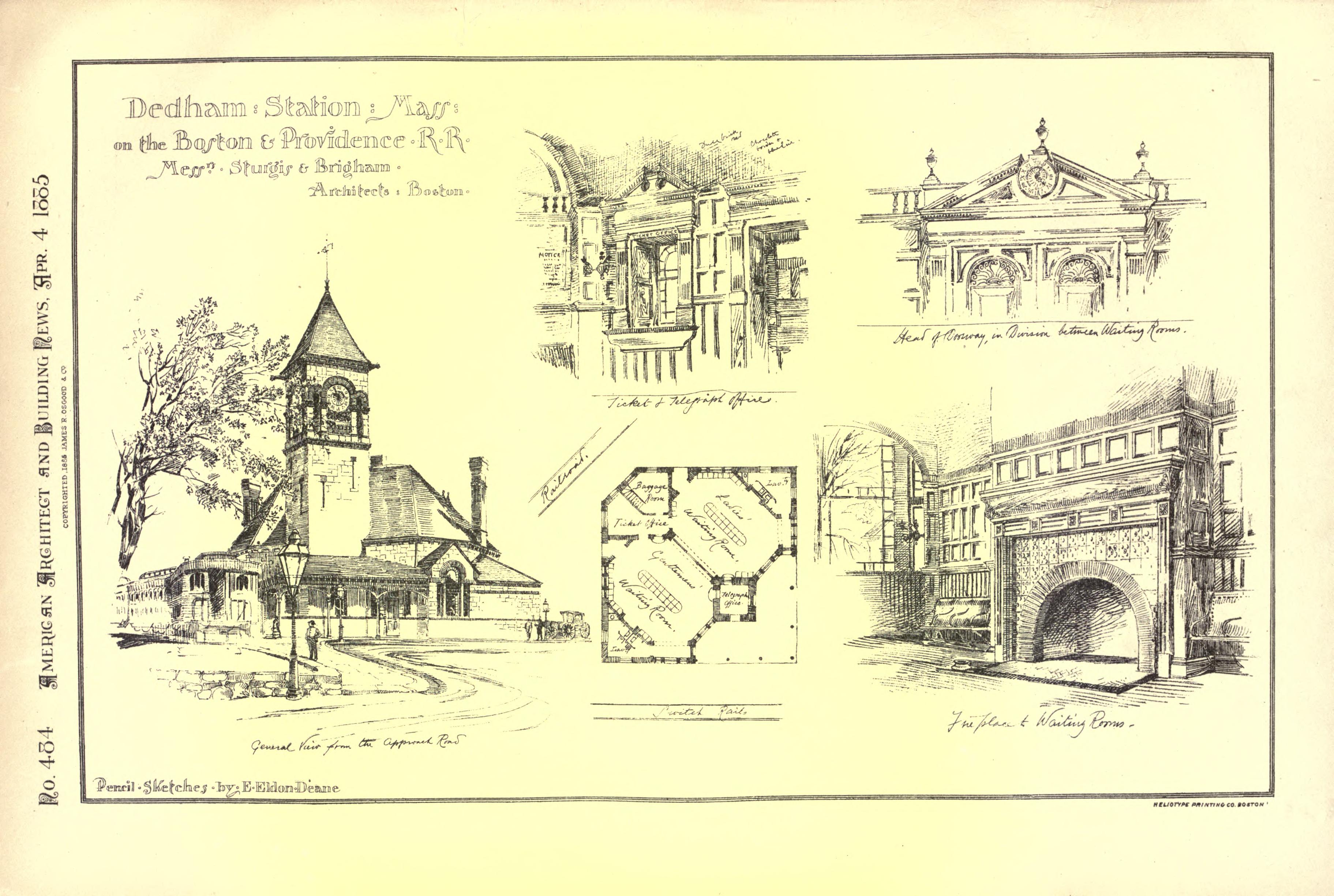
Sketches of the station

Within a few decades of the turnpikes' arrival, railroad beds were laid through Dedham. The railroad was initially "considered dangerous. It was new fangled. People didn't trust it, so they wouldn't ride it. Only a very few brave souls in those opening years" ever boarded one. This fear was short lived, however as the first rail line came in 1836 and by 1842 locomotives had put the stagecoach lines out of business. The first line was a branch connecting Dedham Square to the main Boston-Providence line in Readville. In 1848 the Norfolk County Railroad connected Dedham and Walpole and in 1854 the Boston and New York Central ran through town.

The train bridge over Wigwam Creek, near the intersection of East and High Streets, had a red roof. Mrs. Hutchins' boarding house was next door. (Note: Hutchins had a son, George, who attended the Centre School.) In 1886, the railroad built a new bridge over High Street and placed a granite plaque there to commemorate both the new bridge and the 250th anniversary of the town's incorporation. The plaque was removed sometime thereafter and ended up in the woods near railroad tracks in Sharon. It has since been returned to Dedham.

In 1881 the Boston and Providence Railroad company built a station in Dedham Square out of Dedham Granite. There were more than 60 trains a day running to it in its heyday, but it was demolished in 1951 and the stones were used to build an addition to the main branch of the Dedham Public Library.

Moses Boyd was the "well-known and gentlemanly" conductor of the Dedham branch of the Providence Railroad. At a party for his 25th wedding anniversary his passengers presented him with gifts of cash that totaled between $600 and $700. In addition to the passengers from Dedham, West Roxbury and Jamaica Plain, the President and Superintendent of the railroad attended the party at his home and presented him with a silver plate.

=== Retail shops ===
Enoch Sutton, the watchmaker, owned the house just south of Bryant's grocery store on Washington Street. Andrew Wiggin's shoe store was on the corner of High Street and Washington Street. At the same corner was a tailor and Mason Richard's dry goods store. (Note: Richards lived above the store.)

A Mr. Eaton was the lumber dealer. (Note: Eaton had a son, Joel.) A millinery store was located under Temperance Hall. Erastus Shumway owned a stove and tinshop on School Street. He later moved the shop to Court Street on the first floor of the Independent Order of Odd Fellows building. (Note: The Odd Fellows Lodge did not exist for very long before folding.) Next door lived Ambrose Galucia, a house painter. The home of Joseph Guild, the hardware dealer, was in Franklin Square.

On Church Street, near the intersection with Norfolk Street, was William Field's dry good store. Above the store was the original location of Dedham High School. Just north of the school was Mr. Packard's stove store. (Note: Packard was the sexton at the Allin Congregational Church.) Next door was a hat making shop owned by Timothy Phelps. In the back, Phelps had a bathing establishment that offered both hot and cold baths.

Just north on Church Street was a barber shop owned by Amory "Barber" Fisher who later owned and an ice and coal business. Further up the street was the home and paint shop of John Cox. (Note: Cox was the father of John Cox Jr., and Samuel H. Cox, the publisher and editor, respectively, of the Dedham Transcript, as well as William H. "Willie" Cox, an invalid. Cox was born near the railroad station.) Next to the Cox home was Nancy Damon's store that sold "thread, ribbons, silks, and fancy goods." (Note: Damon had a speech impediment. Her later years "were clouded" and she died "in a state of despondency.") It was previously located across the street from the Norfolk House.

At the corner of Washington and High Streets, where the police station sits in 2021, was a number of buildings owned by Charles Coolidge. Those buildings "were rented by a class of people, especially in the rear, that made the whole locality an eyesore in the heart of the village." At the corner was Coolidge's book and newspaper store, a tailor by the name of Lynch, and another store that sold secretly sold liquor. Memorial Hall was later built on the site.

In East Dedham, Adam Geishecker opened a dry goods store in 1896, 15 years after he had immigrated from Germany. (Note: The store later moved to Dedham Square.)

=== Roads ===
Turnpikes, including the South Road, linking Boston and Providence, and the Middle Road, linking Dedham and Hartford, were laid through town during the first few years of the 19th century. In 1810, the stage left Boston at 4 a.m. and passed through Dedham as it traveled 100 miles to Hartford. It arrived at 8 p.m., stopping only to change horses.

In 1802, Fisher Ames and a group of others requested that the Great and General Court lay out a new turnpike between the Norfolk County Courthouse and Pawtucket. Dedham's representative, Ebenezer Fisher, voted no, but the Norfolk and Bristol Turnpike was chartered on March 8, 1802. Nathaniel Ames was incensed and believed Fisher's no vote made him a "traitor" motivated by "an ancient prejudice against the Old Parish." At the following May's election, the issue of turnpikes was a greater driver of participation than political party. Those from the outlying parts of town attended in large numbers to support Representative Fisher and his opposition to the turnpike.

The Norfolk and Bristol Turnpike created modern day Washington Street from High Street in Dedham Square to the Roxbury line. (Note: The creation of the road necessitated moving and reorienting the Colburn family home. It originally sat across what is today the road, and was moved to a position on the new corner where the Knights of Columbus building is today on the northwest corner of the Washington Street-High Street intersection.) It then turned west to Court Street, where it ran south to Washington Street, and then straight to Pawtucket.

High Street, which connected the village to the mills on Mother Brook, was constructed in 1806.

Edward L. Penniman laid out Mt. Auburn Street (modern day Whiting Avenue) and Mt. Vernon Street through his own property. (Note: Penniman was born in Boston in 1799 and first moved to Dedham Island, which he improved and named Riverdale. He sold the land to John Lothrop Motley's family. He later moved to the intersection of East Street and Whiting Avenue and then Pearl Avenue. He was a director in the Dedham Bank, Dedham Savings, or both. He would move to New York and lived there until his death in July 1871.) The Town named the intersection of those two streets Penniman Square, but Penniman died the same day and never learned of the honor.

Jeremiah Shuttleworth leased a lot of land from St. Paul's Church at the corner of Church and High Streets. The minister, William Montague, referred to the intersection as "Jere Square" in his honor.

Modern day Worthington Street was known in the 19th century as Wilson's Lane. Dwight's bridge over Wigwam Creek stood at the intersection of High and East Streets. Lyons Street is named for a 19th-century landowner, Elisha Lyon. Lyon lived on the Needham side of the Charles River. There has been a bridge on the site since the 1740s, but the current bridge was built in 1879. Lyons Street originally ran as far as Common Street but was cut short and dead ended when Route 128 was built.

== Taverns ==
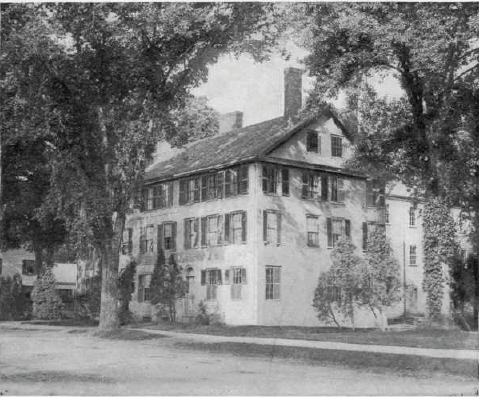
The Norfolk House was built in 1802 and once hosted a speech by Abraham Lincoln.

Inns and taverns sprung up along the new roads as more than 600 coaches would pass through Dedham each day on their way to Boston or Providence. The stable behind Gay's Tavern could hold over 100 horses and eight horse teams could be switched within two minutes. Gay's Tavern was out of business by 1810. The Ames Tavern closed after the death of its last operator, Deborah Woodward, and was demolished in 1817.

=== Norfolk House ===
In 1802, a local mason named Martin Marsh built his brick home at what is today 19 Court Street and was then right on one of the new turnpikes. Marsh rented the land from the First Church and Parish in Dedham. He saw the traffic flowing daily past his house and quickly turned his home into a tavern, opening by August 12, 1805 His establishment, the Norfolk House, like the other inns and taverns in Dedham at that time, were bustling with the arrival of both the turnpikes and the courts. He maintained the tavern until 1818, and then sold it to Moses Gray and Francis Alden.On the north side of Court Street was a building called the "Flat Iron Building" due to its wedge-like shape. It was this partnership that hosted President Andrew Jackson for lunch as he and his entourage passed through town in 1832.

The Norfolk House was also a hotbed for Republican politics in its day. A young Congressman named Abraham Lincoln gave a speech at the Norfolk House on September 20, 1848, while in Massachusetts to campaign for Zachary Taylor. He appeared uncomfortable as he arrived but

His indifferent manner vanished as soon as he opened his mouth. He went right to work. He turned up the cuffs of his shirt. Next, he loosened his necktie, and soon after it he took it off altogether. All the time, he was gaining upon his audience. He soon had it as by a spell. I never saw men more delighted. He began to bubble out with humor. For plain pungency of humor, it would have been difficult to surpass his speech. The speech ended in a half-hour. The bell that called to the steam cars sounded. Mr. Lincoln instantly stopped. ‘I am engaged to speak at Cambridge tonight, and I must leave.’ The whole audience seemed to rise in protest. ‘Go on! Finish it!’ was heard on every hand. One gentleman arose and pledged to take his horse and carry him across country. But Mr. Lincoln was inexorable.

=== Phoenix Hotel ===
The Phoenix Hotel was one of the most popular social spots in Dedham during the 19th century. It was located on the northwest corner of the High Street-Washington Street intersection in modern-day Dedham Square. Among the distinguished guests of this hotel were Andrew Jackson and James Monroe.

When the Norfolk and Bristol Turnpike was opened in 1803, Timothy Gay leased a tavern directly on the new road. Gay was also the owner of the Citizen Stagecoach Line and, due to this, all of the stagecoaches traveling between Providence and Boston stopped at his tavern. (Note: All of the coaches for the Citizen Stagecoach Line were built in Dedham as well.) Gay was out of business by 1810, but was then operated by a number of others who gave the business their name, including Calp, Smith, Polley, Alden, and Bride. John Bride was proprietor by 1832 and it was an attractive hotel that could handle the relay of horses and the needs of the many passengers who passed through each day. The 12 to 15 coaches that pulled up each day typically had seven or more people in each. The stable housed over 100 horses at any given time. Teams of eight horses could be swapped out in two minutes.

==== Fires ====
Around two o'clock in the morning on October 30, 1832, a fire broke out in the stable and quickly traveled to the hotel, leveling both in 90 minutes. The fire killed 66 horses and one man, who was sleeping in the barn. It was assumed that the man, a veteran of the Revolution walking to Washington, D.C. to beg for a pension, was the cause of the fire. The veteran was buried at the local cemetery, and it took several days to cart all of the dead horses down to the marshes where their carcasses could be sunk into the mud.

Bride rebuilt the inn, naming it the Phoenix Hotel in honor of it rising from the ashes. It had four large parlors on the first floor in addition to a dining hall that measured 58' by 28' and a bar that was 38' by 18'. The second floor had six parlors and ten chambers, with a total of sixty guest rooms. The Norfolk Advertiser called it "a splendid new house, not surpassed in size, fixtures, or elegance of finish, by any in all the villages of Massachusetts." The stable was built adjacent to the hotel again, but this time a brick wall served as a firestop between the two.

Another fire broke out in the stables around 2:00 a.m. on January 7, 1834, just 15 months later. After the second fire, the stables were rebuilt further down Washington Street and away from the hotel. A third fire broke out on January 7, 1850. The hotel and other buildings in the area were emptied as a precaution, but the engine companies were able to keep the flames confined to the stable.

John Wade, a resident at the competing Norfolk House, got drunk one evening and mentioned that he knew something about the first fire. He was arrested within an hour and would confess that he had been hired by the owner of the Norfolk House to light the first fire.

Wade was found guilty of both arson and murder and sentenced to death, but Rev. Ebenzer Burgess intervened on his behalf and helped get it communed to life imprisonment. The accused owner of the Norfolk House, which was a stop on the competing Tremont Stagecoach Line, committed suicide shortly after Wade named him. George Walton was later identified as the culprit in the second fire and was indicted, but he died of consumption in prison before he could be tried.

==== Rules of baseball ====
On May 13, 1858, members of the various town ball teams in the Boston area met at the Phoenix Hotel to form the Massachusetts Association of Baseball Players. The nine team association included three teams from Boston and one from Dedham. (Note: One of the original ten teams to arrive that morning preferred the Knickerbocker Rules and so left the meeting.)

The association developed a set of rules that came to be known as the Massachusetts Game. There were no foul balls, four bases in a rectangular shape, and games lasted until one team had scored 100 runs. At the end of the day, after they adopted 17 rules, they broke to play a game that was well attended by residents.

==== Later years ====
Under different names and different managers, the house continued to do a good business. John Howe and his wife owned the hotel from 1850 to 1879, during which time it became one of the community's leading social spots. During the Civil War, it was commonly frequented by officers from nearby Camp Meigs. After that it gained a reputation as a spa, where people from the city might escape for a few days.

Its last owner, Henry White, had owned it for only a year when it finally burned to the ground on the morning of December 25, 1880. (Note: White was also the jailkeeper at the nearby Norfolk County Jail.) It was the last tavern in Dedham at the time and, when it finally burned, Dedham's days of hosting stagecoach travelers ended.

=== Temperance Hall ===
The Temperance Hall Association, which was part of the temperance movement that opposed alcohol, purchased the old Norfolk County Courthouse in 1845. They extended the second floor by building an addition propped up by stilts that extended into the back yard. The Boy's Dedham Picnic Band often played before temperance rallies and other events.

The hall was rented out to a great number of organizations. Among the groups using the hall were ventriloquists, magicians, a painted panorama entitled "The Burning of Moscow," a glassblowing exhibition, a demonstration of a model volcano called "The Eruption of Vesuvius," plays, concerts, including one by the Mendelssohn String Quartet, lectures, fundraisers, debates, bell ringers, and marching sessions by a para-military drill club. Among the speakers who took the podium there were Theodore Parker, Oliver Wendell Holmes Sr., Frederick Douglass, Horace Mann, Father Matthew, Abraham Lincoln, William R. Alger, and John Boyle O'Reilly.

By 1846, the Catholic community in Dedham was well established enough that the town became part of the mission of St. Joseph's Church in Roxbury. The flood of Irish immigrants escaping the Great Famine necessitated celebrating Mass in Temperance Hall, often by Father Patrick O'Beirne.

The building burned down on April 28, 1891.

==== Fenian raid ====
Following the Civil War, the local chapter of the Fenian Brotherhood, which had offices in the nearby Norfolk House, hosted a meeting in which a Fenian raid into Canada was organized. John R. Bullard, a recent Harvard Law School graduate, was elected moderator of the meeting and, having been swept up in his own sudden importance and fever of the meeting, ended his animated speech by asking "Who would be the first man to come forward and pledge himself to go to Canada and help free Ireland?" The first of the roughly dozen men to sign the "enlistment papers" were Patrick Donohoe and Thomas Golden. Thomas Brennan said he could not participate, but donated $50 to the cause. The meeting ended with the group singing "The Wearing of the Green."

The raid was a failure. Some of the men got as far as St. Albans, Vermont, but none made it to Canada. A few were arrested and some had to send home for money. Around the same time, Patrick Ford, the treasurer of the Brotherhood, absconded to South America with the organization's money.

=== Howe Tavern ===
William Howe opened the Howe Tavern on Court Street at the intersection of Church Street, at the site of the original St. Paul's Church. He sold it in 1818 to Mace Smith who renamed it the Punch Bowl Tavern. Smith sold it in 1833 and from then on it was used as either a tavern or a boardinghouse, being known as the Columbian House in the 1840s. It was nearly destroyed in a fire in 1891, at which point it was rebuilt for use as a private residence.

== Bicentennial ==
=== Planning ===
At a town meeting held on November 9, 1835, a committee of 21 citizens was appointed to make arrangements for the celebration of the bicentennial anniversary of the incorporation and settlement of the town. On March 7, 1836, they reported that they engaged Samuel Foster Haven to compose and deliver an address on that occasion at the First Parish meetinghouse on September 21, 1836, at 11 a.m. All the clergy and choirs of the town were invited and asked to participate, and the Dedham Light Infantry Company was requested escort the procession. A dinner was to follow for the clergy and paid guests. On April 11, 1836, William Ellis, Enos Foord, Ira Cleveland, William King Gay, and Jabez Coney Jr. were chosen as a committee to execute on the plan.

=== Procession ===
For nearly a year prior to the Town's bicentennial in 1836, a committee worked to make plans for a celebration. At dawn, church bells throughout the town began ringing and a 100 gun cannonade was launched. At 10:30 a.m., a procession left the new town house and processed through the streets of town. Nathaniel Guild, the grand marshal, was aided by 25 assistant marshals, (Note: The assistant marshals were John Morse, Ira Russell, Nathan Phillips, Luther Eaton, Merrill Ellis, Josiah Dean, 2d, Theodore Gay, 2d, Samuel C. Mann, Benjamin Boyden, Reuben Guild, 2d, Edward B. Holmes, Joseph Day, Ezra W. Taft, Edward D. Weld, Elbridge G. Robinson, James Downing, Austin Bryant, Theodore Metcalf, Francis Guild, Nathaniel A. Hewins. Reuben G. Trescott, Stephen Barry, Joseph Fisher, Joseph A. Wilder, and John D. Colburn.) Dedham's Light Infantry, and a military band. The "industrious classes" of the town divided the procession up by occupation. The mechanics, tradesmen, and manufacturers all had their own sections, but the farmers were excluded.

The agricultural workers of the town tried to participate but, having been denied the place of honor they thought they deserved, largely avoided the event. The organizers dismissed the farmers' complaints as the sour grapes of "a proud lump of aristocracy." They said that if any group was to be given the place of honor, it should be these "to whom we are indebted for the present prosperity of the town," and not those who were "far behind the age in many respects." It was the industrious classes, they believed, who had transformed Dedham from an agricultural community into a "thriving, businesslike and growing community." As a result, it was on their shoulders that "all of our hopes for the future rest."

At the Norfolk House, the procession was joined by Governor Edward Everett and a number of clergy and then proceeded to the First Parish green. There they passed through lines of the eight fire companies with their engines and apparatus, and 500 schoolchildren, and under an arch of evergreen boughs and flowers with "Incorporated 1636" on one side and "1836" on the other.

=== Service ===
The services were commenced by singing the anthem "Wake the Song of Jubilee." A prayer was then offered by the Rev. Alvan Lamson of the First Parish. The following hymn, composed especially for the occasion by the Rev. John Pierpont of Boston, was read by the Rev. Calvin Durfee of the South Parish and sung to the tune of Old Hundred.

Not now, O God, beneath the trees
That shade this plain at night's cold noon
Do Indian war songs load the breeze
Or wolves sit howling to the moon
The foes the fears our fathers felt
Have with our fathers passed away
And where in their dark hours they knelt
We come to praise thee and to pray
We praise thee that thou plantedst them
And mad st thy heavens drop down their dew
We pray that shooting from their stem
We long may flourish where they grew
And Father leave us not alone
Thou hast been and art still our trust
Be thou our fortress till our own
Shall mingle with our father's dust

Haven then gave an address on the history of the town. Another anthem was then sung and the services were closed with a Benediction by the Rev. Samuel B. Babcock of the Episcopal Church.

=== Dinner ===
After a prayer service, 600 people then processed to a pavilion erected to host a dinner on the land of John Bullard a few rods to the west. James Richardson presided at this dinner, assisted by John Endicott, George Bird, Abner Ellis, Theron Metcalf, and Thomas Barrows as Vice Presidents.

A blessing was asked by the Rev. John White of the West Parish and thanks returned by the Rev. Dr. Jonathan Homer of Newton. After the cloth was removed, Richardson gave a number of toasts, interspersed with music from the band:

1. The Day, with all its hallowed associations and congenial joys. May we prove true and faithful to our ancestors to our institutions and to posterity.

2. The memory of the first settlers of this town, their resolution, fortitude, perseverance, and devotion to civil and religious liberty. May we never in our zeal to outstrip them in accomplishments leave their virtues in the rear.

3. The Governor of the Commonwealth. The stock was the growth of our own soil; a branch is refreshing the State by its shadow, and its fruit has been healthful to the nation.

4. The University at Cambridge - the offspring of the labors and privations of the Puritan Fathers: while we venerate the parents, let us cherish the child and may it always be guided by as unerring a hand as now holds the reins.

5. Practical Education: That teaches what to do and when to do it and never to rest satisfied till it is done and well done.

6. The objects of the deep solicitude of our ancestry - the church and the school house. May the progress of religious, moral, and intellectual culture within transcend that of material beauty without.

7. The memory of the Rev. Samuel Dexter and Doctor Nathaniel Ames, Senior: Townsmen distinguished for piety and learning, science, and philosophy, and whose descendants have been and are among the gifted and illustrious men of our nation.

8. The principles and spirit that brought the pilgrims to these shores - cherished and venerated by succeeding ages, embodied in our constitution and laws, dispensing blessings over our whole country in peace or war, in weal or woe, may we never abandon those principles nor prove recreant to that spirit.

9. The memory of Governor Winthrop: His presence awed the savages during his life. He is indebted to a Savage for the best edition of his memorable Journal.

10. The Militia - the only safe defense of Republics. When legislators doubt, let them consult the spirits of Warren, Prescott and the Heroes of Bunker Hill.

After the toast to him, the governor spoke of Richard Everett, his ancestor and one of the early settlers of Dedham, and the multiple generations of his family who played a part in the history of the town. He also noted the "wonderful progress and development" in the commonwealth and the nation over the preceding four decades. He added that the advancement had been truer nowhere than in Dedham.

On announcing sentiments alluding to the guests or their ancestors, several besides the governor addressed the company, including John Davis, Judge of the District Court of the United States for the District of Massachusetts, Josiah Quincy III, President of Harvard College, Henry Alexander Scammell Dearborn, Adjutant General of the Commonwealth, William Jackson, Representative in Congress, Franklin Dexter, Alexander Hill Everett, and Robert C. Winthrop, Aid to Governor Everett. A great number of sentiments were also given by invited guests and by the citizens of the town.

=== Women's events ===
The women of the town spread a table the whole length of the lower floor of the Court House and furnished it with an ample collation. The court room was used as a drawing room and the library room was decorated with native and exotic fruits. A piano forte was placed in the court room and music formed part of the entertainment. The following hymn, prepared for the occasion by a lady, was sung by the ladies accompanying the piano:

Welcome, all dear friends, returning,
Though from different paths you come;
Welcome all whose hearts are yearning,
For their dear-loved native home.

Some in foreign lands have wandered,
Some from the far west have come;
Yet where er the footsteps lingered,
Thought still turned to home sweet home.

Many a well known face shall meet ye,
Many a joyous smile shall bless;
Many a kindred heart shall greet ye,
While old friends around you press.

Come then hasten with us gather,
Round our simple festive board;
Come and with us bless that Father,
Who on all his love hath poured.

Condescend to grant Thy blessing,
Thou who dost our lives defend;
While Thy children Thee addressing,
Own Thee as their common Friend.

At the invitation of the ladies to who on the display, Governor Everett attended the ladies' event after the dinner. After sampling the fruit, the women sang the hymn again for him. He then returned to the court room and, from the bench, made a short address to the ladies in which he remarked on the privations, sufferings, fortitude, and piety of the first mothers and daughters of the town.

== Scenic community ==
Dedham Village was described at the time as "very pleasant, and possesses every inducement to render it a desirable residence for the mechanic or man of leisure." The "scenery" of the town was described as "varied and picturesque" with "an appearance of being well kept, and the roads are noticeably good."

By the end of the century a gazetteer with entries for each city and town in Massachusetts described "the substantial old court house, with its massive columns and yellow dome; the county jail; the house of the boat club on the bank of the Charles; the beautiful building of the Dedham Historical Society; the ample town-hall, erected in 1867 as a memorial of the fallen brave; the old cemetery and the beautiful modern one; and the new library building with its 10,000 volumes,— making a list of attractions such as few towns can show." On the north side of Court Street was a building called the "Flat Iron Building" due to its wedge-like shape.

A bathhouse was constructed in 1898 along the banks of Mother Brook.

=== Trees ===
In 1832, a tree in West Dedham, today Westwood, was named for the fortuneteller Moll Pitcher, who enjoyed the shade beneath the tree during her travels to the area. On a hot summer day, she once asked a workman for a sip of his cider. When he refused, she broke her clay pipe in two and told the worker that the same thing would happen to his neck. She also said that the Nanhattan Street house he was working on would burn to the ground, which it did years later.

In the mid-1800s stood a large sycamore tree at the intersection of Court and Church Streets. Tradition holds that this was the tree to which those who broke the law would be tied and whipped. It was also the location of the town's pillory.

== Schools ==
Though Dedham had the first public school in the country, the Commonwealth sued the Town in 1819 for failing to hire a grammar school teacher.

As early as 1848, Rev. Dr. Alvan Lamson of the First Church and Parish in Dedham was making the argument that the districts should be abolished and Horace Mann said that the law allowing districts was "beyond comparison, the most pernicious law ever pass in the Commonwealth on the subject of schools." The districts were discontinued in 1866 when the Town purchased all 11 buildings for a total of $49,180 and returned their value to the taxpayers of the respective districts.

The Quincy School was built in to accommodate the new German residents of East Dedham who were settling in the area. The Avery School was already in the neighborhood, but it was becoming overcrowded. The May 1872 Town Meeting appropriated funds to build a two room schoolhouse for 60 children ages five to 10. In the 1880s, it had to be expanded to four rooms. The lot had been purchased from the German Quincy Homestead Association on July 6, 1872 for $750 and named in honor of Boston Mayor Josiah Quincy, the trustee of the Association.

The first public school system in the country had, by 1890, grown "complete system of graded schools, which are provided for in thirteen buildings having a value of about $60,000; to which has recently been added a new high school building in a central location in which have been embodied all known improvements." On January 11, 1895, the citizens of the town gathered in Memorial Hall to celebrate the 250th anniversary of the founding of the first free, tax supported public school in the nation. A "felicitous" speech was made by Governor Frederic T. Greenhalge and an "historical address" was made by Rev. Carlos Slafter. Lieutenant Governor Roger Wolcott, Judge Ely and the Honorable F.A. Hill also spoke.

=== Dedham High School ===
As early as 1827, the Commonwealth of Massachusetts required all towns with more than 500 families to establish a free public high school. Beginning in 1844, the School Committee repeatedly began recommending that the town establish a high school. It was not until 1850 when, under threat of a lawsuit, that the town meeting voted to "instruct the Town's School Committee to hire a building and teacher, and establish a High School according to law." A sum of $3,000 was appropriated to support it.

The new school was opened on September 15, 1851 with 42 students. Charles J. Capen, a private high school teacher, was hired to teach at the new school, and his classroom above the Masonic Hall was rented by the town. The building, located at 25 Church Street, was previously Miss Emily Hodge's Private School. The school used this space from 1851 to 1854, at which point it was moved to the Town House on Bullard Street. In 1855, a new school was built on Highland Street and dedicated on December 10. A new school was built on Bryant Street in 1887, and students moved in on October 3.

== Parishes, precincts, and new towns and neighborhoods ==
With the division and subdivision of so many communities, Dedham has been called the "Mother of Towns."

Community	Year incorporated as a town	Notes
Dover	1836	Then known as Springfield, it became a precinct of Dedham by vote of Town Meeting in 1729; relegated to a parish the same year by the General Court. Created the Fourth Precinct by the General Court in 1748.
Hyde Park	1868	800 acres taken from Dedham, along with land from Dorchester and Milton. Dedham opposed the taking of its land to create the new town.
Norfolk	1870	Separated from Wrentham.
Norwood	1872	Created a precinct with Clapboard Trees (Westwood) in 1729. Became its own precinct in 1734.
Wellesley	1881	Separated from Needham
Millis	1885	Separated from Medfield.
Avon	1888	Part of the Dorchester New Grant of 1637. Separated from Stoughton.
Westwood	1897	Joined with South Dedham (Norwood) to create Second Precinct in 1729. Returned to First Precinct in 1734. In 1737 became Third Precinct. Last community to break away directly from Dedham.

=== Dover ===
At the 1729 election, the village reasserted its political power by taking back control of the Board of Selectmen. Four men from the village were elected, including Ebenezer Woodward, along with one man from the Springfield area of town. Shortly thereafter, Springfield became its own precinct in an apparent quid pro quo. It later became Dover in 1836.

=== Norwood ===
The south precinct had long complained that they did not receive a fair share of services from the Town. In 1872, the complaint was focused around the lack of opportunities for their children to attend the high school. In that year, they seceded and formed the town of Norwood, Massachusetts.

=== Westwood ===
In 1897, the third parish became the final area to break away directly from Dedham, incorporating as Westwood. There had been calls for a partition since at least 1857.

=== Waldeddo and Back Bay ===
In the 1850s, a proposal was made by James Tisdale to take portions of Dedham, Dover, and Walpole to create a new town of Waldeddo, but nothing came from it.

In the late 1800s, when the Commonwealth of Massachusetts was filling in Boston's Back Bay, most of the landfill came from nearby Needham. When the gravel pits there were exhausted, they turned to other area communities, including Dedham.

=== Subdivisions and neighborhoods ===
In the 19th century many former farms became businesses and homes for those who commuted into Boston.

Nathaniel Whiting arrived in Dedham in 1641 and over the course of the next 182 years he and his descendants owned mills along Mother Brook and a great swath of farmland. In 1871 William Whiting, the last member of the family to own a mill, sold the remainder of the family farm. Charles Sanderson began laying it out in a subdevelopment to become known as Oakdale. By 1895, Oakdale was still largely woodland, with only about a dozen houses clustered around the Ashcroft railroad station. (Note: Those who lived there included Horatio Turner, Charles Turner, and Mrs. Clapp.) Today, Whiting Ave is home to both the High School and the Middle School, and Sanderson Avenue runs into Oakdale Square.

In 1867, the Farrington farm was laid out into house plots by the Elmwood Land Company and became the Endicott neighborhood, and in 1873 the Whiting/ Turner tract of land was developed into Ashcroft. Fairbanks Park was developed in 1895.

East Dedham, with many immigrants working in the mills, was "seen as both part of the town but also as separate and alien," and sometimes even "completely unfamiliar and threatening." The Dedham Transcript had a separate section on the third page for East Dedham, along with news from other local towns. As the neighborhood had its own shops, churches, and schools, it is likely that the residents from East Dedham likely had little interaction with those from the Village.

== Notable visits ==
=== James Monroe ===
During his 1817 tour of the country, President James Monroe visited Dedham and stayed at the home of future Congressman Edward Dowse. A large number of people escorted him from the Norfolk border to the Boston line, including artillery and Crane's Ist Division of Militia. Monroe reviewed the troops on the Town Common. He met residents the next morning when he walked from Dowse's home to Polly's Tavern.

=== John Quincy Adams ===
In September 1827, while John Quincy Adams was vising Massachusetts, he toured a mill owned by Benjamin Bussey on Mother Brook. (Note: Adams would serve as one of the executors of Bussey's estate.) The Dedham Woolen Mill was one of the first companies in the country to undertake the entire process of taking raw material and producing textiles in a single mill. Adams did not hold out high hopes for the mill's success, although it did turn out to be highly successful.

=== Fisher Ames ===
After he retired from Congress due to his poor health, prominent Federalist officials continued to visit Fisher Ames in Dedham. In 1800, Alexander Hamilton took a tour of New England. His stated objective was to disband the army, but his real reason was to try and convince people to vote for Charles Cotesworth Pinckney instead of John Adams.

On his way to Boston, where a dinner was held in his honor that included Governor Caleb Strong, the Lt. Governor, former senator George Cabot, Francis Dana, chief justice of the Massachusetts Supreme Judicial Court, and several congressmen and clergy, Hamilton stopped in Dedham. He was the guest of Fisher Ames on June 24, 1800. Next door, Fisher's brother Nathaniel was not pleased with the visit, writing in his journal that "A. Hamilton the high Adul[tere]r run after a tiptoe thro' Dedham."

On July 20, 1803, Gouverneur Morris also visited Fisher Ames in Dedham.

== Crime ==
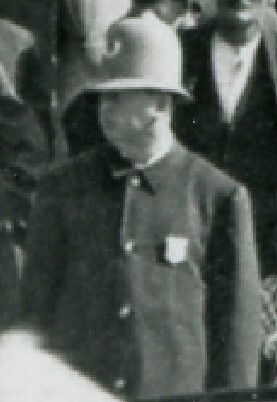
A Dedham police officer on duty in the late 19th century.

In 1876, the year the Dedham Police Department was established, Officer Philander Young (Note: Police Badge #2) arrested an East Dedham resident for clogging on the Sabbath.

Mrs. Bodensholtz killed her neighbor, Caroline Leibold, in Germantown in 1882. Alcohol was frequently mentioned in crime stories, with phrases such as "he was a man much addicted to the use of strong drink." The Boston Globe often reported on crime in Dedham, including assaults, arson, bomb-throwing, and joy riding with stolen horse and buggies, but the local press largely ignored it. The Globe would often run multiple stories and include gruesome details, especially if the accused was Irish.

=== The Fairbanks case ===
The south face of the courthouse in Dedham Square, as it appeared in 1839.

The first major trial to be held at the new courthouse was that of Jason Fairbanks. He was courting Elizabeth Fales and the two carried on a "desultory and somewhat ambiguous relationship" marked by Fales' parents' disapproval, Fairbanks' poor health, and Fales continually breaking up with Fairbanks and then taking him back again. Fairbanks had told a friend that "planned to meet Betsey, in order to have the matter settled" and that he "either intended to violate her chastity, or carry her to Wrentham, to be married, for he had waited long enough." On May 18, 1801, Fales met Fairbanks in a "birch grove next to 'Mason's Pasture'" and told him that she could not marry him.

Fales was stabbed 11 times, including once in the back, and her throat was slashed. Fairbanks staggered to her home, covered in blood, and told her family that she had committed suicide. He also told them that he had also attempted to take his own life, but was unable to, and that accounted for his wounds. Fairbanks was too injured to be moved, and was left to recuperate at the Fales' home. He did not attend Fales' funeral, but 2,000 others did, probably making it the largest crowd ever assembled in Dedham.

Interest in the case involving two prominent families was so great that the trial was moved to the First Parish Meetinghouse across the street. When that venue proved to still be too small, the trial again moved to the Town Common. The defense told the jury that Fairbanks did not have the use of his right arm and was sickly in general. (Note: Hanson believes Fairbanks was also suffering from an undiagnosed case of tuberculosis.) They suggested, though Fairbanks later strongly denied it, that the lovers had a murder-suicide pact. The jury found him guilty and he was sentenced to death.

On the night of August 17, Fairbanks escaped from jail along with several others. A $1,000 bounty offered for his capture. The murder, trial, and the escape set off a media firestorm. Fairbanks was captured in Skeensborough, New York while waiting for a steamer to bring him to Canada. Fairbanks was not returned to Dedham, the site of his previous escape, but was instead brought to the Suffolk County Jail in Boston.

On September 10, 1801, he was returned to Dedham from the Boston jail and was hanged. In addition to a military presence to ensure he did not escape again, "the 10,000 people who showed up at the Town Common to witness the execution were five times the town's population at the time." It set a new record for the largest crowd in Dedham.

Within days of the execution, a number of books and pamphlets were written about the case, including "one of the earliest novels based on an actual murder case," the Life of Jason Fairbanks: A Novel Founded on Fact.

=== 1820 duel ===
A barber living in the village received a note from a painter on January 13, 1820. The two men had previously boarded together. The note stated

Sir--from the many insults received, and attempts made on my life by you, I cannot rest easy until I get satisfaction: and as I am about to leave Dedham, it does hurt my feelings (though mean indeed) to fight with a barber. So I shall expect to meet you in half an hour from this time, at the back of Mr. C's shop."

The barber responded thusly:

Your challenge is accepted. I will meet you at the time and place appointed. My life, my honour shall pay, or yours shall be my sacrifice.

The two men met in the ally just after the sun had set for a duel. They were each accompanied by a second, and started pacing off steps. When they turned, the painted pointed his pistol at the barber and pulled the trigger. The barber immediately collapsed and the painter ran off.

The barber was then helped to a nearby doctor by his second and several bystanders who came when they heard gunfire. It was later discovered that the barber and the two seconds conspired to only load the pistols with powder, but not bullets, to satisfy the anger of the painter but not put anyone in actual danger.

=== Domestic violence ===
In 1881 and 1882, three men killed their wives in East Dedham. George Nagle was a wool sorter who lived in a tenement near the intersection of Bussey St and Mill Lane. He killed his wife, Belle, with an axe, and then tried to kill himself with the same tool in July 1881. A month later, John Gately beat his wife to death and was sent to an insane asylum for the rest of his life. John and Mary lived on Thomas Street. In March 1882, 85 year old John Sullivan, an 85 year old wool spinner, slashed Bridget Sullivan's throat before cutting his own. Bridget was 60 at the time and both were Irish immigrants. They met working in Barrow's Mill.

=== Other hangings ===
As the shiretown, Dedham was home to both the Norfolk County Courthouse and the Norfolk County Jail. It thus also was the site of a number of hangings.

- On October 7, 1802, Ebenezer Mason was hung on the Town Common for the murder of his brother-in-law, William Allen, in Medfield.
- In 1804, John Battus of Canton was hung for murdering a young girl.
- In July 1829, John Bois was hung for murdering his wife. The execution was set for 9 a.m. in an attempt to limit the crowds, but they were unsuccessful as large numbers attended anyway.
- On August 8, 1862, George Hersey of South Weymouth was hung at the jail with attendance permitted only by invitation and the presentation of a ticket. (Note: Hersey was later implicated in the deaths of several other women, including his wife.)
- James H. Costley was hung in the jail on June 25, 1875, for the murder of Julia Hawke. The Phoenix Hotel was full in the days prior to the execution with both spectators who came to watch and Boston police officers who were called in to help keep the peace.

== Other ==
Louis Mellen drowned in Wigwam Pond. A heat wave in July 1811 killed several people.

=== Gay-Ellis wedding ===
In 1800 Colburn Gay of Dedham wished to marry Sarah Ellis of Walpole. The laws at the time said that a wedding must take place in the town of the bride, however Gay insisted that Rev. Thomas Thatcher preside. Thatcher was the minister in Dedham's third parish, however, and could not officiate outside of the town's borders. To resolve this dilemma the couple stood on the Walpole side of Bubbling Brook, and Thatcher stood on the Dedham side. They were married across the stream and had two children before Sarah died in 1810.

=== Post offices ===
There were seven post offices, mostly in rail depots or grocery stores, in the 19th century. Dr. Elisha Thayer (Note: Thayer had a son, George H. He also owned a large vacant meadow near the intersection of High and East Streets which grew Acorus calamus. Thayer lived next door to Jeremiah Shuttleworth. He was also the organist at St. Paul's. He had three sons, Elisha, John, and George, and a daughter, Maria. Elisha Jr. became a veterinarian, and John led the orchestra at the Allin Congregational Church by the time he was 15 or 16 years old. John was a violinist and later an organist there, before moving to St. Paul's.) an apothecary named Tower, and Ambrose Galucia (Note: Galucia had a son, Warren. He previously worked as a house painter.) were postmasters. Thayer ran the post office office from a small addition on the east side of his house from 1833 until his resignation in 1855. Galucia was postmaster at the Memorial Hall post office before leaving for California during the California Gold Rush.

Landon Moore attempted to rob a post office in 1877.

=== Animals ===
In August 1810, it was thought a dog "under symptoms of madness" bit 12 cows and gave them an illness which killed them. "Some idle fellow" in the town then when around shooting every dog he could find, even shooting into houses and killing dogs wrapped up in women's aprons who were trying to protect them. The town was divided between those who argued for the "Rights of Dogs" and those who thought they should be exterminated.

In 1870, a horse owned by John Gardiner broke free from the carriage to which it was hitched and took off down River Place. Crowds tried to stop it when it reached Memorial Hall, but the horse turned instead and ran into Andrew Norris' grocery store on the first floor. The front assembly of the carriage, which was trailing behind, hit a granite hitching post, and turned the assembly vertically so that one wheel was on the air and the other was scraping along the ground. The horse bolted through the store, past a rack of glassware and crockery, and then out the other door without causing any damage.

A bear escaped from the estate of eccentric sewing machine magnate William Emerson Baker in 1888 and spent the night under the porch of the Allin Congregational Church before returning to Needham the next day.

=== Organizations ===
The Norfolk House was also the site where "on June 4, 1810, in an expression of public outrage, a number of Dedham citizens assembled" and founded the Society in Dedham for Apprehending Horse Thieves. Today the "Society is the oldest continually existing horse thief apprehending organization in the United States, and one of Dedham's most venerable social organizations."

There was a chapter of the Knights of Labor, (Note: The East Dedham chapter was organized around 1884, with Thomas William Killikelly as a leader.) the Young Men's Catholic Lyceum, the International Organisation of Good Templars, and the Reform Club.

In East Dedham, there were a large assortment of organizations, some of which survive as of 2024. For German speakers, there was the Germania Singing Society on Rockland Street, the Liederkranz Club, the Fidelia Musical and Enducational Society, the Duetschen Frauen-Verein, and the Gesang-Verin Harmonia. There were fraternal organizations such as the Royal Society of Good Fellows, the Royal Arcanum, and the Quinobequin Colony Number 200 of the United Order of Pilgrim Fathers.

Also in East Dedham were also organizations that provided support to newcomers, such as the Saint Raphel's chapter of the Catholic Order of Foresters, the Ancient Order of Hibernians, and the Irish Society for the Irish, as well as the Italian-Americans Citizens Club for the Italians. The Women's Christian Temperance Union, the Dedham Women Christian Union, and the Sons of Temperance were all active in the neighborhood as well. At the Methodist Church in East Dedham, the Junior Epworth League and the Young People's Society of Christian Endeavour were also active.

East Dedham's Baptist church had a club for young people, and the Webster Union was a debating society to discuss political affairs. The Walnut Hill Whist Club, the Anagram and Pinochle Club, the Walnut Hill Club, the Owl Club, and the Social Five were additional social groups in the neighborhood.

A Masonic lodge opened in 1803.

=== Mechanic's Hall ===
Many organizations met at Mechanic Hall, which was described "the centre of gravity in the [East Dedham] Village." It was built by William T. Tapley and hosted a variety of parties, fairs, dances, lectures, and other events. (Note: Tapley was born in Maine in 1823. He worked as a teenager in the spinning room at Barrow's Mill and became a loom fixer. When Merchant's Woolen Mill bought the operation, he was promoted to overseer of the weaving department. He was in that position for 23 years. He opened a grocery store in 1863 and subsequently added a meat market. Mechanic's Hall was on the second floor of the building. He wanted to commission a copy of the Emancipation Group statue to place in East Dedham Square but, for unknown reasons, this project never came to fulfilment.) A letter writer to the Dedham Transcript wrote that "Deprive of us everything else--don't let us have any Selectmen, or Town Pump, in this part of town-- but 'Spare, O spare us our Mechanics' Hall'" The hall was located on the north side of High Street, where the O'Neil Drive housing complex is in 2025.

=== Ghosts ===
When spiritualism swept over the country in the 1840s, many in Dedham took interest and attempted to communicate with the dead.

A few decades later, in October 1877, a "spook" was seen in the Old Village Cemetery. P.H. Hurley was walking through the graveyard when he was accosted by the ghost. The spook then took off, leaping over a tall fence. Later the same night, John Ward saw the spook in Brookdale Cemetery.

The spook seen by Hurley and Ward was described as being over seven feet tall and wearing a long blue coat. Others reported seeing a spectral woman in the cemeteries. She was silent and still, pointing at various graves.

One report indicated that the spook liked eggs, so the police investigated a grocery store. Women of the town made sure to confirm their husbands' identities before letting them into the house, and a woman in Oakdale fired a shotgun at the spook.

Around midnight on November 8, neighbors on Village Avenue heard shots fired in the cemetery. Caretaker John Carey found blood scattered on the white marble gravestone of Lavinia Turner the next morning, as well as a bloody handprint on the iron rail surrounding the family plot. There was also trampled grass and indications of a struggle. Constable de Morse thought the red liquid was blood, but Police Chief William F. Drugan ruled that it was simply red ink. Drugan also declared that the "spook sensation" was not real but was the work of pranksters.

The press, including the Dedham Transcript and newspapers from Boston and New York, covered the story extensively. One reporter spent the night in the cemetery, hoping to catch a glimpse of the spook. By the end of November, when a ghost was seen in a Palmer, Massachusetts cemetery and the newspaper coverage moved there, the sightings in Dedham died down.

=== Independence Day ===
In the early 1800s, residents would gather at a tavern for a feast, to drink toasts, read the United States Declaration of Independence, and to celebrate the "Glorious Fourth" of July.

By the mid-point of the century, a new annual tradition of a Parade of Antiques and Horribles was established in Dedham and in much of New England. Mocking the Boston parade of the Ancient and Honorable Artillery Company of Massachusetts, older residents and young people would dress in outlandish costumes.

In the 1880s, a tradition started where youths would climb to the top of the Church of the Good Shepherd and ring the bell at midnight on the 4th of July. This tradition would evolve into the bell being rung to signal the start of wagons being brought to Oakdale Square and lit aflame in the early 20th century.

== Works cited ==
- Ames, Nathaniel (1998). Hanson, Robert B. (ed.). The Diary of Dr. Nathaniel Ames of Dedham, Massachusetts. Picton Press.
- Austin, Walter (1912). Tale of a Dedham Tavern: History of the Norfolk Hotel, Dedham, Massachusetts. Priv. print. at the Riverside Press.
- Beach, Seth C.; Sanford, Carroll; Smith, Nathaniel; Whitney, Mrs. S.W.; Maynard, Mrs. C.E.; Capen, Charles James (1878). Covenant of the First Church in Dedham: With Some Facts of History and Illustrations of Doctrine; for the Use of the Church. H.H. McQuillen.
- Bowers, Claude Gernade (1925). Jefferson and Hamilton: The Struggle for Democracy in America. Houghton Mifflin.
- Burgess, Ebenezer (1840). Dedham Pulpit: Or, Sermons by the Pastors of the First Church in Dedham in the XVIIth and XVIIIth Centuries. Perkins & Marvin.
- Byrne, William; Leahy, W.A.; Dowling, Austin; Young, E.J.A.; Finen, J.E. (1899). Introductory. The Hurd & Everts co. pp. 323–24.
- Clarke, Wm. Horatio (1903). Mid-Century Memories of Dedham. Dedham Historical Society.
- The Commonwealth of Massachusetts (1910). Election Statistics.
- Cook, Louis Atwood (1918). History of Norfolk County, Massachusetts, 1622–1918. Vol. 1. S.J. Clarke publishing Company. p. 425.
- The Commonwealth of Massachusetts (1931). Election Statistics 1931.
- Davis, Stephen Robert (1973). From Plowshares to Spindles: Dedham, Massachusetts 1790–1840 (Ph.D thesis). University of Wisconsin.
- Dedham Historical Society (2001). Images of America: Dedham. Arcadia Publishing. ISBN 978-0-7385-0944-0.
- Dedham Historical Society; Dedham Square Circle (2010). "Historic Dedham Village: A Self-guided Walking Tour" (PDF) (1 ed.). Town of Dedham Economic Development Department. p. 12. Archived from the original (PDF) on 2016-12-07.
- Hanson, Robert Brand (1976). Dedham, Massachusetts, 1635–1890. Dedham Historical Society.
- Haven, Samuel Foster (1837). An Historical Address Delivered Before the Citizens of the Town of Dedham, on the Twenty-first of September, 1836, Being the Second Centennial Anniversary of the Incorporation of the Town. H. Mann.
- Hill, Don Gleason (1892). "The Dedham Institution for Savings". Dedham Historical Register. 3 (4 ed.). Dedham Historical Society: 145–152.
- Hurd, Duane Hamilton (1884). History of Norfolk County, Massachusetts: With Biographical Sketches of Many of Its Pioneers and Prominent Men. J.W. Lewis & Company.
- Free Public Library Commission of Massachusetts (1908). Report of the Free Public Library Commission of Massachusetts. Secretary of the Commonwealth.
- Knudsen, Harold M. (2025). Fisher Ames, Christian Founding Father & Federalist. Liberty Hill Publishing.
- Lockridge, Kenneth (1985). A New England Town. New York: W.W. Norton & Company. ISBN 978-0-393-95459-3.
- Massachusetts Board of Library Commissioners (1899). Report of the Free Public Library Commission of Massachusetts.
- Lord, Robert Howard; Sexton, John E.; Harrington, Edward T. (1944). History of the Archdiocese of Boston, 1886–1943. Sheed & Ward.
- Morris, Gouverneur (1888). The Diary and Letters of Gouverneur Morris: Minister of the United States to France... C. Scribner's Sons.
- Neiswander, Judith (2024). Mother Brook and the Mills of East Dedham. Damianos Publishing. ISBN 978-1-941573-66-2.
- Parr, James L. (2009). Dedham: Historic and Heroic Tales From Shiretown. The History Press. ISBN 978-1-59629-750-0.
- Puleo, Stephen (2010). A City So Grand. Beacon Press.
- Secretary of the Commonwealth (1908). Election Statistics.
- Simon, James F. (2003). What Kind of Nation: Thomas Jefferson, John Marshall, and the Epic Struggle to Create a United States. Simon and Schuster. ISBN 978-0-684-84871-6.
- Slack, Charles (2015). Liberty's First Crisis: Adams, Jefferson, and the Misfits Who Saved Free Speech. Atlantic Monthly Press. ISBN 978-0802123428.
- Slafter, Carlos (1905). A Record of Education: The Schools and Teachers of Dedham, Massachusetts 1644–1904. Dedham Transcript Press. "1642–43."
- Smith, Frank (1936). A History of Dedham, Massachusetts. Transcript Press, Incorporated.
- Tise, Larry E. (1998). The American counterrevolution: a retreat from liberty, 1783–1800. Stackpole Books. p. 421. ISBN 978-0-8117-0100-6.
- Worthington, Dr. Arthur Morton (1958). "History of St. Paul's Church in Dedham 17581958" (PDF). St. Paul's Church (Dedham, Massachusetts). p. 10.
- Warren, Charles (1931). Jacobin and Junto: Or, Early American Politics as Viewed in the Diary of Dr. Nathaniel Ames, 1758–1822. Harvard University Press.
- Worthington, Erastus (1827). The History of Dedham: From the Beginning of Its Settlement, in September 1635, to May 1827. Dutton and Wentworth. pp. 106–107.
- Worthington, Erastus (1869). Dedication of the Memorial Hall, in Dedham, September 29, 1868: With an Appendix. John Cox Jr.
