= James Richardson (Massachusetts) =

American lawyer, businessman, and politician

- Born: 1771
- Died: June 7, 1858 (aged 86–87); Dedham, Massachusetts, U.S.
- Education: Harvard College
- Occupations: Lawyer, businessman
- Known for: Onetime employer of Louisa May Alcott
- Political party: Federalist

James Richardson Sr. (1771 – June 7, 1858) was a lawyer, a business and civic leader, and a member of the Massachusetts Senate from Dedham, Massachusetts. He is remembered for employing Louisa May Alcott for several weeks in 1851, an experience that Alcott later based one of her stories on.

== Biography ==
Richardson was born in 1771. A 1797 graduate of Harvard College, he was a resident of Dedham, Massachusetts.

Richarson was the law partner of Fisher Ames. He was also the president of the Dedham Mutual Fire Insurance Company and a founder of the Norfolk and Bristol Turnpike. He was a part owner of and agent for the Dedham Manufacturing Company.

Richardson served in the Massachusetts Senate, as a member of the Federalist Party, during the 1813–14 session. He once gave an address to a crowd that included President Andrew Jackson.

Richardson was an incorporater of St. Paul's Church and a member of a number of Dedham's civic and social organizations.

After a prayer service to celebrate Dedham's Bicentennial in 1836, 600 people processed to a pavilion erected to host a dinner on the land of John Bullard a few rods to the west. Richardson presided at this dinner, assisted by John Endicott, George Bird, Abner Ellis, Theron Metcalf, and Thomas Barrows as vice presidents. A blessing was asked by the Rev. John White of the West Parish and thanks returned by the Rev. Dr. Jonathan Homer of Newton. After the cloth was removed, Richardson gave a number of toasts, interspersed with music from the band.

Richardson died in Dedham on June 7, 1858, at the age of 86 or 87 (sources vary).

=== Employer of Louisa May Alcott ===
Abigail "Abba" Alcott ran an "intelligence office" to help the destitute find employment. When Richardson came to Abba seeking a companion for his frail sister who could also help out with some light housekeeping, her daughter Louisa May Alcott volunteered to serve in the house filled with book, music, artwork, and good company on Highland Avenue. Alcott imagined the experience as something akin to being a heroine in a Gothic novel as Richardson described their home in a letter as stately but decrepit.

Richardson's sister, Elizabeth, was 40 years old and suffered from neuralgia. Elizabeth was shy and did not seem to have much use for Alcott. Instead, Richardson spent hours reading her poetry and treating her like his confidant and companion, sharing his personal thoughts and feelings with her. Alcott reminded Richardson that she was supposed to be Elizabeth's companion, not his, and she was tired of listening to his "philosophical, metaphysical, and sentimental rubbish." He responded by assigning her more laborious duties, including chopping wood and scrubbing the floors.

Alcott quit after seven weeks in the winter of 1851, when neither of two girls her mother sent to replace her decided to take the job. As she walked from his home to Dedham station, she opened the envelope he handed her with her pay. She was so unsatisfied with the four dollars ($154.80 in 2025) she found inside that Alcott family tradition states she mailed it back to him in contempt.

Alcott's story "How I Went Out to Service", based on her experience working in the Richardson home, was published in 1874 in the New York City-based magazine The Independent.

== Sources ==
- Haven, Samuel Foster (1837). An Historical Address Delivered Before the Citizens of the Town of Dedham, on the Twenty-first of September, 1836, Being the Second Centennial Anniversary of the Incorporation of the Town. H. Mann.
- Parr, James L. (2009). Dedham: Historic and Heroic Tales From Shiretown. The History Press. ISBN 978-1-59629-750-0.
- Worthington, Arthur Morton (1958). History of St. Paul's Episcopal Church in Dedham (PDF).
