= Joseph Day =

Joseph Day may refer to:

- Joe Day (ice hockey) (born 1968), American ice hockey center
- Joe Day (footballer) (born 1990), English football goalkeeper
- Joseph Day (inventor) (1855–1946), inventor of the modern two-stroke engine
- Joseph A. Day (born 1945), Canadian senator
- Joseph P. Day (1874–1944), American real estate entrepreneur
- Joseph Day (Massachusetts politician), representative to the Great and General Court

== See also ==
- Joseph Daye (born 1990), Australian rule footballer
