= Merrill Ellis =

Merrill Ellis may refer to:

- Merrill Leroy Ellis, American composer
- Merrill D. Ellis, representative to the Great and General Court
