= Senator Endicott =

Senator Endicott may refer to:

- Charles Endicott (1822–1899), Massachusetts State Senate
- John Endicott (Dedham) (1764–1857), Massachusetts State Senate
