= Daniel Marsh (disambiguation) =

Daniel Marsh (born 1973) is an Australian cricketer.

Daniel or Dan Marsh may also refer to:

- Daniel Webster Marsh (1838–1916), Canadian politician
- Dan Marsh (born 1956), American former professional wrestler
- Daniel L. Marsh (1880–1968), president of Boston University
- Daniel G. Marsh (born 1937), American politician in the state of Washington
- Daniel Marsh (Massachusetts politician), representative to the Great and General Court
- Dan Marsh (curler) (born 1988), Canadian curler
- Daniel William Marsh (born 1997), American murderer and perpetrator of the murders of Claudia Maupin and Oliver Northup
