= Edward Keyes =

Edward Keyes may refer to:

- Edward J. Keyes (1859–1929), member of the Wisconsin State Assembly
- Edward Lawrence Keyes (1843–1924), American urologist
- Edward L. Keyes (politician) (c. 1812–1859), Massachusetts politician
