= George S. Winslow =

American politician

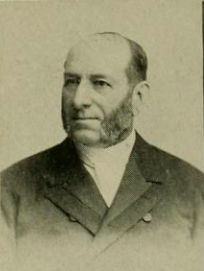
George S Winslow

George S. Winslow (born April 6, 1829) was a politician from South Dedham, later Norwood, Massachusetts.

Winslow was born April 6, 1829, in South Dedham, Massachusetts, which later became Norwood, and was educated in the public schools. He was the senior partner of the firm of Winslow Brothers, tanners of sheep leather. In 1892, as the representative from the First Norfolk District, he served on the committees on mercantile affairs and parishes and religious societies.
