= Dedham Bank =

Bank in Dedham, Massachusetts, US

The Dedham Bank was a bank in Dedham, Massachusetts. It was located on the corner of High and Pearl Streets.

Those involved with the establishment of the bank in 1814 include Elijah Crane, Willard Gay, Samuel Haven, John Guild, Jabez Chickering, Horatio Townsend, Jeremiah Baker, and Martin Marsh. Early meetings of the bank were held at the Norfolk House. The founders asked Nathaniel Ames to be a director, but he declined, citing the large number of lawyers involved with its creation. Ten months after creation, however, the bank had 66 shareholders in Dedham, Boston, Bellingham, Medway, Dover, Walpole, Franklin, Needham, Woburn, Roxbury, Medfield, Sharon, Wrentham, Hopkington, Bridgewater, Canton, and Sherburne.

Its first president was Willard Gay who lived and carried on the business of packing beef and pork at West Dedham. He resigned his office May 20, 1829 and was succeeded by John Worthington Ames. Upon the decease of Ames in 1833, Dr. Jeremy Stimson was elected on February 14, 1834. Stimson held the office of president until the bank was reorganized as a national bank on February 7, 1865. At that time they had a reelection and Lewis H. Kingsbury was elected. Kingsbury resigned May 20, 1873. Ezra W. Taft was then elected and served at least until 1884.

Cashiers of the bank include Chickering from March 25, 1814, to December 19, 1823, Ebenezer Fisher, Jr. from December 19, 1823, to January 1, 1847, Kingsbury from January 1, 1847, to February 7, 1865, John H.B. Thayer from February 7, 1865, to his death in April 1873, (Note: Thayer was 42 at the time and the son of postmaster Elisha Thayer. He had previously been a teller since 1852.) and Kingsbury from May 20, 1873, to at least 1883.

In January 1824, the public became aware that Chickering had gone bankrupt and went to New York to try to recoup some of his money. On February 2, the directors and shareholders of the Dedham Bank, where Chickering was a cashier, were informed that $35,000, about 1/3 of the bank's total assets, was also missing. (Note: This is the equivalent of roughly $1 million in 2024 dollars.) His widow was eventually able to pay off the bank and other individuals to whom Chickering owed money. In 1820, the Commonwealth of Massachusetts sued the bank for the irregular way they handled banknotes, drafts, and loans.

The Dedham Bank was established with a capital of $100,000. The capital of the bank in 1839 was $150,000 and in 1883 was $300,000.

== Works cited ==
- Clarke, Wm. Horatio (1903). Mid-Century Memories of Dedham. Dedham Historical Society.
- Hanson, Robert Brand (1976). Dedham, Massachusetts, 1635-1890. Dedham Historical Society.
- Hurd, Duane Hamilton (1884). History of Norfolk County, Massachusetts: With Biographical Sketches of Many of Its Pioneers and Prominent Men. J. W. Lewis & Company.
- Neiswander, Judith (2024). Mother Brook and the Mills of East Dedham. Damianos Publishing. ISBN 978-1-941573-66-2.
