= Jeremiah Shuttleworth =

Merchant and postmaster from Dedham, Massachusetts

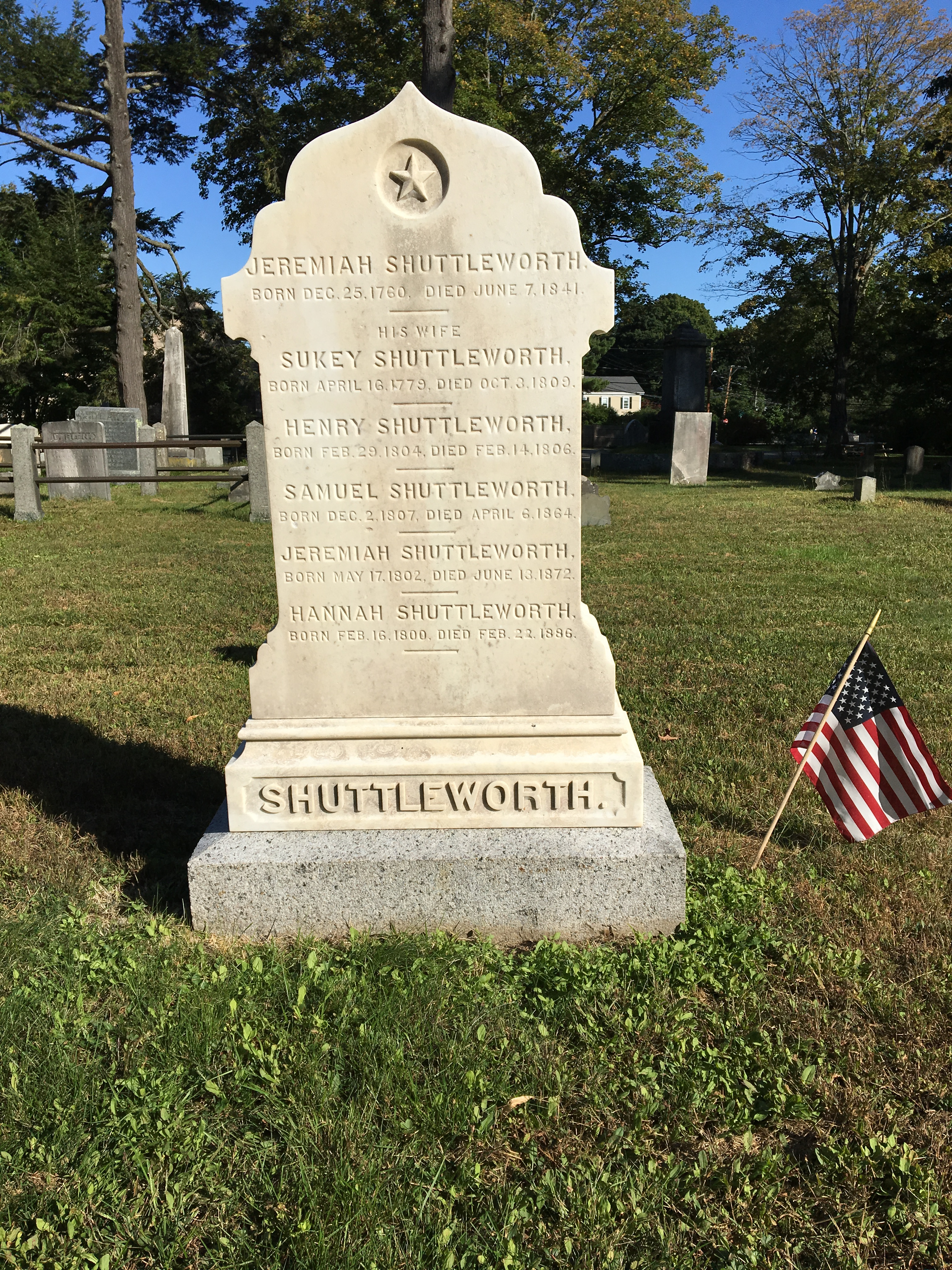
Shuttleworth grave

Jeremiah Shuttleworth (December 24, 1760 – October 11, 1858) was a merchant and postmaster from Dedham, Massachusetts.

== Personal life ==
Shuttleworth married Susanna "Sukey" Richards on February 1, 1798, and they were the parents of four children, including Hannah, Sam, and Jerry. (Note: Sam and Jerry cultivated a garden at the corner of Byrant Street and Eastern Avenue.) He was an incorporator of St. Paul's Church and served on the vestry. His sister, Melitiah Shuttleworth, married Nathaniel Ames.

Shuttleworth died October 11, 1858.

== Career ==
Jeremiah ran the West India Goods store out of his home, located at the corner of Church and High Streets. It was likely the first permanent grocery store in Dedham.

On April 1, 1795, Shuttleworth was appointed Dedham's first postmaster. (Note: Clarke has the date being 1793.) The post office, one of the first in the country, was housed in the store, where he would place all the mail on a table. Residents would come into the store and help themselves to any letters addressed to them. Shuttleworth was replaced as postmaster 38 years later, in 1833, by Dr. Elisha Thayer. At his resignation in 1833, it was thought he was the oldest postmaster in the country.

== House ==
Shuttleworth leased a lot of land from St. Paul's Church at the corner of Church and High Streets. The minister, William Montague, referred to the intersection as "Jere Square" in his honor. The window shutters, which were painted green, were never opened. In front of the store were scales for weighing hay.

For many years, important notices were tacked to a buttonwood tree in front of the house. (Note: It eventually was toppled during Hurricane Gloria in 1985.) It was where, for example, the first notice of Abraham Lincoln's death was posted. Local tradition holds that the first notice posted there was a $50 reward for a stolen horse. During the Civil War, when a soldier drilling pulled out an umbrella during a shower, he was hung in effigy from the tree.

Shuttleworth left the house to Hannah, and upon her death she left it to the Dedham Historical Society. The Historical Society sold the Shuttleworth home, which was moved to Bryant St, and custom built a new building for themselves on the lot.

In 1936, Charles Mills painted a portrait of his house, where his shop and post office were. It is currently in the collection of the Historical Society and was cleaned and conserved in 2016.

== Works cited ==
- Parr, James L. (2009). Dedham: Historic and Heroic Tales From Shiretown. The History Press. ISBN 978-1-59629-750-0.
- Dedham Historical Society (2001). Images of America: Dedham. Arcadia Publishing. ISBN 978-0-7385-0944-0.
- Worthington, Dr. Arthur Morton (1958). "History of St. Paul's Church in Dedham 1758-1958" (PDF). St. Paul's Church (Dedham, Massachusetts). p. 10.
- Briggs, Samuel; Ames, Nathaniel (1891). The Essays, Humor, and Poems of Nathaniel Ames, Father and Son: Of Dedham, Massachusetts, from Their Almanacks, 1726-1775, with Notes and Comments. Short & Forman.
- Smith, Frank (1936). A History of Dedham, Massachusetts. Transcript Press, Incorporated.
- Hanson, Robert Brand (1976). Dedham, Massachusetts, 1635-1890. Dedham Historical Society.
- Clarke, Wm. Horatio (1903). Mid-Century Memories of Dedham. Dedham Historical Society.
