= Daniel Covell =

American politician

Daniel Covell represented Dedham, Massachusetts in the Great and General Court.

== Works cited ==
- Worthington, Erastus (1827). The history of Dedham: from the beginning of its settlement, in September 1635, to May 1827. Dutton and Wentworth.
