= John W. Ames (politician) =

American politician

John Worthington Ames (October 22, 1793 – October 31, 1833) represented Dedham, Massachusetts in the Great and General Court. He was the son of Fisher Ames and the brother of Seth Ames. He never married and always lived with his mother.

He was born October 22, 1793, in Dedham, Massachusetts. Ames was a lawyer and president of the Dedham Bank from June 16, 1829, until his death. He died October 31, 1833.

== Works cited ==
- Worthington, Erastus (1827). The history of Dedham: from the beginning of its settlement, in September 1635, to May 1827. Dutton and Wentworth.
- Hurd, Duane Hamilton (1884). History of Norfolk County, Massachusetts: With Biographical Sketches of Many of Its Pioneers and Prominent Men. J. W. Lewis & Company.
