= Ebenezer Fisher =

American politician

Ebenezer Fisher represented Dedham, Massachusetts in the Great and General Court. The Fisher School, now in Westwood, Massachusetts, was named in his honor. He served as selectman in 1785. He voted against the Norfolk and Bristol Turnpike as a member of the legislature in 1802. Fisher Ames was a driver for the road, and his brother Nathaniel believed his no vote made him a "traitor" motivated by "an ancient prejudice against the Old Parish," i.e. modern day Dedham.

== Works cited ==
- Worthington, Erastus (1827). The history of Dedham: from the beginning of its settlement, in September 1635, to May 1827. Dutton and Wentworth.
- Slafter, Carlos (1905). A Record of Education: The Schools and Teachers of Dedham, Massachusetts 1644-1904. Dedham Transcript Press. "1642-3."
- Hanson, Robert Brand (1976). Dedham, Massachusetts, 1635-1890. Dedham Historical Society.
