= Richard Ellis (Dedham) =

American politician

Richard Ellis represented Dedham, Massachusetts in the Great and General Court from 1825 to 1831 and in 1833. He also served for 29 nonconsecutive years as town clerk in Dedham, beginning in 1815.

== Works cited ==
- Worthington, Erastus (1827). The History of Dedham: From the Beginning of Its Settlement, in September 1635, to May 1827. Dutton and Wentworth. p. 1.
