= William Francis Ray =

American politician

William Francis Ray (born March 2, 1854) was a Republican politician from Franklin, Massachusetts.

== Personal life ==
Ray was born March 2, 1854, in Franklin. He attended the Franklin Public Schools, Dean Academy, and Brown University.

== Career ==
Ray was a woollen manufacturer.

== Political life ==
Dean was elected to the School Committee and the Board of Selectmen in Franklin. As a member of the Massachusetts House of Representatives, he served on the committees on public service, manufactures, and the child labor commission.

As a Massachusetts State Senator is 1892, Ray represented the Second Norfolk District, which consisted of Avon, Bellingham, Brookline, Dedham, Dover, Foxborough, Franklin, Medfield, Medway, Millis, Needham, Norfolk, Norwood, Sharon, Stoughton, Walpole, Wellesley, and Wrentham. He was chairman of committee on constitutional amendments and a member ofcommittee on railroads.

Second Norfolk District election, 1892
Party	Candidate	Votes	%	±%
Republican	William F. Ray	4,376	50.99%	
Democratic	Clement K. Fay	3868	45.07%	
Prohibition	Charles E. Miles	337	3.93%	
Total votes		8,581	100.00%	N/A
