= John Dean (Massachusetts politician) =

American politician

John Dean 3d represented Dedham, Massachusetts, in the Great and General Court in 1835.
