= Daniel Slattery house =

Historic house in Dedham, Massachusetts

Coordinates: 42.2455°N 71.17558°W

The Daniel Slattery house was the site of the first Catholic mass in Dedham, Massachusetts.

== First mass ==
By the early 1800s, a few Catholics had settled in Dedham. At the time, Dedham and the surrounding area was part of the missionary territory of St. Mary's in Waltham. Though a large area, stretching as far west as Concord and as far south as Walpole, it is estimated there were fewer than 300 Catholics. It was difficult for many to travel to Waltham, and so Father James Strain offered to travel halfway to meet the Catholics in the outlying areas.

Slattery offered his home and to provide Strain with transportation. The first Mass in Dedham was celebrated in Sunday, May 15, 1843, with eight Catholics present. An altar was set up by the window. For the next three years Slattery's 17-year-old brother-in-law, John Doggett, would bring Strain from Waltham and back to minister to the needs of the small congregation. (Note: Some sources Strain came weekly while others say monthly.) (Note: Father Strain was born in Ireland in 1815, and was received into the Diocese of Boston in 1840. He had a rather tumultuous career here, and bounced around not only from parish to parish, but even to several other dioceses, before eventually returning to Ireland in 1850.)

== Location of the home ==
While the Slattery home is still standing, at the corner of Washington and Worthington Streets, at the time of the first mass it was on the corner of Washington and High, where the Police Station sits in 2019. During the Revolution, the Worthington Street land was the site of an encampment for French troops under the command of Count Rochambeau.

The home's original location was first owned by Daniel Morse and then became the homestead of John Hunting, the first ruling elder of the First Church and Parish in Dedham in 1638. Slattery purchased it from Martin Marsh.

== Daniel Slattery ==
Slattery was born in Ireland in 1805 and moved to Dedham while still young. He married Catherine Doggett of Dedham on April 14, 1837, at the Cathedral of the Holy Cross. Together they had five sons. When Catherine died in 1849, the hands of the clock were stopped at the hour of her death. The unusual occurrence of a Catholic funeral mass elicited much interest around the town. He married again to Margaret Coleman of Dedham, and together they had one son and two daughters.

His oldest son, Patrick, who was 23 at the outbreak of the American Civil War, enlisted for 99 days with the Minutemen and then with the 14th Massachusetts Artillery for the duration of the war. Another son, Charles, who was 17, also enlisted and died in Virginia. Patrick returned home unharmed and died in the early 1900s. (Note: Patrick, known as "Pat Slat," was the only "Irish boy" in the Dedham Public Schools at the time.) As of 1923, he had two sons, Edward and Thomas, living in Canton, Massachusetts and a daughter in Dedham.

Slattery was well regarded among his fellow Dedhamites. He was well educated, had a practical knowledge of agriculture and arbor culture, and set out many of the trees in Dedham. He also held "considerable property." Slattery moved to Needham in 1854 and died on May 2, 1856.

== Works cited ==
- Byrne, William; Leahy, W. A.; Dowling, Austin; Young, E. J. A.; Finen, J. E. (1899). Introductory. The Hurd & Everts co. pp. 323–324.
- Smith, Frank (1936). A History of Dedham, Massachusetts. Transcript Press, Incorporated.
- Clarke, Wm. Horatio (1903). Mid-Century Memories of Dedham. Dedham Historical Society.
