= Edward L. Keyes (politician) =

American politician

Edward L. Keyes (circa 1812-June 6, 1859) represented Dedham, Massachusetts in the Great and General Court in both the House of Representatives and the Senate. He also served on the Massachusetts Governor's Council and in the Constitutional Convention of 1853.

== Personal life ==
Keyes was born to Dr. Justus and Betsey (née Corey) Keyes. He was the brother of General Erasmus Darwin Keyes.

He had only a common school education with one or two terms at an academy. He had a keen taste for literature, and his youthful ambition led him to employ his leisure time in the acquisition of knowledge. He distinguished himself in the Lyceums and was regarded as a brilliant youth. He went to Boston as a clerk in a wholesale store, and availed himself of the facilities for acquiring knowledge so abundantly afforded by that city.

He is buried in the Brooks tomb in Medford, Massachusetts.

== Career ==
While in Boston, Keyes wrote articles for the daily papers. He took a leading part in the formation of the Free Soil Party. In 1844, he bought the printing establishment of the Dedham Gazette.

He died from softening of the brain, in the hospital in Taunton, Massachusetts on June 6, 1859, at the age of 47. He represented Dedham for two years in the House of Representatives. In 1851 and 1852 he represented the County of Norfolk in the State Senate. In 1848, he was a member of the Executive Council, and in 1853, represented the town of Abington, Massachusetts in the Constitutional Convention. He was also one of the Commissioners for the erection of the State Alms Houses. For several years, "Keyes was one of the foremost young men of the Massachusetts."

== Works cited ==
- Worthington, Erastus (1827). The history of Dedham: from the beginning of its settlement, in September 1635, to May 1827. Dutton and Wentworth.
