= Norfolk and Bristol Turnpike =

Road in Massachusetts

The Norfolk and Bristol Turnpike is a road in Massachusetts. In Boston, it is known as Washington Street and in Dedham it runs along Washington Street and Court Street.

== History ==
In 1802, Fisher Ames and a group of others requested that the Great and General Court lay out a new turnpike between the Norfolk County Courthouse and Pawtucket. They agreed (over the no vote of Dedham's representative, Ebenezer Fisher) and the road was charted on March 8, 1802. It was finished in 1806 at a cost of $225,000, or $6,440 a mile. It was the best and fastest highway in America at the time, allowing for mail to be delivered between Boston and Providence in under three hours.

It served as a straighter alternative to two roads between Boston and Providence: the Lower Boston Post Road (via Norwood and Foxborough), and the road via Walpole and Wrentham. The turnpike ran from Dudley Square to the border of Rhode Island and beyond to downtown Pawtucket. The turnpike was constructed as an entirely new road, except for a part through North Attleborough (which is the only part bypassed today by US 1). The southern half of the turnpike, which had some steep grades and bypassed towns where travelers wanted to stop, saw little use and remained a dirt road until the construction of US 1. The part of the turnpike within the Roxbury limits was laid out as a public road in June 1857 and named Shawmut Avenue, as an extension of the existing Shawmut Avenue from Boston. The adjacent part of the turnpike within West Roxbury was named Shawmut Avenue as well on February 3, 1858.

== Buildings ==
19 Court Street in Dedham sits along the Court Street section of the road.

== Works cited ==
- Hanson, Robert Brand (1976). Dedham, Massachusetts, 1635-1890. Dedham Historical Society.
- Parr, James L. (2009). Dedham: Historic and Heroic Tales From Shiretown. The History Press. ISBN 978-1-59629-750-0.
