= John Endicott (Dedham) =

American politician

Senator of Massachusetts
- In office 1817-1819; 1831-1833

Representative to the Great and General Court
- In office 1805-1814; 1816-? 1830-? 1834-?

Personal details
- Born: February 14, 1764 Dorchester, Province of Massachusetts Bay (present-day Canton, Massachusetts)
- Died: January 31, 1857 (aged 92) Dedham, Massachusetts, USA

John Endicott (February 14, 1764 – January 31, 1857) was an American politician from Dedham, Massachusetts. Endicott was born in Canton, Massachusetts on February 14, 1764, and lived on East Street in Dedham.

Endicott held many public offices and was an active and influential citizen of Dedham. He was a Representative to the Great and General Court from 1805 to 1814, and again in 1816, 1830, and 1834. He became a Senator from 1817 to 1819 and from 1831 to 1833. Endicott was also a member of the Massachusetts Constitutional Convention of 1820–1821 and a Presidential Elector in 1824, as well as being a member of the Executive Council from 1827 to 1830.

Endicott was chosen deacon of the First Church and Parish in Dedham in 1833 and held that office for many years. He was the first President of the Norfolk Mutual Fire Insurance Company.

Endicott died in Dedham, January 31, 1857. In 1867, the East Street School, located at the site of the present day St. Luke's Church, was renamed the Endicott School in his honor.

== Works cited ==
- Dedham Historical Society (2001). Dedham. Arcadia Publishing. ISBN 978-0-7385-0944-0.
- Worthington, Erastus (1896). "Report of the Curators". The Dedham Historical Register. Dedham Historical Society.
- Slafter, Carlos (1905). A Record of Education: The Schools and Teachers of Dedham, Massachusetts 1644-1904. Dedham Transcript Press. "1642-3."
