= History of Dedham, Massachusetts, 1700–1799 =

Between 1700 and 1799, Dedham become one of the largest and most influential country towns in Massachusetts. As the population grew and residents moved to outlying areas, battles for political power took place. Similar battles were taking place within the churches, as liberal and conservative factions bristled at paying for ministers with whom they had differences of theological opinion. New parishes and precincts were formed, and eventually several new towns broke away. In 1793, Dedham became the shiretown of the newly created Norfolk County.

The town became less insular and less homogeneous as available land was used up and contact with other communities grew. Though more economically and socially equal than other communities, a lower class of residents began to emerge and depend on charity. Nearly every able man took part in the American Revolution. The population at the time was between 1,500 and 2,000 people, of which 672 men fought in the Revolution and 47 did not return.

== Government ==
=== Selectmen ===
Selectmen who served between 1640 and 1740 were almost always among the wealthiest 20% of the town. In any given year a majority of the board were among the richest 10%.

Year first elected	Selectman	Total years served
1702	Thomas Fuller	5
1702	Joseph Fairbanks	3
1704	Nathaniel Gay	7
1704	Amos Fisher	2
1705	John Fuller	2
1705	Benjamin Colburn	2
1706	John Smith	3
1707	Timothy Whiting	8
1710	Robert Cook	1
1711	John Ellis	3
1712	Daniel Wight	2
1714	Joseph Ellis	5
1714	Michael Metcalf	7
1715	Comfort Starr	3
1716	John Metcalf	27
1717	Nathaniel Kingsbury	2
1717	William Bullard	8
1718	William Avery	5
1718	John Hunting	1
1719	Jeremiah Fisher	6
1719	Samuel Ware	1
1719	Joseph Dean	2
1720	Jabez Pond	2
1721	John Gay	4
1721	Joseph Smith	1
1722	Ebenezer Woodward	3
1724	John Everett	8
1727	Joseph Smith	2
1729	Eleazer Ellis	2
1731	Nathaniel Chickering	5
1731	John Fisher	2
1731	Joseph Richards	5
1732	Ephraim Wilson	7
1736	Richard Everett	5
1736	Jeremiah Fisher	6
1736	Josiah Fisher	7
1739	Jonathan Onion	3
1739	Jonathan Whiting	2
1741	Joseph Wight	14
1741	Nathaniel Battle	3
1742	Eleazer Fisher	2
1742	Joseph Ellis	2
1743	Eliphalet Pond	16
1744	William Everett	5
1744	Richard Ellis	3
1744	Joshua Ellis	3
1746	James Draper	1
1746	Lusher Gay	2
1747	Michael Bacon	1
1748	Hezekiah Allen	2
1749	Ezra Morse	4
1749	Nathaniel Colburn	1
1750	Benjamin Fairbanks	3
1750	Nathaniel Wilson	3
1753	Nathaniel Sumner	19
1753	Isaac Whiting	12
1753	Joseph Chickering	2
1755	Jonathan Metcalf	1
1755	Stephen Badlam	4
1755	Jonathan Day	3
1756	James Draper	2
1758	William Avery	13
1758	Daniel Gay	3
1758	Ralph Day	2
1759	John Jones	3
1760	Ebenezer Everett	4
1762	David Fuller	2
1762	Samuel Colburn	5
1762	Daniel Chickering	4
1764	Samuel Dexter	5
1764	Ebenezer Newell	7
1768	Joseph Haven	5
1768	Joseph Guild	7
1769	Abijah Draper	5
1770	William Whiting	3
1771	William Bullard	2
1773	Isaac Bullard	5
1773	Nathaniel Kingsbury	5
1773	Isaac Colburn	2
1773	Nathaniel Battle	1
1774	Jonathan Dean	1
1775	Samuel Damon	3
1775	Ichabod Gay	4
1776	Isaac Whiting	2
1776	George Gould	7
1776	Eleazer Allen	1
1777	Jeremiah Kingsbury	1
1778	Ebenezer Battelle	2
1778	John Ellis	13
1778	Ichabod Ellis	1
1779	Ebenezer Smith	2
1779	Ebenezer Battle	1
1780	Abner Ellis	1
1780	Abiathar Richards	1
1783	Lemuel Richards	1
1784	Ebenezer Gay	1
1785	Ebenezer Fisher	1
1785	Benjamin Fairbanks	1
1786	Aaron Fuller	16
1786	Joseph Gay	1
1787	Eliphalet Pond	16
1787	Nathaniel Whiting	4
1787	James Kingsbury	1
1788	Joseph Whiting	3
1791	Eliphalet Thorp	1
1792	George Ellis	10
1792	Calvin Whiting	14

==== 1704 elections ====
Prior to 1704, nearly all the selectmen came from the old village center despite greater numbers of residents moving to more outlying areas. At the March 6 Town Meeting that year, three of the five incumbent selectmen, Samuel Guild, Joshua Fisher, (Note: The son of Joshua Fisher.) and Joseph Fairbanks, all men from the village, were voted out of office.

In their place were elected three newcomers, Ashael Smith, Amos Fisher, and Nathaniel Gay, who collectively had just one year prior service on the board, but at least two of them came from outlying areas. One of the selectmen reelected that year was also from an outlying area, and the third newcomer was probably in sympathy with them, giving them a majority of four to one. Gay also replaced Guild as Town Treasurer.

Those from the village, upset that they had been turned out of power, began complaining that the election was illegal because there had not been enough warning given in advance of the town meeting that served as an election. The old board of selectmen, including those voted out of office, invalidated the election and called for a new one to be held on March 27. In that election Guild was returned to both his posts as selectman and treasurer, but Fisher and Fairbanks both lost again and were replaced with men from other parts of town. Those from outside the village maintained a three-vote majority after the new election.

Still upset with the outcome, several men from the village took the issue to the Suffolk County Court where they argued that both March elections were invalid. The court ordered a new election and, on April 17, the same men chosen at the March 6 election were elected again. It took several years for the villagers to reassert their political power.

==== 1726 and 1727 elections ====
Tensions built in 1725 and 1726 between those who lived in the center village and those who lived in the outlying parts of town. In 1726, the central village recaptured the entire board of selectmen. On March 6, 1727, Town Meeting assembled to elect selectmen; it became so contested that it took two days to finish. Instead of the customary method of voting for the entire board at the same time, individuals stood for election for single seats and were voted through a secret, written ballot.

Every incumbent lost their seat, the first time this had happened since 1690. Five new men were elected, including three from the Clapboard Trees section of town and two from the village who were sympathetic for their calls to separate as an independent town.

==== 1728 election ====
In March 1728, just before voting for Selectmen, the Town Meeting adopted a resolution that allowed any man with any property to be granted a vote. This extended the franchise to a much larger number of men, most of whom came from outlying areas of town, and was in direct violation of a provincial law. The meeting then elected by secret ballot three men, a majority, from the outlying areas of town: John Gay, Comfort Starr, and Joseph Smith.

The meeting then descended into chaos. The Moderator, Ebenezer Woodward, expressed doubts or perhaps even tried to adjourn the meeting over concerns about those not entitled to vote casting ballots. As moderator, he could be held liable. John Gay, Benjamin Gay, and Joseph Smith took their muskets and demanded that Woodward leave the meeting. When he refused, Woodward was hit and the meeting adjourned. The three belligerents were arrested and fined £10 each, but the election was not overturned.

==== 1729 election ====
At the 1729 election the village took back control of the board. Four men from the village were elected, including Woodward, along with one man from the Springfield area. Shortly thereafter, Springfield became its own precinct in an apparent quid pro quo.

==== 1730s and 1740s elections ====
By the 1730s and 1740s, sectional strife in town had grown to such a degree that the General Court had to impose several settlements on the town. It resulted in a truce whereby each of the five selectmen seats was unofficially allocated with one going to those in the village, or First Precinct, one going to residents of First Precinct who attended church in the more liberal Third Precinct, and one each to a resident from the Second, Third, and Fourth Precincts.

=== Moderator ===
An act of the colonial legislature gave town meetings the right to elect their own moderators in 1715, but this had already been in practice for several years in Dedham. The moderator was sometimes a selectman, and was always a respected member of the community. The first moderator to come from outside the village center, Joseph Ellis, was elected in 1717. Ellis, a resident of "the southerly part of town," was elected selectman in the same election.

=== Town Clerk ===
Year first elected	Town Clerk	Total years served
1709	Joseph Wright	13
1720	Jeremiah Fuller	6
1727	John Gay	2
1729	William Avery	1
1731	John Metcalf	16
1747	Eliphalet Pond	12
1755	Jonathan Metcalf	1
1759	William Avery	4
1764	Samuel Dexter	5
1769	Isaac Whiting	6
1773	Joseph Guild	4
1778	Ebenezer Battelle	2
1780	Abner Ellis	1
1781	Ichabod Gay	2
1783	Nathaniel Kingsbury	1
1784	Isaac Bullard	3
1787	Eliphalet Pond	25

=== Conventions ===
==== Inflation ====
The Massachusetts Bay colony was always short of gold and silver and printed a great deal of paper money, which caused inflation that favored farmers but angered business interests. By 1750, however, the colony recalled its paper currency and transitioned to a specie currency based on the British reimbursement (in gold and silver) for its spending in the French and Indian wars. The large-scale merchants and Royal officials welcomed the transition but many farmers and smaller businessmen were opposed.

A convention was held in Concord to address the issue in 1779, and Dedham was represented by Fisher Ames. When another session was held in October, to consider the price controls that seemed to be doing more harm than good, Ames again represented Dedham and argued against the controls.

==== Constitutional ====
On December 10, 1787, voters gathered in town meeting and elected Thomas Thatcher and Fisher Ames to represent the town in the convention to ratify the United States Constitution. Both spoke in favor of the new Constitution at the convention.

=== Representation in the General Court ===
At the November 1727 town meeting, Joseph Ellis, a resident of the Clapboardtrees section of town, was elected as representative to the General Court. Following the election, 49 men from the central village petitioned the General Court to say that his election was illegal but were unsuccessful; Ellis went on to serve six terms.

Year	Representative	Representative
1700	Daniel Fisher	
1701	Daniel Fisher	
1702	Daniel Fisher	
1703	Daniel Fisher	
1704	Daniel Fisher	
1705	John Fuller	
1706	John Fuller	
1707	John Fuller	
1708	John Fuller	
1709	John Fuller	
1710	John Fuller	
1711	John Fuller	
1712	Daniel Fisher	
1713	Daniel Fisher	
714	Eleazer Kingsbury	
1715	John Fuller	
1716	John Fuller	
1717	John Fuller	
1718	Jonathan Metcalf	
1719	Samuel Guild	
1720	Joseph Ellis Jr.	
1721	Joseph Ellis Jr.	
1722	Joseph Ellis Jr.	
1723	Thomas Fuller	
1724	Thomas Fuller	
1725	Joshua Fisher	
1726	Joshua Fisher	
1727	Joseph Ellis Sr.	
1728	Joseph Ellis Sr.	
1729	Eleazer Ellis	
1730	Joseph Ellis	
1731	Joseph Ellis	
1732	Joseph Ellis	
1733	Joseph Ellis	
1734	Joseph Ellis	
1735	John Metcalf	
1736	John Metcalf	
1737	John Metcalf	
1738	John Metcalf	
1739	John Metcalf	
1740	John Metcalf	
1741	Joseph Ellis	
1742	Joseph Richards	
1743	Richard Ellis	
1744	Joseph Richards	
1745	Joseph Richards	
1746	Joseph Richards	
1747	Joseph Richards	
1748	Joseph Richards	
1749	Joseph Richards	
1750	Joseph Richards	
1751	Joseph Ellis Jr.	
1752	Joseph Richards	
1753	Joseph Richards	
1754	Joseph Richards	
1755	Voted not to send a representative	
1756	Nathaniel Sumner	
1757	Nathaniel Sumner	
1758	Joseph Ellis Jr.	
1759	Joseph Ellis Jr.	
1760	Jonathan Metcalf	
1761	Eliphalet Pond	
1762	Nathaniel Sumner	
1763	Eliphalet Pond	
1764	Samuel Dexter	
1765	Samuel Dexter	
1766	Samuel Dexter	
1767	Samuel Dexter	
1768	Samuel Dexter	
1769	Nathaniel Sumner	
1770	Nathaniel Sumner	
1771	Abner Ellis	
1772	Abner Ellis	
1773	Abner Ellis	
1774	Samuel Dexter	Abner Ellis
1775	Samuel Dexter	Abner Ellis
1776	Abner Ellis	Jonathan Metcalf
1777	Abner Ellis	
1778	Jonathan Metcalf	
1779	Jonathan Metcalf	
1780	Abner Ellis	
1781	Abner Ellis	Ebenezer Battle
1782	Joseph Guild	
1783	Joseph Guild	
1784	Nathaniel Kingsbury	
1785	Nathaniel Kingsbury	Samuel Dexter
1786	Nathaniel Kingsbury	
1787	Nathaniel Kingsbury	
1788	Fisher Ames	Nathaniel Kingsbury
1789	Joseph Guild	
1790	Joseph Guild (Note: The town first elected Nathaniel Ames, but he refused the office.)	
1791	Nathaniel Ames (Note: Upon his election, Ames noted in his diary that he accepted "upon their acceptance to dispense with my attendance... I consider myself as a nominal Representative only to save the Town from being fined.")	
1792	Nathaniel Ames	Nathaniel Kingsbury
1793	Nathaniel Ames	Nathaniel Kingsbury
1794	Nathaniel Kingsbury	Isaac Bullard
1795	Isaac Bullard	
1796	Isaac Bullard	
1797	Isaac Bullard	
1798	Isaac Bullard	
1799	Isaac Bullard	

=== Congress ===
Fisher Ames, a member of the Federalist Party, was elected to the First United States Congress, beating Samuel Adams for the post. In Dedham, 28 men cast ballots and Ames received 20 votes. James Madison wrote to Thomas Jefferson that "Ames is said to owe his success to the votes of negroes and British sailors smuggled under a very lax mode of conducting the election there."

Ames served in Congress from March 4, 1789, to March 3, 1797. During the First Congress, he was chairman of the Committee on Elections.

== Religion ==
=== First Church ===
==== Ministers ====
First Church Minister	Years of service
Joseph Belcher	1693-1723 (Note: Belcher continued to preach until 1721 when illness prevented him.)
Samuel Dexter	1724-1755
Jason Haven	1756-1803

At the end of 1691, the congregation voted again to accept the half-way covenant and declared that John Allin, their former minister, was right to have tried to get them to accept it. A new minister, Joseph Belcher, began preaching in March 1692 and was installed on November 29, 1693. Samuel Sewall attended his ordination. Belcher, who was orthodox in his theology and lofty in his preaching, remained in the pulpit until the autumn of 1721 when illness prevented him from preaching.

Belcher's calm demeanor was likely the reason Dedham did not get swept up in the hysteria surrounding the witch trials in Salem and surrounding communities. He tried to return to a voluntary contribution for his salary, in place of the taxes previously imposed, but the system failed and the Town reinstituted a tax.

In 1721 Belcher came down with a "dangerous paralysis" and went to Roxbury to the home of his son-in-law, Rev. Thomas Walter. The church occasionally took up collections to support him during this time. Though he was unable to work, there was a custom in New England of lifetime contracts for clergy. The church used visiting preachers while Belcher was still alive.

Samuel Dexter was hired as the minister following Belcher's death in 1723.

==== Dissent and division of the church ====
===== Early 1700s =====
As the town grew and residents began moving to outlying areas, the town was divided into parishes and precincts. Both could hire their own ministers and teachers, while precincts could also elect their own tax assessors and militia officers.

By 1706, some members of outlying areas were attending church in other towns. Town Meeting voted to grant the selectmen the power to allow those individuals to deduct the money they paid for ministers outside Dedham from the taxes they paid for Dedham's minister.

A group who lived north of the Charles River asked to increase the tax rate by £8 so that they might hire a minister in 1709. Within two years, the General Court set them off as the new town of Needham.

In 1717, the Town Meeting voted to exempt residents from paying the minister's salary if they lived more than five miles from the meetinghouse. Those who chose to do so could begin attending another church in another town. This was the first time the Town conceded that those who lived in outlying parts of town should not have to support a church they did not attend. In May 1721, Town Meeting refused to allow an outlying section of town to hire their own minister, prompting that group to seek to break away as the town of Walpole.

===== 1720s and 1730s =====
Others in outlying parts of town were still not pleased, and regularly challenged the new minister, Samuel Dexter. When a number of them walked out of the church, it took an entire Council of Churches to get them to return in July 1725. Animosities remained between Dexter and some of the more vocal dissidents even after they returned to the church. In 1727, though residents from outlying areas tried to pack the town meeting, they failed in votes to move the meeting house or to hire two ministers at the Town's expense. Similar motions were rejected multiple times throughout 1728.

The Clapboard Trees section of town had more liberal religious views than did those in either the original village or South Dedham. After a deadlocked Town Meeting could not resolve the squabbling between the various parts of town, the General Court first put them in the second precinct with South Dedham, and then in the first precinct with the village.

This did not satisfy many of them, however, and in 1735 they hired Rev. Josiah Dwight along with some like minded residents of the village. First Church, however, refused to release any of its members to form a new church. Undeterred, those who broke away called a Council of Churches from the surrounding towns and had their action ratified.

Creating a new church was an act of dubious legality and the General Court once again stepped in, this time to grant them status as the third precinct and, with it, the right to establish their own church in 1736. The General Court also allowed more liberal minded members of conservative churches to attend the more liberal churches in town, and to apply their taxes to pay for them.

===== 1740s =====
The preaching of Jonathan Edwards and George Whitefield helped to revive the churches of Dedham during the Great Awakening. Whitefield actually preached in Dedham on April 26, 1745. The theological debates that arose as a result, however, helped bring about a split in the churches into different denominations. Dexter was privately in support of the movement, but did not push his congregation in that direction. The people of the Clapboardtrees district embraced it, while those in South Dedham rejected it.

=== South Church ===
South Church Minister	Years of service	Notes
Thomas Balch	June 30, 1736 – January 8, 1774	
Jabez Chickering	July 3, 1776 – March 12, 1812	

In the 1760s, Thomas Balch served as minister in South Dedham. His daughter, Mary, married Manasseh Cutler, and Cutler studied under the elder Balch for the ministry. Another of Balch's daughters, Hannah, married his successor, Jabez Chickering. (Note: Hannah and Jabez were the parents of Jabez Chickering.)

=== West Church ===
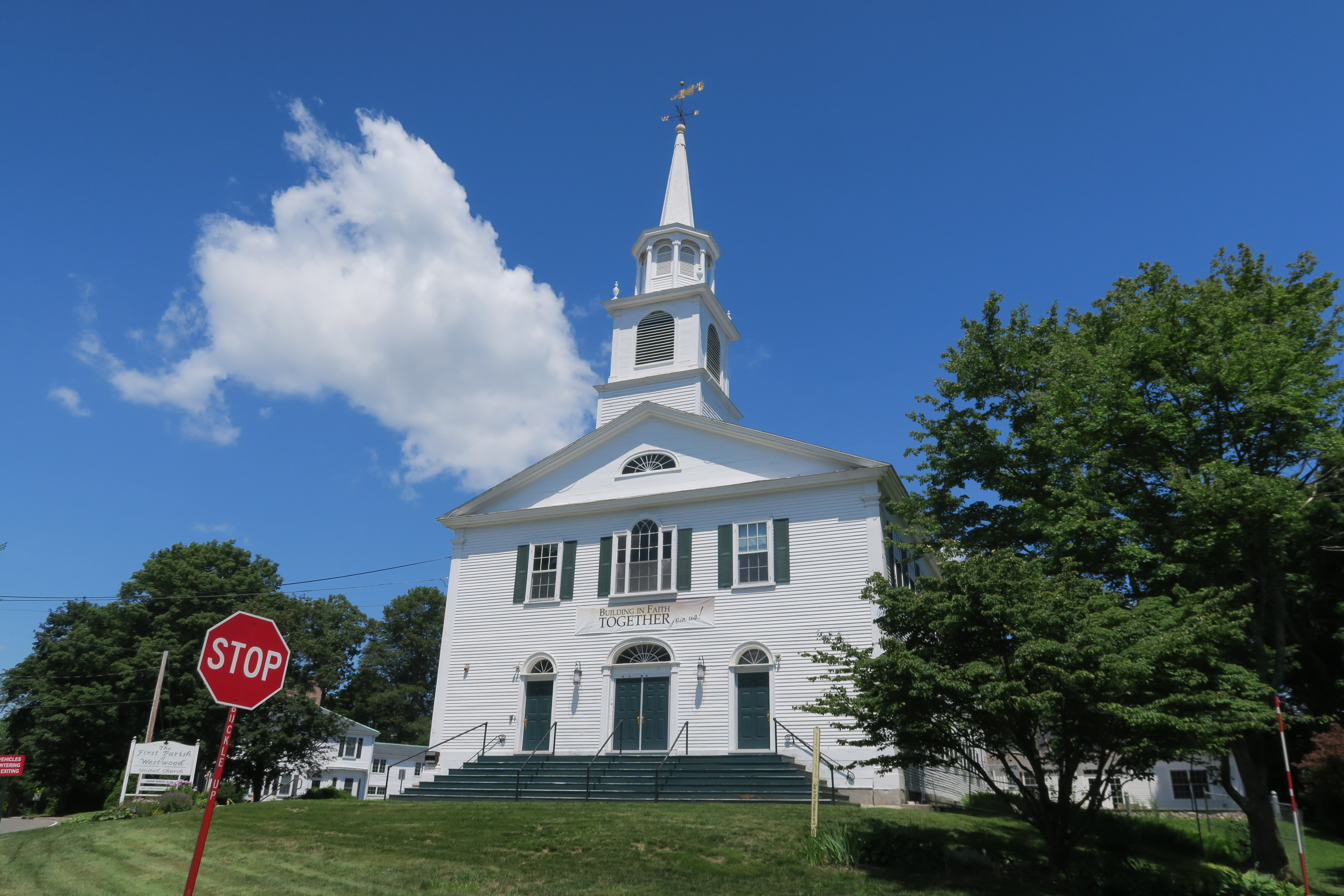
Clapboardtrees Parish, today the First Parish of Westwood

West Church Minister	Years of service	Notes
Josiah Dwight	June 4, 1735 – 1742	(Note: Dwight was graduated from Harvard College in 1687.)
Andrew Tyler	November 1743-December 17, 1772	(Note: Tyler was born in Boston and was graduated from Harvard College in 1731.)
Thomas Thatcher	June 7, 1780 – October 19, 1812	

The West Church, or Clapboardtrees church, is today known as the First Parish of Westwood.

=== Anglican church ===
==== Churches ====
A group of Anglicans began meeting in Clapboardtrees in 1731. The first Episcopal church, a simple structure measuring 30' by 40', was built on Court Street in 1758 by a Mr. Durpee. (Note: The church was diagonally across from where the current church stands.) When the main beam of the church was raised, it broke causing 12 men to fall. None were injured. It was dedicated in 1761, but it was only plastered and permanent seats installed in 1771. When Norfolk County was established in 1792, the congregation offered their building for use of the courts, but it was in such poor condition that the county declined.

The people of Dedham stoned the church during the American Revolution and then took it over for use as a military storehouse. From then on, Clark secretly conducted services in his house.

The congregation attempted to move the church to Franklin Square in 1797, but the entire structure collapsed, sending a cauldron of bats out of the belfry. It was reconstructed in that location 1798 using portions of an abandoned church in Stoughton.

==== Ministers ====
Anglican Church Minister	Years of service	Notes
William Clark	1760-1777	
William Montague	1794-1818	

The first minister, Rev. William Clark, held controversial Tory views. By March 1777, Clark announced that he would cease preaching, rather than eliminating prayers for the king. Two months later, he was charged by the Board of Selectmen in Dedham of being a traitor to the American Revolution.

After being denied bail, he was brought to Boston to stand before a military tribunal. He refused to pledge allegiance to the Commonwealth, and so was sent onto a prison ship for 10 weeks. In June 1778, Fisher Ames obtained a pass for him and Clark was allowed to leave America.

In 1791, the congregation regrouped and called William Montague away from Old North Church. Montague received a salary of £100 sterling. He remained in the Dedham church until 1818. (Note: Burgess has his departure as being in 1815.)

==== Colburn grant ====
Samuel Colburn (Note: Colburn was a descendant of Nathaniel Colburn and John Hunting.) died in the Crown Point Expedition of 1756. Though he was not an Anglican, he left almost his entire estate to the Anglican community in Dedham to establish St. Paul's Church. The grant, consisting of 135 acres (55 ha) of land and other cash and property, was hindered only by a life estate left to his mother.

Some of the eight parcels were on the outskirts of town, along Mother Brook or up in Sandy Valley, but most were centered around modern day Dedham Square. The main portion ran from Maple Place to Dwight's Brook, and 10 acres bounded by High, Court, and School streets.

When Colburn's mother died in 1792, Montague began laying out streets and house lots on the property. The first street Montague laid out, modern day Church Street, (Note: It was known at the time as New Street.) was the first street in Dedham to be laid out with house lots on either side, as opposed to simply being a road to connect one farm to another. Norfolk Street was next, followed by School street. (Note: Norfolk Street was originally known as Cross Street, and School Street was originally Back Street.) Montague rented out the parcels in 999 year leases. One lessee, Samuel Richards, hired Charles Bulfinch to design his house on the corner of Highland and Court Streets.

== Schools ==
At the same meeting in which residents of outlying areas were allowed to stop paying for the central village's minister, it was also agreed to allow the school to rotate through town on a seasonal basis.

With the town growing and multiple schoolhouses being built, the school was split into districts in 1756. The districts were not established by law, however, until 1789.

== Lifestyle of residents ==
During the early years of the town, land was distributed to all the men who lived there. By 1713, however, there was no more land to be distributed; anyone who wished to own land would have to purchase it. By 1729, the tax rolls stopped listing the names of the most prominent citizens first, as had been done by the rank-conscious first settlers, and instead listed names alphabetically. (Note: Until 1662, the minister's name appeared first on the tax list and the elder was second until 1646.) Some farm land had already been worn out by 1736.

By the mid-1700s, a few families had skilled artisans or mechanics, but their agricultural pursuits were always primary. First-generation farmers could expect to pass on about 150 acres (61 ha) of land to their heirs. Second-generation farmers could expect to pass on even more between their inheritances and the dividends awarded by the town. As the generations grew, third-generation farms in the early 1700s were about 100 acres (40 ha). By the end of the 1700s, farmers could only expect to inherit about 50 acres (20 ha), a plot not large enough to support a family. Though the number of men who sold off their small plots and moved elsewhere remained too small to substantially relieve the economic pressure, it did increase as time went on.

In the mid-1700s, Federal Hill was an "industrious place" with many craftsmen setting up shop.

After the first Norfolk County Courthouse was erected in 1795, Fisher Ames proposed planting trees around town. His proposal was supported by Rev. William Montague.

In 1796, a new company was charted by the General Court granting Calvin Whiting the right to deliver water from Federal Hill to houses in the High Street and Franklin Square areas. The covered spring for the water was a mile from the village, near the fork in the road that lead to the Sandy Valley and the post road to Providence. The water cost $5 a year and was transported to homes in pipes made of hollow pine logs. The flow was not sufficient to bring it into the second story of a house, or to put out a fire.

=== Declining insularity ===
Historical population
Year	Pop.
1700	700–<750 (Note: In 1711, there were 45 families living north of the Charles River.)
1736	1,200
1750	1,500–1,600
1761	<1,900
1765	1,919
1775	>2,000
1800	1,973

Dedham remained a largely autonomous and cohesive community throughout the 1700s. By the mid-1700s, the town was much the same as it had been in the late 1600s. There was an increase in the number of people moving to town from about 700 in 1700 to roughly 2,000 by 1801.

In 1728, a majority of residents, which had thirty family names between them, could trace their ancestors back to 1648. Only 13 of the 57 names on the rolls in 1688 disappeared in the next 40 years. Of the 31 new names that appeared, most were single men. By the middle of the century, most could trace their ancestors back to those who lived in town before King Phillip's War.

Leading up to 1736, and especially after, economic opportunities were growing in Dedham and the surrounding area. This brought more people into contact with those from outside Dedham's borders. More residents were also finding spouses in surrounding communities than before. Prior to 1705, only three boys from Dedham earned degrees from Harvard College. By 1737, 11 more did so.

==== Roads ====
Stagecoach service between Boston and Providence stopped in Dedham four days a week beginning in 1765. It rose to six days a week at one point, before being disrupted by the American Revolution. A road through Springfield and then New York became popular for a time, but the road through Dedham became the preferred route again by 1793 when steamboat service began from Providence to New York.

In 1717, Medfield began petitioning the colony to straighten the Hartford Road. The road, which ran through Dedham, avoided every swamp, steep hill, pond, or ledge, adding miles to the route. The General Court appointed a committee to look into the matter, and it reported back in 1797 that a new road be laid out through Sutton and Oxford. The towns along the current road petitioned to keep it, recognizing the economic importance of it. Thanks in large part to Nathaniel Ames, the existing road was maintained but Dedham was required to straighten the portion between Roxbury and Medfield.

=== Wealth ===
By 1736, the wealthiest 20% of the town included 50 men, as opposed to 20 men roughly 50 years before. In the same time period, the richest 5% of the population owned 15% of the property, as they did nearly 100 years before. The richest 10% of the population owned 25% of the property. In some nearby towns, by contrast, the top 5% owned one-third of all property and the top 10% owned more than 50%.

As the population grew, disparities in wealth became apparent and "a permanent group of dependent poor began to appear", partly because of the scarcity of land for the growing population. In Dedham, the poorest 20% owned 5% of the property in 1730. For this population, the standard of living fell from "one of near independence to one of scrabbling inadequacy" in just 40 years.

The core of this group, which rose from 5% to 10% of taxpayers over the same time period, did not own any land. Those seeking charity no longer just consisted of widows, orphans, and the disabled, but began to include adult men who could not earn enough to survive. It was during this time that records first mention "the poor". A poor house opened in 1711.

The poor became increasingly concentrated in the outlying lands where the soil was poorest. By 1750, the outer precincts contained 60% of the population but 75% of the poor. The men in the central village, who tended to come from senior lines of old families, were disproportionately likely to be in the richest 10% of taxpayers.

The wealth lost by this population was gained equally by all other classes in town. By the middle of the century an upper class was beginning to form. Even the richest men were still likely to be farmers, or perhaps merchants or innkeepers. Though the demand for food in nearby Boston was growing, farmers did not make contracts to deliver large amounts of crops. Instead, they grew enough to feed their families and a little extra to trade. Most men could expect the lifestyle that his father had, and at least 75% had the same occupation.

== Parishes, precincts, and new towns ==
As the town's population grew greater and greater, residents began moving further away from the center of town. Until 1682 all Dedhamites had lived within 1.5 miles (2.4 km) of the meetinghouse and the trend towards people moving away began slowly.

As farms and homes moved outward away from the village center, distinct and often antagonistic sections of town were already forming during the years 1725 to 1750. After the contested elections of 1704, sectional disputes intensified. Those on the outskirts would soon begin to seek independence as separately incorporated towns, causing some to worry about "the total destruction of Dedham."

New towns, beginning with Medfield in 1651 and followed by Needham in 1711, Bellingham in 1719 and Walpole in 1724, began to break off. After Walpole left, Dedham had just 25% of its original land area.

As the population spread, residents crossed borders into other towns and between 1738 and 1740 Dedham annexed about eight square miles from Dorchester and Stoughton. By the end of the 19th century, the communities of Bellingham, Dover, Franklin, Medfield, Medway, Millis, Natick, Norfolk, Needham, Norwood, Plainville, Walpole, Wellesley, Westwood, and Wrentham would be established within the original bounds of Dedham. With the division and subdivision of so many communities, Dedham has been called the "Mother of Towns."

Community	Year incorporated as a town	Notes
Needham	1711	Formerly the North Parish.
Medway	1713	Separated from Medfield. The land was granted to Dedham in 1649.
Bellingham	1719	
Walpole	1724	
Stoughton	1726	Part of the Dorchester New Grant of 1637. Separated from Dorchester.
Sharon	1775	Part of the Dorchester New Grant of 1637. Separated from Stoughton.
Foxborough	1778	Part of the Dorchester New Grant of 1637.
Franklin	1778	Separated from Wrentham.
Canton	1797	Part of the Dorchester New Grant of 1637. Separated from Stoughton.

=== Needham ===
Just 15 months after asking for their own church, 40 of the 45 men living on the north side of the Charles River suddenly asked the General Court to separate them from Dedham. Their petition cited the inadequate services provided, namely schools and churches. It was an 8-mile journey from the North Parish to the meetinghouse. The petitioners from the North Parish also said that, if they were simply to be made a precinct instead of a separate town, that they would suffer political reprisals.

Dedham agreed that the services were inadequate and did not oppose the separation, but did try to reduce the amount of land the separatists were seeking. Dedham also asked for a delay of one year. The General Court agreed with the petitioners, however, and created the new town of Needham with the original boundaries requested.

Those who remained in Dedham still held rights to the unallotted lands in Needham, however, and any decrease in taxes would be offset by a decrease in expenditures. There may have also been some satisfaction in separating themselves from those on the other side of the 1704 power struggle.

=== Walpole ===
On May 13, 1717, Town Meeting voted to allow those in outlying areas to stop paying for the central village's minister and to move the school around town seasonally. When residents of the sawmill village asked to establish their own church, however, the Town voted not to allow it on March 7, 1721. Two months later, on May 15, 1721, the same residents presented a petition asking to be set off as their own town. Town Meeting once again rejected their request.

Soon residents of the other outlying areas began joining forces with them. Finally, with the urging of the Great and General Court, the new town of Walpole was created in May 1724.

=== Clapboard Trees Parish ===
On March 6, 1722, the residents of the Clapboard Trees section of town asked Town Meeting to be set off as a parish or their own town. After the election of 1726, when those from the central village recaptured the entire board of selectmen, they went directly to the General Court asking to be set off as a new town. The Court referred it to their net session, at which time they dismissed it.

After the brawl of 1728, and the large number of petitions sent to it, the General Court sent a committee to Dedham to investigate. They refused to consider independence, but set aside Clapboard Trees, so named because of the great profit made from harvesting and milling pine trees, and South Dedham as a separate precinct. Those in the new precinct could not agree on where to build a new meetinghouse, however, and so in 1734 Clapboard Trees asked to be returned to the First Precinct. South Dedham was told to remain apart and to build their meetinghouse where they were instructed to in the first place.

In 1737, it became the Third Precinct.

== American Revolution ==
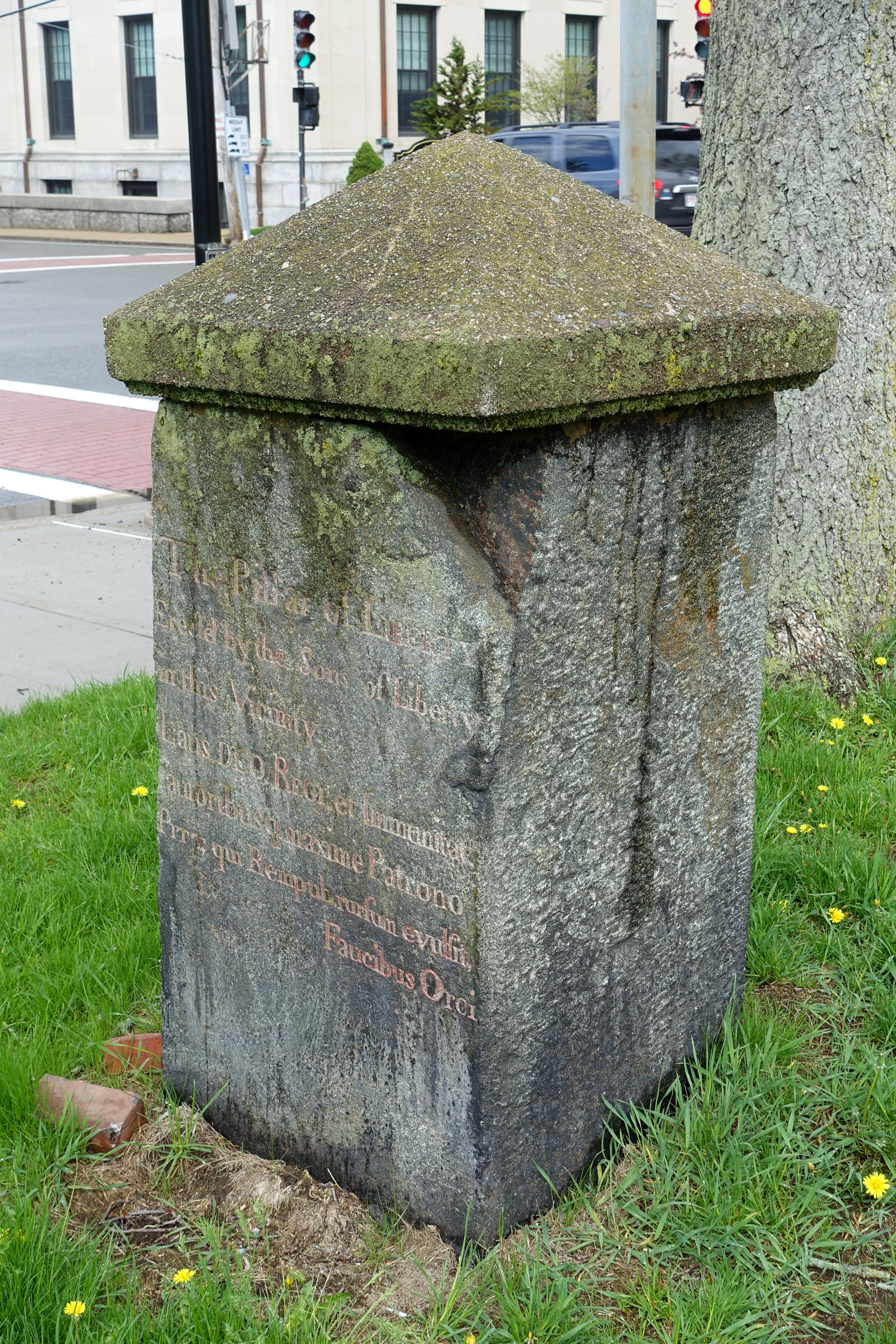
The base of the Pillar of Liberty

When Parliament imposed the Stamp Act 1765 on the 13 colonies, Town Meeting appointed a committee to draft a set of instructions to Samuel Dexter, their representative in the Great and General Court. The letter, which instructed Dexter to oppose the Act, was unanimously approved on October 21, 1765.

When the act was repealed, Nathaniel Ames and the Sons of Liberty erected the Pillar of Liberty on the church green at the Corner of High and Court streets. A "vast concourse of people" attended its erection. Seven months later, a 10' pillar was added with a bust of William Pitt the Elder. Pitt was credited, according to the inscription on the base, of having "saved America from impending slavery, and confirmed our most loyal affection to King George III by procuring a repeal of the Stamp Act."

After Parliament adopted the Townshend Acts, Town Meeting voted on November 16, 1767, to join in the boycott of imported goods: Eleven days after the Sons of Liberty dumped tea into Boston Harbor, Town Meeting gathered to "highly approve" the actions taken by the mob and to create a Committee of Correspondence to keep in touch with other communities.

At the Woodward Tavern, more than 60 delegates gathered and voted to draft a resolution that became known as the Suffolk Resolves. The resolves were then rushed by Paul Revere to the First Continental Congress. The Congress in turn adopted as a precursor to the Declaration of Independence.

On the morning of April 19, 1775, a messenger came "down the Needham road" with news about the battle in Lexington. Church bells were rung and signal guns were fired to alert the minutemen and militia of the need to gather. Captain Joseph Guild's company began leaving in small groups, as soon as enough men to form a platoon had assembled. Within an hour of the first notice, the "men of Dedham, even the old men, received their minister's blessing and went forth, in such numbers that scarce one male between sixteen and seventy was left at home."

In May 1776, Town Meeting voted that "if the Honourable Congress should, for the safety of the Colonies, declare their independence of the Kingdom of Great Britain, they, the said Inhabitants, will solemnly engage with their lives and fortunes to support them in the measure."

Several Tories, including Rev. William Clark, were either run out of town because of their political sensibilities or were arrested as traitors. The people of Dedham stoned the Anglican St. Paul's Church and then took it over for use as a military storehouse. From then on, Clark would secretly conduct services in his house.

Following the evacuation of Boston General George Washington spent the night of April 4, 1776 at Samuel Dexter's home on his way to New York.

== Norfolk County ==
By the time Norfolk County was formed in 1793, and with it Dedham as its shire town, there had been people pushing for a split of Suffolk County for a generation. One of the chief proponents of the split was Nathaniel Ames.

The "influx of lawyers, politicians, and people on county business forced the town to abandon its traditional insularity and its habitual distrust of newcomers." At the time, there was no set court dates. Anyone with business before the court or the county would simply arrive in Dedham at the start of the session and await their turn. The Taverns were busy, and residents would sit in court to hear the more oratorically inclined lawyers pontificate before the bench. Oyster vendors would even appear on the streets outside the courts during the early days of the court term. Residents were not terribly fond of lawyers, however. In 1786, they instructed Nathaniel Kingsbury, Dedham's representative in General Court, to reform the practice of law or to simply abolish the profession of lawyer all together.

=== Courthouse ===
After the creation of the county, the Court of Common Pleas and the Court of General Sessions of the Peace first met in Dedham's meetinghouse. Nathaniel Ames was chosen as the clerk of both and they met for the first time on September 23. (Note: Hanson is not clear in which year they first met.)

When the court met on January 7, 1794, it was so cold in the building, which lacked any sort of heating, that they moved to the Woodward Tavern across the street. The Anglican Church in town had also offered their building, but it was in such a state of disrepair that the offer was not accepted. The First Church and Parish in Dedham then offered a piece of land on their Little Common, and a new courthouse was ordered to be constructed. Construction was sluggish, however, and the delays frustrated Ames. His brother, Fisher, was pleased when he heard news that the new courthouse was complete.

The court was still sitting in the meetinghouse in 1794 but the courthouse was completed in 1795. It was found to be too small, however, and the ceilings were so low as to stifle people in the courtrooms. Charles Bulfinch was hired in 1795 to design a turret for the building.

=== Jail ===
Following the creation of the County, Timothy Gay (Note: Timothy Gay Jr. was the jail keeper and was indicted, but acquitted, in the escape of Jason Fairbanks.) deeded land to the county for the creation of a jail next to his tavern on Highland Street in October 1794. Construction began that year but it was not complete until 1795. It received its first prisoner in February 1795.

== Political sentiment ==
In the late 18th century, Massachusetts was a solidly Federalist state. Dedham, however, was divided between Federalists and Republicans. Federalists began wearing black cockades in their hats while the Jacobins wore red, white, and blue versions in support of the French Revolution. When men with different colors in their hats came upon each other in the street, the interactions were bitter and occasionally violent.

Fisher Ames returned home to Dedham in 1797. Upon returning, he was alarmed by the growing number of Republicans in town, led by his brother Nathaniel. In 1798 he hosted a Fourth of July party for 60 residents that was complete with patriotic songs and speeches. The attendees wrote a complimentary letter to President John Adams, pledging their support should the new nation go to war with France. Referring to the XYZ Affair, they wanted France to know that "we bear no foreign yoke--we will pay no tribute."

Nathaniel Ames wrote in his diary that his brother had convinced "a few deluded people" into signing the letter by "squeezing teazing greazing" them with food and drink. Despite his brother the Congressman's efforts, Nathaniel believed that "the Great Mass of People" in the town were with the Republicans. For his part, Fisher wrote to Secretary of State Timothy Pickering after the party that "the progress of right opinions" was winning out in Dedham over "perhaps the most malevolent spirit that exists," the Republican Party.

Fisher Ames was walking down the street one day when he saw his brother denouncing the government to a small crowd as a "hotch potch, a usurpation, a tyranny, a monster." Before walking on, Fisher defended the government. Later that evening, the situation repeated itself with Nathaniel giving an anti-government speech and Fisher retorting.

While attending a Town Meeting in Dedham, Fisher Ames rose to speak and delivered one of his "oratorical gems." A laborer rose to speak after him and said "Mr. Moderator, my brother Ames' eloquence reminds me of nothing but the shining of a firefly, which gives just enough light to show its own insignificance." He then immediately sat down.

== Dedham Liberty Pole ==
Residents awoke one October morning in 1798 to find a large wooden pole had been erected on the Hartford Road in Clapboard Trees parish. At the top was a hand painted sign declaring

No Stamp act; no sedition; no alien bill; no land tax.
Downfall to the tyrants of America; peace and
retirement to the President; long live the vice
President and the minority; May moral government
be the basis of civil government.

This liberty pole was erected by David Brown, an itinerant veteran of the American Revolution who traveled from town to town in Massachusetts, drumming up subscribers for a series of political pamphlets he had written. Brown was assisted by Benjamin Fairbanks and about 40 others. (Note: Some historians have suggested that the words were written by Nathaniel Ames.) Brown held the ladder while another, presumably Fairbanks, put up the sign. Nathaniel Ames was also very likely involved. When it appeared, Fisher Ames and the rest of Dedham's Federalist community were enraged.

Fairbanks, a prosperous farmer and former Selectman but also an "impressionable, rather excitable man," was quickly arrested and charged with violating the Sedition Act of 1798. Brown, on the other hand, eluded authorities until March 1799, when he was caught in Andover, 28 miles away.

When the trial came, Fairbanks was brought before the court first. Fairbanks, facing the "powerful forces" arrayed against him, confessed on June 8. Justice Samuel Chase sentenced Fairbanks to six hours in prison and a fine of five dollars, plus court costs of 10 shillings, the lightest sentence ever given for any of the Sedition Act defendants. (Note: Hanson has the fine as five shillings.)

On June 9, Brown also pled guilty, but he was not shown the same mercy as Fairbanks. Chase accepted the guilty plea, but insisted on trying the case anyway so that the "degree of his guilt might be duly ascertained." Chase offered Brown a chance to reduce his sentence by naming everyone involved with his "mischievous and dangerous pursuits," and the names of all those who subscribed to his pamphlets. Brown refused, saying, "I shall lose all my friends."

Brown was sentenced to 18 months in prison and a $480 fine, the harshest sentence ever imposed under the Sedition Act. As he did not have the money, and had no way of earning it while in prison, Brown petitioned President John Adams for a pardon in July 1800, and then again in February 1801. Adams refused both times, keeping Brown in prison. When Thomas Jefferson became president, one of his first acts was to issue a general pardon for any person convicted under the Sedition Act.

== Other ==
A map of what is today Dedham Square, showing the location of Ames' Tavern.

In the 1700s, Dedham was "becoming one of the largest and most influential country towns in Massachusetts." The mail road between Portsmouth, New Hampshire and Williamsburg, Virginia had run through Dedham since the end of the 1690s. Originally it ran down East Street but, around 1760 it changed to head down Court Street, Highland Street, and Federal Hill instead. The road also brought many of the province's elite to visit with Jason Haven or Samuel Dexter. An inn existed along Highland Street until 1787 when it was purchased by Captain Timothy Stowe.

In 1721, Town Meeting voted to periodically move the school from place to place around the town, relieving the burden of students who lived in outlying areas. In 1772 and 1773, there were severe measles outbreaks in Dedham. Martin Draper's house fell into the river in 1773.

The first post office was established in 1795 in Jeremiah Shuttleworth's West India Goods shop on High Street at the site of the present day Dedham Historical Society building. Mail was placed on a table in the shop, and residents would walk in and help themselves. Shuttleworth was replaced as postmaster 38 years later by Dr. Elisha Thayer.

Following a state law passed in 1794, the first official map of the town was created. It showed county roads, places of public worship, rivers, bridges, courthouses, and the distance to Boston. Drawn by Elijah Pond, (Note: Pond was possibly from Wrentham.) it was at a scale of 200 rods to the inch, and it included a "tirade that is completely unrelated to the map itself" in which the author complains about how mill owners on Mother Brook got special treatment to the detriment of other land owners.

=== Ames Tavern ===
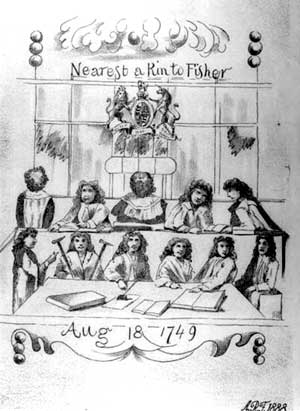
Sketch of the sign that hung outside the Ames Tavern in Dedham, Massachusetts

Nathaniel Ames moved to Dedham in 1732 and developed a reputation as the village eccentric. He also developed a reputation for being litigious, especially when it came to the tavern he inherited from his deceased son.

The tavern was founded in 1649 by Joshua Fisher and it was passed down through several generations to Ames' first wife, Mary Fisher, and then to their son, Fisher Ames, named in honor of his mother's family. (Note: This Fisher Ames had a half brother, also named Fisher Ames.) When both Mary and baby Fisher died within a year of the child's birth, the rest of the Fisher family attempted to take back the tavern.

Nathaniel Ames won, but Benjamin Gay, a brother-in-law of Mary, took physical possession of the property. When Ames took him to the Inferior Court of Judicature to evict him, Gay prevailed and the courts assessed Ames with court fees. Ames appealed to the Superior Court of Judicature, but lost again. Ames went back again to the Superior Court, this time getting a hearing before the full court and a jury. This time he won on a 5–2 vote. Gay would later go on to open his own tavern at 73 Court Street and to conduct a smear campaign against Ames. (Note: Gay's Tavern was out of business by 1810.)

Ames was incensed that he did not receive a unanimous opinion, however. He hung a sign out of front of the tavern, which was now officially his, that showed Benjamin Lynde and Paul Dudley, the two justices who voted against him, with their backs to books containing the laws of the province. When the judges heard about the sign, they dispatched the sheriff to go retrieve it so that they could see it for themselves. Word got to Ames faster than the sheriff did, however, so when the official pulled up to the tavern he found a new sign that simply stated "Matthew 12:39." Upon consulting a Bible, the sheriff read "A wicked and adulterous generation seeketh after a sign but there shall be no sign given unto it."

=== Animals ===
On May 14, 1700, Lt. Joseph Colburn (Note: Colburn lived from 1662 to 1718. He was the 11th and last child of Nathaniel Colburn. He was a town surveyor and set the boundary between Dedham and Medfield as well as between Dedham and Dorchester. He also laid out highways and cartways in town. Additionally, he was a constable and a tithingman. As such, he was responsible for maintaining moral family order.) was paid "forty shillings of the Town rate" for constructing an animal pound measuring 33' square on his land. (Note: In 1639, the land was granted to Rev. John Allin) The pound was originally made out of wood and later reconstructed with stone. After the town of Westwood broke away, the pound was included within the new town's boundaries. (Note: It is located on present day Rt. 109, near the intersection with Rt. 128.) The oak tree that grew in the middle of it was included on Westwood's town seal and on that of the Dedham-Westwood Water District.

Only a small portion of the land had been cleared in the 18th century. Wolves and other wild animals roamed freely and "made the night hideous," particularly in the area around Wigwam Pond and the surrounding woods. A 20 shilling bounty per bobcat was established in 1734, and the last person to claim it did so in 1957.

=== Guests ===
Benjamin Franklin stayed at the Ames Tavern on October 12, 1763. Thomas Jefferson ate breakfast there on June 18, 1784, as he toured the northern states before departing for Europe as an ambassador from the Congress of the Confederation. Years later, Fisher Ames would become one of his bitterest political opponents.

When Jeremiah Smith was traveling south from New Hampshire to attend Congress in 1795, he stopped to visit Fisher Ames, his colleague. Ames was too sick to attend the opening of the congressional session and would remain in Dedham until he was well enough to ride south again.

=== New Dedhamites ===
Eleven Acadians arrived in Dedham in 1758 after the British deported them from what is today Nova Scotia. Though they were Catholics, the officially Protestant town accepted them and they "were allowed harbor in town as 'French Neutrals.'" There would be no Catholic Church in Dedham for another 99 years when the first St. Mary's Church opened.

After Nathaniel Ames died in 1764, his son Nathaniel Ames attempted to take over the medical practice his father began. Several other doctors moved to town, much to the younger Ames' chagrin, but were not successful and eventually left town.

Alexander Quapish moved to Dedham from Yarmouth. He married Sarah David, a Christian indigenous woman from that community in 1767, having filed his intention to do so on October 27. When Sarah died in 1774, she was buried at the ancient Indian burial ground near Wigwam Pond. She was said to be the last person buried there. (Note: The area has since been converted into athletic fields and a commercial shopping space.) Both Sarah and Alexander were known as the "last Indian" in Dedham.

=== French and Indian War ===
Many men from Dedham fought in the French and Indian War.

Following Braddock's Defeat, Colonel George Washington passed through Dedham along East Street on his way to see Governor William Shirley to obtain a military commission. During this 1756 trip he was accompanied by a retinue of soldiers and slaves.

=== Black Bear ===
A legend first published in 1932 by William Moore tells the story of Black Bear, a descendant of King Phillip, who allegedly haunts the woods surrounding Wigwam Pond. According to the legend, Black Bear was a petty thief who one night in 1775 tried to kidnap the infant child of Sam Stone, a local farmer. Earlier in the day Stone had thwarted Black Bear's attempt to steal some horse blankets, and Black Bear took the child as revenge. When the child's cry awoke his parents, however, Stone gave chase.

Black Bear eventually dropped the child in the woods so he could run faster to his waiting canoe. When Stone arrived on shore, he shot Black Bear, who gave out a loud cry and then fell into the pond. His spirit still allegedly haunts the area, and is sometimes seen holding a child, and other times with horse blankets, but always giving off an unearthly wail. The part of the pond that never freezes, even in the coldest winters, is said to be the spot where he died.

=== Columbian Minerva ===
The Columbian Minerva newspaper was established in Dedham in 1796 by Benjamin and Nathaniel Heaton. It initially had about 200 subscribers. Nathaniel Ames considered it to be overly Federalist in its political leanings and canceled his subscription in protest in 1798. His brother, Fisher Ames, canceled his subscription five years later for being to Jacobinical.

The Heaton brothers sold the paper to Herman Mann in late 1797.

=== Powder House ===
Gunpowder had been stored in the rafters of the meetinghouse since 1653. In 1765, however, a committee was appointed to build a powder house on Aaron Fuller's land for the purpose instead. The project was not completed, however, so a new vote was taken in 1765. The powder house was eventually completed in 1767 and stands today at 162 Ames Street. It cost £13.6.4.1.

== Works cited ==
- Abbott, Katharine M. (1903). Old Paths And Legends Of New England (PDF). New York: The Knickerbocker Press. pp. 290–297.
- Bowers, Claude Gernade (1925). Jefferson and Hamilton: The Struggle for Democracy in America. Houghton Mifflin.
- Burgess, Ebenezer (1840). Dedham Pulpit: Or, Sermons by the Pastors of the First Church in Dedham in the XVIIth and XVIIIth Centuries. Perkins & Marvin.
- Clarke, Wm. Horatio (1903). Mid-Century Memories of Dedham. Dedham Historical Society.
- Dedham Historical Society (2001). Images of America:Dedham. Arcadia Publishing. ISBN 978-0-7385-0944-0.
- Fisher, Phillip A. (1898). The Fisher Genealogy: A Record of the Descendants of Joshua, Anthony, and Cornelius Fisher, of Dedham, Mass., 1630-1640. Massachusetts Publishing Company. ISBN 978-0-608-32125-7.
- Hanson, Robert Brand (1976). Dedham, Massachusetts, 1635-1890. Dedham Historical Society.
- Hurd, Duane Hamilton (1884). History of Norfolk County, Massachusetts: With Biographical Sketches of Many of Its Pioneers and Prominent Men. J. W. Lewis & Company.
- Free Public Library Commission of Massachusetts (1908). Report of the Free Public Library Commission of Massachusetts. Secretary of the Commonwealth.
- Knudsen, Harold M. (2025). Fisher Ames, Christian Founding Father & Federalist. Liberty Hill Publishing.
- Lippincott, J.B., ed. (1876). The Debates in the Several State Conventions on the Adoption of the Federal Constitution: As Recommended by the General Convention at Philadelphia, in 1787 : Together with the Journal of the Federal Convention, Luther Martin's Letter, Yates's Minutes, Congressional Opinions, Virginia and Kentucky Resolutions of '98–'99, and Other Illustrations of the Constitution. Vol. 2.
- Lockridge, Kenneth (1985). A New England Town. New York: W.W. Norton & Company. ISBN 978-0-393-95459-3.
- Mansbridge, Jane J. (1980). Beyond Adversary Democracy. New York: Basic Books.
- Massachusetts Board of Library Commissioners (1899). Report of the Free Public Library Commission of Massachusetts.
- Morris, Gouverneur (1888). The Diary and Letters of Gouverneur Morris: Minister of the United States to France... C. Scribner's Sons.
- Neiswander, Judith (2024). Mother Brook and the Mills of East Dedham. Damianos Publishing. ISBN 978-1-941573-66-2.
- Parr, James L. (2009). Dedham: Historic and Heroic Tales From Shiretown. The History Press. ISBN 978-1-59629-750-0.
- Slafter, Carlos (1905). A Record of Education: The Schools and Teachers of Dedham, Massachusetts 1644-1904. Dedham Transcript Press. "1642-3."
- Simon, James F. (March 10, 2003). What Kind of Nation: Thomas Jefferson, John Marshall, and the Epic Struggle to Create a United States. Simon and Schuster. ISBN 978-0-684-84871-6.
- Slack, Charles (2015). Liberty's First Crisis: Adams, Jefferson, and the Misfits Who Saved Free Speech. Atlantic Monthly Press. ISBN 978-0802123428.
- Smith, Frank (1936). A History of Dedham, Massachusetts. Transcript Press, Incorporated.
- Stowell, Marion Barber (1977). Early American Almanacs: the Colonial Weekday Bible. Ayer Publishing. ISBN 0-89102-063-2.
- Tise, Larry E. (1998). The American counterrevolution: a retreat from liberty, 1783-1800. Stackpole Books. p. 421. ISBN 978-0-8117-0100-6.
- Warren, Charles (1931). Jacobin and Junto: Or, Early American Politics as Viewed in the Diary of Dr. Nathaniel Ames, 1758-1822. Harvard University Press.
- Worthington, Erastus (1827). The history of Dedham: from the beginning of its settlement, in September 1635, to May 1827. Dutton and Wentworth.
- Worthington, Erastus (1869). Dedication of the Memorial Hall, in Dedham, September 29, 1868: With an Appendix. John Cox Jr.
