= Elias Haven =

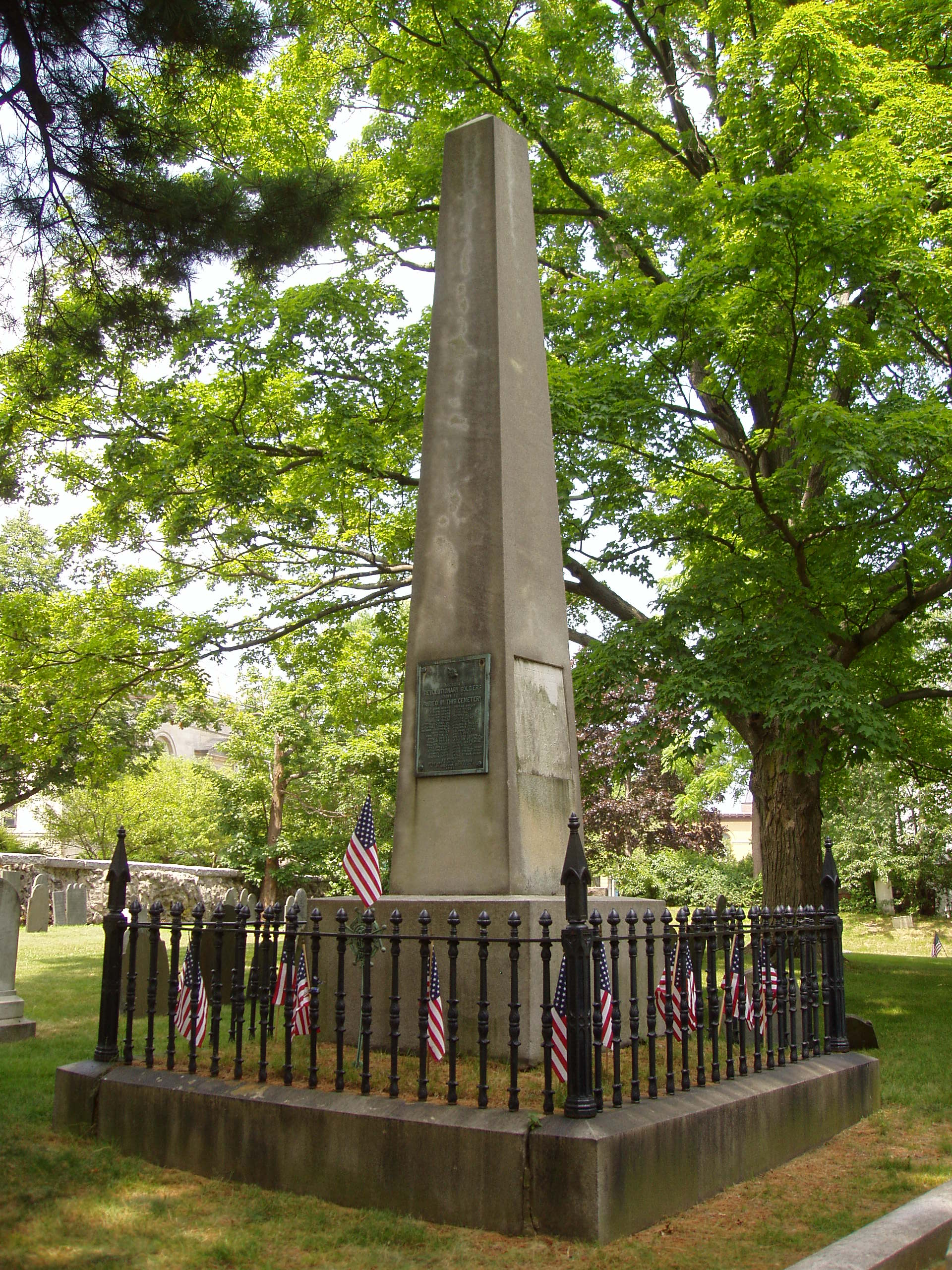
Patriots' Grave, Old Burying Ground, Arlington, Massachusetts.

Elias Haven (June 18, 1742-April 19, 1775) was a militiaman from Dedham, Massachusetts who died at the battle near the Jason Russell House in Menotomy after the battles of Lexington and Concord. He was the only man from Dedham who died on that day.

== Battle at Menotomy ==
On April 19, 1775, news of the fighting at Lexington reached Dedham via a messenger who stopped at the home of Samuel Dexter, who was so overcome he nearly fainted. Church bells rang and signal guns were fired to summon the town’s minutemen and militia. At the time, Haven was harrowing in a field on the George Ellis Chickering.

Dedham’s companies assembled quickly, and Captain Joseph Guild silenced anyone who attempted to dismiss the alarm. Within an hour, nearly every male between sixteen and seventy had departed with their minister’s blessing. A total of over 280 men left from Dedham’s four parishes, under leaders such as Captains Aaron Fuller, George Guild, William Bullard, Daniel Draper, William Ellis, and David Fairbanks. Haven marched under Ebenezer Battle's command.

Dedham’s companies joined others from surrounding towns in an ambush near the Jason Russell House in Menotomy. There, a British flanking maneuver drove the colonists back, killing ten, including Haven. Fighting next to him next to the Arlington Meeting House at the time he was shot was his brother-in-law, Aaron Whiting.

He was buried with the others who fell that day in Patriots' Grave at the Old Burying Ground.

== Personal life ==
Haven was born in Hopkinton on June 18, 1742 to Joseph Haven, a deacon in Dover, and his wife, Miriam (née Bayley). He moved to Dedham, and settled on Farm Street. On June 14, 1764, he married Jemima Whiting. (Note: Jemima was the daughter of Jonathan and Anna (née Bullard) Whiting.) Together they had three children: Elias, Abigail, and Jemima. (Note: Elias later moved to New York and one of his daughters married a Bacon.)

He worked as a cordwainer as well as husbandman.

Haven was a first cousin, once removed, of Jason Haven.

== Works cited ==
- Adams, Josiah (1843). The Genealogy of the Descendants of Richard Haven: Of Lynn, Massachusetts, who Emigrated from England about Two Hundred Years Ago; Among Whom Through His Sons John, Nathaniel, and Moses, of Framingham, are All the Graduates of that Name at Cambridge, Dartmouth, Providence, and Amherst. W. White & H. P. Lewis.
- Hanson, Robert Brand (1976). Dedham, Massachusetts, 1635-1890. Dedham Historical Society.
- Smith, Frank (1909). Biographical Sketch of the Residents of that Part of Dedham, which is Now Dover, who Took Part in King Phillip's War, the Last French and Indian War, and the Revolution: Together with the Record of the Services of Those who Represented Dover in the War of 1812, the War with Mexico, the Civil War, and the War with Spain.
- Worthington, Erastus (1869). Dedication of the Memorial Hall, in Dedham, September 29, 1868: With an Appendix. John Cox Jr.
