= Norfolk County Jail =

Norfolk County Jail could mean

- Norfolk County Jail (1795), built in 1795
- Norfolk County Jail (1817), built in 1817
- Norfolk County Correctional Center, built in 1992
