= Powder House (Dedham, Massachusetts) =

Coordinates: 42°15′12″N 71°10′37″W

The Powder House is an historic powder tower at 162 Ames Street in Dedham, Massachusetts. It stands on land owned by the Dedham Museum and Archive, but the Town of Dedham owns the structure itself.

== Early years ==
Gunpowder had been stored in the rafters of the meetinghouse since 1653.

On March 1, 1762, the Town voted to refer the further consideration of a powder house to the next May meeting. At this meeting, it was voted to have the Powder House "builded on a great Rock in Aaron Fuller's's land near Charles River," but the work was not done by the Committee then appointed. It was not until the May meeting in 1765 that it was decided to erect a building eight feet square on the outside and six feet high inside.

Construction began on June 7, 1766 and was eventually completed in 1767 at a cost of £13.6.4.1. It was built by Captain David Fuller, Deacon Nathaniel Kingsbury, and others. Measuring 8 feet square on the outside and six high on the inside with a concave hipped slate roof, it was built of brick and lime mortar.

== Later years ==
By the 1840s, it was no longer considered necessary and the use was discontinued. By the 250th anniversary of the Town in 1886, it was said that "so thoroughly is Powder House Rock identified with the social life of this community that it has come to be regarded as almost a sacred spot dear to the present dwellers in the village and to the sons and daughters of Dedham scattered throughout the land." On the occasion of the 250th anniversary, the building was restored to as close to its original condition as was possible and a bronze tablet was inserted onto its side.

In the mid-1800s, a group of boys pried open the doors of the powder house one winter day. They found kegs of stiff white card cartridges filled with damn powder and heavy bullets. There were also kegs filled with flints used in flintlock muskets.

The boys took the cartridges down to the meadows where fires burned for the benefit of the ice skaters nearby. The damp powder hissed and sizzled when thrown into the fires, and the bullets were melted down.

A proposal was made by Louis Bullard to turn the powder house into a memorial of prominent Dedhamites, with their names carved into the building. Nothing came of it.

On April 27, 2019, a cleanup was held to help restore public access to the powder house.

== Works cited ==
- Clarke, Wm. Horatio (1903). Mid-Century Memories of Dedham. Dedham Historical Society.
- Hanson, Robert Brand (1976). Dedham, Massachusetts, 1635-1890. Dedham Historical Society.
