= Josiah Dwight =

Former minister of a church in Massachusetts, US

Josiah Dwight (born 1671) was the minister of the West Parish Church of Dedham, Massachusetts, today Westwood's First Parish, from June 4, 1735, until November 1742.

== Personal life ==
Dwight was born in Dedham on February 8, 1671 to Timothy and Anna Dwight. He was the first of the Dwight family to graduate from Harvard College in 1687, but dozens of family members, his son, would in the years to come. He earned a second degree in 1720.

He was the brother of Justice Nathaniel Dwight, Captain Henry Dwight, and Michael Dwight. On December 4, 1695, he married Mary Partridge. They had 13 children. His brother, Nathaniel, married Mary's sister, Mehitible.

== Church at Woodstock ==
Dwight was the first minister in Woodstock, Connecticut. (Note: He was succeeded in Woodstick by Amos Throop.) He served there from 1686 to 1726. The church was new and the people were not wealthy. He salary was small, 60 pounds, and often was paid late.

Dwight was paid his salary partly in land which he cultivated and thus gave offence to some of his parish. He was sometimes hasty in speech and did not always refrain from using sharp words and a gradual feeling of opposition to him was developed. He was voted more salary in 1730 and it was hinted to him that he should give more time to his parish. Some years of bitter contention followed and then he asked to be dismissed. At a town meeting in 1726, he acknowledged his faults and promised to amend them but the town voted sixty to one, with one neutral vote, to dismiss him in September 1726 after a pastorate of more than 36 years. He then went to live in Thompson, Connecticut. The neighboring churches, believing he had not been justly dealt with, took up his cause and called a council. None of the charges against him were proven. He admitted rashness of speech and want of meekness in some cases but this seems to have been the extent of his errors.

He already had a full ministerial career when, at the age of 64, he returned to his hometown.

== Founding of Clapboardtrees Church ==
During the early 1700s some residents of outlying parts of town were not pleased with the First Church and Parish in Dedham, and made it a habit to give the new minister, Samuel Dexter, a hard time. When a number of them walked out of the church, it took an entire Council of Churches to get them to return in July 1725. Even after they were received back into the fold, animosities remained between Dexter and some of the more vocal dissidents. In 1727, though residents from outlying areas tried to pack the town meeting, they failed in votes to move the meeting house or to hire two ministers at the Town's expense. Similar motions were rejected multiple times throughout 1728.

The Clapboard Trees section of town had more liberal religious views than did those in either the original village or South Dedham. After a deadlocked Town Meeting could not resolve the squabbling between the various parts of town, the General Court first put them in the second precinct with South Dedham, and then in the first precinct with the village.

This did not satisfy many of them, however, and in 1735 they hired Dwight along with some like minded residents of the village. First Church, however, refused to release any of its members to form a new church. Undeterred, those who broke away called a Council of Churches from the surrounding towns and had their action ratified. He was ordained June 1735 and was the first to ascribe his name to the church covenant.

Creating a new church was an act of dubious legality and the General Court once again stepped in, this time to grant them status as the third precinct and, with it, the right to establish their own church in 1736. The General Court also allowed more liberal minded members of conservative churches to attend the more liberal churches in town, and to apply their taxes to pay for them.

Dwight was dismissed on account of dissensions between him and the parish in November 1742. (Note: He was succeeded in Dedham by Andrew Tyler.)

== Later years ==
After leaving the Clapboard Trees at the age of 72, Dwight returned to Thompson where he died in 1748. His son-in-law, Rev. Marston Cabot, was the minister in Thompson and Dwight stayed in his house.

== Works cited ==
- Hanson, Robert Brand (1976). Dedham, Massachusetts, 1635-1890. Dedham Historical Society.
- Burgess, Ebenezer (1840). Dedham Pulpit: Or, Sermons by the Pastors of the First Church in Dedham in the XVIIth and XVIIIth Centuries. Perkins & Marvin.
- Lockridge, Kenneth (1985). A New England Town. New York: W.W. Norton & Company. ISBN 978-0-393-95459-3.
- Tyler, Edward Royall; Kingsley, William Lathrop; Fisher, George Park; Dwight, Timothy (1876). New Englander and Yale Review. W.L. Kingsley.
- Cooke, George Willis (1887). A History of the Clapboard Trees Or Third Parish, Dedham, Mass: Now the Unitarian Parish, West Dedham, 1736-1886. G.H. Ellis.
- Dwight, Benjamin Woodbridge (1874). The History of the Descendants of John Dwight of Dedham, Mass. J.F. Trow & Son, printers. ISBN 9781981482658.
