= Abner Ellis =

American politician

Col. Abner Ellis (January 4, 1770 - December 14, 1844) represented Dedham, Massachusetts in the Great and General Court for five years. Ellis was the son of Abner and Meletiah Ellis and was born on January 4, 1770.

He was also town clerk and selectman in 1780. In 1792–3, Ellis was teaching in one of the Dedham Public Schools. He was a charter member of the Society in Dedham for Apprehending Horse Thieves.

Ellis was married to Mary Gay by Thomas Thatcher on December 18, 1793. He died on December 14, 1844 and is buried in the Old Village Cemetery.

Among Ellis's descendants was great-great-grandson Charles G. Sawtelle, who served as Quartermaster General of the United States Army from 1896 to 1897.

== Works cited ==
- Worthington, Erastus (1827). The history of Dedham: from the beginning of its settlement, in September 1635, to May 1827. Dutton and Wentworth.
