= Joseph Ellis (disambiguation) =

Joseph Ellis (born 1943) is an American historian.

Joseph or Joe Ellis may also refer to:

- Joe Ellis (born 1958), American football executive and president of the Denver Broncos
- Joe Ellis (basketball) (born 1944), American basketball player
- Joseph Ellis, stage name Zeph Ellis (born 1988), British rapper and producer
- Joseph Ellis (politician), representative to the Great and General Court of Massachusetts
- Joseph Ellis Jr., representative to the Great and General Court of Massachusetts
- Joseph Ellis (hammer thrower)

== See also ==
- Joey Ellis (disambiguation)
