= Thomas Fuller (disambiguation) =

Thomas Fuller (1608–1661) was an English religious leader and historian.

Thomas Fuller may also refer to:

- Thomas Fuller (architect) (1823–1898), Canadian architect
- Thomas Fuller (bishop) (1810–1884), Anglican bishop in Canada
- Thomas Fuller (mental calculator) (1710–1790), enslaved African renowned for his mathematical abilities
- Thomas Fuller (Massachusetts politician) (1662–1733), representative to the Great and General Court
- Thomas Fuller (writer) (1654–1734), British writer, physician and religious leader
- Thomas Charles Fuller (1832–1901), American judge
- Thomas Ekins Fuller (1831–1910), MP and newspaper editor of the Cape Colony
- Thomas G. Fuller (1909–1994), Canadian naval officer
- Thomas Horace Fuller (c. 1816–1861), lawyer and political figure in Nova Scotia
- Thomas J. D. Fuller (1808–1876), American politician
- Thomas O. Fuller (1867–1942), American Baptist minister, educator and member of the North Carolina Senate
- Thomas W. Fuller (1865–1951), Canadian architect
