= Timothy Gay Jr. =

American politician

Timothy Gay Jr. represented Dedham, Massachusetts, in the Great and General Court.

He was also the Norfolk County jailkeeper when Jason Fairbanks escaped. He was acquitted of any wrongdoing, but was turned out of office.

== Works cited ==
- Hanson, Robert Brand (1976). Dedham, Massachusetts, 1635-1890. Dedham Historical Society.
- Worthington, Erastus (1827). The history of Dedham: from the beginning of its settlement, in September 1635, to May 1827. Dutton and Wentworth.
