= Nathaniel Kingsbury =

American politician

Nathaniel Kingsbury represented Dedham, Massachusetts in the Great and General Court. He was also town clerk in 1783 and served five terms as selectman, beginning in 1773.

He helped to build the Powder House.

== Works cited ==
- Worthington, Erastus (1827). The history of Dedham: from the beginning of its settlement, in September 1635, to May 1827. Dutton and Wentworth.
