= Norfolk County Jail (1817) =

Jail in Dedham, Massachusetts

The Norfolk County Jail was a jail located on Village Avenue in Dedham, Massachusetts. It replaced the first Norfolk County Jail on nearby Highland Street. Today, the building is a condominium complex.

== Notable inmates ==
Notable inmates included

- Jason Fairbanks
- Sacco and Vanzetti. Sacco's seven-year-old son, Dante, would sometimes stand on the sidewalk outside the jail and play catch with his father by throwing a ball over the wall.
- Ezra Heywood. Heywood became friendly with Sheriff Rufus Corbin Wood who said to him: "If I could have my way, I would open the prison doors and say, 'Go and sin no more!'"

== Building ==
The two-story stone building was built in 1817 and was 33' square. Part of the jail was torn down in 1851 to erect a central, octagonal portion and two wings. It resulted in a building with the shape of a Latin cross, and featured Gothic Revival windows. The three tiers of cells radiated out like spokes from the central guardroom. After it was built, the tools used were auctioned off at Marsh's Tavern.

Ezra Heywood said that "When I stepped over the threshold of Dedham Jail, I stepped from the civilization of the nineteenth century into the barbarism of the tenth century." Two of his fellow inmates were 18-year-old men who were sentenced to five years each for stealing $26 worth of hens.

Inmates were housed in the jail until 1992 when the Norfolk County Correctional Center was opened in 1992. A court forced the closure after 13 inmates escaped in 1989. There were at least 27 break outs during the prison's history.

== Hangings ==
There were two hangings in the central rotunda. First was George C. Hersey on August 8, 1862. Over 300 people received tickets to watch. James H. Costley was hanged on June 25, 1875. Again, 300 people watched as his body twitched and convulsed for close to two minutes. One spectator fainted, and others obtained pieces of the hangman's rope to bring home as souvenirs. It was the last execution in Norfolk County.

== Condominiums ==
In 1999, the jail was converted by the Brookline-based Parencorps into a condominium complex known as Stoneleigh. The sale price was more than $1 million. The 24 luxury condominiums were offered for between $450,000 and $650,000, each with between 1,800 and 2,500 sq ft (170 and 230 m^{2}).

== Works cited ==
- Dedham Historical Society (2001). Dedham. Arcadia Publishing. ISBN 978-0-7385-0944-0.
- Parr, James L. (1 October 2009). Dedham: Historic and Heroic Tales from Shiretown. Arcadia Publishing Incorporated. ISBN 978-1-62584-277-0.
- Austin, Walter (1912). Tale of a Dedham Tavern: History of the Norfolk Hotel, Dedham, Massachusetts. Priv. print. at the Riverside Press.

42.2483°N 71.1794°W
