= Nathaniel Sumner =

American politician

Nathaniel Sumner (April 10, 1720-December 23, 1802) represented Dedham, Massachusetts in the Great and General Court.

== Personal life ==
Sumner was born in Roxbury on April 10, 1720. He was graduated from Harvard College in 1739. On September 5, 1743, he married Hannah Ballard of Walpole in Dedham. They had seven children: George, Hannah, Mary, Ebenezer, Nathiel, and William.

The family lived in the South Parish, in what is today Norwood. He was a captain in the militia and a deacon in the South Church. He died on December 23, 1802.

== Political career ==
Sumner served in the Great and General Court in 1756, 1757, 1762, 1769, and 1770. He served 19 terms as selectman in Dedham, beginning in 1753.

In 1768, Sumner and Richard Woodward were Dedham's delegates to the Massachusetts Convention of Towns, an extralegal assembly held in Boston in response to the news that British troops would soon be arriving to crack down on anti-British rioting. The pair were also among Dedham's delegates to the convention that adopted the Suffolk Resolves.

== Works cited ==
- Mann, Herman (1847). Historical Annals of Dedham: From Its Settlement in 1635 to 1847. H. Mann.
- Rudd, Edward Huntting (1908). Dedham's Ancient Landmarks and Their National Significance. Dedham Transcript Printing and Publishing Company.
- Worthington, Erastus (1827). The History of Dedham: From the Beginning of Its Settlement, in September 1635, to May 1827. Dutton and Wentworth. p. 1.
