= Isaac Bullard (politician) =

American politician (1774-1808)

Isaac Bullard (July 10, 1774 – June 18, 1808) represented Dedham, Massachusetts in the Great and General Court. He was also town clerk for a total of three years, having first been elected in 1784. He was also elected five times as selectman, beginning in 1773. Bullard was the first treasurer of Norfolk County, serving from 1793 to 1808.

Bullard was born July 10, 1774. He was a deacon of the First Church and Parish in Dedham. In this capacity, he leased out plots of the church's land for 999 year leases. His ancestor was William Bullard. He died June 18, 1808.

== Works cited ==
- Austin, Walter (1912). Tale of a Dedham Tavern: History of the Norfolk Hotel, Dedham, Massachusetts. Priv. print. at the Riverside Press.
- Hanson, Robert Brand (1976). Dedham, Massachusetts, 1635-1890. Dedham Historical Society.
- Worthington, Erastus (1827). The history of Dedham: from the beginning of its settlement, in September 1635, to May 1827. Dutton and Wentworth.
- Hurd, Duane Hamilton (1884). History of Norfolk County, Massachusetts: With Biographical Sketches of Many of Its Pioneers and Prominent Men. J. W. Lewis & Company. p. 92.
