= Peter Thacher =

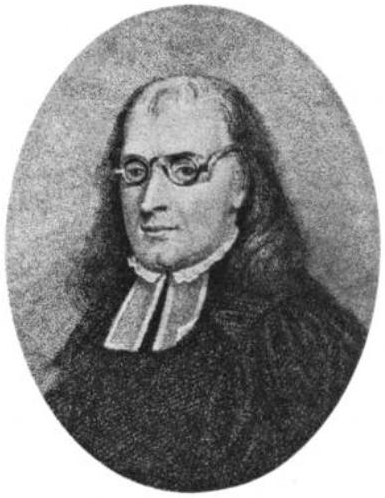
- Born: Peter Oxenbridge Thacher; March 21, 1752; Milton, Massachusetts
- Died: December 16, 1802 (aged 50); Savannah, Georgia
- Education: Harvard College
- Occupation: Clergyman
- Spouse: Elizabeth Hawkes (m. 1770)
- Children: 10

Peter Oxenbridge Thacher (1752–1802) was a Congregationalist minister in Massachusetts.

== Biography ==
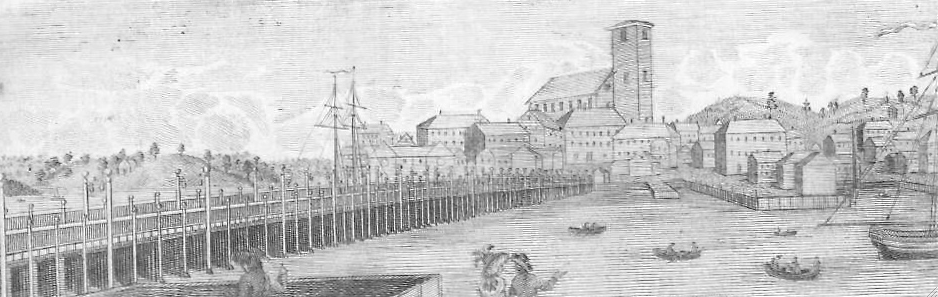
View of Brattle Street Church and West End, Boston, looking from Cambridge, 1789

Peter Thacher was born in Milton, Massachusetts on March 21, 1752. His brother was Thomas Thatcher.

He served as pastor in Malden of the First Church (1770–1784) and in Boston of the Brattle Street Church (1785–1802). He actively supported the American Revolution. (Note: For example as a young man in 1772 he "went to the Old South meeting & heard Mr. Warren pronounce an oration in commemoration of the massacre perpetrated this day 2 years ago.") For about two months, from February 4 to April 1, 1778, he served as a chaplain in a Massachusetts regiment in Rhode Island.

He participated in the drafting of the Massachusetts Constitution in 1780. In 1794, he was elected a Fellow of the American Academy of Arts and Sciences. He belonged to the Massachusetts Historical Society and Massachusetts Humane Society. He was educated at Harvard College, 1765–1769. On October 8, 1770, he married Elizabeth Poole (Hawkes); they had ten children.

Peter Thacher died in Savannah, Georgia on December 16, 1802.
