= Maritana (ship) =

The Maritana was a ship that sank on November 3, 1861 off the coast of Massachusetts, United States. It has been called "Boston Harbor's worst shipwreck." The 991-ton full-rigged ship was lost on the Shag Rocks in Broad Sound off the coast of Massachusetts at 42°19′47″N 70°52′54″W.

A monument to the captain, G.W. Williams, and those who were lost was placed at Old Village Cemetery in Dedham, Massachusetts.
