= John Metcalf (Massachusetts politician) =

American politician

John Metcalf represented Dedham, Massachusetts in the Great and General Court. He was also town clerk for a total of 16 years, having first been elected in 1731. Starting in 1716, he served 27 terms as selectman.

== Works cited ==
- Worthington, Erastus (1827). The history of Dedham: from the beginning of its settlement, in September 1635, to May 1827. Dutton and Wentworth. p. 29.
