= Joey Ellis =

Joey Ellis may refer to:

- Joey Foster Ellis (born 1984), American functional artist and craftsman
- Joey Ellis (Benidorm), a fictional character of Benidorm

== See also ==
- Joseph Ellis (disambiguation)
