= Jonathan Metcalf =

American politician

Jonathan Metcalf represented Dedham, Massachusetts in the Great and General Court. He was also town clerk and selectman in 1755.

== Works cited ==
- Worthington, Erastus (1827). The History of Dedham: From the Beginning of Its Settlement, in September 1635, to May 1827. Dutton and Wentworth. p. 1.
