= William Bullard (Dedham) =

New England settler (1594-1686)

William Bullard (1594–December 23, 1686) was an early resident and two term Selectman in Dedham, Massachusetts. He built the first bridge across the Charles River in Dedham at the site of the present day Ames Street Bridge. He also served in the trainband led by Eleazer Lusher.

Bullard was born in England in 1594 and first settled in Watertown in 1635 before moving to Dedham. He signed the Dedham Covenant, which was used to govern the Dedham settlement. He moved for a time to Cambridge, Massachusetts.

He was an ancestor of Isaac Bullard. He died December 23, 1686, at the home of his daughter.

== Works cited ==
- Worthington, Erastus (1827). The history of Dedham: from the beginning of its settlement, in September 1635, to May 1827. Dutton and Wentworth.
- Hurd, Duane Hamilton (1884). History of Norfolk County, Massachusetts: With Biographical Sketches of Many of Its Pioneers and Prominent Men. J. W. Lewis & Company. p. 92.
