= Eliphalet Pond =

American politician (1704-1795)

Eliphalet Pond (1704-1795) represented Dedham, Massachusetts in the Great and General Court.

== Personal life ==
Pond was born in Dedham in 1704. He served as an officer in the militia. Pond married Elizabeth Ellis is 1727 and worked as a farmer. He also bought and sold land. He had a son Eliphalet Pond, Jr. (Note: The younger Pond, born in 1745, was Registrar of Deeds in Norfolk County, Massachusetts from the establishment of the county in 1793 to his death in 1813. He kept the records in one of the "lower rooms" in his house at 963 Washington Street in Dedham and nailed a "Register of Deeds" sign to the tree in front. The younger Pond also served as the Dedham, Massachusetts town clerk for 25 years and as a selectman for 1813. He also served as a colonel in the American Revolution.)

== Political life ==
He represented Dedham in the Massachusetts House of Representatives in 1761 and 1763. He was also town clerk for a total of 12 years, from 1747 to 1754, and in 1757, 1758, 1763. He served as selectman from 1744 to 1754 and in 1757, 1758, and 1763. He was also the Town Meeting moderator in 1756, 1761, 1762, and 1763. He opposed the call of Jason Haven to minister at the First Church and Parish in Dedham, and for years on end requested to transfer to the third precinct church.

In May 1774, Pond signed a letter with several other addressed to Governor Thomas Hutchinson that was, in the opinion of many in Dedham, too effusive in praise given the actions the British crown had recently taken on the colonies. A group confronted him the day after the Powder Alarm. What happened next is unclear. According to Pond's own account, he spoke calmly with the group and they were satisfied that he was a patriot. In others, he and his black servant, Jack, had to hold off a mob by pointing muskets out the second story window.

== Legacy ==
Land he owned was eventually sold to Hannah B. Chickering, who established the Temporary Asylum for Discharged Female Prisoners on it. Today, the land has a housing development and the Baby Cemetery.

== Works cited ==
- Hanson, Robert Brand (1976). Dedham, Massachusetts, 1635-1890. Dedham Historical Society.
- Worthington, Erastus (1827). The History of Dedham: From the Beginning of Its Settlement, in September 1635, to May 1827. Dutton and Wentworth.
