= Joseph Richards (politician) =

American politician

Dr. Joseph Richards represented Dedham, Massachusetts in the Great and General Court. Beginning in 1731, he served five terms as selectman.

He married the daughter of Rev. Joseph Belcher but did not get along with Belcher's successor, Samuel Dexter. He was one of the richest men in Dedham and a Lt. Colonel in the Suffolk Regiment. Richards was graduated from Harvard College in 1721.

== Works cited ==
- Worthington, Erastus (1827). The History of Dedham: From the Beginning of Its Settlement, in September 1635, to May 1827. Dutton and Wentworth.
- Hanson, Robert Brand (1976). Dedham, Massachusetts, 1635-1890. Dedham Historical Society.
