= Jason Haven =

Jason Haven (March 2, 1733 – May 17, 1803) was the longest serving minister of the First Church and Parish in Dedham.

== Personal life ==
Haven was born on March 2, 1733, in Framingham, Massachusetts. He was graduated from Harvard College in 1754. While at Harvard, he was a classmate of John Hancock and one year ahead of John Adams. Following a fever in 1774, for which a day of fasting and prayer was called, he remain "an invalid" for the rest of his life.

He married the oldest daughter, Catherine, of his predecessor in the Dedham Church, Samuel Dexter. He also had a son, Samuel. Two of his children died in infancy, one at one month old and the other at seven months old. His corn barn collapsed in the late 1700s. Haven died, May 17, 1803. The family lived in the Dexter's home. His first cousin, once removed, was Elias Haven.

Haven Street in Dedham was named for him.

== Political activity ==
He was a member of the Massachusetts Constitutional Convention of 1779–1780 and a supporter of the American Revolution. He believed it granted Americans "civil and religious privileges, equal, or perhaps superior to those enjoyed in any part of the world."

Haven had dinner with Governor Thomas Hutchinson in December 1771. He had dinner with John Hancock at the home of his neighbor and brother-in-law, Samuel Dexter, in July 1773. His political influence waned as his health and mental capacity grew weaker with old age.

== Ministry ==
Haven was called to the Dedham church in 1755 and ordained on February 5, 1756. Prior to this, he was serving as interim pastor in Wrentham, Massachusetts. The church voted 40–6 to call him and the town voted 56–10 to ratify that decision. He held the pulpit until his death on May 17, 1803.

As part of the call, he was offered £133.06s.08d in addition to an annual salary of £66.13s.8d plus 20 cords of wood. He was also granted "the use and improvement" of a plot of land near the meetinghouse and given three parcels of land in Medfield, Massachusetts. In 1795, he was granted a £20 raise.

There was some opposition to his call but, after 40 years of ministry, he counted those early opponents as friends. Haven made great efforts to win them over. One of those who was never satisfied was Eliphalet Pond. He also frequently feuded with his next door neighbor, Nathaniel Ames, and his son of the same name, Nathaniel Ames.

As minister, he brought a number of young men into his household to prepare for college or the ministry; 14 of them went to Harvard College. He also oversaw the construction of the current meetinghouse in 1762. A gifted orator, he was frequently called upon to preach at ordinations and to address public assemblies. He addressed the Ancient and Honorable Artillery Company at the election of their officers in 1761 and preached a sermon before the Great and General Court in 1769. He preached the general election sermon in 1766 and the Dudleian lecture in 1789. In 1794, he preached the convention sermon.

In 1793, he instituted a new method for bringing new members into the congregation. The minister would propose an individual and, if there was no objection after 14 days, they became a member of the church. On the occasion of his 40th anniversary of ordination, he gave a rambling sermon glossed over most of the important events of the previous four decades.

Haven had been called to minister at Old North Church, but the people of Dedham convinced him to stay. He was also considered for the presidency of Yale College on account of his orthodox theology and for "Neatness dignity and purity of Style [which] surpass those of all that have been mentioned," but was passed over do to his "very Valetudinary and infirm State of Health."

Shortly before he died, Haven wrote a final message to his congregation. It was delivered from the pulpit after his death by the Rev. Mr. Prentiss of Medfield. In it, Haven entreated his flock

as far as possible, to keep the unity of the spirit in the bond of peace; that you may know how good and pleasant it is, for brethren to live together in love and harmony. Let this be your care, particularly, in your endeavors to obtain an able and faithful minister of the New Testament, to take the pastoral charge of you. Let there be no strife and contention in the important affair of settling a minister of the gospel of peace.

There was not peace in selecting his replacement, however. The church split in two, with the more liberal members breaking away to form the Allin Congregational Church. The split resulted in a seminal court case, Baker v. Fales.

=== New covenant ===
In 1793, the church adopted a new, more general, covenant:

We profess our belief in the Christian Religion. We unite ourselves together for the purpose of obeying the precepts and honoring the institutions of the religion which we profess. We covenant and agree with each other to live together as a band of Christian brethren; to give and receive counsel and reproof with meekness and candor; to submit with a Christian temper to the discipline which the Gospel authorizes the church to administer; and diligently to seek after the will of God, and carefully endeavor to obey all His commandments.

The new covenant allowed anyone who declared himself to be a Christian to be admitted as a member.

=== Teaching against fornication ===
Prior to Haven, the church had very infrequently enforced a provision requiring anyone who had sex with another before marriage to confess the sin before the entire congregation. (Note: The first records of such confessions took place during the pastorate of Samuel Dexter, and they were rare.) Such confessions increased dramatically during Haven's term. During his first 25 years there were 25 such confessions, of which 14 came during the years 1771 to 1781.

In 1781, he preached a sermon condemning fornication and the then-common practice of women sleeping with men who professed their intention to marry. The sermon was so long and memorable that decades later, in 1827, congregants still remembered the ashamed looks on the faces of those gathered and how uncomfortable many were.

== Works cited ==
- Worthington, Erastus (1827). The history of Dedham: from the beginning of its settlement, in September 1635, to May 1827. Dutton and Wentworth.
- Smith, Frank (1936). A History of Dedham, Massachusetts. Transcript Press, Incorporated.
- Allen, William (1832). An American biographical and historical dictionary...: containing an account of the lives, characters, and writings of the most eminent persons in North America from its first settlement, and a summary of the history of the several colonies and of the United States. W. Hyde.
- Hanson, Robert Brand (1976). Dedham, Massachusetts, 1635-1890. Dedham Historical Society.
- Burgess, Ebenezer (1840). Dedham Pulpit: Or, Sermons by the Pastors of the First Church in Dedham in the XVIIth and XVIIIth Centuries. Perkins & Marvin.
