= Thomas Thatcher =

Clergy from Dedham, Massachusetts (1756–1812)

Thomas Thatcher (1756 – October 19, 1812) was the third minister of the West Church of Dedham, Massachusetts.

== Personal life ==
Thatcher was born in Boston in 1756 and was graduated from Harvard College in 1775. Thatcher never married. His father was Oxenbridge Thatcher and he had a brother, Peter.

Thatcher was a member of the American Academy of Arts and Sciences. He was, along with Fisher Ames, a delegate to the convention that ratified the United States Constitution.

== Ministry ==
He served in the West Church from June 7, 1780, to his death on October 19, 1812. He donated money and land to the church. He was a Democratic-Republican and often preached this political philosophy to his congregation. During his pastorate, the meetinghouse was pulled down and a new one was erected.

Thatcher was frequently asked to give guest sermons in other churches, including one on Christmas Day in Dedham's Anglican church, of which 20 were published.

In 1800, Colburn Gay of Dedham wished to marry Sarah Ellis of Walpole. The laws at the time said that a wedding must take place in the town of the bride, however Gay insisted that Thatcher preside. Thatcher was the minister in Dedham's third parish, however, and could not officiate outside of the town's borders. To resolve this dilemma the couple stood on the Walpole side of Bubbling Brook, and Thatcher stood on the Dedham side. They were married across the stream and had two children before Sarah died in 1810.

After Jason Fairbanks was hung for murdering his girlfriend in front of a crowd of 10,000, Thatcher published a sermon in which he wondered if Fairbanks' hanging and the "riot and confusion" at the end of the day were caused by a hellish legion "of obstreperous, incarnate fiends, who paraded the streets of this peaceful village."

== Legacy ==
A street in Westwood, Massachusetts is named for him.

== Works cited ==
- Burgess, Ebenezer (1840). Dedham Pulpit: Or, Sermons by the Pastors of the First Church in Dedham in the XVIIth and XVIIIth Centuries. Perkins & Marvin.
- Hanson, Robert Brand (1976). Dedham, Massachusetts, 1635–1890. Dedham Historical Society.
- Lippincott, J.B., ed. (1876). The Debates in the Several State Conventions on the Adoption of the Federal Constitution: As Recommended by the General Convention at Philadelphia, in 1787 : Together with the Journal of the Federal Convention, Luther Martin's Letter, Yates's Minutes, Congressional Opinions, Virginia and Kentucky Resolutions of '98–'99, and Other Illustrations of the Constitution. Vol. 2.
