= John Fuller (Massachusetts politician) =

American politician

John Fuller represented Dedham, Massachusetts in the Great and General Court. He was also town clerk for a total of four years, having first been elected in 1690. Also beginning in 1690, he began the first of his five terms as selectman.

== Works cited ==
- Worthington, Erastus (1827). The history of Dedham: from the beginning of its settlement, in September 1635, to May 1827. Dutton and Wentworth.
