= Eleazer Ellis =

American politician

Eleazer Ellis was an American politician who represented Dedham, Massachusetts in the Great and General Court. Beginning in 1729, he served two terms as selectman.

== Works cited ==
- Worthington, Erastus (1827). The History of Dedham: From the Beginning of Its Settlement, in September 1635, to May 1827. Dutton and Wentworth. p. 1.
