= Joseph Belcher =

- Minister of the First Church and Parish in Dedham
- Installed: November 29, 1693
- Term ended: April 27, 1723
- Predecessor: William Adams
- Successor: Samuel Dexter

Personal details
- Born: May 14, 1669 Milton, Massachusetts Bay Colony
- Died: April 27, 1723 (aged 53) Roxbury, Province of Massachusetts Bay
- Spouse: Abigail Thompson
- Children: 6
- Profession: Puritan minister
- Education: Harvard College (1690)

Joseph Belcher (May 14, 1669 – April 27, 1723) was a minister at the First Church in Dedham, Massachusetts.

== Personal life ==
Belcher was born on May 14, 1669, in Milton, Massachusetts and graduated from Harvard College in 1690. (Note: Burgess has the year of his birth as 1670.) After his parents separated, Belcher was raised by his maternal grandparents. His father died in 1678 and, in his will, directed that Belcher should become an apprentice to trade at the age of 14. As he approached that birthday, his grandmother died and left him a "considerable fortune," including 300 acres of land in Milton. She also left him 10 acres of land in Dorchester along with a mill and mill rights. (Note: The mill would later be used by Walter Baker & Company.) As a result, he was very nearly financially independent.

Belcher settled in Dedham on November 29, 1693. Soon after, he married Abigail Thompson, (Note: The daughter of Benjamin and Sussanna Thompson of Roxbury.) and together they had six children. His daughter married Joseph Richards, while his son, Sir Joseph Belcher, was a Harvard graduate and a teacher in the Dedham Public Schools. Belcher was friends with Judge Samuel Sewall and Cotton Mather. Sewall attended his ordination.

In 1721, he came down with a "dangerous paralysis" and went to Roxbury to the home of his son-in-law, Rev. Thomas Walter. There he was cared for by his wife's brother, Dr. Philip Sampson. The church occasionally took up collections to support him during this time. He died in Roxbury on April 27, 1723, and five of the "principal men" of Dedham were appointed to hire a coach to transport his body back to Dedham. The town appropriated 40 pounds to cover the expenses of his funeral and £2.4s for the 'entertainment' of the men who attended his funeral and their horses. He was buried in the Old Village Cemetery. Cotton Mather read a eulogy of him in Boston.

== Ministry ==
He first preached in Dedham on April 17, 1692, and then again for the second time a month later on May 15. He received 15 shillings per day as a guest speaker. The records of the May 23, 1692 Town Meeting indicate that "the Church and Town have given a call" to have Belcher move to Dedham and serve as the minister. Belcher returned to preach on June 12 and did so regularly beginning on October 30. Church records indicate the call was given on December 4, 1692.

Belcher was shy and self-effacing, and had a "calming influence, rational approach and generally non-inflammatory attitude." It was likely his calm approach that saved Dedham from being caught up in the hysteria surrounding the witch trials in Salem and surrounding communities.

He was minister at the First Church and Parish in Dedham from 1693 until 1723, although illness prevented him from preaching after 1721. His portrait, donated in 1839, hangs just left of First Church's pulpit.

Five of his sermons survive. One was delivered before the Great and General Court, one before the Ancient and Honorable Artillery Company, two were preached in Dedham specifically for young people, and one at the ordination of Nathaniel Cotton in Bristol, Rhode Island.

=== Salary ===
A few weeks after settling, on December 23, the Town Meeting voted to set his salary at 60 pounds a year. In 1696, he tried to return to a system of voluntary contributions instead of the taxes imposed to pay the salary of his predecessor, but when that system failed, the tax was reimposed in 1704. By the end of his tenure his salary was 100 pounds a year plus the firewood provided by members of the parish. The town also contributed 60 pounds to build a parsonage on land now owned by the Allin Congregational Church.

== Works cited ==
- Burgess, Ebenezer (1840). Dedham Pulpit: Or, Sermons by the Pastors of the First Church in Dedham in the XVIIth and XVIIIth Centuries. Perkins & Marvin.
- Hanson, Robert Brand (1976). Dedham, Massachusetts, 1635-1890. Dedham Historical Society.
- Lockridge, Kenneth (1985). A New England Town. New York: W.W. Norton & Company. ISBN 978-0-393-95459-3.
- Smith, Frank (1936). A History of Dedham, Massachusetts. Transcript Press, Incorporated.
- Worthington, Erastus (1827). The history of Dedham: from the beginning of its settlement, in September 1635, to May 1827. Dutton and Wentworth.
