= Aaron Fuller (military) =

Captain Aaron Fuller (circa 1738-March 20, 1816) was an early American military official from Dedham, Massachusetts.

Within an hour of the first notice of the Battles of Lexington and Concord reaching Dedham on the morning of April 19, 1775, the "men of Dedham, even the old men, received their minister's blessing and went forth, in such numbers that scarce one male between sixteen and seventy was left at home." A total of 89 men from the first parish went off, led by Fuller and George Guild. He also fought in Shays' Rebellion. The town's gunpowder was stored in a specially built powder house on his land.

He served for 16 years as a Selectman in Dedham, beginning in 1786. Additionally, he was the town treasurer in 1787.

He helped to draft the new covenant at First Church and Parish in Dedham that admitted anyone who professed to be a Christian. Fuller was a deacon in the church. He died on March 20, 1816, at the age of 78.

== Works cited ==
- Abbott, Katharine M. (1903). Old Paths And Legends Of New England (PDF). New York: The Knickerbocker Press. pp. 290–297.
- Hanson, Robert Brand (1976). Dedham, Massachusetts, 1635-1890. Dedham Historical Society.
- Smith, Frank (1936). A History of Dedham, Massachusetts. Transcript Press, Incorporated.
- Worthington, Erastus (1827). The history of Dedham: from the beginning of its settlement, in September 1635, to May 1827. Dutton and Wentworth.
