= Norfolk County Jail (1795) =

Massachusetts historical building

The Norfolk County Jail was a wooden jail located on Highland Street in Dedham, Massachusetts. Following the creation of Norfolk County in 1792, Timothy Gay deeded land to the county for the creation of the jail in October 1794. Construction began that year but it was not complete until 1795. The donated land, next to Gay's tavern on Highland Street, was on the corner of Court Street next to the present day St. Paul's Church.

It received its first prisoner in February 1795. It housed Jason Fairbanks after his murder conviction, but he escaped. Timothy Gay, Jr. was the jail keeper and was indicted, but acquitted.

It was replaced by a new Norfolk County Jail in 1817.

== Works cited ==
- Dedham Historical Society (2001). Dedham. Arcadia Publishing. ISBN 978-0-7385-0944-0.
- Hanson, Robert Brand (1976). Dedham, Massachusetts, 1635-1890. Dedham Historical Society.
- Hurd, Duane Hamilton (1884). History of Norfolk County, Massachusetts: With Biographical Sketches of Many of Its Pioneers and Prominent Men. J. W. Lewis & Company.
- Parr, James L. (1 October 2009). Dedham: Historic and Heroic Tales from Shiretown. Arcadia Publishing Incorporated. ISBN 978-1-62584-277-0.
