= Murder of Elizabeth Fales =

1801 murder in Dedham, Massachusetts

The murder of Elizabeth Fales took place on May 18, 1801, in Dedham, Massachusetts. Her boyfriend, Jason Fairbanks, was convicted of the murder and sentenced to death but escaped from jail before he could be hanged. He was recaptured, returned to Dedham, and hanged before a crowd of 10,000. The case made national headlines in the United States of America.

== Background and murder ==
Jason Fairbanks lived in the family homestead on East Street in Dedham and was courting Elizabeth Fales, two years his junior at 18. (Note: Fales lived on Cedar Street, near the modern day Paul Park.) They both came from old and respected Dedham families (Note: Fairbanks was a descendant of Jonathan Fairbanks.) and met while attending a signing school at the First Church and Parish in Dedham. They carried on a "desultory and somewhat ambiguous relationship" marked by Fales' parents' disapproval, Fairbanks' poor health, and Fales continually breaking up with Fairbanks and then taking him back again.

Jason had told a friend that he "planned to meet Betsey, in order to have the matter settled" and that he "either intended to violate her chastity, or carry her to Wrentham, to be married, for he had waited long enough." On May 18, 1801, Fales met Fairbanks in a "birch grove next to 'Mason’s Pasture'" and told him that she could not marry him. The pasture was about 400 yards from Fales' home.

Fales was stabbed 11 times, including once in the back, and her throat was slashed. Fairbanks staggered to her home, covered in blood, and told her family that she had committed suicide. He also told them that he had also attempted to take his own life, but was unable to, and that accounted for his wounds which left him "still alive, but in a most deplorable situation." Fales' family rushed to their daughter where they found her "writhing in her blood" with her body "cruelly mangled." She was conscious and took a small sip of water, but died soon thereafter in her mother's arms.

The editor of the local paper, Herman Mann, was called to the scene and reported the incident in the next edition of his weekly newspaper under the headline "MELANCHOLY CATASTROPHE!" Fairbanks was too injured to be moved, and was left to recuperate at the Fales' home. He did not attend Fales' funeral, but 2,000 others did, probably making it the largest crowd ever assembled in Dedham up to that time. He was eventually removed by litter to the Norfolk County Jail where he remained until the grand jury indicted him on August 4, 1801.

== Trial of Jason Fairbanks ==
The south face of the courthouse in Dedham Square, as it appeared in 1839.

Fairbanks was arraigned the next day, August 5, and the trial opened on the sixth. Interest in the case involving two prominent families was so great that the trial was moved from the new courthouse to the First Parish Meetinghouse across the street. When that venue proved to still be too small, the trial again moved to the Town Common.

Prosecuting the case was the then-Attorney General James Sullivan. More than 30 witnesses testified that they had heard him make threats against Fales and her parents. Sullivan also presented evidence that suggested Fales could not have inflicted all of her own wounds and demonstrated that Fairbanks borrowed the murder weapon from a field hand that morning. The Fairbanks' family physician, Dr. Kitteridge, testified at the trial about Fales' wounds but was indicted for perjury.

Defending Fairbanks was Harrison Gray Otis and John Lowell. Their defense tried to focused on sentimental issues, trying to create a reasonable doubt in the minds of the jurors. They showed the jury that, due to a smallpox vaccination that ended up harming him, Fairbanks did not have the use of his right arm and was sickly in general. (Note: Hanson believes Fairbanks was also suffering from an undiagnosed case of tuberculosis.) They suggested, though Fairbanks later strongly denied it, that the lovers had a murder-suicide pact. The defense lawyers also tried to show the government witnesses were not trustworthy and that Fales had become unbalanced after reading too many romantic novels. The trial concluded on the evening on August 7. The next day, August 8, the jury found him guilty and he was sentenced to death.

== Escape, capture, and hanging ==
On the night of August 17, Fairbanks escaped from jail along with several others. A $1,000 bounty offered for his capture. Fisher Ames drew up a petition calling for his capture declaring that "the stain of blood is upon this land" and that "no honest man's eyes must sleep in Dedham this night."

The murder, trial, and the escape set off a media firestorm. One newspaper implored readers to "Stop the Murderer!" When Boston's Columbian Centinel, a Federalist newspaper, blamed the escape on a banditti of the Liberty Pole gentry, the Republican Independent Chronicle shot back the next day. The political potshots and retorts continued in the days that followed.

Fairbanks was captured in Skeensborough, New York while waiting for a steamer to bring him to Canada. He was eating his breakfast when he was discovered by Seth Wheelock of Medfield, Captain Henry Tisdale of the Springfield Parish, and Moses Holt of Hadley, Massachusetts. Surprised to have been pursued so far, he said he would have ridden another 400 miles had he known. Fairbanks was not returned to Dedham, the site of his previous escape, but was instead brought to the Suffolk County Jail in Boston.

On September 10, 1801, he was returned to Dedham from the Boston jail and was hanged. To ensure that he would not escape again, he was accompanied by a civil escort to the border of Dedham and Roxbury. Then, once they crossed over into Norfolk County, he was accompanied by a corps of cavalry plus two companies of cavalry and an infantry unit to stand guard at the actual scaffold.

In addition to the military presence, "the 10,000 people who showed up at the Town Common to witness the execution were five times the town’s population at the time." One resident counted 711 carriages driving down Spring Street towards the gallows that morning. It set a new record for the largest crowd in Dedham.

== Legacy ==
Within days of the execution the first of four installments of the Report of the Trial of Jason Fairbanks was published by the Boston firm Russell and Cutler. It was 87 pages long and was issued over the course of several months, making it "the first demonstrably popular trial report published in early national New England." A number of books and pamphlets would be written about the case in the months and years to come including "one of the earliest novels based on an actual murder case," the Life of Jason Fairbanks: A Novel Founded on Fact. Fairbanks' brother, Ebenezer, published a 55-page tract titled The Solemn Declaration of the Late Unfortunate Jason Fairbanks,. From the Original Manuscript, composed and signed by himself, a very short time before his death, To Which is Added Some Account of his Life and Character.

Thomas Thatcher, the minister at the West Church, published a sermon in which he wondered if Fairbanks' hanging and the "riot and confusion" at the end of the day were caused by a hellish legion "of obstreperous, incarnate fiends, who paraded the streets of this peaceful village. Other authors also jumped in as well, publishing a large number of poems and broadsides reflecting on Fales and Fairbanks.

After Fairbanks was dead, attention then turned to those who helped him escape. Stephen Fairbanks, two black men named Jacques and Sam, and Henry Dukeham all testified for the commonwealth. Isaac Whiting, Reuben Farrington, Ebenezer Fairbanks, Edward Sisk, and a person named Davis were all charged with helping Fairbanks escape. Those who testified for the government were acquitted, as were Whiting and Farrington. Ebenezer Fairbanks and Sisk were found guilty and sentenced to four months in jail while Davis got two months. Timothy Gay Jr., the jailkeeper, was charged with being complicit with the escape but this was later disproved. He was, however, turned out of office.

== See also ==
- List of homicides in Massachusetts

== Works cited ==
- Hanson, Robert Brand (1976). Dedham, Massachusetts, 1635-1890. Dedham Historical Society.
