= Norfolk County Correctional Center =

Prison in Dedham, Massachusetts, United States

Coordinates: 42.2600°N 71.2087°W

The Norfolk County Correctional Center is a house of correction located on the median of Route 128 in Dedham, Massachusetts. The facility has 502 beds and opened in 1992. On average, 140 inmates are serving sentences and 260 inmates are awaiting trial. As of May 2019, the superintendent was Michael Harris, who replaced James O’Mara after serving from October 2018.

The Correctional Center replaced the Norfolk County Jail.

== See also ==
- List of Massachusetts state correctional facilities
