= Joseph Ellis (politician) =

American politician

Joseph Ellis, Sr. (1666–1752) was a colonial American politician. He served as an selectman, moderator, and representative to the Great and General Court where he served seven terms.

Ellis resided in the Clapboardtrees section of town, which is today Westwood. His election to the General Court was opposed by those in the central village, and they filed a petition to prevent him from taking his seat 1727. However he was seated anyway.

He was born in Dedham in 1666 and died there in 1752. He was a selectman in 1714, 1715, and 1717. In 1725, 1726, 1728, and 1731 he was elected as a moderator.

He married Dorothy Spaulding in 1690 and Sarah Hemenway in 1703. He had 8 children, including Joseph Ellis Jr.

== Works cited ==
- Lockridge, Kenneth (1985). A New England Town. New York: W.W. Norton & Company. ISBN 978-0-393-95459-3.
- Worthington, Erastus (1827). The History of Dedham: From the Beginning of Its Settlement, in September 1635, to May 1827. Dutton and Wentworth. p. 1.
- Hanson, Robert Brand (1976). Dedham, Massachusetts, 1635-1890. Dedham Historical Society.
