= Samuel Guild =

American politician

Samuel Guild (November 7, 1647 – January 1, 1730) represented Dedham, Massachusetts in the Great and General Court. He also served 20 terms as selectman, beginning in 1693.

== Public service ==
In 1675, Guild was a member of Capt.Samuel Moseley's Company during King Philip's War. He was made a freeman at Salem, Massachusetts in May 1678. He was a selectman of Dedham, Massachusetts from 1693 to 1713. In 1703 he was one of a committee to invest and manage school funds. In 1719 he was a delegate to the General Court.

== Personal life ==
Samuel Guild was born November 7, 1647, to John and Elizabeth (Crook) Guild in Dedham, Mass. Samuel Guild married Mary Woodcock in Dedham on November 29, 1676. Their 10 children were born between 1677 and 1697. He died in Dedham, Massachusetts on January 1, 1730.

== Works cited ==
- Worthington, Erastus (1827). The History of Dedham: From the Beginning of Its Settlement, in September 1635, to May 1827. Dutton and Wentworth. p. 1.
- Burleigh, Charles (1887). The Genealogy and History of the Guild, Guile, and Gile Family. Brown Thurston and Company. p. 26.
- Bodge, George Madison (1891). Soldiers in King Philip's War - Containing lists of the soldiers of Massachusetts Colony, who served in the Indian war of 1675-1677. With sketches of the principal officers, and copies of ancient documents and records relating to the war. David Clap and Son 115 High St. Boston. p. 29.
