= Daniel Fisher (Dedham) =

American politician

Daniel Fisher represented Dedham, Massachusetts in the Great and General Court. He served from 1700 to 1704 and then again in 1712 and 1713. He also served nine terms as selectman beginning in 1690.

In the years leading to the American Revolution Dedham had a number of men rise to protect the liberties of the colonists. When Governor Edmund Andros was deposed and arrested in 1689 it was Dedham's Daniel Fisher who "burst into [John] Usher's house, to drag forth the tyrant by the collar, to bind him and cast him into a fort" and eventually send him back to England to stand trial. Before being sent to England, he was brought to the home of dominion official John Usher and held under close watch.

He died in 1713 and is interred in a tomb at the Old Village Cemetery.

His father, Daniel Fisher, was Speaker of the House of Representatives. He was said to be "heir to his [father's] energetic ardor in the cause of freedom." His daughter, Esther, married Timothy Dwight.

== Works cited ==
- Goodwin, Nathaniel (1982). Genealogical Notes Or Contributions to the Family History of Some of the First Settlers of Connecticut and Massachusetts. Genealogical Publishing Com. ISBN 978-0-8063-0159-4.
- Smith, Frank (1936). A History of Dedham, Massachusetts. Transcript Press, Incorporated.
- Worthington, Erastus (1827). The History of Dedham: From the Beginning of Its Settlement, in September 1635, to May 1827. Dutton and Wentworth. p. 1.
- Webb, Stephen Saunders (1998). Lord Churchill's Coup: The Anglo-American Empire and the Glorious Revolution Reconsidered. Syracuse, NY: Syracuse University Press. ISBN 978-0-8156-0558-4. OCLC 39756272.
- Lustig, Mary Lou (2002). The Imperial Executive in America: Sir Edmund Andros, 1637–1714. Fairleigh Dickinson University Press. ISBN 978-0-8386-3936-8. OCLC 470360764.
- Hanson, Robert Brand (1976). Dedham, Massachusetts, 1635-1890. Dedham Historical Society.
- Abbott, Katharine M. (1903). Old Paths And Legends Of New England (PDF). New York: The Knickerbocker Press. pp. 290–297.
