= Joseph Guild =

American politician

Captain Joseph Guild represented Dedham, Massachusetts in the Great and General Court. He was also town clerk for a total of four years, having first been elected in 1773. Additionally, he served seven terms as selectman, with his first election in 1768.

On the morning of April 19, 1775, a messenger came "down the Needham road" with news about the battle in Lexington. Guild 'gagged a croaker' who said the news was false and in an hour" the "men of Dedham, even the old men, received their minister's blessing and went forth, in such numbers that scarce one male between sixteen and seventy was left at home." Aaron Guild, a captain in the British Army during the French and Indian War, was plowing his fields in South Dedham (today Norwood) when he heard of the battle. He immediately "left plough in furrow [and] oxen standing" to set forth for the conflict, arriving in time to fire upon the retreating British.

== Works cited ==
- Abbott, Katharine M. (1903). Old Paths And Legends Of New England (PDF). New York: The Knickerbocker Press. pp. 290–297.
- Worthington, Erastus (1827). The History of Dedham: From the Beginning of Its Settlement, in September 1635, to May 1827. Dutton and Wentworth. p. 1.
