= Joseph Ellis Jr. =

American politician

Joseph Ellis Jr. (1697-1783) represented Dedham, Massachusetts in the Great and General Court.

He was born in 1697 to Joseph Ellis in Dedham and died there in 1783. He served in the Massachusetts House of Representatives in 1741, 1751, 1758, and 1759. He was a deacon of the First Church and Parish in Dedham from 1735 to 1783. In 1742 and 1743 he was a selectman, and from 1743 to 1753 he was the town treasurer.

He married Judith Lewis in 1714, Susanna Smith in 1747, and Mercy (Tufts) Bradshaw in 1756. He had at least four children. He had a large deal of property at his death.

== Works cited ==
- Worthington, Erastus (1827). The History of Dedham: From the Beginning of Its Settlement, in September 1635, to May 1827. Dutton and Wentworth.
