= Samuel Dexter (Massachusetts politician) =

American merchant and politician associated with Massachusetts

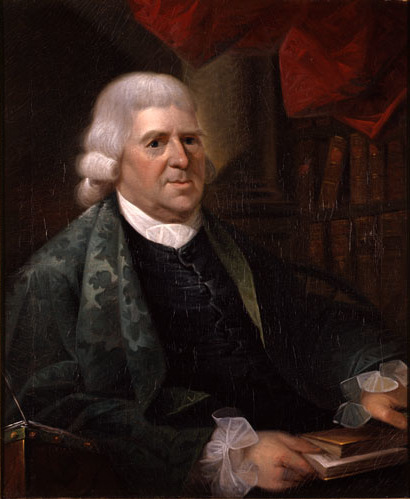

Member of the Massachusetts House of Representatives
- In office 1764–1767, 1775, 1785

Member of the Massachusetts Governor's Council
- In office 1768–1774

Personal details
- Born: 1726 Dedham, Massachusetts Bay
- Died: 1810 (aged 83–84) Woodstock, Connecticut, U.S.
- Children: Samuel Dexter
- Parent: Samuel Dexter (father)

Samuel Dexter (1726—1810) was an early American politician from Dedham, Massachusetts.

== Personal life ==
Born in 1726 in Dedham, he did not wish to follow his father, also named Samuel Dexter, into the ministry at First Church and Parish in Dedham. He married Hannah Sigourney in 1748. His son, the third Samuel Dexter, served in the administrations of John Adams and Thomas Jefferson.

== Career ==
Dexter moved from Dedham to Boston and earned "a modest fortune" with his "mercantile pursuits." He retired back to Dedham in 1761 at the age of 36 to build the Samuel Dexter House. The house still stands today at 699 High Street.

== Political career ==
After retiring to Dedham, he was active in the community for the next 13 years. He was active politically during the Revolutionary War and kept a diary of his thoughts about the day's events. During this time he served in the Massachusetts Provincial Congress. He served in the Massachusetts House of Representatives from 1764 to 1767 and again in 1765, and 1785. From 1768 to 1774, he was a Governor's Councillor. He was a selectman for five terms beginning in 1764, moderator, justice of the peace, and town clerk in 1761. He was town clerk for a total of five years.

Following the evacuation of Boston, General George Washington spent the night of April 4, 1776 at Dexter's home on his way to New York. In December 1771, Dexter hosted John Hancock and Jason Haven, his minister and brother-in-law, for dinner. In July 1771, he invited Governor Thomas Hutchinson and several members of the Council (Note: Possibly James Otis, Artemas Ward, or James Bowdoin.) to dinner.

On the morning of April 19, 1775, a messenger came "down the Needham road" with news about the battle in Lexington. He stopped at the home of Samuel Dexter and ran up to the front door. Dexter met him at the front door and, upon hearing the news, nearly fainted. He had to be helped back into his house.

Dexter believed that it was suicidal for a group of militiamen to face off against the British Army. Instead, he favored having them retreat to the interior to train before facing off against the redcoats. He was accused of not being sufficiently devoted to the patriot cause but was too proud to fight back.

He resigned all his positions in the autumn of 1775 (Note: Smith has the date as 1776.) in ill health and moved to Woodstock, Connecticut. In his will he left $170 to the Dedham Public Schools.

== Works cited ==
- Abbott, Katharine M. (1903). Old Paths And Legends Of New England (PDF). New York: The Knickerbocker Press. pp. 290–297.
- Lockridge, Kenneth (1985). A New England Town. New York: W.W. Norton & Company. ISBN 978-0-393-95459-3.
- Smith, Frank (1936). A History of Dedham, Massachusetts. Transcript Press, Incorporated.
- Worthington, Erastus (1827). The history of Dedham: from the beginning of its settlement, in September 1635, to May 1827. Dutton and Wentworth. p. 29.
- Hanson, Robert Brand (1976). Dedham, Massachusetts, 1635-1890. Dedham Historical Society.
