= Ebenezer Battle =

American politician

Captain Ebenezer Battle, also known as Ebenezer Battelle, represented Dedham, Massachusetts in the Great and General Court. He was a childhood friend of Fisher Ames and also a Dedham selectman in 1779.

Battle marched towards Boston "upon the alarm of the Bunker Hill fight" and fought the retreating British soldiers following the battles of Lexington and Concord. One of his men, Elias Haven, died at Menotomy in the vicinity of the Jason Russell House. After the fighting ended, his men walked the entire length of the battlefield, collecting weapons and burying the dead.

He had one son, Ebenezer Battelle. He was described as "one of the industrious honest yeomanry of the good old bay state who duly appreciated the value of learning."

== Works cited ==
- Hanson, Robert Brand (1976). Dedham, Massachusetts, 1635-1890. Dedham Historical Society.
- Knudsen, Harold M. (2025). Fisher Ames, Christian Founding Father & Federalist. Liberty Hill Publishing.
- Worthington, Erastus (1827). The History of Dedham: From the Beginning of Its Settlement, in September 1635, to May 1827. Dutton and Wentworth. p. 1.
