= Samuel Dexter (minister) =

Minister from Dedham, Massachusetts (1700–1755)

The Reverend Samuel Dexter
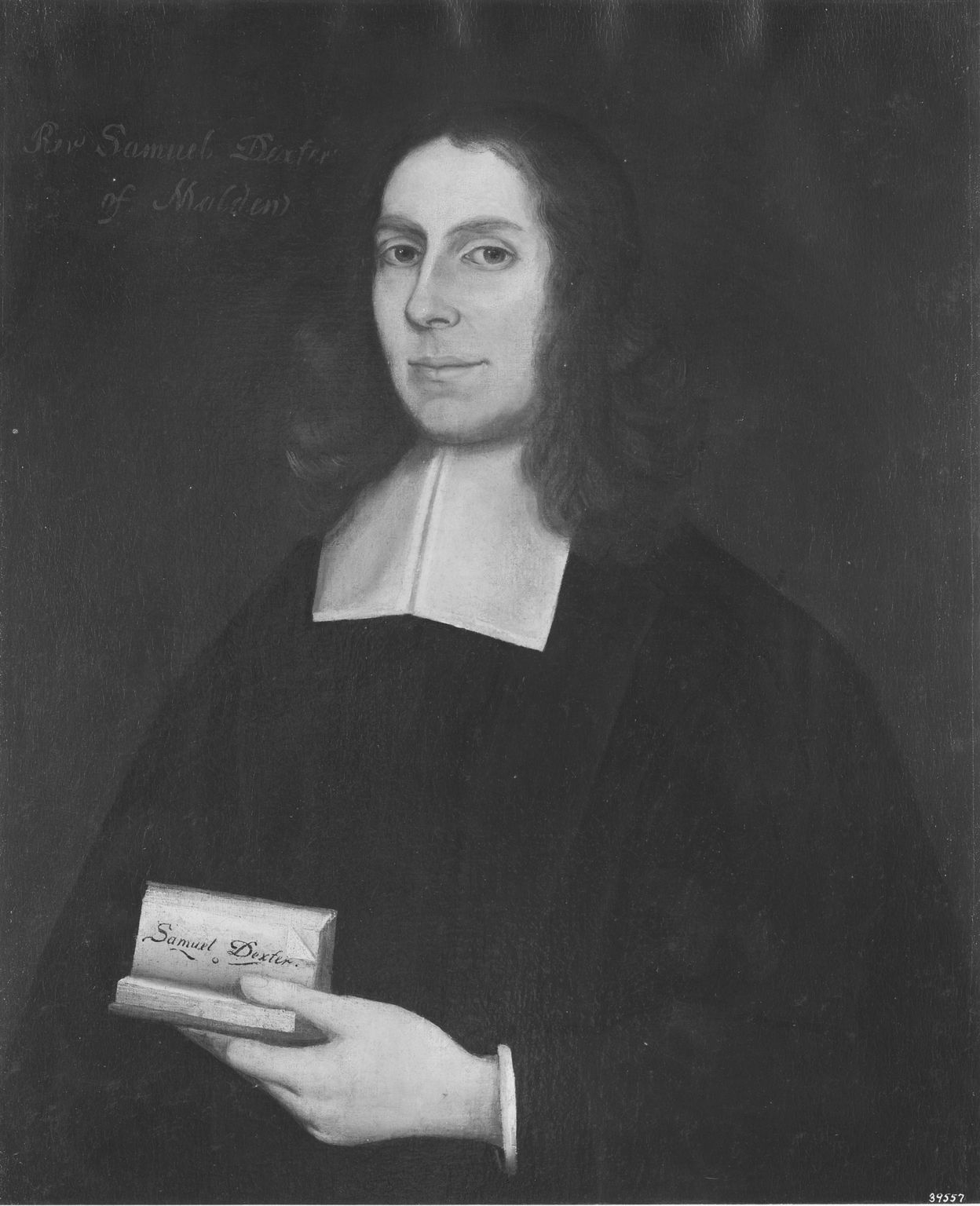

5th Minister of the First Church in Dedham, Massachusetts
- In office May 6, 1724 – January 29, 1755
- Preceded by: Joseph Belcher
- Succeeded by: Jason Haven

Personal life
- Born: October 23, 1700 Malden, Massachusetts Bay
- Died: January 29, 1755 (aged 54) Dedham, Massachusetts Bay
- Resting place: Old Village Cemetery
- Children: 11, including Samuel Dexter
- Education: Harvard College (1720)
- Relatives: Samuel Dexter (grandson)

Religious life
- Religion: Christianity
- Ordination: May 6, 1724

Samuel Dexter (October 23, 1700 – January 29, 1755) was a minister from Dedham, Massachusetts. He ministered there from May 1724 to 1755.

== Personal life ==
Dexter was born in Malden, Massachusetts on October 23, 1700. He graduated from Harvard College in 1720 and taught for a few years. On October 23, 1724, he married Catherine Mears of Roxbury. (Note: After Dexter's death, Catherine married Samuel Barnard of Salem. When Barnard died, she returned to Dedham and lived to the age of 95.) Together they had seven sons and four daughters. One daughter, Catherine, married the man who followed him in the Dedham pulpit, Jason Haven. He had fragile health, an extreme modesty, and "a disposition... to despondency." This made his life, he said, "very weary." He died January 29, 1755 and is buried in the Old Village Cemetery.

His son, who shared the name Samuel Dexter, served in the Great and General Court and on the Massachusetts Governor's Council. His grandson, also named Samuel Dexter, served in the administrations of John Adams and Thomas Jefferson.

Dexter Street in Dedham is named for him and his son.

== Ministry ==
Before moving to Dedham, he turned down calls from churches in Yarmouth, Medford, Westborough, Hopkinton, and Brimfield. Dexter received a deathbed blessing from Increase Mather and was considered a young minister of great potential though "severely introspective and self-critical."

He preached in Dedham for the first time on October 15, 1722 (Note: Hanson has the date as July 1723.) and was called to minister at the First Church and Parish in Dedham several times, beginning in the fall of 1723. His call was opposed by some in the community, but it was for primarily political reasons, not necessarily theological ones. He finally accepted on December 15, 1723. Dexter was ordained on May 6, 1724, and served until his death on January 29, 1755. He lived in the home of his predecessor, Joseph Belcher; his successor and son-in-law, Jason Haven, would later live in it. It was across the street from the meetinghouse, the site of the present day Allin Congregational Church.

During his ministry, several outlying areas of Dedham began to establish their own churches. It was then that the church, which previously had been known as the Church of Christ, began to be called First Church in Dedham. After the churches split his ministry was "calm and quiet," but before he did there were members of the community, whom he called "certain sons of ignorance and pride," who insulted him to his face. Meetings were frequently called to correct the behavior of disorderly members and this led to an ecclesiastical council in July 1725.

== Works cited ==
- Lockridge, Kenneth (1985). A New England Town. New York: W.W. Norton & Company. ISBN 978-0-393-95459-3.
- Worthington, Erastus (1827). The history of Dedham: from the beginning of its settlement, in September 1635, to May 1827. Dutton and Wentworth.
- Smith, Frank (1936). A History of Dedham, Massachusetts. Transcript Press, Incorporated.
- Hanson, Robert Brand (1976). Dedham, Massachusetts, 1635-1890. Dedham Historical Society.
- Burgess, Ebenezer (1840). Dedham Pulpit: Or, Sermons by the Pastors of the First Church in Dedham in the XVIIth and XVIIIth Centuries. Perkins & Marvin.
