= First Parish Westwood Meeting House =

Church building in Massachusetts, United States of America

Coordinates: 42°12′51.8″N 71°12′45.8″W

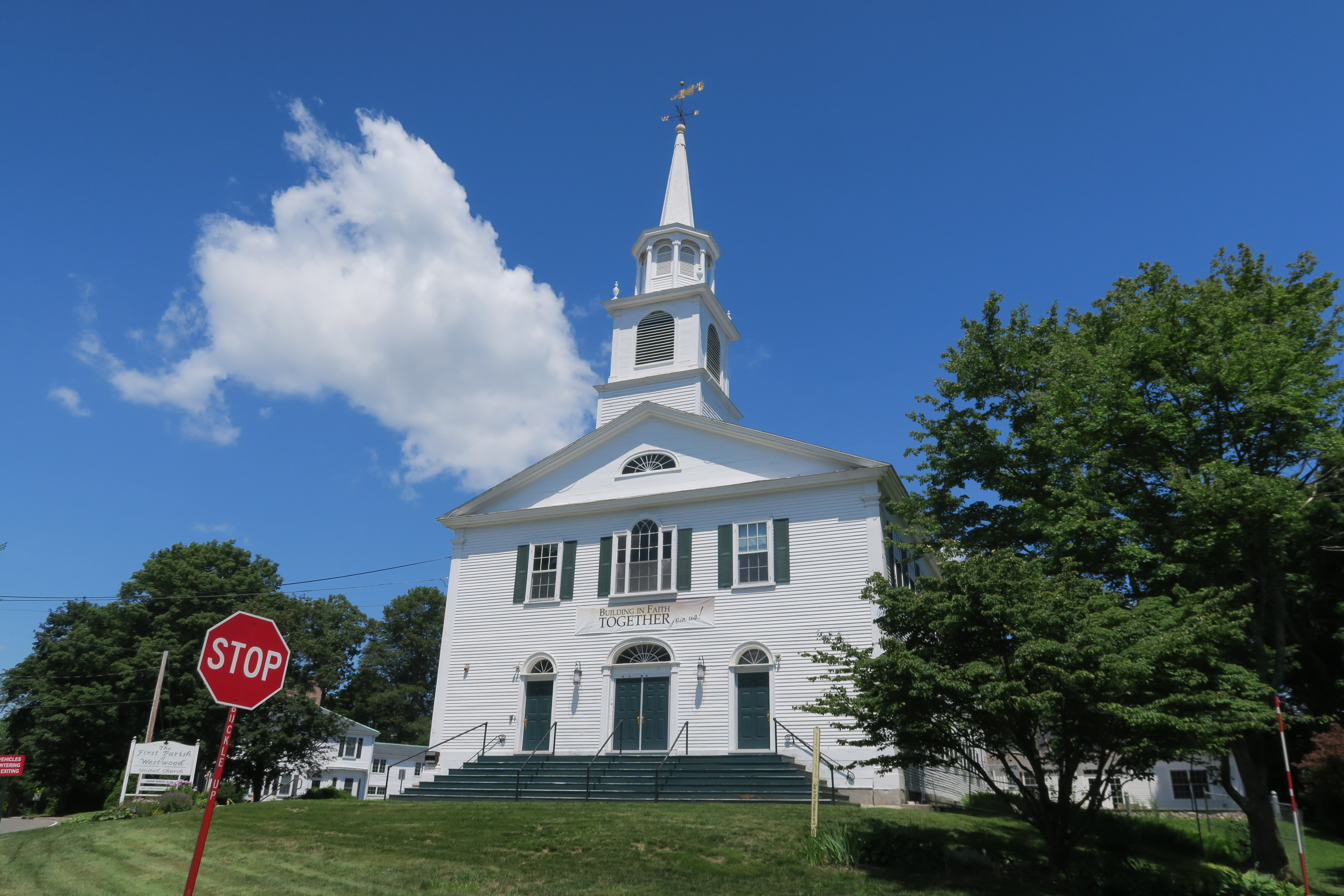
First Parish

The Meeting House of First Parish of Westwood is a meeting house in Norfolk County, Massachusetts. The church celebrated its 200th year of its meeting house on September 27, 2009.

== Meeting House timeline ==
The following is a timeline for the meeting house.

- 1807 - Deacon Ellis’ Rock voted for the location of the new meeting house for the Third Parish of Dedham (Clapboard Trees Parish)
- 1808 – the frame was raised.
- 1809 - the new meeting house was completed at a cost of around $5,500 and dedicated on March 1 with a central pulpit, room for fifty-three oblong box pews on the lower floor and with galleries on three sides.
- 1817 – stoves were installed making it usable year round.
- 1826 – A Sunday School was started; an innovation greatly opposed.
- 1828 – voted that people of color have the southeast pew in the gallery.
- 1855 – remodeling included raising the floor two feet; new semi-circular pews and a rosewood pulpit with much of the funds contributed by the Ladies Benevolent Society.
- 1857- an organ was purchased from First Parish of Dedham.
- 1869 – the first break came in the two services held every Sunday at 10:30 am and 2 pm.
- 1866 – oil lamps were installed.
- 1883 – a lightning strike of unusual power and force struck the church forcing pieces of rock through the floor.
- 1890 – women of the parish were allowed the same right to vote as the men.
- 1900 - the budget for the church was $2045.83 with some income still coming from the rent of pews.
- 1944 – formal federation of the First Parish, Unitarian and First Parish Church, Congregational
- 1947 – electric lights and oil heat installed.
- 1969 – with $185,000 in pledges, a thirty-five foot addition was added along with new pews, a raised chancel, bathrooms as well as rooms for choir and minister.
- 2004 - removing the central pulpit and railing opens the chancel.

On Sunday, September 27, 2009, First Parish’s “Meeting House on the Rock” celebrated its 200th birthday, the oldest Meeting House in continuous use in Norfolk County, Massachusetts
