= Herman Mann =

Herman Mann was a newspaper publisher and entrepreneur from Dedham, Massachusetts.

== Personal life ==
Mann moved to Dedham from Walpole in 1797. With his wife, Sarah (née Haynes) Mann, he had 11 children. He built a large house for his family at 8 Church Street, but it was later relocated to 38 Bullard Street.

== Career ==
The Heaton brothers sold the Columbian Minerva newspaper to Mann in late 1797. After the Minerva closed, he opened a new newspaper, the Norfolk Repository, which also covered the news of Dedham. He also printed books, pamphlets, almanacs, sermons, eulogies, orations, handbills, trade cards, legal notices, and invitations. He also sold books published by others and wallpaper. After purchasing expensive specialized fonts from Europe, he became one of the most prolific publishers of hymns and secular songs in the United States. As a musician, he led a 10-member coalition band.

In April 1799, with partner Daniel Poor, he opened a paper mill on Mother Brook's fourth privilege. Paper at the time was made from recycled linen or cotton rags, and he encouraged the women of the town to collect them in their kitchens and then sell them to him at either the mill or his printing offices. The partnership with Poor only lasted six months, at which point Poor became the sole owner of the mill.

== Works cited ==
- Austin, Walter (1912). Tale of a Dedham Tavern: History of the Norfolk Hotel, Dedham, Massachusetts. Priv. print. at the Riverside Press.
- Hanson, Robert Brand (1976). Dedham, Massachusetts, 1635-1890. Dedham Historical Society.
- Neiswander, Judith (2024). Mother Brook and the Mills of East Dedham. Damianos Publishing. ISBN 978-1-941573-66-2.
