= Thomas Fuller (Massachusetts politician) =

American politician

Coat of Arms of Thomas Fuller

Thomas Fuller (1662–1733) represented Dedham, Massachusetts in the Great and General Court in 1723 and 1724. He also served as a selectman for five years in Dedham, beginning in 1702. He was also the town treasurer from 1715 to 1717.

He was born June 23, 1662, likely in Dedham, and died on April 23, 1733, likely in Needham, Massachusetts. In 1688, he married Esther Fisher and they had six children.

== Works cited ==
- Fuller, F.H. Genealogy of Ensign Thomas Fuller, of Dedham, Massachusetts, and his descendants, 1642-1895. Рипол Классик.
