= Erastus Worthington =

American politician

Erastus Worthington (October 8, 1779 – June 27, 1842) represented Dedham, Massachusetts in the Great and General Court.

== Personal life ==
Worthington was born in Belchertown, Massachusetts on October 8, 1779, to David (Note: David was born in Colchester, Connecticut.) and Affa (Note: Affa was born in Sherburne, Massachusetts.) (née Gilbert) Worthington. In 1804 he was graduated from Williams College.

On May 2, 1815, Worthington married Sally Ellis, the daughter of Abner and Marth Ellis of Dedham. (Note: Sally died June 30, 1856.) Together they had three sons: Ellis, (Note: Ellis as born February 11, 1816.) Albert, (Note: Albert was born July 5, 1820.) and Eratus Jr. (Note: Erastus Jr. was born November 25, 1828.) His son, Eratus Jr., also had a son named Eratus Worthington.

== Career ==
After graduation, Worthington taught for a time and then began to study law in the office of John Heard. He was admitted to the bar in Boston in 1809 and moved to Dedham in the same year to practice law. He was admitted to the bar of the Massachusetts Supreme Judicial Court in 1813.

He worked as a lawyer until 1825 when the newly formed Norfolk Mutual Fire Insurance Company, which he had a large hand in creating, elected him its first secretary. He resigned in 1840 for health reasons. He continued to serve as a justice of the peace.

In the autumn of 1840 he moved to Dayton, Ohio, but returned the following spring to Dedham and remained there until his death two years later.

== Politics ==
During the War of 1812, Worthington was active as a Republican, and during the administrations of Andrew Jackson and Martin Van Buren he was a Democrat. He was elected secretary of the Norfolk County Republican Convention on August 17, 1812. From 1814 to 1815 he was a member of the Great and General Court of Massachusetts.

Worthington was active in the temperance and anti-slavery movements. He was also an advocate of establishing an equity jurisdiction in the Massachusetts courts and published, anonymously, the first pamphlet in favor of it. His ideas, though not in fashion at the time, were later adopted in 1860.

== Historian ==
Worthington was active in chronicling the history of Dedham. He is credited with being the first to record the town's history.

== Works cited ==
- Worthington, Erastus (1827). The history of Dedham: from the beginning of its settlement, in September 1635, to May 1827. Dutton and Wentworth.
