= Dedham Liberty Pole =

Liberty pole erected in 1798 in Dedham, Massachusetts

The Dedham Liberty Pole was a liberty pole erected in 1798 in Dedham, Massachusetts in protest of the Federalist administration. Several of those involved with the pole were arrested, resulting in both the harshest, and the lightest, sentences ever imposed under the Sedition Act of 1798.

== Erection ==
Residents awoke one October morning in 1798 to find a large wooden pole had been erected on the Hartford Road in Clapboard Trees parish. At the top was a Phrygian cap and a hand painted sign declaring

No Stamp act; no sedition; no alien bill; no land tax.
Downfall to the tyrants of America; peace and
retirement to the President; long live the vice
President and the minority; May moral government
be the basis of civil government.

This liberty pole was erected by David Brown, an itinerant veteran of the American Revolution who traveled from town to town in Massachusetts, drumming up subscribers for a series of political pamphlets he had written. The minister in the third parish had been preaching Democratic-Republican principals to his congregation for some time.

Brown was assisted by Benjamin Fairbanks and about 40 others, including Amariah Chapin, who painted the sign. (Note: Some historians have suggested that the words were written by Nathaniel Ames.) Brown held the ladder while another, presumably Fairbanks, put up the sign. Nathaniel Ames was also very likely involved.

When it appeared, Fisher Ames and the rest of Dedham's Federalist community were enraged. Judge John Lowell ordered the "Symbol of Sedition" to be "demolished. The pole was chopped down by a group of Federalists from the second precinct and the culprits were sought before Samuel Bradford, a US Marshall, got to Dedham, but they saved the "libelous label" as evidence.

Fisher Ames wrote that "though the Liberty Pole is down... The Devil of Sedition is immortal; and we, the Saints, have an endless struggle to maintain with him." A Boston newspaper, Russell's Gazette, wrote that "a vagabond Irishman, or Scotchman" was likely the ringleader. Other Federalist press said the pole was "a rallying point for the enemies of a Free Government" and an emblem of "insurrection and civil war."

== Arrest and trials ==
Fairbanks, a prosperous farmer and former Selectman but also an "impressionable, rather excitable man," was quickly arrested and charged with violating the Sedition Act of 1798. He posted bond and was scheduled for trial the following June in Boston. Nathaniel Ames described his arrest as a "pompous array of tyrant power, seized on suspicion and carried out of his own County to answer charges solely within the jurisdiction of his own State laws and in courts of his own County - and held to the excessive bail of 4,000 dollars to answer a tyrannic usurpation on our own Sovereign State!"

Brown, on the other hand, eluded authorities until March 1799, when he was caught in Andover, 28 miles away. While Fairbanks was out on bail, Brown sat for three months in dank jail cell in Salem awaiting trial because he could not afford the $4,000 bail, which was twice the maximum fine if found guilty. When the trial came, Fairbanks was brought before the court first. He requested the legal aid of Fisher Ames, and while Ames declined to serve as the defendant's attorney he did appear as a character witness. Fairbanks, facing the "powerful forces" arrayed against him, confessed on June 8.

Fairbanks said that "it was not then known by me, nor perhaps by others concerned, how heinous an offense it was." He then added that he was a patriotic citizen, and would attempt to live his life accordingly in the future. Justice Samuel Chase sentenced Fairbanks to six hours in prison and a fine of five dollars, plus court costs of 10 shillings, the lightest sentence ever given for any of the Sedition Act defendants. (Note: Hanson has the fine as five shillings.)

On June 9, Brown also pled guilty, but he was not shown the same mercy as Fairbanks. Chase accepted the guilty plea, but insisted on trying the case anyway so that the "degree of his guilt might be duly ascertained." Several Dedham residents, including Chapin, Joseph Kingsbury, Jeremiah Baker, and Luther Ellis, testified against Brown, who was not represented by a lawyer. Nathaniel Ames received what he called "two illegal summons to the High Fed Circ't Court," but refused to appear and testify. He was arrested and charged with contempt of court the following October. Ames was fined $8 and complained to Cushing, his classmate at Harvard, but Cushing refused to waive it and added "insult to injury" by suggesting that he discuss the matter with his brother Fisher. (Note: Slack writes that nothing ever came of the contempt charge.)

Chase offered Brown a chance to reduce his sentence by naming everyone involved with his "mischievous and dangerous pursuits," and the names of all those who subscribed to his pamphlets. Brown refused, saying, "I shall lose all my friends." He did, however, apologize for his political opinions and "more especially in the way and manner I did utter them." Despite this apology, and the promise to change his ways, Chase found "no satisfactory indication of a change of disposition, or amelioration of temper" that might lessen "the punishment which his very pernicious and dangerous practice demanded."

== Sentences and pardon ==
Brown was sentenced to 18 months in prison, a $400 fine, and $80 in court costs, the harshest sentence ever imposed under the Sedition Act. Brown had requested that there be no fine as he had no way to pay it. As he did not have the money, and had no way of earning it while in prison, Brown petitioned President John Adams for a pardon in July 1800, and then again in February 1801. Adams refused both times, keeping Brown in prison.

When Thomas Jefferson became president, one of his first acts was to issue a general pardon for any person convicted under the Sedition Act. This set free Brown and James T. Callendar, the only two remaining in prison. It is unknown what Brown did after his release, or where or when he died.

== Works cited ==
- Hanson, Robert Brand (1976). Dedham, Massachusetts, 1635-1890. Dedham Historical Society.
- Lurie, Shira (2023). The American Liberty Pole: Popular Politics and the Struggle for Democracy in the Early Republic. University of Virginia Press.
- Simon, James F. (March 10, 2003). What Kind of Nation: Thomas Jefferson, John Marshall, and the Epic Struggle to Create a United States. Simon and Schuster. ISBN 978-0-684-84871-6.
- Slack, Charles (2015). Liberty's First Crisis: Adams, Jefferson, and the Misfits Who Saved Free Speech. Atlantic Monthly Press. ISBN 978-0802123428.
- Tise, Larry E. (1998). The American counterrevolution: a retreat from liberty, 1783-1800. Stackpole Books. p. 421. ISBN 978-0-8117-0100-6.
