= Dedham District Court =

Massachusetts district court

Coordinates: 42°14′55″N 71°10′34″W

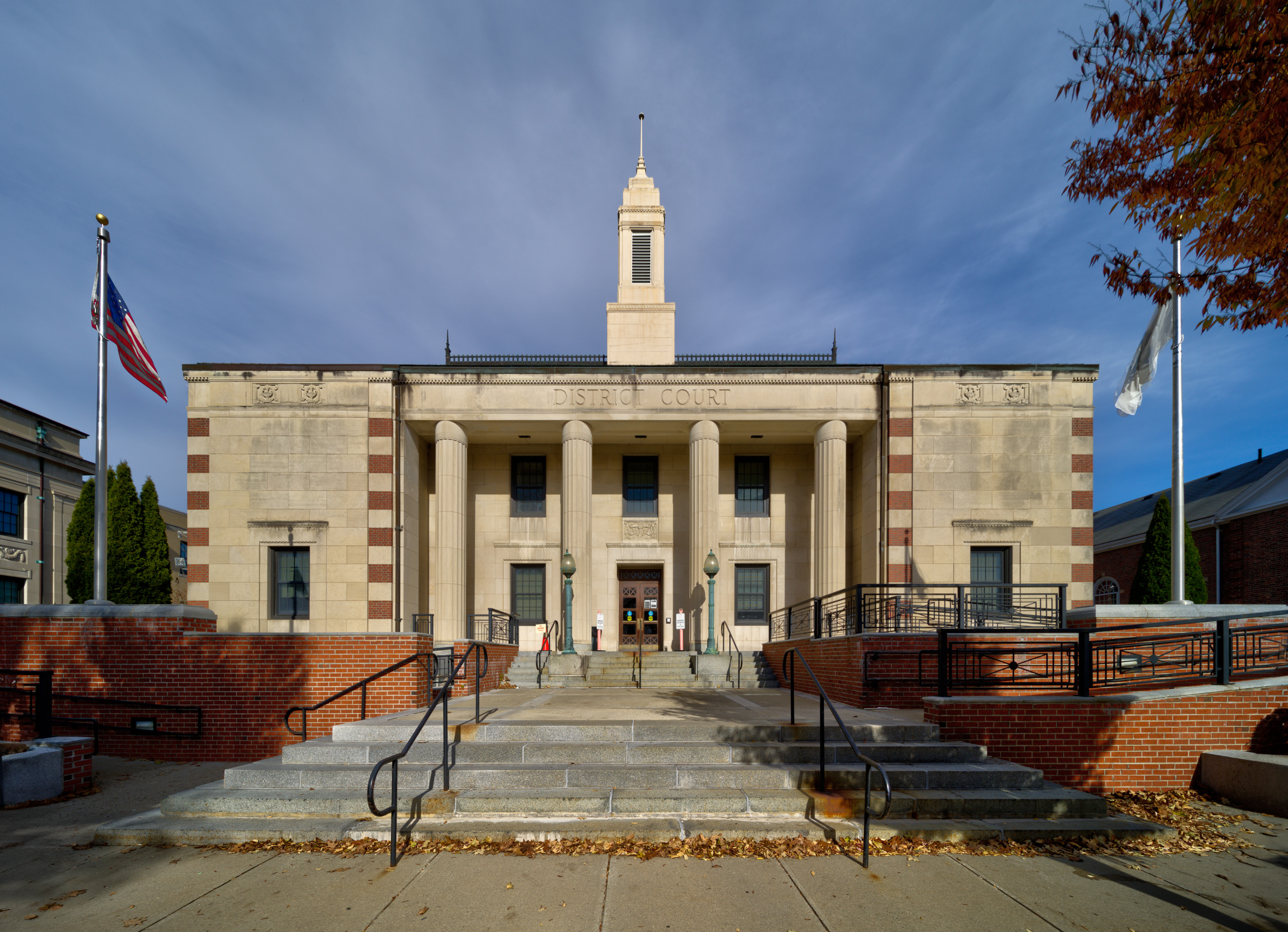
Dedham District Court

The Dedham District Court is a Massachusetts District Court in Dedham, Massachusetts. Scenes from Kathryn Bigelow's 2017 film Detroit, set during the 1967 Detroit riots, were filmed inside. It was built in 1938.

== Notable cases ==
It has been the site of a number of famous trials. During the Millen/Faber trial across the street at the Norfolk County Courthouse, actor Roscoe Ates and many others tried to get inside to watch the proceedings. Court personnel gave him a fake summons to have him appear at the district court to get him in the building.

On July 29, 2021, Theodore McCarrick, a former cardinal of the Catholic Church was charged with sexually assaulting a 16-year-old male in 1974 by Wellesley Police at the courthouse.

On February 13, 2026, Stefon Diggs, a professional football wide receiver for the New England Patriots, would be arranged at the courthouse, entering a plea of not guilty to felony strangulation or suffocation and misdemeanor assault and battery charges.
