= First Church of Christ, Scientist (Dedham, Massachusetts) =

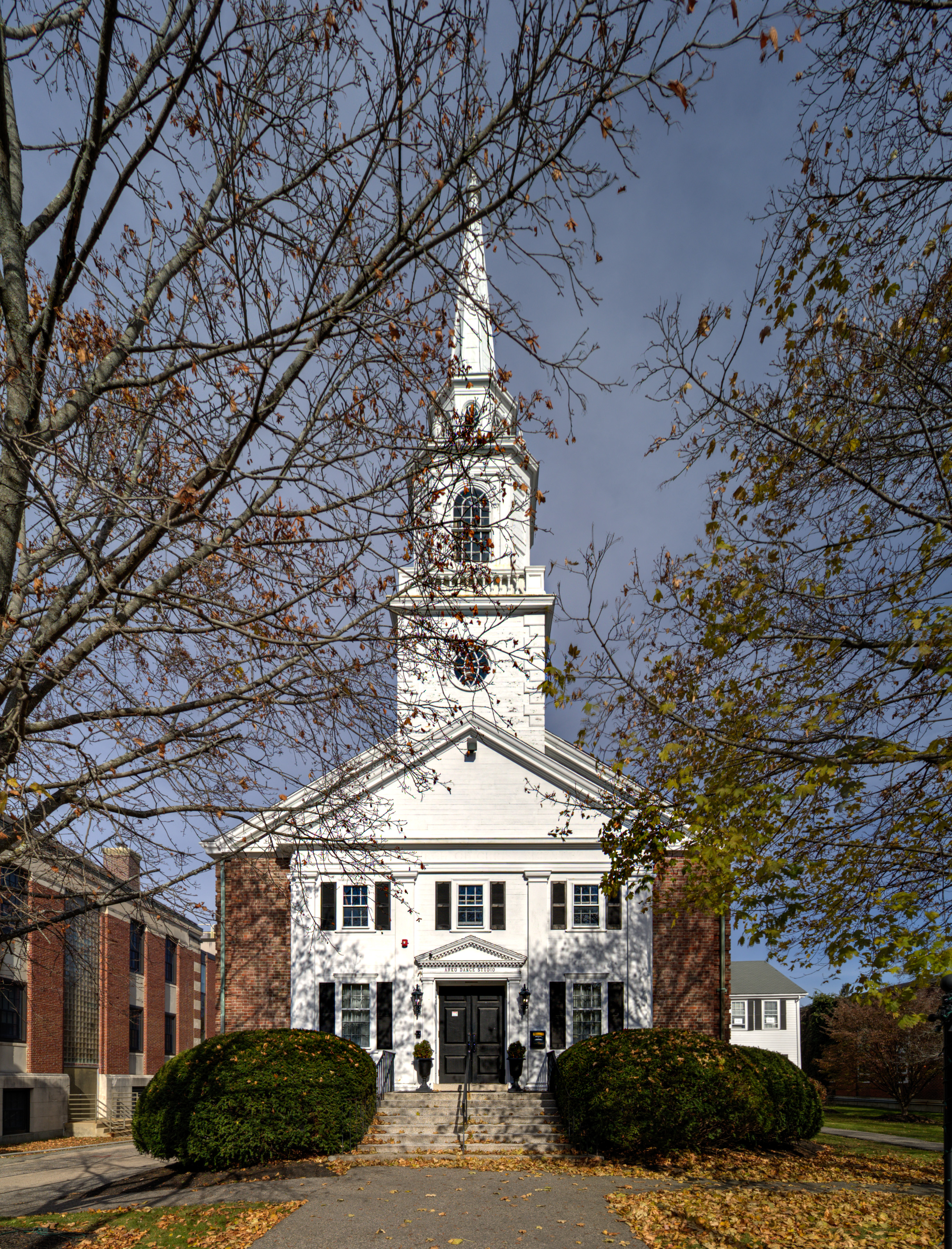
- Akro Dance Studio occupies the church in 2023
- First Church of Christ, Scientist
- 42.2489°N 71.1748°W
- Location: 619 High Street; Dedham, Massachusetts 02026
- Country: United States
- Denomination: Christian Science

Architecture
- Functional status: Defunct
- Style: Georgian Revival
- Years built: 1938-1939
- Groundbreaking: 1938
- Completed: 1939
- Closed: Mid-2000s

The First Church of Christ, Scientist is a former Christian Science church building located in Dedham, Massachusetts. It opened in 1939 and closed in the mid-2000s, later being converted to a dance studio and offices.

== History ==
The cornerstone of the First Church of Christ, Scientist was set in 1938 in Dedham Square, next to the Norfolk County District Court and the Dedham Post Office. The church was finished and opened for worship in 1939. A 1940 image of the church shows it without a steeple, which was added sometime later.

The congregation dissolved in the mid-2000s and the building was unused until 2009, when the back annex was reopened as office space. In May 2010, the main worship building was placed on the market, being advertised as a "creative/loft" space with 5,000 sq. ft. of floor space with the possibility of subdivision. In 2013, the church building was purchased by Fred Astaire Dance Studios and converted for use.

While it is thought that the Christian Scientists who owned at the church dissolved their congregation when they left their building, Christian Science USA still listed the church as an active one in their online directory in 2016, so it is possible that the congregation moved to a different worship location.

== Architecture ==
The building itself is brick Georgian Revival style, with two large halls on two levels. There is a clapboard annex resembling a house jutting of the back of right side. The building is 5,000 sq. ft., and the property is 16,800 sq. ft.

The church's steeple, which was added some years after the building's completion, is wooden with a square base with a railing at the top. The top railing surrounds a narrower square section with flattened corners, with urn-like ornamentations topping each corner. The third section consists of a stout octagonal structure, each side with an oval window. Above this is a tall spire with a gold weather vane on top.
