= Dedham, Massachusetts =

- Town
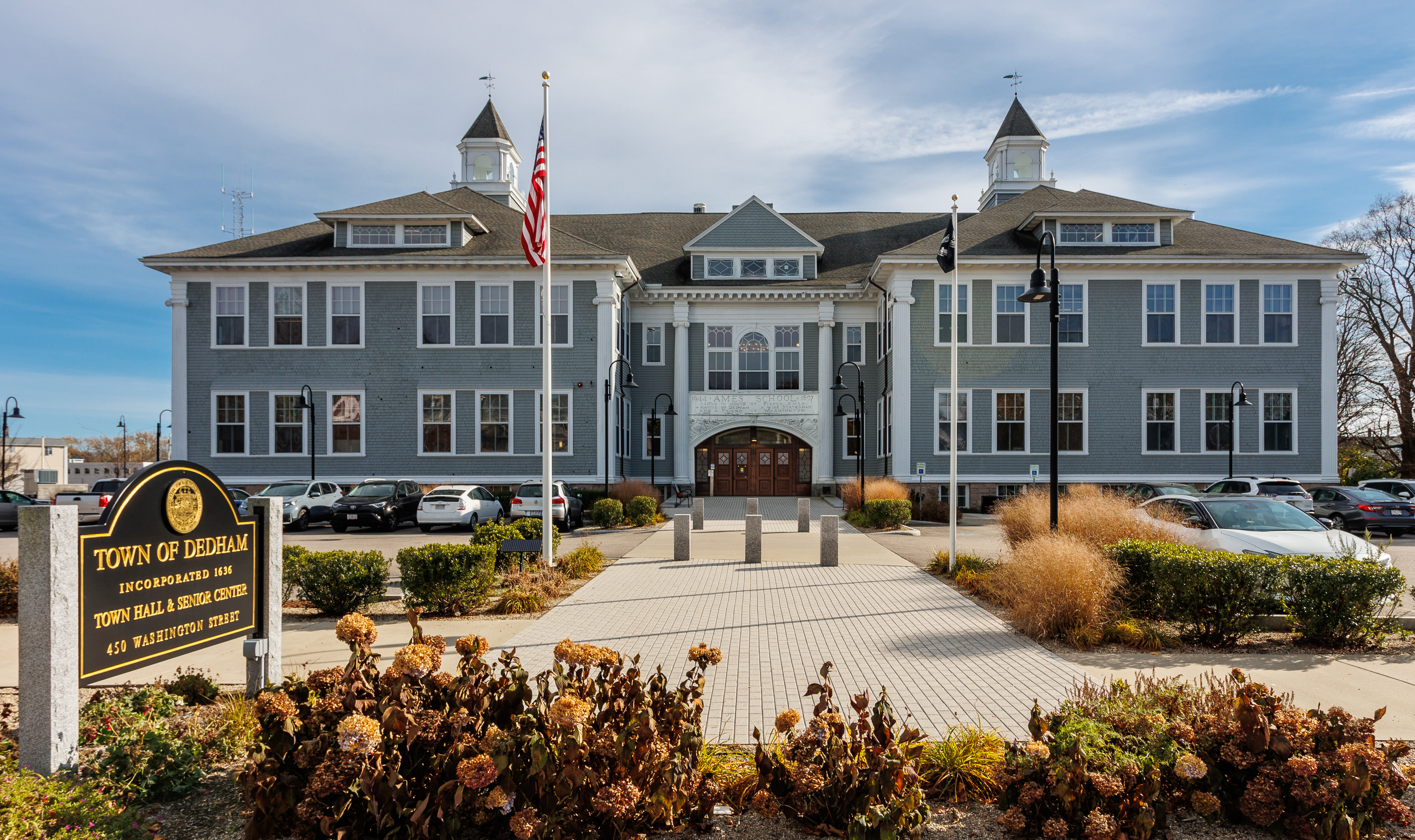
- The Ames Schoolhouse, Dedham's Town Hall

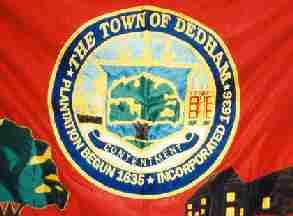
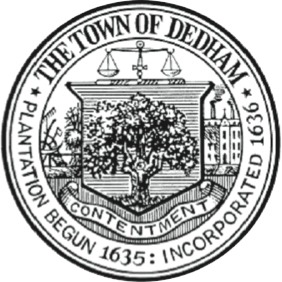
- Flag Seal
- Motto: Contentment
- Location of Dedham in Norfolk County, Massachusetts
- Coordinates: 42°14′30″N 71°10′00″W
- Country: United States
- State: Massachusetts
- County: Norfolk
- Settled: 1635
- Incorporated: 1636
- Named for: Dedham, Essex

Government
  - Type: Representative town meeting
  - Town Manager: Leon Goodwin
  - Select Board: Dennis J. Teehan, Jr., Chair; Erin Boles Welsh, Vice Chair; James A. MacDonald; Dimitria Sullivan; Michelle Persson Reilly

Area
  - Total: 10.7 sq mi (27.6 km^{2})
  - Land: 10.5 sq mi (27.1 km^{2})
  - Water: 0.19 sq mi (0.5 km^{2})
- Elevation: 121 ft (37 m)

Population (2020)
  - Total: 25,364
  - Density: 2,424.1/sq mi (935.94/km^{2})

Ethnicity
  - White alone: 79.4%
  - Black or African American alone: 6.24%
  - American Indian and Alaska Native alone: 0.23%
  - Asian: 3.79%
  - Native Hawaiian and Other Pacific Islander alone: 0.02%
  - Some Other Race alone: 0.3%
  - Two or more races: 6.45%

Hispanic or Latino
  - Hispanic or Latino: 8.38%
  - Not Hispanic or Latino: 91.62%
- Time zone: UTC−5 (Eastern)
  - Summer (DST): UTC−4 (Eastern)
- ZIP Codes: 02026 (02027 for P.O. Boxes)
- Area code: 781 / 339
- FIPS code: 25-16495
- GNIS feature ID: 0618318
- Website: www.dedham-ma.gov

Dedham (/ˈdɛdəm/ DED-əm) is a town in, and the county seat of, Norfolk County, Massachusetts, United States. Located on Boston's southwestern border, the population was 25,364 at the 2020 census.

First settled by English colonists in 1635 and incorporated in 1636, Dedham established the first public school in America in 1643. Dedham is home to the Fairbanks House, the oldest surviving timber-frame house in the United States. On January 1, 1643, by unanimous vote, Dedham authorized the first taxpayer-funded public school, "the seed of American education." The first man-made canal in North America, Mother Brook, was created in Dedham in 1639.

The town took an active part in the American Revolution and was home to the Dedham Liberty Pole in the late 18th century. When a split occurred at the First Church and Parish in Dedham, the resulting lawsuit became known as The Dedham Case, an important landmark in the separation of church and state. In 1921, the historic Sacco and Vanzetti trial was held in the Norfolk County Courthouse. Dedham is sometimes called the "mother of towns" because 14 present-day communities were included within its original broad borders.

Dedham is governed by a representative town meeting, a select board which appoints the town manager, and various other boards and committees. The town is served by MBTA's commuter rail and bus service. The Dedham Public Schools operates seven schools, and a number of private schools also operate within the town.

== History ==
=== 17th century ===
Settled in 1635 by people from Roxbury and Watertown, Dedham was incorporated in 1636. It became the county seat of Norfolk County when the county was formed from parts of Suffolk County on March 26, 1793. When the Town was originally incorporated, the residents wanted to name it "Contentment." The Massachusetts General Court overruled them and named the town after Dedham, Essex in England, where some of the original inhabitants were born. The boundaries of the town at the time stretched to the Rhode Island border.

At the first public meeting on August 15, 1636, eighteen men signed the town covenant. They swore that they would "in the fear and reverence of our Almighty God, mutually and severally promise amongst ourselves and each to profess and practice one truth according to that most perfect rule, the foundation whereof is ever lasting love."

They also agreed that "we shall by all means labor to keep off from us all such as are contrary minded, and receive only such unto us as may be probably of one heart with us, [and such] as that we either know or may well and truly be informed to walk in a peaceable conversation with all meekness of spirit, [this] for the edification of each other in the knowledge and faith of the Lord Jesus…" The covenant also stipulated that if differences were to arise between townsmen, they would seek arbitration for resolution and each would pay his fair share for the common good.

Dedham is home to the Fairbanks House, the oldest surviving timber-frame house in the United States, scientifically dated to 1637. On January 1, 1643, by unanimous vote, Dedham authorized the first taxpayer-funded public school, "the seed of American education." Its first schoolmaster, Rev. Ralph Wheelock, a Clare College graduate, was paid 20 pounds annually to instruct the youth of the community. Descendants of these students would become presidents of Dartmouth College, Yale University, and Harvard University.

The first man-made canal in North America, Mother Brook, was created in Dedham in 1639. It linked the Charles River to the Neponset River. Although both are slow-moving rivers, they are at different elevations. The difference in elevation made the canal's current swift enough to power several local mills.

=== 18th century ===
Just 15 months after asking for their own church, 40 men living on the north side of the Charles River suddenly asked the General Court to separate them from Dedham. Their petition cited the inadequate services provided, namely schools and churches. They also said that, if they were simply to be made a precinct instead of a separate town, that they would suffer political reprisals. Dedham agreed that the services were inadequate and did not oppose the separation, but did try to reduce the amount of land the separatists were seeking. Dedham also asked for a delay of one year. The General Court agreed with the petitioners, however, and created the new town of Needham with the original boundaries requested. Those who remained in Dedham still held rights to the unallotted lands in Needham, however, and any decrease in taxes would be offset by a decrease in expenditures. There may have also been some satisfaction in separating themselves from those on the other side of the 1704 power struggle.

In November 1798, David Brown led a group in Dedham protesting the federal government; they set up a liberty pole, as people had before the American Revolution. It carried the words, "No Stamp Act, No Sedition Act, No Alien Bills, No Land Tax, downfall to the Tyrants of America; peace and retirement to the President; Long Live the Vice President", referring to then-President John Adams and Vice President Thomas Jefferson. Brown was arrested in Andover but because he could not afford the $4,000 bail, he was taken to Salem for trial. Brown was tried in June 1799. Although he wanted to plead guilty, Justice Samuel Chase urged him to name those who had helped him or subscribed to his writings in exchange for freedom. Brown refused, was fined $480, and sentenced to eighteen months in prison. It was the most severe sentence up to then imposed under the Alien and Sedition Acts.

=== 19th century ===
In 1818, though citizens were still taxed for the support of ministers and other "public teachers of religion", Dedham set a precedent toward the separation of church and state. Residents of the town selected a minister different than that chosen by the church members; the selection by residents was confirmed by the Supreme Judicial Court. This decision increased support for the disestablishment of the Congregational churches.

The local Endicott Estate burned to the ground in 1904 after the local volunteer fire department, responding to three separate fires burning simultaneously, reached the Endicott fire last. By the time they arrived, only ashes remained. It is said that the estate's owner, Henry Bradford Endicott (also founder of the Endicott Johnson Corporation) took the burning of the homestead as a divine command to rebuild (which he did). The rebuilt Endicott Estate is listed on the National Register of Historic Places. The estate and surrounding grounds are open to the public, upholding Henry's stepdaughter Katherine's wish to use the house and property for "educational, civic, social and recreational purposes."

=== 20th century ===
In 1921, the historic Sacco and Vanzetti trial was held in the Norfolk County Courthouse. Dedham Pottery is a cherished class of antiques, characterized by a distinctive crackle glaze, blue-and-white color scheme, and a frequent motif of rabbits and other animals. Dedham is sometimes called the "mother of towns" because 14 present-day communities were included within its original broad borders.

=== 21st century ===
In March 2023, Dedham dedicated an 84,000 square-foot public safety complex on the site of the former Town Hall at 26 Bryant Street.

== Geography ==
Dedham is located at 42°14′40″N 71°9′55″W (42.244609, −71.165531). On the northwest it is bordered by Needham, on the southwest by Westwood, on the northeast by Boston, and on the southeast by Canton.

On the northeastern corner of High Street and Court Street, the United States Coast and Geodetic Survey placed a small medallion into a granite block showing an elevation of 112.288 feet. According to the United States Census Bureau, the town has a total area of 10.6 square miles (27 km^{2}), of which 10.4 square miles (27 km^{2}) is land and 0.2 square miles (0.52 km^{2}) (1.79%) is water.

The Town Forest is the only such forest in the nation located in the median strip of a highway.

=== Neighborhoods ===
Dedham is made up of a number of neighborhoods:

- In the geographical center of town is Oakdale. This is roughly defined by East Street to the west, Cedar Street to the south and east, and Whiting Ave to the north.
  - The houses in the area around Woodleigh Road, which was declared to be one of the best streets in Greater Boston, have many homes designed by Henry Bailey Alden, who also designed the Endicott Estate.
  - The subdivision consisting of Morse Avenue, Fulton Street, and Edison Avenue, is named Whiting Park.
- Riverdale is an island surrounded by the Charles River and Long Ditch.
- Greenlodge runs along the axis of Greenlodge Street. In its early days, it became known as the Peanut Butter Valley, as it was said that after paying for their expensive new homes, that residents could only afford to eat peanut butter sandwiches.
- The Manor comprises the neighborhood south of Sprague Street.
- East Dedham falls between Mother Brook and the Boston line.
- Precinct One, or Upper Dedham, is in the northwestern corner of the town, between High Street and Common Street and the Westwood and Needham lines.
  - Job's Island, named for Job Richard, is now a peninsula at 91 Common Street.
  - Highland Street, near Lowder Street, runs up Earwicker's Hill.
- Ashcroft is the neighborhood between Cedar Street and Sprague Street. It includes Paul Park and the Capen School.
  - The undeveloped strip of land between Beech Street and Turner Street is known as Ogden's Woods.
- Fairbanks is the neighborhood between East Street and Wigwam Pond.

== Climate ==
Dedham has a warm-summer humid continental climate (Dfb under the Köppen climate classification system), with high humidity and precipitation year-round.

Climate data for Dedham, Massachusetts
Month	Jan	Feb	Mar	Apr	May	Jun	Jul	Aug	Sep	Oct	Nov	Dec	Year
Record high °F (°C)	66 (19)	67 (19)	74 (23)	82 (28)	91 (33)	95 (35)	100 (38)	97 (36)	97 (36)	87 (31)	77 (25)	66 (19)	100 (38)
Mean daily maximum °F (°C)	33.6 (0.9)	34.7 (1.5)	43.4 (6.3)	54.9 (12.7)	66.4 (19.1)	74.7 (23.7)	80 (27)	78 (26)	70.9 (21.6)	60.5 (15.8)	48.9 (9.4)	37.4 (3.0)	57.0 (13.9)
Daily mean °F (°C)	26 (−3)	26 (−3)	33 (1)	42 (6)	53 (12)	62 (17)	68 (20)	66 (19)	60 (16)	50 (10)	39 (4)	30 (−1)	46 (8)
Mean daily minimum °F (°C)	18.3 (−7.6)	18.8 (−7.3)	27 (−3)	36.5 (2.5)	46.4 (8.0)	55.4 (13.0)	61.5 (16.4)	60.3 (15.7)	53.4 (11.9)	43.4 (6.3)	33.7 (0.9)	22.8 (−5.1)	39.8 (4.3)
Record low °F (°C)	−14 (−26)	−21 (−29)	−5 (−21)	6 (−14)	27 (−3)	31 (−1)	44 (7)	32 (0)	28 (−2)	20 (−7)	5 (−15)	−19 (−28)	−21 (−29)
Average precipitation inches (mm)	4.2 (110)	3.9 (99)	4.6 (120)	4.1 (100)	3.7 (94)	3.6 (91)	3.7 (94)	4.1 (100)	4 (100)	4 (100)	4.4 (110)	4.4 (110)	48.7 (1,228)
Average snowfall inches (cm)	16.1 (41)	16 (41)	12 (30)	3.1 (7.9)	0.1 (0.25)	0 (0)	0 (0)	0 (0)	0 (0)	0.3 (0.76)	2.7 (6.9)	11.7 (30)	62 (157.81)
Average precipitation days	12	11	13	12	12	12	11	10	9	10	11	12	135
Source 1: Climate Summary for Dedham, Massachusetts
Source 2: Monthly- All Data for Dedham, Massachusetts

== Demographics ==
As of the census of 2020, there were 23,464 people, 8,654 households, and 6,144 families residing in the town. The population density was 2,415.6 inhabitants per square mile (932.7/km^{2}). There were 10,885 housing units at an average density of 852.2 per square mile (329.0/km^{2}). The racial makeup of the town was 82.04% White, 5.1% Black or African American, 0.00% Native American, 1.87% Asian, 0.04% Pacific Islander, 0.80% from other races, and 6.8% from two or more races. 7.5% of the population were Hispanic or Latino of any race. As of 2024, the most common ethnic groups are those of Irish or Italian heritage, with many descended from those who came to work in the mills along Mother Brook. The largest religious group are Catholics.

There were 8,654 households, of which 30.1% had children under the age of 18 living with them. 56.3% were married couples living together, 11.1% had a female householder with no husband present, and 29.0% were non-families. 23.9% of all households were made up of individuals, and 10.4% had someone living alone who was 65 years of age or older. The average household size was 2.61 and the average family size was 3.14.

Dedham's population was spread out, with 22.2% under the age of 18, 5.8% from 18 to 24, 31.1% from 25 to 44, 24.2% from 45 to 64, and 16.6% who were 65 years of age or older. The median age was 40 years. For every 100 females, there were 93.4 males. For every 100 females age 18 and over, there were 92.0 males.

The median income for a household in the town was $128,955. The per capita income for the town was $69,825. About 3.2% of families and 4.6% of the population were below the poverty line, including 3.9% of those under age 18 and 6.5% of those age 65 or over.

Historical population

Year	Pop.
1637	31 men, plus their families
1640	>200
1648	~400
1651	~100 families
Late 1650s	150+ men, plus others
1666	83 legal voters
1686	>600
1700	700–<750 (Note: In 1711, there were 45 families living north of the Charles River.)
1736	1,200
1750	1,500–1,600
1761	<1,900
1765	1,919
1775	>2,000
1790	1,659
1800	1,973

Year	Pop.
1801	2,000
1830	3,057
1837	3,532
1850	4,447
1860	6,330
1865	7,198 (Note: 27% of the population was foreign-born, and 75% of them were from Ireland. The other 25% were German-speaking.)
1870	7,342
1880	6,233
1888	6,641 (Note: In 1880, the population of East Dedham was 3,600.)
1890	7,123
1892	>7,000
1895	7,211
1899	6,641 (Note: The population decreased in 1897 when Westwood separated and became its own town. The proportion of foreign-born residents then grew to more than 28%.)
1900	7,457
1908	7,774

Year	Pop.
1910	6,641
1915	9,284
1920	10,782
1930	11,043
1940	15,136
1950	15,508
1960	18,407
1970	23,869
1980	26,938
1990	25,298
2000	23,782
2002	23,378
2010	24,729
2020	25,364
2023	24,968

=== Religion ===
Religious affiliation in Dedham, Massachusetts, 1980–2010
Religion	1980	1990	2000	2010
Catholic	50.14%	54.67%	58.58%	52.97%
Mainline Protestant	13.34%	7.3%	6.18%	4.93%
Evangelical Protestant	.85%	1.88%	1.45%	1.69%
Orthodox Christian	n/a	n/a	1.16%	.53%
Other	1.27%	6.88%	7.13%	4.56%
Unaffiliated	34.39%	29.28%	25.52%	35.33%

== Seal and flag ==
The town's seal was originally designed by a member of the Dedham Historical Society. In the center is a crest containing the Old Avery Oak. When the tree was finally felled, the gavel used by the Moderator at Town Meeting was carved out of it. The gavel was designed and carved by Edward F. Snow Sr., whose family were long time residents. Above the tree are the scales of justice, representing Dedham as the county seat and home to Norfolk County's courts. On the left of the tree are agricultural instruments, and on the right is a factory, showing Dedham's history first as a town of farmers and then as one with a number of mills and factories, particularly along Mother Brook. Below the tree is a banner with the word "Contentment", the name of the original plantation.

The town flag is red with the seal prominent and in the center. In the lower left corner is part of the Avery Oak, and in the lower right is part of the Fairbanks House. It hangs in the select board's chambers at town hall and in the Great Hall of the Massachusetts State House.

== Government ==
A charter adopted in 1998 lays out the basic structure of the Town government, although it has been amended occasionally over the years. A seven-member Charter Advisory Committee, appointed in 2012, recommended six substantial changes and numerous minor changes be made to the document. The Selectmen consolidated them into six articles for Town Meeting's consideration, and five were presented to the Meeting in 2013. Voters approved four of them in 2014. A version of the sixth and final proposal was adopted at the Spring 2014 Annual Town Meeting.

=== Town Meeting ===
According to Dedham's charter, the "administration of all the fiscal, prudential, and municipal affairs of the town, with the government thereof, shall be vested in a legislative branch, to consist of a representative town meeting". Town Meeting is to consist of no less than 270 members, but not more than necessary to achieve an equal number coming from each precinct. There are currently seven districts, but could be as few as six or as many as nine, with lines drawn by the Select Board and the Registrars of Voters every ten years.

Votes are by voice unless members call for a standing or roll call vote, either of which can be called for by the Moderator. All Town officers are required to attend Town Meeting and multiple member bodies must send at least one representative who have all the privileges of a Member except the right to vote. If 5% of Town voters petition the Select Board within 14 days of Town Meeting, any action taken may be submitted to voters. The final result is to be determined by majority vote, but Town Meeting can not be overruled unless 20% of registered voters participate.

Town Meeting sets its own rules and keeps a journal of proceedings. The Town Meeting may establish various ad-hoc and standing committees on which any Town Meeting Member or voter may serve.

Before each Spring Annual Town Meeting, the Public Service Recognition Award is given to recognize citizens who have performed outstanding acts of service to the community.

==== Town Meeting members ====
Currently Town Meeting consists of 273 members, or representatives, with each of the seven districts, or precincts, electing 39. Thirteen are elected from each precinct each year and serve a three-year term. Each precinct elects from its own members a chairman, vice chairman, and secretary.

To be eligible, candidates must have 10 registered voters from their precinct sign nomination papers. Town Meeting Representatives can not serve on any other elected board or on the Finance and Warrant Committee. Members who move from the district or are removed by redistricting may serve until the next Town Election; however, any member who moves out of the Town immediately ceases to be a Member.

In case of a vacancy, the remaining term is to be filled at the next town election. If no election is to take place within 120 days of the vacancy, then the district chairman is to call together the members of the district, and they are to elect a member who will serve until the next town election.

==== Warrant ====
The Warrant at Town Meeting includes the articles to be voted on. Any elected or appointed board, committee, town officer, or any ten voters may place an article on the warrant. Each article to be voted on is directed by the Select Board to an appropriate board or committee to hear and provide the original motion at Town Meeting. All articles expending funds are directed to the Finance Committee; articles dealing with planning and zoning to the Planning Board; articles relating to by-laws to the By-Law Committee. The Finance Committee recommendation has the force of the original motion on all articles except those related to zoning. The Planning Board makes the original motion for those.

==== Mini Town Meeting ====
The chairmen of the several districts elect from amongst themselves a chairman. This Chairman of the chairmen hosts what is officially known as the District Chairmen's Warrant Review Meeting, but is much more commonly referred to as Mini Town Meeting. The "Mini", first held in 1978, is generally a week or two before the actual Town Meeting. The purpose of the Mini is to air out several of the contentious issues before bringing them to the floor of Town Meeting.

=== Select Board ===
The executive branch of the Town Government is "headed" by a Select Board. The Board has five members who are elected for three-year terms and serve as the chief policy-making body for the town. They appoint a Town Manager, who runs the day-to-day affairs of the Town. They also appoint constables, registrars of voters and other election officers, the board of appeals, conservation commission, historic district commission, and members of several other multiple member boards. Dennis J. Teehan Jr. serves as chair, with Erin Boles Welsh serving as Vice Chair. James A. MacDonald, Dimitria Sullivan and Michelle Persson Reilly also serve as members.

Select board members set policy for all departments below it, but are not involved in the day-to-day affairs of the Town. They issue licenses and can investigate the affairs and the conduct of any town agency.

=== Town Clerk ===
The Elected Town Clerk serves a three-year term and works full-time for the Town. The Clerk is "the keeper of vital statistics of the town and the custodian of the town seal and all public records, administer[s] the oaths of office to all town officers... [and is] the clerk of the town meeting." In the role as clerk of town meeting, he notifies the public and members of the Town Meeting and keeps a verbatim record of proceedings. The current Town Clerk is Paul Munchbach.

=== Town Moderator ===
Town Meetings are presided over by the Town Moderator, but she has no vote unless all the Members present and voting are equally divided. At the first Town Meeting following the annual town election, she is to appoint, subject to Town Meeting's confirmation, a Deputy Moderator from the elected Members. The Deputy serves in case of the Moderator's absence or disability. The current Town Moderator is Elizabeth O'Donnell.

=== Other boards and committees ===
The seven members of the School Committee are elected for three-year terms and appoint a Superintendent of Schools. They also set policy for the School Department. The School Committee is currently chaired by Mayanne MacDonald Briggs, with Stephen Acosta serving as Vice Chair. The other members of the committee are Chris Polito, Leah Flynn Gallant, Laurie Twomey, Joshua Langmead, and William (Bill) Walsh.

The three elected members of the Board of Assessors serve three-year terms and annually make a fair cash valuation of all property within the town. The current chair is Michael T. Polito. Richard J. Schoenfeld serves as Vice Chair and George Panagopoulos serves as Secretary.

The three elected members of the Board of Health are responsible for the formulation and enforcement of rules and regulations affecting the environment and the public health. Currently the board is chaired by Bernadette Chriokas. Leanne Jasset serves as Vice Chair, and Emma Reidy serves as a member.

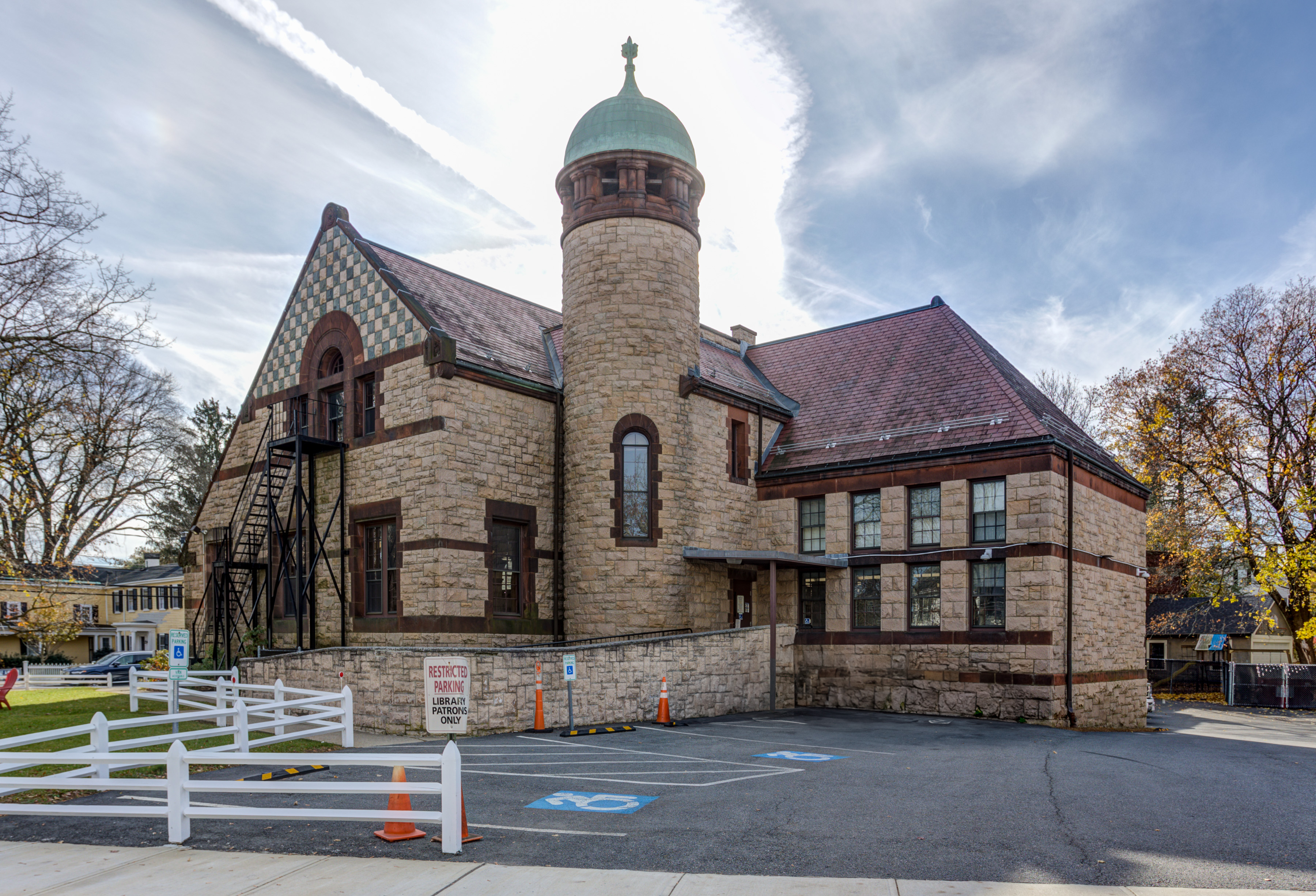
Dedham Public Library

The Board of Library Trustees has five members, each of whom serves three-year terms, and has care of the town's public library at the Endicott Branch and Main Branch. The Board develops policies to dictate how the library functions and operates. The Board is responsible for the library's buildings, including library hours and building use outside of regular operating hours. The Board also reviews the Director's budget request, makes recommendations, and officially adopts the operating budget. The current chair is Tom Turner, with Brian Keaney serving as Vice Chair. Crystal Power serves as Clerk. Annette Raphel and Rita Chapdelaine also serve as members.

The five elected members of the Planning Board make studies and prepare plans concerning the resources, possibilities, and needs of the town. It also prepares the Master Plan. Currently the board is chaired by Michael A. Podolski, Esq., with Jessica Porter serving as Vice Chair. James E. O'Brien IV serves as Clerk. John Bethoney and James F. McGrail, Esq. are also members. Andrew Pepoli serves as an unelected Associate.

There are five elected members of the Parks & Recreation Commission. Section 3-10 of the Town Charter states that the goal of the commission is to promote physical education, play, recreation, sport and other programs for people of all ages. The commission is currently chaired by Lisa Farnham, with Jon Briggs serving as Vice Chair. Lisa Moran, Chuck Dello Iacono, and Ryan O'Toole are also members.

There are five elected Commissioners of Trust Funds who manage and control all funds left, given, bequeathed, or devised to the town, and distribute the income in accordance with the terms of the respective trusts. The commission's Chair is Emily Reynolds, with Nicole P Munchbach serving as Vice Chair and Salvatore A Spada as Clerk. Robert Desmond and Dan Jon Oneil Jr. are also members.

There are five members of the Housing Authority Board. Four are elected by the Town and one is appointed by the Commonwealth Commissioner of Community Affairs. As members of the Board, they have all of the powers and duties which are given to housing authorities under the constitution and laws of the Commonwealth. The current chair is Donna M. Brown Rego and Margaret Matthews serves as the Assistant Chair & State Appointee. Skye Kessler serves as Treasurer, John B. Kane as Assistant Treasurer, and John Wagner as a member.

== Politics ==
United States presidential election results for Dedham, Massachusetts
Year	Republican		Democratic		Third party(ies)	
Year	No.	%	No.	%	No.	%
1900	1,498	57.39%	1,008	38.62%	104	3.98%
1904	1,634	60.81%	925	34.43%	128	4.76%
1908	1,750	61.84%	904	31.94%	176	6.22%
1912	958	29.94%	1,214	37.94%	1,028	32.13%
1916	1,734	49.30%	1,641	46.66%	142	4.04%
1920	4,660	66.99%	1,998	28.72%	298	4.28%
1924	4,602	59.02%	1,828	23.44%	1,368	17.54%
1928	5,956	52.44%	5,346	47.07%	56	0.49%
1932	3,090	50.46%	2,851	46.55%	183	2.99%
1936	3,693	52.40%	2,952	41.88%	403	5.72%
1940	4,858	60.54%	3,130	39.00%	37	0.46%
1944	4,605	59.30%	3,134	40.36%	27	0.35%
1948	4,361	52.91%	3,726	45.20%	156	1.89%
1952	6,300	63.17%	3,622	36.32%	51	0.51%
1956	7,120	66.23%	3,548	33.00%	82	0.76%
1960	5,307	43.35%	6,917	56.51%	17	0.14%
1964	3,254	26.49%	8,999	73.26%	30	0.24%
1968	4,305	33.56%	7,911	61.68%	610	4.76%
1972	6,041	45.20%	7,209	53.94%	115	0.86%
1976	6,137	45.55%	6,853	50.86%	483	3.58%
1980	6,367	46.81%	5,071	37.28%	2,164	15.91%
1984	7,040	54.71%	5,782	44.94%	45	0.35%
1988	6,440	49.53%	6,341	48.77%	222	1.71%
1992	4,409	33.94%	5,675	43.68%	2,907	22.38%
1996	3,672	32.36%	6,620	58.33%	1,057	9.31%
2000	4,110	34.38%	7,028	58.79%	817	6.83%
2004	4,866	39.31%	7,410	59.87%	101	0.82%
2008	5,361	42.00%	7,108	55.69%	294	2.30%
2012	5,734	41.83%	7,757	56.58%	218	1.59%
2016	4,778	33.12%	8,621	59.76%	1,028	7.13%
2020	4,771	30.07%	10,760	67.81%	336	2.12%
2024	5,046	33.74%	9,463	63.27%	447	2.99%

Since 1992, Dedham has shown a reliable lean towards the Democratic Party. Most recently in 2024, where Kamala Harris secured 63.27% of the votes in the 2024 presidential election, a slight decrease from 2020, where Joe Biden won 67.81% of the votes.

Prior to the 1960 election, Republicans generally outperformed Democrats, with Republicans achieving 66.23% of the votes in the 1956 presidential election.

Third-party candidates have historically gained a moderate amount of support, with exceptions such as in 1992 and 1980, where they received 22.38% and 15.91% of the votes respectively.

U.S. Senate election results
Year	Republican	Democratic	Twelve Visions	Libertarian	Constitution	Timesizing Not Downsizing	Conservative	Natural Law	LaRouche Was Right	Socialist Workers	U.S. Labor Party	Prohibition	Independent	Write-in votes
2020	4,902 (31.64%) Kevin J. O'Connor	10,504 (67.81%) Edward J. Markey											55 (0.36%) Shiva Ayyadurai	30 (0.19%)
2018	4,665 (38.19%) Geoff Diehl	7,157 (58.60%) Elizabeth A. Warren											378 (3.09%) Shiva Ayyadurai	14 (0.11%)
2014	3,624 (38.80%) Brian J. Herr	5,706 (61.09%) Edward J. Markey												10 (0.10%)
2013	2,846 (49.26%) Gabriel E. Gomez	2,885 (49.93%) Edward J. Markey	26 (0.45%) Richard A. Heos											21 (0.36%)
2012	6,951 (50.82%) Scott P. Brown	6,715 (49.09%) Elizabeth A. Warren												12 (0.09%)
2010	5,979 (55.47%) Scott P. Brown	4,647 (43.11%) Martha Coakley											147 (1.36%) Joseph L. Kennedy	6 (0.06%)
2008	4,326 (34.93%) Jeffrey K. Beatty	7,707 (62.22%) John F. Kerry		342 (2.76%) Robert J. Underwood										11 (0.09%)
2006	3,048 (31.59%) Kenneth G. Chase	6,587 (68.27%) Edward M. Kennedy												14 (0.15%)
2002		7,522 (79.88%) John F. Kerry		1,791 (19.02%) Michael E. Cloud									67 (0.71%) Randall Forsberg	37 (0.39%)
2000	1,295 (11.24%) Jack E. Robinson, III	8,277 (71.89%) Edward M. Kennedy		1,457 (12.65%) Carla A. Howell	409 (3.55%) Philip F. Lawler	35 (0.30%) Philip Hyde, III							39 (0.34%) Dale E. Friedgen	5 (0.04%)
1996	5,173 (45.26%) William F. Weld	5,757 (50.37%) John F. Kerry					472 (4.13%) Susan C. Gallagher	28 (0.24%) Robert C. Stowe						
1994	4,498 (43.06%) W. Mitt Romney	5,858 (56.08%) Edward M. Kennedy		65 (0.62%) Lauraleigh Dozier					25 (0.24%) William A. Ferguson Jr.					
1990	4,905 (42.21%) Jim Rappaport	6,715 (57.79%) John F. Kerry												
1988	5,221 (40.52%) Joseph D Malone	7,553 (58.62%) Edward M. Kennedy											64 (0.50%) Mary Fridley	22 (0.17%) Freda Lee Nason
1984	6,621 (51.79%) Raymond Shamie	6,159 (48.18%) John F. Kerry												4 (0.03%)
1982	4,692 (41.48%) Ray Shamie	6,545 (57.86%) Edward M. Kennedy		72 (0.64%) Howard S. Katz										2 (0.02%)
1978	4,494 (40.82%) Edward Brooke	6,504 (59.07%) Paul E. Tsongas												11 (0.10%)
1976	4,728 (36.59%) Michael S. Robertson	7,932 (61.39%) Edward M. Kennedy								134 (1.04%) Carol Henderson Evans	126 (0.98%) H. Graham Lowry			
1972	7,748 (58.25%) Edward Brooke	5,417 (40.73%) John J. Droney								135 (1.01%) Donald Gurewitz				1 (0.01%)
1970	4,311 (38.50%) Josiah A. Spaulding	6,807 (60.80%) Edward M. Kennedy								25 (0.22%) Lawrence Gilfedder		47 (0.42%) Mark R. Shaw		6 (0.05%)

U.S. House election results
Year	District	Republican	Democratic	Conservative	Socialist Workers	Unenrolled	Write-in votes
2020	8		11,626 (82.21%) Stephen Lynch			2,420 (17.11%) Jonathan D. Lott	96 (0.68%)
2018	8		9,721 (98.61%) Stephen Lynch				137 (1.39%)
2016	8	3,379 (24.46%) William Burke	10,414 (75.37%) Stephen Lynch				24 (0.17%)
2014	8		7,371 (98.44%) Stephen Lynch				117 (1.56%)
2012	8	2,949 (23.01%) Joe Selvaggi	9,844 (76.81%) Stephen Lynch				23 (0.18%)
2010	9	2,474 (24.95%) Vernon M. Harrison	6,616 (66.73%) Stephen Lynch			810 (8.17%) Philip Dunklebarger	14 (0.14%)
2008	9		9,609 (98.74%) Stephen Lynch				123 (1.26%)
2006	9	2,474 (26.41%) Jack E. Robinson III	7,407 (79.08%) Stephen Lynch				20 (0.21%)
2004	9		8,957 (100.00%) Stephen Lynch				
2002	9		7,434 (98.88%) Stephen Lynch				84 (1.12%)
2001	9	1,132 (32.84%) Jo Ann Sprague	2,266 (65.74%) Stephen Lynch	33 (0.99%) Susan Gallagher C. Long	16 (0.48%) Brock R. Satter		
2000	9	2,775 (24.18%) Janet E. Jeghelian	8,454 (73.65%) Joe Moakley			242 (2.11%) David A. Rosa	7 (0.06%)
1998	9		7,029 (98.96%) Joe Moakley				74 (1.04%)
1996	9	3,952 (35.55%) Paul V. Gryska	7,165 (64.45%) Joe Moakley				
1994	9	3,147 (31.40%) Michael M. Murphy	6,874 (68.60%) Joe Moakley				
1992	9	2,647 (21.76%) Martin D. Conboy	8,437 (69.34%) Joe Moakley			663 (5.45%) Lawrence C. Mackin	420 (3.45%) Robert W. Horan
1990	9		7,799 (68.67%) Joe Moakley			3,556 (31.31%) Robert W. Horan	2 (0.02%)
1988	9		10,200 (99.99%) Joe Moakley				1 (0.02%)
1986	9		7,001 (83.10%) Joe Moakley			1,423 (16.89%) Robert W. Horan	1 (0.01%)
1984	9		10,166 (99.86%) Joe Moakley				14 (0.14%)

Gubernatorial election results
Year	Republican	Democratic	United Independent	Unenrolled	Unenrolled	Green-Rainbow	Write-in votes
2018	8,264 (68.76%) Baker and Polito	3,711 (30.88%) Gonzalez and Palfrey					43 (0.36%)
2014	5,107 (52.09%) Baker and Polito	4,299 (43.84%) Coakley and Kerrigan	270 (2.75%) Falchuk and Jennings	66 (0.67%) Lively and Saunders	53 (0.54%) McCormick and Post		10 (0.10%)
2010	4,674 (45.18%) Baker and Tisei	4,513 (43.62%) Patrick and Murray		1,032 (9.98%) Cahill and Losocco		113 (1.09%) Stein and Purcell	13 (0.10%)
2006	4,111 (41.39%) Healey and Hillman	4,874 (49.07%) Patrick and Murray		736 (7.41%) Mihos and Sullivan		197 (1.98%) Ross and Robinson	14 (0.14%)

== Television and film ==
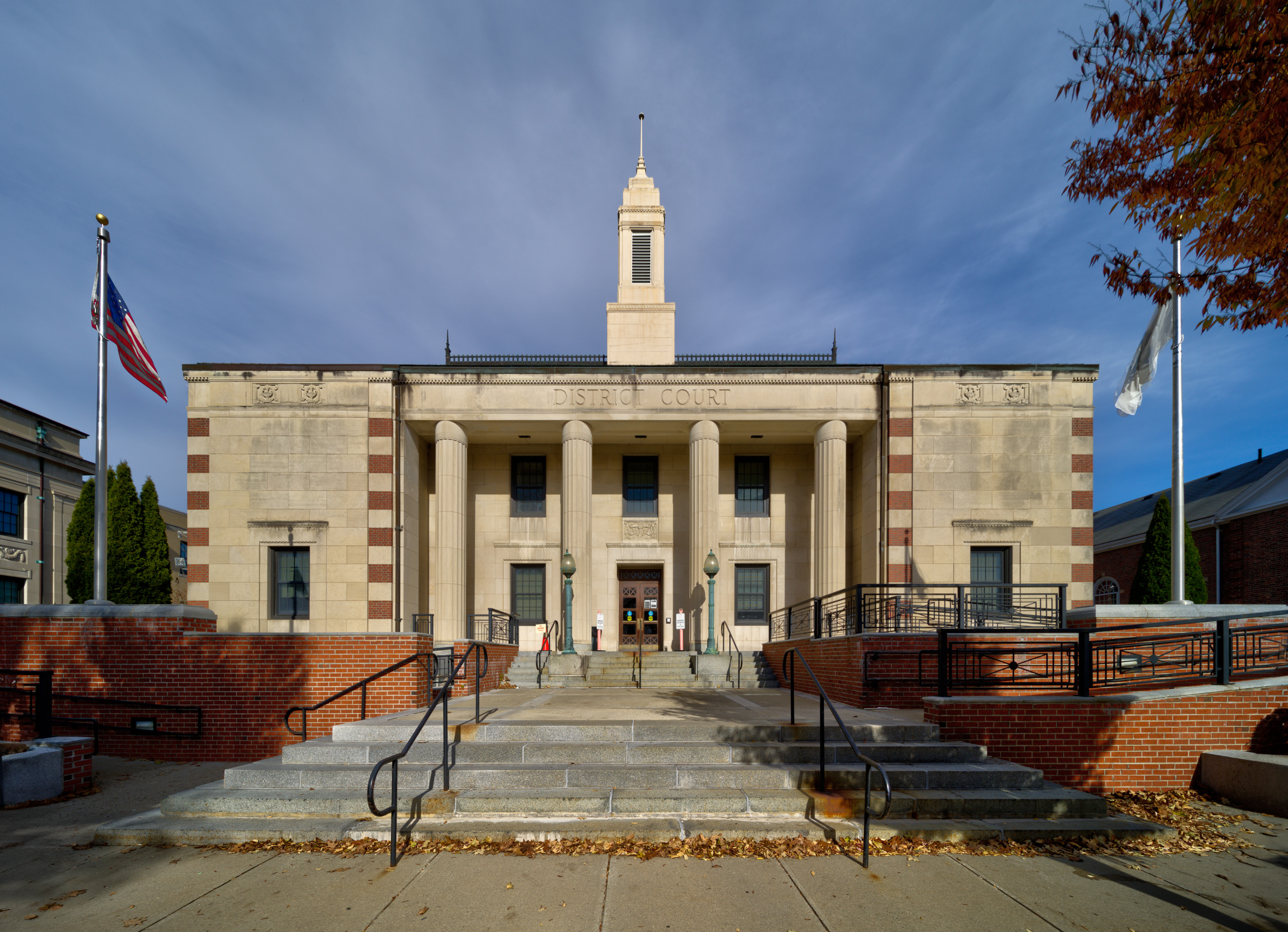
Dedham District Court

Dedham has been featured on both television and film screens.

- William Desmond Taylor's 1919 silent film Anne of Green Gables was filmed in Dedham. It was the favorite role of star Mary Miles Minter, but no copies of the film are known to have survived. The film also starred Paul Kelly.
- The 1973 film The Friends of Eddie Coyle was partially filmed in Dedham and starred Robert Mitchum, Peter Boyle, and Alex Rocco.
- In the 1980s, the Endicott Estate was featured in an episode of Spenser: For Hire.
- The 1982 film Pieces was filmed mainly in Madrid, but also included the same Dedham Square robbed in 'Eddie Coyle'.
- The Endicott Estate was also featured in the 2000 film The Perfect Storm.
- The award-winning 2000 film State and Main was filmed in Dedham, and Alec Baldwin's character slept in the Endicott Estate.
- In a 2004 episode of The Practice, viewers learned that Alan Shore grew up in the town, and numerous references to the Sacco and Vanzetti trial were also made. Images of Dedham Square, the Dedham Historical Society building and the courthouses were shot on location. In addition, "extremely rare" interior and exterior photos of the courthouses from the turn of the 20th century were shown.
- The 2010 thriller Shutter Island was partially filmed in Dedham.
- The 2014 film The Judge was filmed partly in Dedham Square.
- Kathryn Bigelow's 2017 film, Detroit, utilized the Dedham District Court as a filming location.
- The film I Care a Lot was filmed at the Norfolk County Courthouse and Norfolk County Registry of Deeds.

== Infrastructure ==
=== Roads ===
There are over 550 named streets in Dedham, and it continues to grow. Street names are assigned by the Select Board. There are 16 different street suffixes in use. The longest street is High Street, with 3.5 miles in Dedham, (Note: High Street is about 7 miles from its start in East Dedham Square to its end in Westwood. Washington Street has 2.6 miles in Dedham, but is 27 miles from Boston to Walpole.) and the shortest is a tie between Kings Court and Redwood Court, both about 60 feet long.

The first street in Dedham to be laid out with house lots on either side, as opposed to simply being a road to connect one farm to another, was Church Street. (Note: It was known at the time as New Street.) It was laid out by Rev. William Montague from the Colburn Grant. Norfolk Street was next, followed by School street. (Note: Norfolk Street was originally known as Cross Street, and School Street was originally Back Street.)

In the 1800s, West Street turned south at what is today Burgess Lane and continued to Westfield Street. After Route 128 was built, it severed several roads in the area. That portion of West Street became Burgess Lane in the north and Schoolmaster Lane in the south. The portion of Westfield Street west of the highway became known as Country Club Road, named for the Dedham Country and Polo Club.

Many streets were named for famous Dedhamites:

- Ames Street was named for the members of the Ames family, including Nathaniel Ames and his sons Fisher and Nathaniel, and his wife Deborah.
- Barrows Street is named for Thomas Barrows.
- Bates Court is named for Joshua Bates.
- Burgess Lane is named for Ebenezer Burgess.
- Bussey Street is named for Benjamin Bussey.
- Chickering Road is named for Hannah Chickering.
- Dexter Street was named for Rev. Samuel Dexter.
- Fairbanks Road is named for the Fairbanks family, beginning with Jonathan Fairbanks.
- Haven Street is named for Jason Haven and his son, Samuel.
- Marsh Street is named for Martin Marsh.
- Martin Bates Street is named for Martin Bates. It had previously been known as Bates Street but, when the 9-1-1 service was introduced in the 1990s, it was changed to Martin Bates Street to avoid confusion with Bates Court.
- Richards Street is named for Edward Richards.
- Schoolmaster Lane is named for the teachers of the Burgess School, previously known as District Number 11 and the Westfield School, which was located on Westfield Street near Schoolmaster Lane.
- Shuttleworth Place is named for Hannah Shuttleworth. It was created when a property was subdivided and two homes were put on it. The former driveway became a named road. The former owner, Dr. Louis Sawan, was instrumental in getting it named in Shuttleworth's honor.
- Whiting Ave was named for the Whiting family, which began with Nathaniel Whiting. In 1871, William Whiting sold what was left of the family farm, which became Oakdale.

=== Public transportation ===
Commuter rail service from Boston's South Station is provided by the MBTA with stops at Endicott and Dedham Corporate Center on its Franklin/Foxboro Line. Also, MBTA bus routes 34 Dedham Square to Forest Hills serves Washington Street, Dedham Square, and the Dedham Mall, route 34E Walpole Center to Forest Hills serves Washington Street and Dedham Square, and route 35 Dedham Mall to Forest Hills serves Washington Street and the Dedham Mall.

=== Police and Fire ===
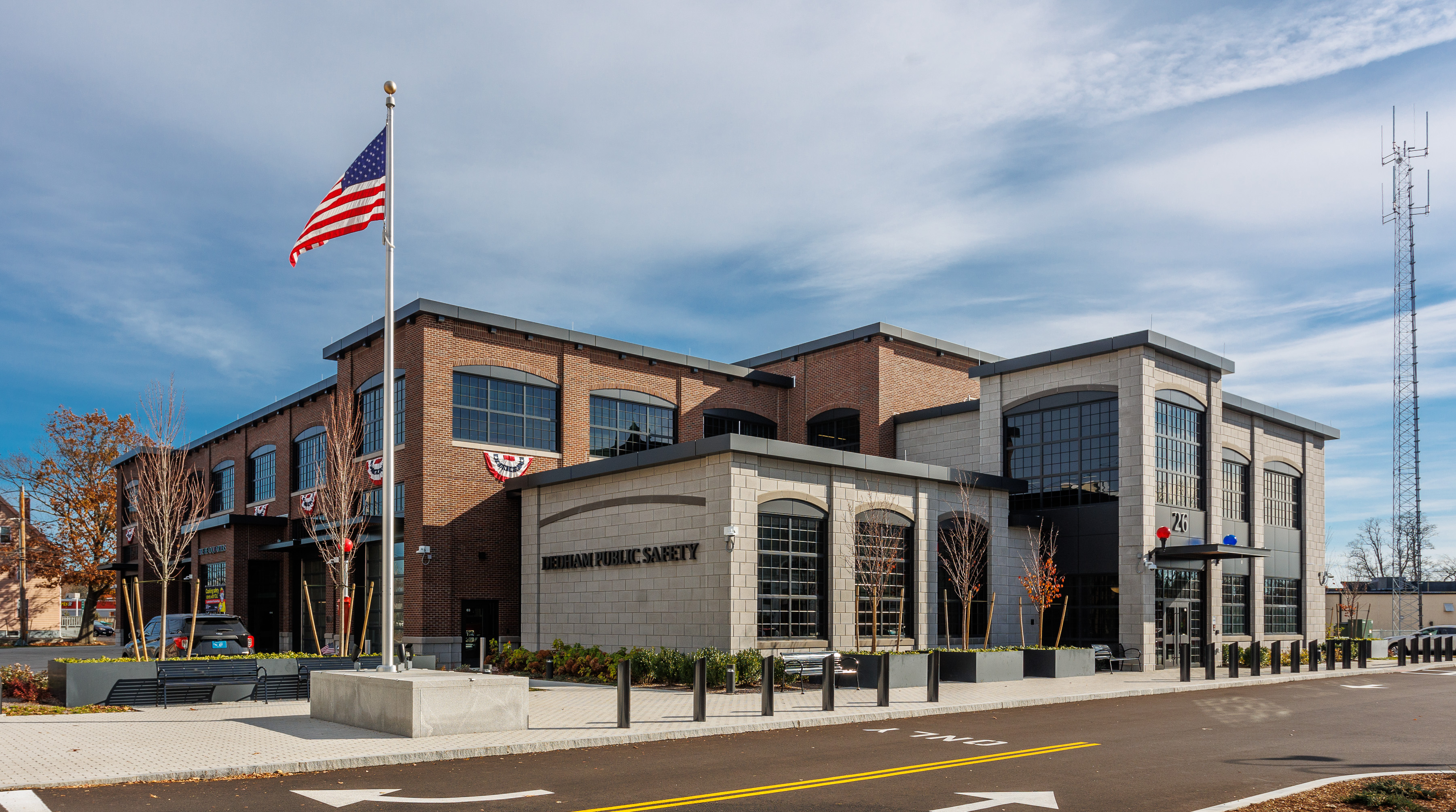
Public Safety complex

In March 2023, Dedham opened an 84,000 square-foot public safety complex on the site of the former Town Hall at 26 Bryant Street. The complex combines the equipment and personnel of the town's fire, police, and dispatch departments. This building replaced the previous police station at 600 High Street (built 1962) and fire station at 436 Washington Street (built 1952).

== Education ==
=== Public education ===
The Dedham Public Schools operates seven schools and is known for the first implementation of a tax supported, free public school system, now used nationally.

- Dedham High School
- Dedham Middle School
- Avery Elementary School
- Oakdale Elementary School
- Greenlodge Elementary School
- Riverdale Elementary School
- Dr. Thomas J. Curren Early Childhood Education Center

=== Private education ===
In addition, there are several private schools in the town, including:

- Noble and Greenough School, a private, co-educational day and boarding school for students in grades 7–12
- Dedham Country Day School, a private, co-educational, day school for students in pre-kindergarten to eighth grade
- Ursuline Academy, an independent college preparatory day school for young women in grades 7–12.
- The Rashi School, a Reform Jewish elementary and middle school.
- Little Sprouts Early Education and Childcare, a preschool and kindergarten.
- Regina Caeli Academy, based at St. Mary's Church.

=== Former schools ===
- Ames School, a former public elementary school named after distinguished Dedham resident Fisher Ames.
- Charles J. Capen School, operated from 1931 to 1981.
- St. Mary of the Assumption School, a former Catholic elementary school that operated as a part of St. Mary of the Assumption Parish until 1975.
- The Quincy School, a former public elementary school that operated until 1982.
- The Dexter School, a former public elementary school now operating as a private preschool and kindergarten, Little Sprouts Early Education and Childcare, Dedham location.

=== Higher education ===
- Queen of Apostles Seminary, a former Catholic minor seminary run by the Society of African Missions, closed in the late 1960s
- Northeastern University Dedham Campus, a satellite campus located in the Queen of Apostles Seminary's former building

== Places of worship ==
Churches in Dedham

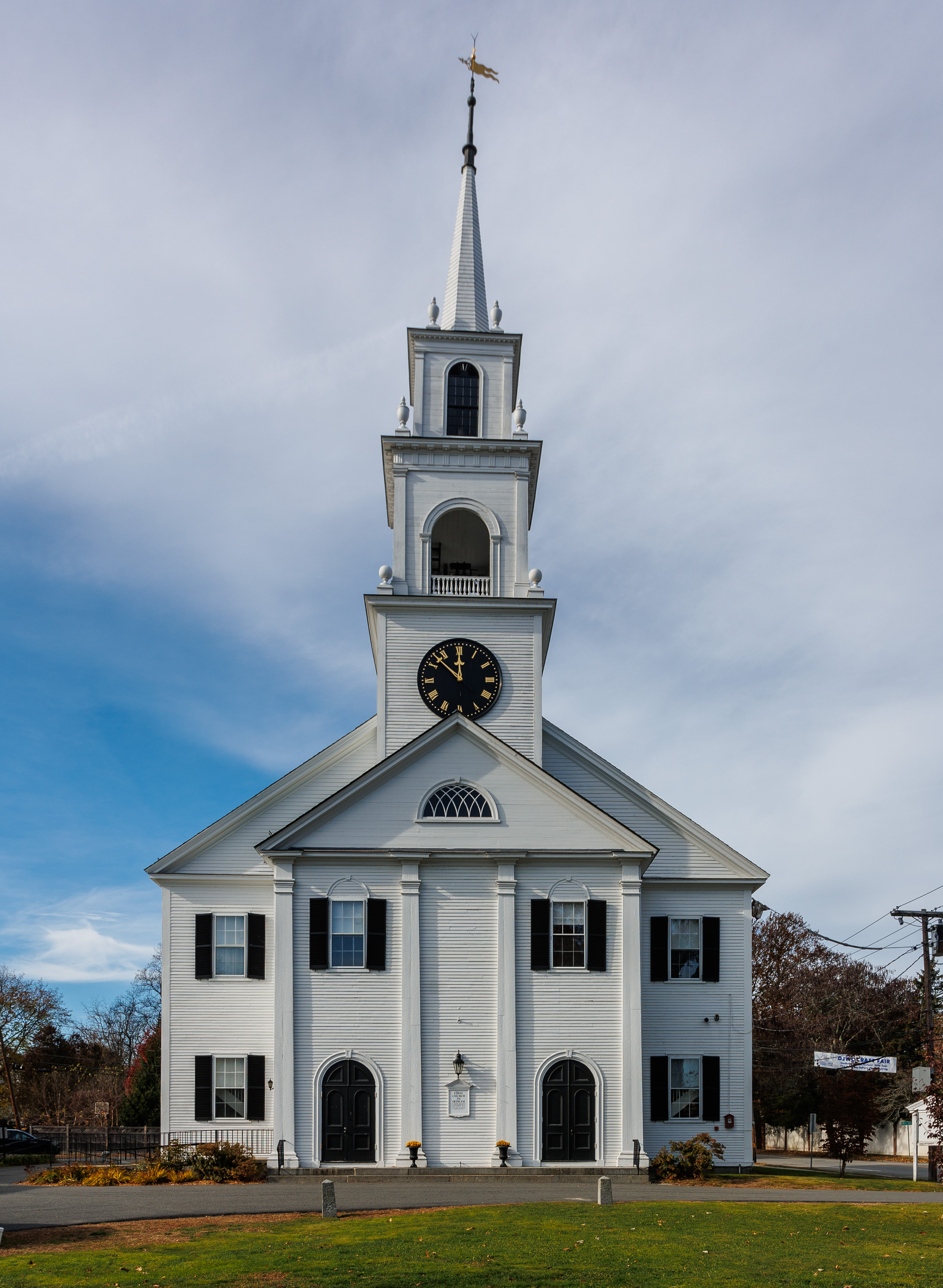
First Church and Parish

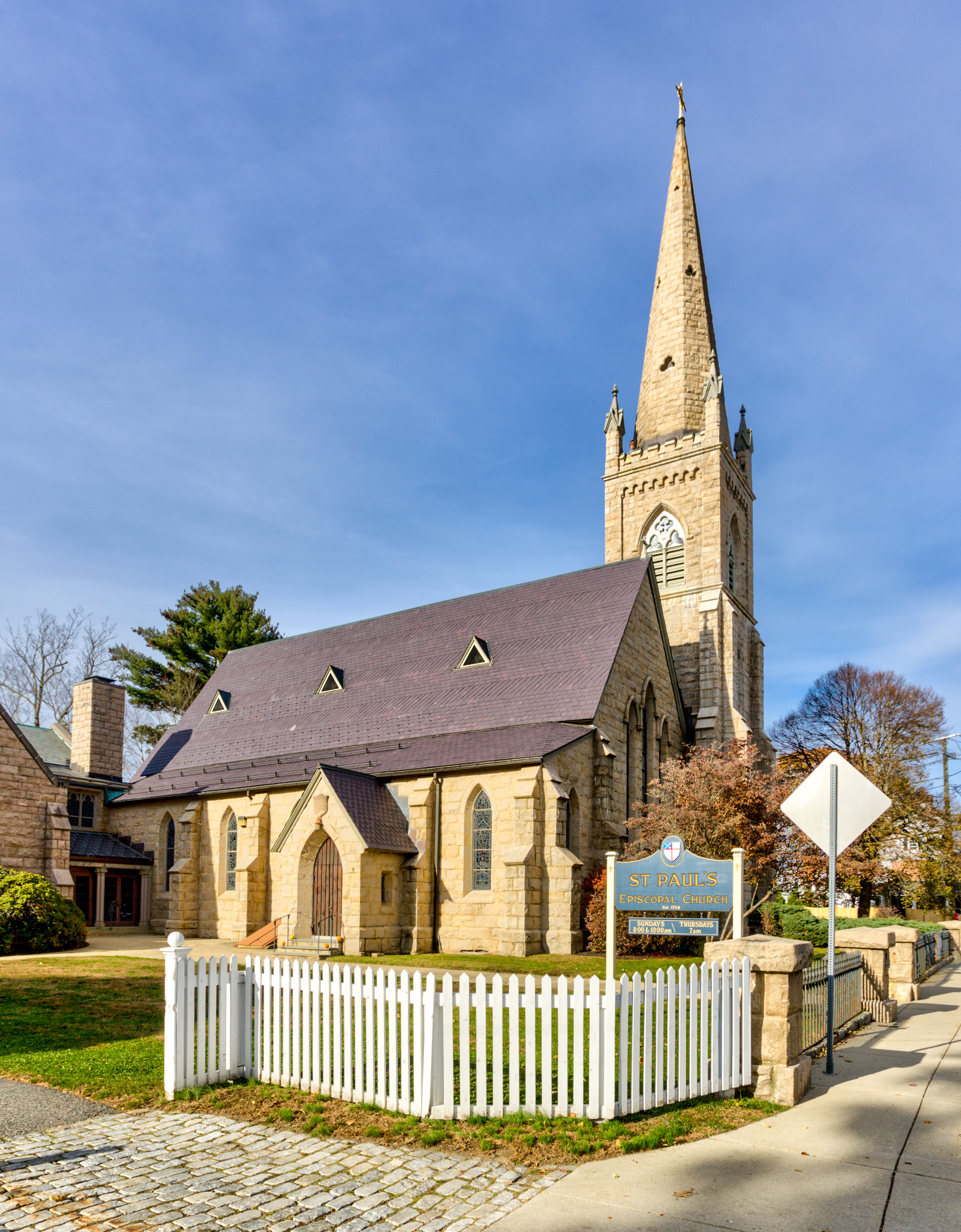
St. Paul's Episcopal

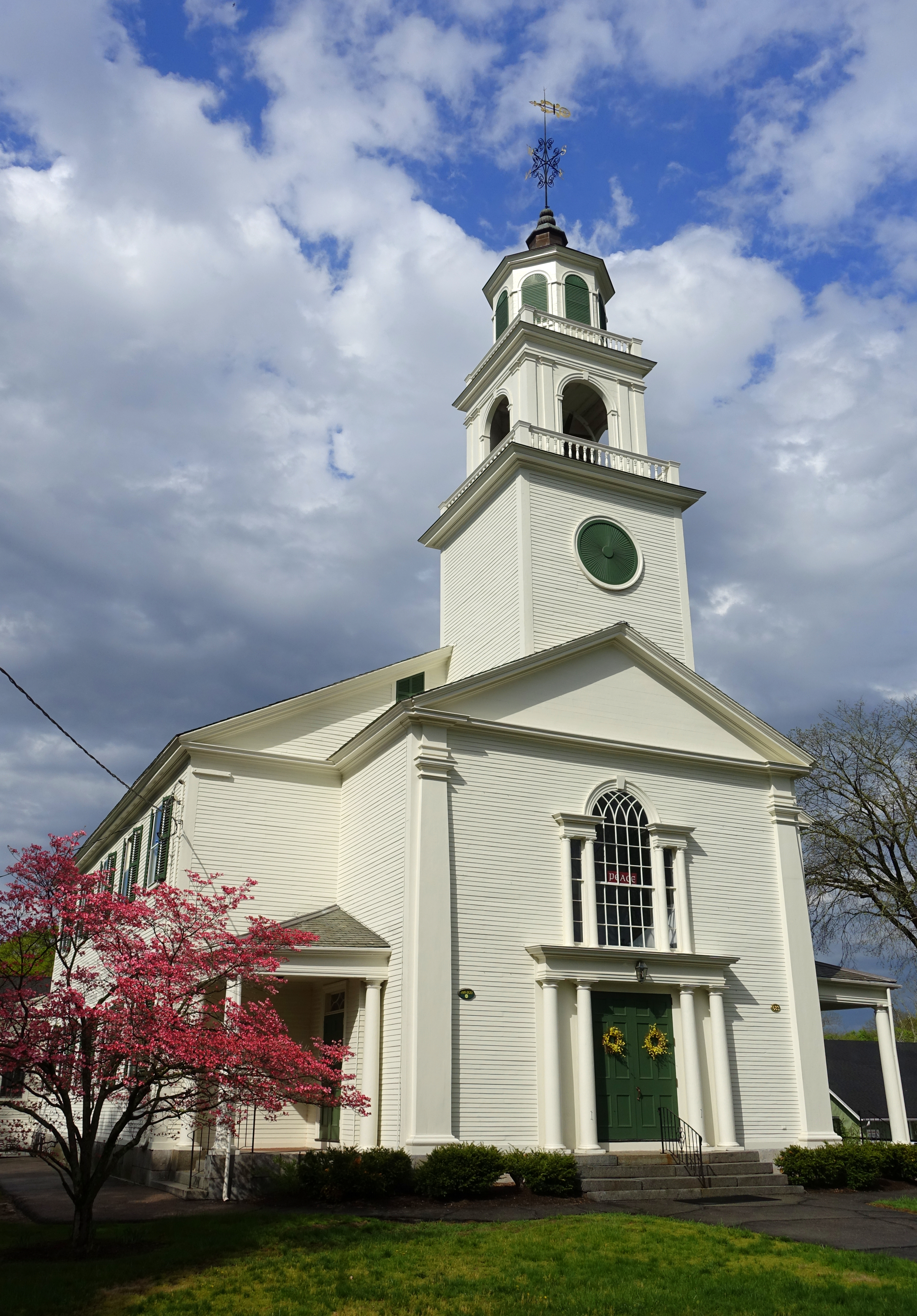
Allin Congregational

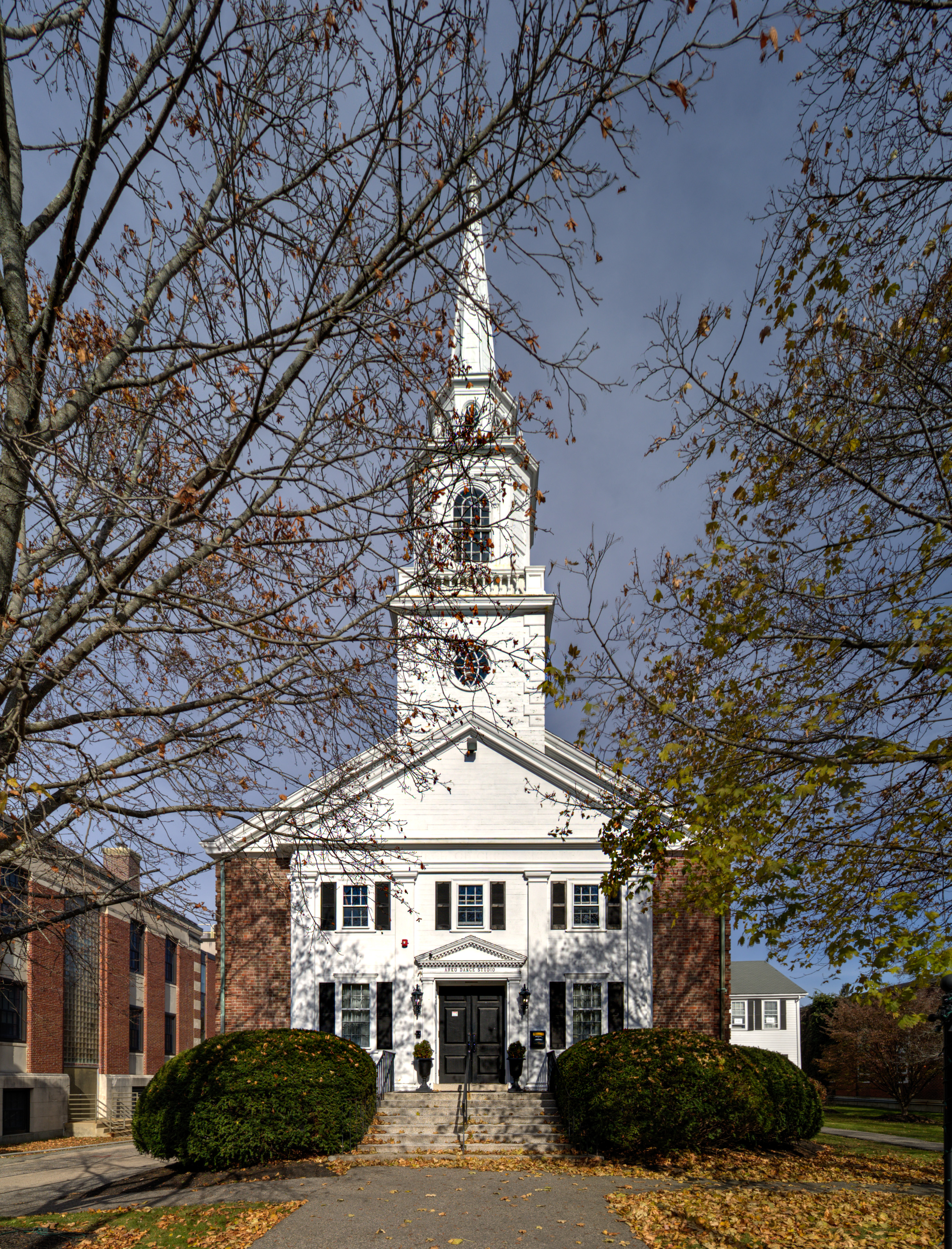
Former First Church of Christ, Scientist

Place of worship	Denomination	Size	Founded
First Church and Parish in Dedham	Unitarian Universalist		1638 (Split in 1818)
Allin Congregational Church	United Church of Christ		1638 (Split in 1818)
St. Paul's Episcopal Church	The Episcopal Church		1758
Fellowship Bible Church	Nondenominational prev. Baptist		1843
St. Mary of the Assumption Church	Roman Catholic	2,329 families	1866
Church of the Good Shepherd	The Episcopal Church		1877
St. Luke's Lutheran Church	Evangelical Lutheran Church in America		1893
St. John of Damascus Church	Eastern Orthodox Church		1907
St. Susanna Church	Roman Catholic		1960
Calvary Baptist Church	Independent Baptist		
Dedham Temple	Seventh-day Adventist		

Former places of worship
Place of worship	Denomination	Founded	Closed
First Church of Christ, Scientist	Church of Christ, Scientist	1939	2000s
St. Raphael's	Roman Catholic	1878	1887
The Link Church	Assemblies of God		Moved to Canton

== Points of interest ==
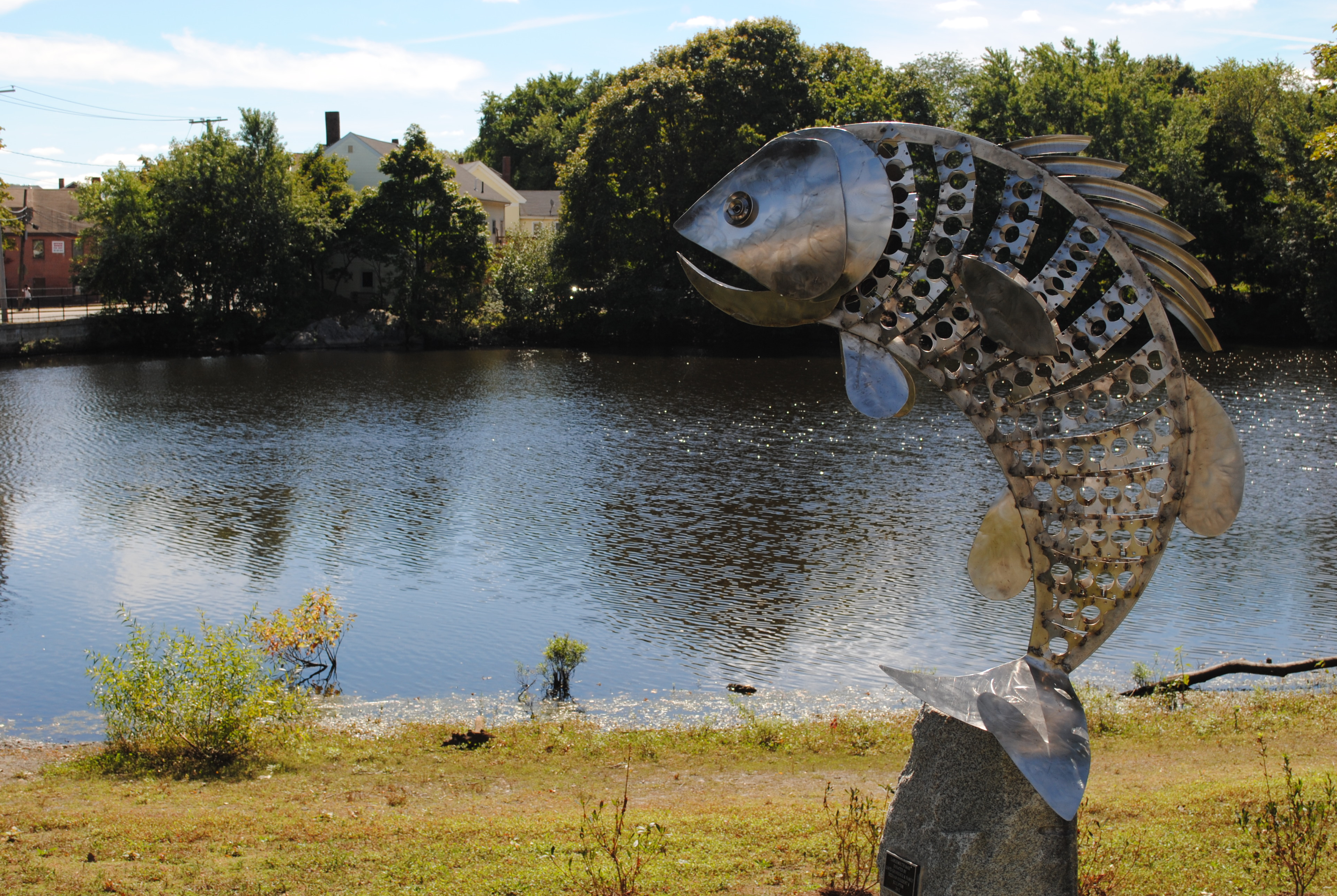
Mill Pond Park

- Organizations
  - Dedham Historical Society and Museum
  - Dedham Public Library
  - Christmas light display at the Civitarese-Cushman House
- Businesses
  - Dedham Health and Athletic Complex
  - Legacy Place, outdoor shopping center.
  - Moseley's on the Charles, the oldest continuous-running ballroom in the country
- Historic Districts

Three districts have been recognized for their historic and architectural significance:

  - Dedham Village Historic District
  - Connecticut Corner District
  - Federal Hill District
- Buildings
  - 19 Court Street, a building with several uses over several centuries
  - 369 Washington Street, the Knights of Columbus building
  - 601-603 High Street, a commercial building in Dedham Square
  - 848 High Street, the childhood home of David Hackett, and the inspiration for Phinneas' house in A Separate Peace. (Note: Knowles describes the house as being "on a street with a nave of ancient elms branching over it. The house itself was high, white, and oddly proper to be the home of Phineas. It presented a face of definite elegance to the street, although behind that wings and ells dwindled quickly in formality until the house ended in a big plain barn.")
  - East Dedham Firehouse, possibly the oldest wood framed firehouse in use in the United States. Originally built in 1855, it was designed with stables in the basement for the horses that carried the apparatus.
  - Ames Schoolhouse, schoolhouse built in 1897, now the Dedham town hall and senior center
  - Endicott Estate
  - Dedham Mall, former enclosed shopping mall that currently operates as an open-air power center
  - Fairbanks House
  - MIT Endicott House
  - Norfolk County Correctional Center, situated in the median of Route 128.
  - Old Norfolk County Jail
- Cemeteries
  - Baby Cemetery
  - Brookdale Cemetery
  - Fairview Cemetery
  - Old Village Cemetery
  - Boston United Hand in Hand Cemetery is located on Lower East Street straddling the West Roxbury line. Dating back to 1875, the original plot was full by 1896 but subsequently expanded a number of times. There are graves as recent as 1980 in the West Roxbury portion; the Dedham portion is still active. Brookline's Congregation Mishkan Tefila currently owns the property.

== Notable people ==
=== Arts and literature ===
- Louisa May Alcott, author of Little Women
- Arthur Foote, organist-composer
- Tim Costello (1945–2009), labor and anti-globalization advocate and author
- Jacques d'Amboise, ballet dancer and choreographer
- George Derby, humorist
- Alvan Fisher, artist
- Reuben Guild, librarian and author
- Lilian Westcott Hale, artist
- Connie Hines, television actress
- Peter H. Reynolds, children's author and illustrator
- Anita Shreve, author
- Richard Trethewey, plumber on This Old House

=== Government ===
==== Federal ====
- Fisher Ames, U.S. Representative
- Louis Brandeis, Associate Justice of the Supreme Court of the United States
- LeBaron Bradford Colt, U.S. Senator
- William S. Damrell, Know Nothing U.S. Representative who served two terms and died in Dedham and whose Dedham estate formed part of Fairview Cemetery
- Samuel Dexter, U.S. Representative, Secretary of War, Secretary of the Treasury, administered oath of office to Chief Justice John Marshall
- Frederick D. Ely, U.S. Representative
- David Hackett, head of President's Committee on Juvenile Delinquency and Youth Crime, inspiration for Phineas in A Separate Peace
- John William McCormack, Speaker of U.S. House of Representatives
- John Lothrop Motley, historian, Minister to Great Britain, Minister to Austrian Empire
- Frederick J. Stimson, Ambassador to Argentina (1914–1921), Assistant Attorney General of Massachusetts
- George F. Williams, U.S. Representative, Ambassador to Greece and Montenegro, known as "sage of Dedham"

==== State ====
- Deborah R. Cochran, Representative to the Great and General Court
- Waldo Colburn (1824–1885), Massachusetts State Representative, Massachusetts State Supreme Court Justice
- Samuel Haven (1771–1847), Chief justice of the Court of Common Pleas
- Maryanne Lewis, Representative to the Great and General Court
- Horace Mann, education reformer and abolitionist
- Theron Metcalf, Associate justice, Massachusetts Supreme Judicial Court
- Charles M. McGowan, businessman and Representative to the Great and General Court
- Paul McMurtry, Representative to the Great and General Court
- Betty Jo Nelsen, member of the Wisconsin State Assembly
- James Richardson (1771–1858), member of the Massachusetts Senate
- Mason Sears (1899–1973), Representative to the Great and General Court and chairman of the Massachusetts Republican Party
- William Z. Stuart (1811–1876), Indiana Supreme Court justice

=== Military ===
- John Andrew Barnes, III, war hero, Medal of Honor recipient
- Ebenezer Battelle, Revolutionary War veteran
- Leon A. Edney, former Supreme Allied Commander, NATO Atlantic Forces, United States Atlantic Command, Commodore Admiral, US Navy
- William B. Gould, former enslaved Union Navy sailor
- James William Augustus Nicholson, Rear Admiral, U.S. Navy
- Thomas Sherwin, General in the Civil War
- Stephen Minot Weld Jr., Civil War hero

=== Religious ===
- Eliphalet Adams (1677–1753), clergyman and missionary to the Native Americans
- John Allin, patriarch of New England and signatory to the Dedham Covenant
- Charles A. Finn, oldest Catholic priest in the United States

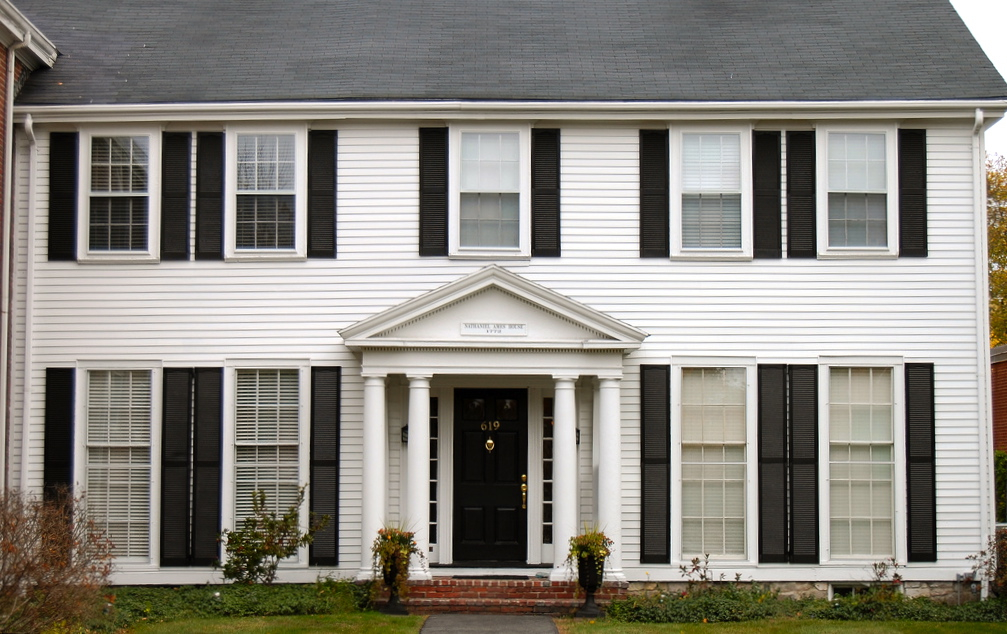
Nathaniel Ames House

=== Sports ===
- Buck Danner, infielder for the Philadelphia Athletics
- Pete Hamilton, NASCAR driver
- Bill Hunnefield, infielder for Chicago White Sox (1926–1930), Cleveland Indians (1931), Boston Braves (1931) and New York Giants (1931)
- John Frederick Kiley, outfielder for the Washington Nationals (1884) and Boston Beaneaters (1891)
- Lefty Mills, early American one-armed baseball player
- Sarah Parsons, member of the 2006 Winter Olympics women's hockey team
- Freddy Roach, professional boxer
- Warren Cummings Smith, alpine skier in the 2014 Winter Olympics men's giant slalom and slalom

=== Miscellaneous ===
- Weaver W. Adams, chess master
- Nathaniel Ames, almanac-maker and physician
- Faxon Atherton, businessman and namesake of Atherton, California
- Jason Fairbanks, murderer
- Jonathan Fairbanks, builder of the Fairbanks House
- Temple Grandin, professor of animal science, inventor and autism advocate
- Samuel Foster Haven, archaeologist and anthropologist
- Eli Sagan (1927–2015), clothing manufacturer, lecturer and author in cultural anthropology and political activist who served on the national finance committee for George McGovern's 1972 presidential campaign, a role that earned him a spot on Richard Nixon's Enemies List in 1973
- Royal O. Storrs (1815–1888), businessman, banker, and owner of the Merchant's Woolen Mill
- Tommy Vietor, National Security Council spokesperson, podcast host of Pod Save America

== See also ==
- Dedham Fire Department
- The Society in Dedham for Apprehending Horse Thieves

== Works cited ==
- Curtis, Michael Kent (2000). Free speech, "the people's darling privilege": struggles for freedom of expression in American history. Duke University Press. p. 88. ISBN 978-0-8223-2529-1.
- Dedham Historical Society (2001). Images of America: Dedham. Arcadia Publishing. ISBN 978-0-7385-0944-0.
- Hanson, Robert Brand (1976). Dedham, Massachusetts, 1635-1890. Dedham Historical Society.
- Knudsen, Harold M. (2025). Fisher Ames, Christian Founding Father & Federalist. Liberty Hill Publishing.
- Lockridge, Kenneth (1985). A New England Town. New York: W.W. Norton & Company. ISBN 978-0-393-95459-3.
- Massachusetts Board of Library Commissioners (1899). Report of the Free Public Library Commission of Massachusetts.
- Morse, Abner (1861). A Genealogical Register of the Descendants of Several Ancient Puritans, V. 3: The Richards Family. H.W. Dutton.
- Neiswander, Judith (2024). Mother Brook and the Mills of East Dedham. Damianos Publishing. ISBN 978-1-941573-66-2.
- Parr, James L. (2009). Dedham: Historic and Heroic Tales From Shiretown. The History Press. ISBN 978-1-59629-750-0.
- Stone, Geoffrey R. (2004). Perilous times: free speech in wartime from the Sedition Act of 1798 to the war on terrorism. W. W. Norton & Company. p. 64. ISBN 978-0-393-05880-2.
- Simon, James F. (2003). What Kind of Nation: Thomas Jefferson, John Marshall, and the Epic Struggle to Create a United States. Simon and Schuster. p. 55. ISBN 978-0-684-84871-6.
- Tise, Larry E. (1998). The American counterrevolution: a retreat from liberty, 1783–1800. Stackpole Books. ISBN 978-0-8117-0100-6.
- Worthington, Erastus (1827). The history of Dedham: from the beginning of its settlement, in September 1635, to May 1827. Dutton and Wentworth.
- Free Public Library Commission of Massachusetts (1908). Report of the Free Public Library Commission of Massachusetts. Secretary of the Commonwealth.
