= Benjamin Fairbanks =

American farmer convicted of sedition

Benjamin Fairbanks was an 18th-century farmer and selectmen from Dedham, Massachusetts who received the lightest sentence of anyone ever convicted under the Sedition Act of 1798.

Fairbanks was charged with having a role in erecting the liberty pole in Dedham, along with David Brown. Brown held the ladder while another, presumably Fairbanks, put up a seditious sign on it.

When it appeared, Fisher Ames and the rest of Dedham's Federalist community were enraged. The pole was taken down and the culprits were sought. Fairbanks, a prosperous farmer and former Selectman but also an "impressionable, rather excitable man," was quickly arrested on November 6, 1798. He was brought to Boston by the United States Marshal for the district, and accompanied by men from a neighboring community. He was questioned the same evening by Judge John Lowell.

He posted bond and was scheduled for trial the following June at the Federal Circuit Court in Boston. When the trial came, Fairbanks requested the legal aid of Ames. While Ames declined to serve as the defendant's attorney, he did appear as a character witness. Fairbanks, facing the "powerful forces" arrayed against him, confessed on June 8.

Fairbanks said that "it was not then known by me, nor perhaps by others concerned, how heinous an offense it was." He then added that he was a patriotic citizen, and would attempt to live his life accordingly in the future. Justice Samuel Chase sentenced Fairbanks to six hours in prison and a fine of five dollars, plus court costs, the lightest sentence ever given for any of the Sedition Act defendants. When Thomas Jefferson became president, one of his first acts was to issue a general pardon for any person convicted under the Sedition Act.

== Personal life ==
He was a descendant of Jonathan Fairebanke, builder of the Fairbanks House. He was also related to Jason Fairbanks, the murderer, and Vice President Charles Fairbanks.

He served one term as a selectman in 1785.

== See also ==
- List of people pardoned or granted clemency by the president of the United States

== Works cited ==
- Slack, Charles (2015). Liberty's First Crisis: Adams, Jefferson, and the Misfits Who Saved Free Speech. Atlantic Monthly Press. ISBN 978-0802123428.
