= List of executive actions by John F. Kennedy =

The president of the United States may take any of several kinds of executive actions.

Executive orders are issued to help officers and agencies of the executive branch manage the operations within the federal government itself. Presidential memoranda are closely related, and have the force of law on the Executive Branch, but are generally considered less prestigious. Presidential memoranda do not have an established process for issuance, and unlike executive orders, they are not numbered. A presidential determination results in an official policy or position of the executive branch of the United States government. A presidential proclamation is a statement issued by a president on a matter of public policy, under specific authority granted to the president by Congress, typically on a matter of widespread interest. Administrative orders are signed documents such as notices, letters, and orders, that can be issued to conduct administrative operations of the federal government. A presidential notice or a presidential sequestration order can also be issued.

Listed below are executive orders numbered 10914–11127 signed by United States President John F. Kennedy (1961–1963). He issued 214 executive orders. His executive orders are also listed on Wikisource, along with his presidential proclamations and national security action memorandums.

Signature of John F. Kennedy

== Executive orders ==
=== 1961 ===
Relative No.	Absolute No.	Title/Description	Date signed	Date published	FR citation	Ref.
1	10914	Providing for an Expanded Program of Food Distribution to Needy Families	January 21, 1961	January 24, 1961	26 FR 639	
2	10915	Amending Prior Executive Orders to Provide for the Responsibilities of the Director of the Food For Peace Program	January 24, 1961	January 26, 1961	26 FR 781	
3	10916	Inspection of income, estate, and gift tax returns by the Senate Committee on Government Operations	January 24, 1961	January 26, 1961	26 FR 781	
4	10917	Abolishing certain committees on Government organization and management improvement	February 10, 1961	February 14, 1961	26 FR 1239	
5	10918	Establishing the President's Advisory Committee on Labor-Management Policy	February 16, 1961	February 18, 1961	26 FR 1427	
6	10919	Creating an emergency board to investigate a dispute between the Pan American World Airways, Inc., and certain of its employees	February 17, 1961	February 21, 1961	26 FR 1463	
7	10920	Revoking Executive Order No. 10700 of February 25, 1957, as amended (Operations Coordinating Board)	February 18, 1961	February 21, 1961	26 FR 1463	
8	10921	Establishing a commission to inquire into a controversy between certain air carriers and certain of their employees	February 21, 1961	February 24, 1961	26 FR 1553	
9	10922	Amending Executive Order 10922 of February 21, 1961, establishing a commission to inquire into a controversy between certain air carriers and certain of their employees	February 23, 1961	February 25, 1961	26 FR 1655	
10	10923	Creating an Emergency Board to Investigate Disputes Between the Northwest Airlines, Inc., and Certain of its Employees	February 24, 1961	February 28, 1961	26 FR 1699	
11	10924	Establishment and administration of the Peace Corps in the Department of State	March 1, 1961	March 2, 1961	26 FR 1789	
12	10925	Establishing the President's Committee on Equal Employment Opportunity	March 6, 1961	March 8, 1961	26 FR 1977	
13	10926	Amending Executive Order No. 10919, February 17, 1961, to extend the time within which the board created therein, to investigate a dispute between Pan American World Airways, Inc., and certain of its employees, shall report its findings to the President	March 18, 1961	March 21, 1961	26 FR 2331	
14	10927	Abolishing the President's Committee on Fundraising Within the Federal Service and providing for the conduct of fundraising activities	March 18, 1961	March 22, 1961	26 FR 2383	
15	10928	Abolishing the Committee on Government Activities Affecting Prices and Costs	March 23, 1961	March 25, 1961	26 FR 2547	
16	10929	Establishing a commission to inquire into a controversy between certain carriers and certain of their employees	March 24, 1961	March 28, 1961	26 FR 2583	
17	10930	Abolishing the Government Patents Board and providing for the performance of its functions	March 24, 1961	March 28, 1961	26 FR 2583	
18	10931	Amendment of section 1 of Executive Order No. 10673, establishing the President's Council on Youth Fitness	March 29, 1961	?	26 FR 2677	
19	10932	Modifying the exterior boundaries of certain National Forests in Illinois, Michigan, Missouri, and Wisconsin	April 7, 1961	April 11, 1961	26 FR 3265	
20	10933	Amending Executive Order No. 10923, February 24, 1961, to extend the time within which the board created therein, to investigate disputes between Northwest Airlines, Inc., and certain of its employees, shall report its findings to the President	April 12, 1961	April 14, 1961	26 FR 3185	
21	10934	Establishing the Administrative Conference of the United States	April 13, 1961	April 15, 1961	26 FR 3233	
22	10935	Inspection of income, excess-profits, estate, and gift tax returns by the Committee on Un-American Activities, House of Representatives	April 22, 1961	April 25, 1961	26 FR 3507	
23	10936	Reports of identical bids	April 24, 1961	April 26, 1961	26 FR 3555	
24	10937	Amendment of Executive Order No. 10472, establishing the National Agricultural Advisory Commission	May 3, 1961	May 5, 1961	26 FR 3915	
25	10938	Establishing the President's Foreign Intelligence Advisory Board	May 4, 1961	May 6, 1961	26 FR 3951	
26	10939	To provide a guide on ethical standards to Government officials	May 5, 1961	May 6, 1961	26 FR 3951	
27	10940	Establishing the President's Committee on Juvenile Delinquency and Youth Crime	May 11, 1961	May 13, 1961	26 FR 4136	
28	10941	Designation of certain officers to act as Secretary of the Treasury	May 15, 1961	May 17, 1961	26 FR 4277	
29	10942	Amendment of Executive Order No. 10849, establishing a seal for the National Aeronautics and Space Administration	May 19, 1961	May 23, 1961	26 FR 4419	
30	10943	Designating the Coffee Study Group as a public international organization entitled to enjoy certain privileges, exemptions, and immunities	May 19, 1961	May 23, 1961	26 FR 4419	
31	10944	Creating an emergency board to investigate a dispute between the Baltimore and Ohio Railroad Company and other carriers and certain of their employees	May 19, 1961	May 23, 1961	26 FR 4419	
32	10945	Administration of the Export Control Act of 1949	May 24, 1961	May 25, 1961	26 FR 4487	
33	10946	Establishing a program for resolving labor disputes at missile and space sites	May 26, 1961	May 27, 1961	26 FR 4629	
34	10947	Inspection of income, excess-profits, estate, and gift tax returns by the House Committee on Public Works	June 12, 1961	June 14, 1961	26 FR 5323	
35	10948	Establishing a commission to inquire into a controversy between certain carriers represented by the New York Harbor Carriers' Conference Committee and certain of their employees	June 12, 1961	June 15, 1961	26 FR 5355	
36	10949	Creating a Board of Inquiry to report on a labor dispute affecting the maritime industry of the United States	June 26, 1961	June 28, 1961	26 FR 5731	
37	10950	Designating the Secretary of the Interior as the representative of the President to approve selections by the State of Alaska of public lands lying north and west of the National Defense Withdrawal Line	June 27, 1961	June 29, 1961	26 FR 5787	
38	10951	Amending Executive Order No. 10949, June 26, 1961, to extend the time within which the Board of Inquiry created therein, to inquire into the issues involved in a labor dispute affecting the maritime industry, shall report to the President	June 29, 1961	July 1, 1961	26 FR 5918	
39	10952	Assigning civil defense responsibilities to the Secretary of Defense and others	July 20, 1961	July 22, 1961	26 FR 6577	
40	10953	Creating an emergency board to investigate a dispute between the Southern Pacific Company (Pacific Lines) and certain of its employees	July 20, 1961	July 22, 1961	26 FR 6578	
41	10954	Amendment of Executive Order 10906, authorizing inspection of certain tax returns	July 26, 1961	July 28, 1961	26 FR 6759	
42	10955	Administration of assistance in the development of Latin America and in the reconstruction of Chile	July 31, 1961	August 3, 1961	26 FR 6967	
43	10956	Amendment of Executive Order No. 10841, relating to international cooperation under the Atomic Energy Act of 1954, as amended	August 10, 1961	August 12, 1961	26 FR 7315	
44	10957	Assigning authority with respect to ordering persons and units in the Ready Reserve to active duty and with respect to the extension of enlistments and other periods of service in the Armed Forces	August 10, 1961	August 15, 1961	26 FR 7541	
45	10958	Delegating functions with respect to civil defense stockpiles of medical supplies and equipment and food	August 14, 1961	August 16, 1961	26 FR 7571	
46	10959	Authorizing the appointment of Mr. Maurice L. Kowal to a competitive position without regard to the civil service rules and regulations	August 17, 1961	August 19, 1961	26 FR 7753	
47	10960	Amendment of Executive Order No. 10530, providing for the performance of certain functions vested in or subject to the approval of the President	August 21, 1961	August 23, 1961	26 FR 7823	
48	10961	Providing procedures for the award of the National Medal of Science	August 21, 1961	August 23, 1961	26 FR 7823	
49	10962	Inspection of tax returns by the Advisory Commission on Intergovernmental Relations	August 23, 1961	August 26, 1961	26 FR 8001	
50	10963	Creating an emergency board to investigate disputes between the Pullman Company and the Chicago, Milwaukee, St. Paul & Pacific Railroad Company and certain of their employees	September 1, 1961	September 6, 1961	26 FR 8373	
51	10964	Amendment to Executive Order 10501—Safeguarding official information in the interests of the defense of the United States	September 20, 1961	September 22, 1961	26 FR 8932	
52	10965	Creating an emergency board to investigate a dispute between the Trans World Airlines, Inc., and certain of its employees	October 5, 1961	October 7, 1961	26 FR 9451	
53	10966	Inspection of income, excess-profits, estate, and gift tax returns by the Committee on Government Operations, House of Representatives	October 10, 1961	October 13, 1961	26 FR 9667	
54	10967	Administration of Palmyra Island	October 10, 1961	October 13, 1961	26 FR 9667	
55	10968	Amendment of Executive Order No. 10858, relating to the President's Committee for Traffic Safety	October 10, 1961	October 13, 1961	26 FR 9667	
56	10969	Creating an emergency board to investigate a dispute between the Reading Company and certain of its employees	October 11, 1961	October 13, 1961	26 FR 9667	
57	10970	Delegating certain authority of the President to establish maximum per diem rates for Government personnel in travel status	October 27, 1961	October 31, 1961	26 FR 10149	
58	10971	Creating an emergency board to investigate a dispute between Trans World Airlines, Inc., and certain of its employees	November 1, 1961	November 3, 1961	26 FR 10335	
59	10972	Administration of the Agricultural Trade Development and Assistance Act of 1954, as amended	November 3, 1961	November 7, 1961	26 FR 10469	
60	10973	Administration of foreign assistance and related functions	November 3, 1961	November 7, 1961	26 FR 10469	
61	10974	Establishing the President's Commission on Campaign Costs	November 8, 1961	November 10, 1961	26 FR 10585	
62	10975	Creating an emergency board to investigate a dispute between Pan American World Airways, Inc., and certain of its employees	November 10, 1961	November 14, 1961	26 FR 10629	
63	10976	Suspension of the eight-hour law as to laborers and mechanics employed by the National Aeronautics and Space Administration	November 15, 1961	November 21, 1961	26 FR 10825	
64	10977	Establishing the Armed Forces Expeditionary Medal	December 4, 1961	December 5, 1961	26 FR 11471	
65	10978	Establishing Presidential awards for significant contributions to the export expansion program	December 5, 1961	December 7, 1961	26 FR 11714	
66	10979	Amendment of Executive Order No. 10717, establishing the President's Award for Distinguished Federal Civilian Service	December 12, 1961	December 14, 1961	26 FR 11937	
67	10980	Establishing the President's Commission on the Status of Women	December 14, 1961	December 16, 1961	26 FR 12059	
68	10981	Inspection of income, excess-profits, estate, and gift tax returns by the Senate Committee on the Judiciary	December 28, 1961	December 30, 1961	26 FR 12749	
69	10982	Administration of the Act of September 26, 1961, relating to evacuation payments, assignments, and allotments, and other matters	December 25, 1961	January 3, 1962	27 FR 3	
70	10983	Designating the Caribbean Organization as a public international organization entitled to enjoy certain privileges, exemptions, and immunities	December 30, 1961	January 4, 1962	27 FR 32	

=== 1962 ===
Relative No.	Absolute No.	Title/Description	Date signed	Date published	FR citation	Ref.
71	10984	Amending the Selective Service Regulations	January 5, 1962	January 9, 1962	27 FR 193	
72	10985	Amendment of Executive Order No. 10501, relating to safeguarding official information in the interests of the defense of the United States	January 12, 1962	January 16, 1962	27 FR 439	
73	10986	Amendment of Executive Order No. 10898, Establishing the Interdepartmental Highway Safety Board	January 12, 1962	January 16, 1962	27 FR 439	
74	10987	Agency systems for appeals from adverse actions	January 17, 1962	January 19, 1962	27 FR 550	
75	10988	Employee-management cooperation in the Federal service	January 17, 1962	January 19, 1962	27 FR 551	
76	10989	Amendment of Executive Order No. 10168, of October 11, 1950, as amended, prescribing regulations relating to the right of enlisted members of the uniformed services to additional pay for sea and foreign duty	January 22, 1962	January 25, 1962	27 FR 727	
77	10990	Reestablishing the Federal Safety Council	February 2, 1962	February 6, 1962	27 FR 1065	
78	10991	Making a change with respect to the membership of the Commission established by Executive Order No. 10929, relating to a controversy between certain carriers and certain of their employees	February 6, 1962	February 9, 1962	27 FR 1207	
79	10992	Redefining the boundaries of the Caribbean National Forest—Puerto Rico	February 9, 1962	February 13, 1962	27 FR 1311	
80	10993	Consolidating the Hiawatha and Marquette National Forests (Michigan) and correcting the land descriptions of Nebraska National Forest (Nebraska) and Wasatch National Forest (Utah)	February 9, 1962	February 13, 1962	27 FR 1312	
81	10994	The President's Committee on Employment of the Handicapped	February 14, 1962	February 16, 1962	27 FR 1447	
82	10995	Assigning telecommunications management functions	February 16, 1962	February 20, 1962	27 FR 1519	
83	10996	Promulgating regulations concerning withholding of compensation of civilian employees of the National Guard for State and State-sponsored employee retirement, disability, or death benefits programs	February 16, 1962	February 20, 1962	27 FR 1521	
84	10997	Assigning emergency preparedness functions to the Secretary of the Interior	February 16, 1962	February 20, 1962	27 FR 1522	
85	10998	Assigning emergency preparedness functions to the Secretary of Agriculture	February 16, 1962	February 20, 1962	27 FR 1524	
86	10999	Assigning emergency preparedness functions to the Secretary of Commerce	February 16, 1962	February 20, 1962	27 FR 1527	
87	11000	Assigning emergency preparedness functions to the Secretary of Labor	February 16, 1962	February 20, 1962	27 FR 1532	
88	11001	Assigning emergency preparedness functions to the Secretary of Health, Education, and Welfare	February 16, 1962	February 20, 1962	27 FR 1534	
89	11002	Assigning emergency preparedness functions to the Postmaster General	February 16, 1962	February 20, 1962	27 FR 1539	
90	11003	Assigning emergency preparedness functions to the Administrator of the Federal Aviation Agency	February 16, 1962	February 20, 1962	27 FR 1540	
91	11004	Assigning certain emergency preparedness functions to the Housing and Home Finance Administrator	February 16, 1962	February 20, 1962	27 FR 1542	
92	11005	Assigning emergency preparedness functions to the Interstate Commerce Commission	February 16, 1962	February 20, 1962	27 FR 1544	
93	11006	Creating an emergency board to investigate a dispute between Eastern Air Lines, Inc., and certain of its employees	February 22, 1962	February 27, 1962	27 FR 1789	
94	11007	Prescribing regulations for the formation and use of advisory committees	February 26, 1962	February 28, 1962	27 FR 1875	
95	11008	Creating an emergency board to investigate dispute between the Akron & Barberton Belt Railroad Company and other carriers and certain of their employees	March 3, 1962	March 6, 1962	27 FR 2143	
96	11009	Amending the Manual for Courts-Martial, United States, 1951, to implement section 923a of Title 10, United States Code, relating to prosecution of bad check offenses	March 16, 1962	March 20, 1962	27 FR 2585	
97	11010	Amending Executive Order No. 10713, relating to the administration of the Ryukyu Islands	March 19, 1962	March 21, 1962	27 FR 2621	
98	11011	Creating an emergency board to investigate a dispute between the Trans World Airlines, Inc., and certain of its employees	March 20, 1962	March 22, 1962	27 FR 2677	
99	11012	Providing for the performance of certain functions under sections 1(a) and 1(b) of the Administrative Expenses Act of 1946	March 27, 1962	March 30, 1962	27 FR 2983	
100	11013	Creating a board of inquiry to report on a labor dispute affecting the maritime industry of the United States	April 7, 1962	April 10, 1962	27 FR 3373	
101	11014	Delegating to the Secretary of Commerce functions with respect to participation of the United States in the New York World's Fair	April 17, 1962	April 19, 1962	27 FR 3731	
102	11015	Creating an emergency board to investigate disputes between the Chicago and North Western Railway Company, the former Chicago, St. Paul, Minneapolis and Omaha Railway Company, now a part of the Chicago and North Western Railway Company by merger, and certain of their employees	April 23, 1962	April 25, 1962	27 FR 3905	
103	11016	Authorizing award of the Purple Heart	April 25, 1962	May 1, 1962	27 FR 4139	
104	11017	Providing for coordination with respect to outdoor recreation resources and establishing the Recreation Advisory Council	April 27, 1962	May 1, 1962	27 FR 4141	
105	11018	Increasing from three to four the number of Vice Chairmen of the President's Committee on Employment of the Handicapped	April 27, 1962	May 1, 1962	27 FR 4143	
106	11019	Amending Executive Order No. 10873 to provide for an exception to the Inter-American Development Bank's Immunity from suit specified in the International Organizations Immunities Act	April 27, 1962	May 1, 1962	27 FR 4145	
107	11020	Inspection of income, excess-profits, estate, and gift tax returns by the Senate Committee on Armed Services	May 7, 1962	May 9, 1962	27 FR 4407	
108	11021	Administration of the Trust Territory of the Pacific Islands by the Secretary of the Interior	May 7, 1962	May 9, 1962	27 FR 4409	
109	11022	Establishing this President's Council on Aging	May 14, 1962	May 17, 1962	27 FR 4659	
110	11023	Providing for the performance by the Secretary of Commerce of certain functions relating to the Coast and Geodetic Survey	May 28, 1962	June 1, 1962	27 FR 5131	
111	11024	Exemption of Alan T. Waterman from compulsory retirement for age	June 4, 1962	June 7, 1962	27 FR 5385	
112	11025	Creating a Board of Inquiry to report on a labor dispute affecting the aircraft industry of the United States	June 7, 1962	June 9, 1962	27 FR 5467	
113	11026	Amendment of Executive Order No. 11025, creating a Board of Inquiry to report on a labor dispute affecting the aircraft industry of the United States	June 8, 1962	?	27 FR 5531	
114	11027	Creating an emergency board to investigate a dispute between the New York Central Railroad Company System and the Pittsburgh and Lake Erie Railroad Company and certain of their employees	June 8, 1962	June 12, 1962	27 FR 5533	
115	11028	Transferring lands between the Clark and Mark Twain National Forests (Missouri) and adding certain lands to the Hiawatha National Forest (Michigan)	June 9, 1962	June 13, 1962	27 FR 5589	
116	11029	Amendment of Executive Order No. 11025, creating a Board of Inquiry to report on a labor dispute affecting the aircraft industry of the United States	June 13, 1962	June 15, 1962	27 FR 5699	
117	11030	Preparation, presentation, filing, and publication of Executive Orders and Proclamations	June 15, 1962	June 21, 1962	27 FR 5847	
118	11031	Quetico-Superior Committee	June 19, 1962	June 22, 1962	27 FR 5899	
119	11032	Amendment of Executive Order No. 5952 of November 23, 1932, as amended, prescribing the Army ration	June 19, 1962	June 22, 1962	27 FR 5901	
120	11033	Creating an emergency board to investigate disputes between the American Airlines, Inc., and certain of its employees	June 20, 1962	June 22, 1962	27 FR 5903	
121	11034	Administration of the Mutual Educational and Cultural Exchange Act of 1961	June 25, 1962	June 28, 1962	27 FR 6071	
122	11035	Management of Federal office space	July 9, 1962	July 11, 1962	27 FR 6519	
123	11036	Administration of the Agricultural Trade Development and Assistance Act of 1954, as amended	July 11, 1962	July 13, 1962	27 FR 6653	
124	11037	Amendment of section 12 of Executive Order No. 6260 of August 28, 1933, as amended	July 20, 1962	July 24, 1962	27 FR 6967	
125	11038	Continuing in effect Executive Order No. 10945 of May 24, 1961, relating to the administration of the Export Control Act of 1949, as amended	July 23, 1962	July 25, 1962	27 FR 7003	
126	11039	Extension of the President's Commission on Campaign Costs	August 3, 1962	August 7, 1962	27 FR 7755	
127	11040	Creating an emergency board to investigate dispute between the Belt Railway Company of Chicago and certain of its employees	August 6, 1962	August 9, 1962	27 FR 7857	
128	11041	Continuance and administration of the Peace Corps in the Department of State	August 6, 1962	August 9, 1962	27 FR 7859	
129	11042	Creating an emergency board to investigate a dispute between the Southern Pacific Company (Pacific Lines) and certain of its employees	August 10, 1962	August 14, 1962	27 FR 8067	
130	11043	Creating an emergency board to investigate dispute between the Pan American World Airways, Inc. and certain of its employees	August 14, 1962	August 16, 1962	27 FR 8157	
131	11044	Interagency Coordination of Arms Control and Disarmament Matters	August 20, 1962	August 22, 1962	27 FR 8341	
132	11045	Discontinuing the Guam Island Naval Defensive Sea Area and Guam Island Naval Airspace Reservation	August 21, 1962	August 25, 1962	27 FR 8511	
133	11046	Authorizing Award of the Bronze Star Medal	August 24, 1962	August 28, 1962	27 FR 8575	
134	11047	Delegating Certain Authority to the Secretary of Defense and the Administrator of the Federal Aviation Agency	August 28, 1962	August 30, 1962	27 FR 8665	
135	11048	Administration of Wake Island and Midway Island	September 4, 1962	September 6, 1962	27 FR 8851	
136	11049	Providing for the carrying out of the Public Works Acceleration Act	September 14, 1962	September 18, 1962	27 FR 9203	
137	11050	Creating an emergency board to investigate disputes between the REA Express and certain of its employees	September 14, 1962	September 18, 1962	27 FR 9205	
138	11051	Prescribing responsibilities of the Office of Emergency Planning in the Executive Office of the President	September 27, 1962	October 2, 1962	27 FR 9683	
139	11052	Cotton textiles and cotton textile products	September 28, 1962	October 2, 1962	27 FR 9691	
140	11053	Providing assistance for the removal of unlawful obstructions of justice in the State of Mississippi	September 30, 1962	October 2, 1962	27 FR 9693	
141	11054	Creating a Board of Inquiry to report on certain labor disputes affecting the maritime industry of the United States	October 1, 1962	October 2, 1962	27 FR 9695	
142	11055	Inspection of income tax returns by the House Select Committee on Small Business	October 9, 1962	October 11, 1962	27 FR 9981	
143	11056	Assigning to the Civil Service Commission certain authority with respect to Federal salaries	October 11, 1962	October 12, 1962	27 FR 10017	
144	11057	Authorization for the communication of restricted data by the Department of State	October 18, 1962	October 20, 1962	27 FR 10289	
145	11058	Assigning authority with respect to ordering persons and units in the Ready Reserve to active duty and with respect to extension of enlistments and other periods of service in the armed forces	October 23, 1962	October 25, 1962	27 FR 10403	
146	11059	Designating public international organizations entitled to enjoy certain privileges, exemptions, and immunities	October 23, 1962	October 25, 1962	27 FR 10405	
147	11060	Prescribing certain regulations and delegating to the Attorney General certain authority of the President to prescribe other regulations relating to the recovery from tortiously liable third persons of the cost of hospital and medical care and treatment furnished by the United States	November 7, 1962	November 9, 1962	27 FR 10925	
148	11061	Mrs. Anna Eleanor Roosevelt	November 8, 1962	November 9, 1962	27 FR 10927	
149	11062	Amendment of Executive Order No. 10480, relating to the administration of the Defense Mobilization Program, so as to designate the Department of Defense as a loan guaranteeing agency	November 19, 1962	November 21, 1962	27 FR 11447	
150	11063	Equal opportunity in housing	November 20, 1962	November 24, 1962	27 FR 11527	
151	11064	Excusing Federal employees from duty on December 24, 1962	November 21, 1962	November 27, 1962	27 FR 11579	
152	11065	Inspection of income, excess-profits, estate, and gift tax returns by the Senate Committee on Foreign Relations	November 21, 1962	November 27, 1962	27 FR 11581	
153	11066	Including certain tracts of land in the Cherokee and Jefferson National Forests, in Tennessee and Virginia	November 27, 1962	November 29, 1962	27 FR 11733	
154	11067	Including certain tracts of land in the Nantahala and Cherokee National Forests, respectively	November 27, 1962	November 29, 1962	27 FR 11749	
155	11068	Creating a board of inquiry to report on a labor dispute affecting the ballistics missile, space vehicle and military aircraft industry	November 28, 1962	November 30, 1962	27 FR 11793	
156	11069	Amending Executive Order No. 11017 so as to designate the Secretary of Commerce as a member of the Recreation Advisory Council	November 28, 1962	December 1, 1962	27 FR 11847	
157	11070	Amendment of the list of communicable diseases contained in Executive Order No. 9708 of March 26, 1946, as amended by Executive Order No. 10532 of May 28, 1954	December 12, 1962	December 14, 1962	27 FR 12393	
158	11071	Designation of certain foreign countries as economically less developed countries for purposes of the Revenue Act of 1962	December 27, 1962	December 29, 1962	27 FR 12875	
159	11072	Extending the exterior boundaries of the Superior National Forest in Minnesota and the Clark National Forest in Missouri	December 28, 1962	January 1, 1963	28 FR 3	

=== 1963 ===
Relative No.	Absolute No.	Title/Description	Date signed	Date published	FR citation	Ref.
160	11073	Providing for Federal Salary Administration	January 2, 1963	January 9, 1963	28 FR 203	
161	11074	Establishing the President's Council on Physical Fitness	January 8, 1963	January 10, 1963	28 FR 259	
162	11075	Administration of the Trade Expansion Act of 1962	January 15, 1963	January 18, 1963	28 FR 473	
163	11076	Establishing the President's Advisory Commission on Narcotic and Drug Abuse	January 15, 1963	January 18, 1963	28 FR 478	
164	11077	Administration of the Migration and Refugee Assistance Act of 1962	January 22, 1963	January 24, 1963	28 FR 629	
165	11078	Creating a Board of Inquiry to Report On a Labor Dispute Affecting the Ballistics Missile, Space Vehicle and Military Aircraft Industry	January 23, 1963	January 25, 1963	28 FR 679	
166	11079	Providing for the prescribing of regulations under which members of the armed forces and others may accept fellowships, scholarships or grants	January 25, 1963	January 29, 1963	27 FR 819	
167	11080	Inspection of income, excess-profits, estate, and gift tax returns by the Senate Committee on Foreign Relations	January 29, 1963	January 31, 1963	28 FR 903	
168	11081	Amending the Manual for Courts-Martial, United States, 1951, to implement section 815 of title 10, United States Code, relating to nonjudicial punishment	January 29, 1963	February 1, 1963	28 FR 945	
169	11082	Inspection of income, excess-profits, estate, and gift tax returns by the Senate Committee on Government Operations	February 4, 1963	February 6, 1963	28 FR 1131	
170	11083	Inspection of income, excess-profits, estate, and gift tax returns by the Committee on Government Operations, House of Representatives	February 6, 1963	February 8, 1963	28 FR 1245	
171	11084	Amending Executive Order No. 10995, relating to telecommunications	February 15, 1963	February 19, 1963	28 FR 1531	
172	11085	The Presidential Medal of Freedom	February 22, 1963	February 26, 1963	28 FR 1759	
173	11086	Amendment of Executive Order No. 10587 relating to the administration of section 32(h) of the Trading with the Enemy Act	February 26, 1963	February 28, 1963	28 FR 1833	
174	11087	Assigning emergency preparedness functions to the Secretary of State	February 26, 1963	February 28, 1963	28 FR 1835	
175	11088	Assigning emergency preparedness functions to the Secretary of the Treasury	February 26, 1963	February 28, 1963	28 FR 1837	
176	11089	Assigning emergency preparedness functions to the Atomic Energy Commission	February 26, 1963	February 28, 1963	28 FR 1839	
177	11090	Assigning emergency preparedness functions to the Civil Aeronautics Board	February 26, 1963	February 28, 1963	28 FR 1841	
178	11091	Assigning emergency preparedness functions to the Civil Service Commission	February 26, 1963	February 28, 1963	28 FR 1843	
179	11092	Assigning emergency preparedness functions to the Federal Communications Commission	February 26, 1963	February 28, 1963	28 FR 1847	
180	11093	Assigning emergency preparedness functions to the Administrator of General Services	February 26, 1963	February 28, 1963	28 FR 1851	
181	11094	Assigning emergency preparedness functions to: The Board of Governors of the Federal Reserve System; The Federal Home Loan Bank Board; The Farm Credit Administration; The Export-Import Bank of Washington; The Board of Directors of the Federal Deposit Insurance Corporation; The Securities and Exchange Commission; The Administrator of the Small Business Administration; and The Administrator of Veterans Affairs	February 26, 1963	February 28, 1963	28 FR 1855	
182	11095	Assigning emergency preparedness functions to: The Board of Directors of the Tennessee Valley Authority; The Railroad Retirement Board; The Administrator of the National Aeronautics and Space Administration; The Federal Power Commission; The Director of the National Science Foundation	February 26, 1963	February 28, 1963	28 FR 1859	
183	11096	Establishing a seal for the United States Civil Service Commission	February 28, 1963	March 2, 1963	28 FR 2021	
184	11097	Amendment of Executive Order No. 10501, as amended, relating to authority for the original classification of defense information and material	February 28, 1963	March 7, 1963	28 FR 2225	
185	11098	Amending the Selective Service regulations	March 14, 1963	March 19, 1963	28 FR 2615	
186	11099	Inspection of income, estate, and gift tax returns by the House of Committee on Public Works	March 14, 1963	March 19, 1963	28 FR 2619	
187	11100	Establishing the President's Commission on Registration and Voting Participation	March 30, 1963	April 2, 1963	28 FR 3149	
188	11101	Creating an emergency board to investigate disputes between the carriers represented by the Eastern, Western, and Southwestern Carriers' Conference Committees and certain of their employees	April 3, 1963	April 5, 1963	28 FR 3305	
189	11102	Inspection of returns by possessions of the United States	April 4, 1963	April 6, 1963	28 FR 3373	
190	11103	Providing for the appointment of former Peace Corps volunteers to the civilian career services	April 10, 1963	April 12, 1963	28 FR 3571	
191	11104	U.S.S. Thresher	April 12, 1963	April 16, 1963	28 FR 3689	
192	11105	Transferring to the Housing and Home Finance Administrator certain functions of the Atomic Energy Commission under the Atomic Energy Community Act of 1955	April 18, 1963	April 20, 1963	28 FR 3909	
193	11106	Providing for the administration of the trade agreements program and related matters	April 18, 1963	April 20, 1963	28 FR 3911	
194	11107	Administration of Alaska railroads	April 25, 1963	April 30, 1963	28 FR 4225	
195	11108	Delegating authority under the International Wheat Agreement Act of 1949, as amended, to the Secretary of Agriculture	May 22, 1963	May 24, 1963	28 FR 5185	
196	11109	Inspection of income, excess-profits, estate, and gift tax returns by the Committee on Un-American Activities, House of Representatives	May 27, 1963	May 30, 1963	28 FR 5351	
197	11110	Amendment of Executive Order No. 10289, as amended, relating to the performance of certain functions affecting the Department of the Treasury	June 4, 1963	June 7, 1963	28 FR 5605	
198	11111	Providing assistance for the removal of obstructions of justice and suppression of unlawful combinations within the State of Alabama	June 11, 1963	June 12, 1963	28 FR 5709	
199	11112	Establishing the President's Advisory Council on the Arts	June 12, 1963	June 14, 1963	28 FR 6037	
200	11113	Amendment of Executive Order No. 11075, as amended, relating to the administration of the trade agreements program	June 13, 1963	June 15, 1963	28 FR 6183	
201	11114	Extending the authority of the President's Committee on Equal Employment Opportunity	June 22, 1963	June 25, 1963	28 FR 6485	
202	11115	Creating an emergency board to investigate disputes between the Pullman Company, the Chicago, Rock Island & Pacific Railroad Company, the New York Central System, and the Soo Line Railroad Company and certain of their employees	July 4, 1963	July 6, 1963	28 FR 6905	
203	11116	Prescribing rates of charges for certain hospitalization and dispensary services and delegating authority to prescribe such rates	August 5, 1963	August 8, 1963	28 FR 8075	
204	11117	Establishing an Interagency Committee on International Athletics	August 13, 1963	August 16, 1963	28 FR 8397	
205	11118	Providing Assistance for Removal of Unlawful Obstructions of Justice in the State of Alabama	September 10, 1963	September 11, 1963	28 FR 9863	
206	11119	Amending the Selective Service regulations	September 10, 1963	September 11, 1963	28 FR 9865	
207	11120	Amendment of Executive Order No. 10152, relating to incentive pay for hazardous duty, Executive Order No. 10168, relating to pay for sea duty and duty at certain places, and Executive Order No. 10204, relating to basic allowances for quarters	October 2, 1963	October 3, 1963	28 FR 10631	
208	11121	Creating an emergency board to investigate a dispute between the United Air Lines, Inc., and certain of its employees	October 9, 1963	October 10, 1963	28 FR 10855	
209	11122	Establishing the Rural Development Committee	October 16, 1963	October 18, 1963	28 FR 11171	
210	11123	Amendment of Executive Order No. 10853, relating to various allowances to certain Government personnel on foreign duty	October 18, 1963	October 22, 1963	28 FR 11607	
211	11124	Enlarging the membership of the President's Advisory Council on the Arts	October 28, 1963	October 31, 1963	28 FR 11607	
212	11125	Delegating authority of the President under sections 205 and 208 of Title 18 of the United States Code, relating to conflicts of interest	October 29, 1963	October 31, 1963	28 FR 11609	
213	11126	Establishing a committee and a council relating to the status of women	November 1, 1963	November 1, 1963	28 FR 11717	
214	11127	Creating an emergency board to investigate a dispute between the Florida East Coast Railway Company and certain of its employees	November 9, 1963	November 13, 1963	28 FR 12079	
