= David Brown (Massachusetts protester) =

David Brown was convicted of sedition because of his criticism of the United States federal government and received the harshest sentence for anyone under the Sedition Act of 1798 for erecting the Dedham Liberty Pole.

== Personal life ==
Originally from Bethlehem, Connecticut, Brown was a veteran of the American Revolutionary War. (Note: There were several David Browns from Connecticut who served in the Revolution. He may have been a lieutenant in the 9th Connecticut Regiment in Captain James Green's company.He suffered several injuries fighting in New York. He may also have served in Captain Eleazor Hutchinson's company of militia and deserted for six weeks in the fall of 1776.) It is unknown what Brown did after his release from prison, or where or when he died.

== Political views ==
Brown thought the wealthy had gained too much political power in the new republic: "All our administration is fast approaching to Lords and Commons as possible, that a few men should possess the whole country and the rest be tenants to the others." Additionally, he thought the current system created a cycle in which the elites used their wealth to gain more political power, and then used their political power to create more wealth.

This, plus the fact that elected officials only represented speculators, and not the common man, meant that representative government did not work in his opinion. He believed that Americans would soon find themselves "the same chains of American tyrants that we once sported ourselves from under Britain."

He accused Federalist leaders of wanting a submissive, unthinking populace. He said they set themselves about the people, and expected them, like "the subjects of Julius Caesar, we must bow down and worship our Leaders as the Gods of Jupiter and Mars." Brown thought if people didn't fight back they were "to be brought into abject slavery." He worried that if Congress did not start listening to the public that the public "will finally break out like the burning mountain of Aetna, and we'll have an unconditional redress of their grievances."

== Liberty pole ==
In the early American republic, Brown went throughout the towns arguing against the newly formed national United States government. He had written a treatise entitle "Dissertations," and would preach from it as he traveled, hoping to raise enough money to print it before the next election. (Note: No copies of Dissertations survive, but sections were read into court records and thus were preserved.) Fisher Ames called him a "wandering apostle of sedition" who spread "bold falsehoods" and "artful and inflammatory sophistry."

After two years of touring New England, he arrived in Dedham, Massachusetts in November 1798. There, Brown led a group including Benjamin Fairbanks in setting up a liberty pole with the words, "No Stamp Act, No Sedition Act, No Alien Bills, No Land Tax, downfall to the Tyrants of America; peace and retirement to the President; Long Live the Vice President," referring to then-President John Adams and Vice President Thomas Jefferson. (Note: Lurie says the pole rose a week after he left town.)

Brown was arrested in Andover, Massachusetts but because he could not afford the $4,000 bail, he was taken to Salem for trial. The Federalist press at the time was convinced there were others like him, causing trouble and raising liberty poles in every corner of the state.

== Trial, imprisonment, and pardon ==
Brown was indicted in June 1799. He initially pled not guilty, but when he saw the strength of the government's case against him he changed his plea to guilty. Despite the guilty plea, Justice Samuel Chase wanted him to name everybody who had helped him or who subscribed to his writings. Brown refused, saying doing so would cause him to "lose all my friends."

Chase called seven prosecution witnesses to testify against Brown but Brown, who did not have a lawyer, was not able to cross examine them. One witness testified that he had heard Brown teaching that the aim of government "was to plunder and steal." This same witness said he had a large effect on those who heard him.

Despite sentencing Benjamin Fairbanks to a very light penalty for his part in erecting the pole, Chase came down hard on Brown for the "malignity and magnitude" of his crimes. Brown apologized to the judge and promised not to repeat the behavior. He also asked the judge not to impose a fine, as he had no way of paying it off.

Chase fined him $400, plus $80 in court fees. He then sentenced Brown to 18 months in prison, the most severe sentence then imposed under the Alien and Sedition Acts. (Note: Lure says it was six months in prison, plus as additional six because he could not pay the fine.)

In December 1800, at the end of his term, Brown could not afford to pay the fine and President Adams refused to set him free. In February 1801, approaching two years, the longest sentence of anyone under the Sedition Act, Brown again appealed to Adams and was again denied.

In 1801, newly elected President Thomas Jefferson pardoned Brown along with all violators of the act.

== See also ==
- List of people pardoned or granted clemency by the president of the United States

== Works cited ==
- Curtis, Michael Kent (2000). Free speech, "the people's darling privilege": struggles for freedom of expression in American history. Duke University Press. p. 88. ISBN 978-0-8223-2529-1.
- Tise, Larry E. (1998). The American counterrevolution: a retreat from liberty, 1783-1800. Stackpole Books. ISBN 978-0-8117-0100-6.
- Lurie, Shira (2023). The American Liberty Pole: Popular Politics and the Struggle for Democracy in the Early Republic. University of Virginia Press.
- Slack, Charles (2015). Liberty's First Crisis: Adams, Jefferson, and the Misfits Who Saved Free Speech. Atlantic Monthly Press. ISBN 978-0802123428.
