= Dedham Community House =

Building in Dedham, Massachusetts

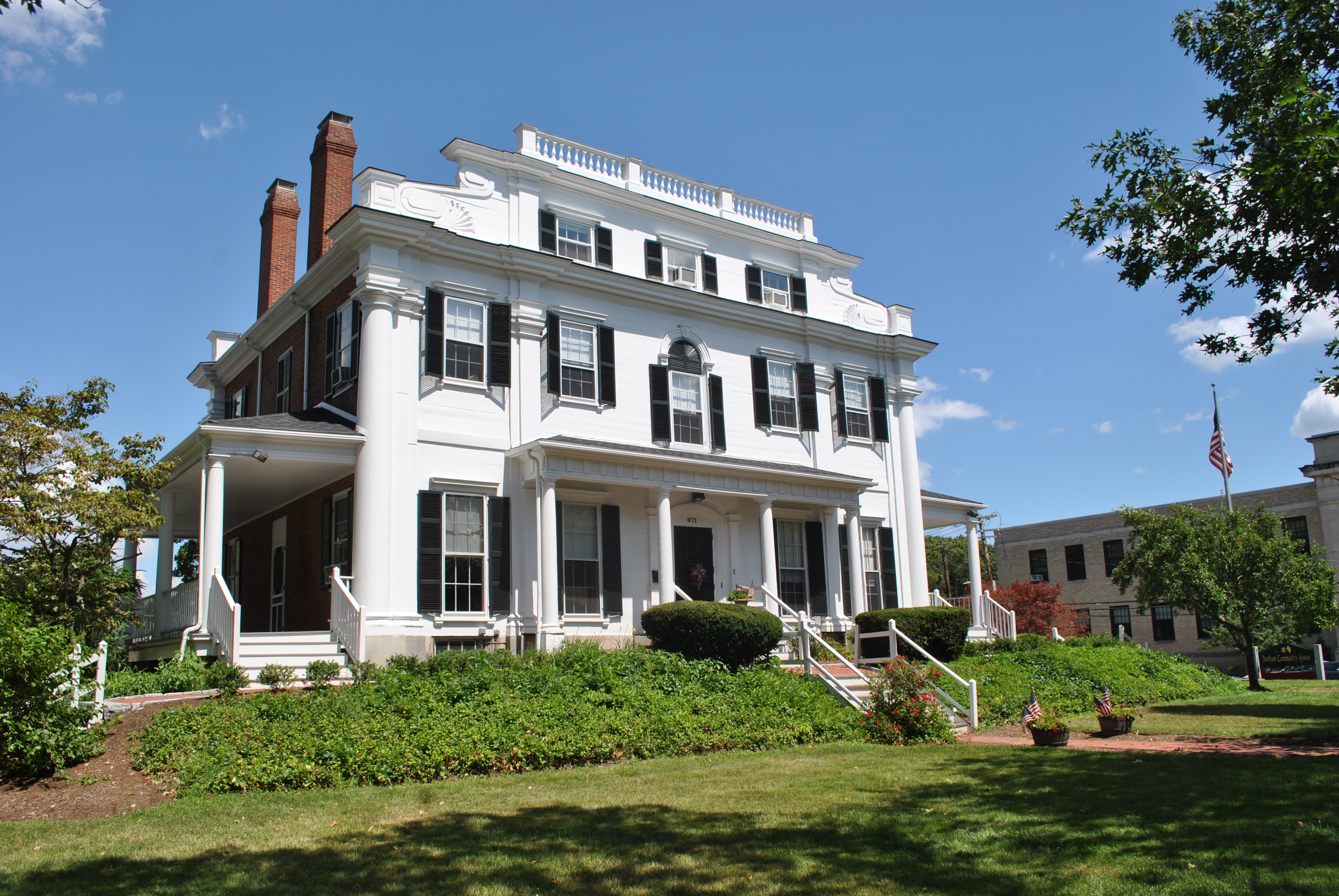
The Dedham Community House at the corner of High and Ames St in Dedham, Massachusetts

The Dedham Community House is a house on the banks of the Charles River in Dedham, Massachusetts, owned and operated by the Dedham Community Association.

== Haven house ==
It was originally built in 1798 for Judge Samuel Haven and designed by Charles Bulfinch. The land was once owned by Haven's father, Jason Haven, and maternal grandfather, Samuel Dexter. It was noted as one of the most hospitable houses of the day in Massachusetts. The Havens entertained many distinguished guests, including Richard Henry Dana Sr., Elizabeth Peabody, Nathaniel Hawthorne and his wife, Horace Mann and his wife, Oliver Wendell Holmes Sr., Oliver Wendell Holmes Jr., Washington Allston and his wife, Charles Folsom and his wife, Judge Theron Metcalf and his wife, and Abraham Lincoln. The house is mentioned in The Life of Nathaniel Hawthorne by Julian Hawthorne.

The rooms on the first floor feature high ceilings, long French windows, tiled fireplaces, carved mahogany mantles and moldings, and original chandeliers. A curved staircase leads to a second floor with smaller chamber rooms. The front door handle features a hex mark designed to keep witches and fire from harming the house.

After the Havens, the house was owned by Freeman Fisher. (Note: Freeman was the brother of Alvan Fisher. He had three sons, Henry, Edward, and William. In the back yard was a garden engine that was similar to a contemporary fire engine. The family later moved to a home on the old Mechanics Building property.)

== Lincoln visit ==
On September 20, 1848, then-Congressman Abe Lincoln arrived by train at Dedham station. He was met by a brass band and they accompanied him down the street to the Haven House where he had lunch. Lincoln then walked to the Temperance Hall where he gave a speech promoting Zachary Taylor's bid for the White House.

Lincoln's hour long speech was praised by Whig newspapers but criticized by Democratic ones. The Roxbury Gazette, for example, called it "a melancholy display" while journalist George Moore said Lincoln was "all the time gaining on his audience. He soon had us under his spell." The crowd asked him to stay longer, but Lincoln left when he heard the nearby train whistle as he had other engagements that evening.

A bust of Lincoln, sculpted by Dedham's Alexander Doyle, is now on display in the house.

== Community House ==
In 1922 it was purchased by Charles J. Kimball and a group of civic-minded citizens for use as a community center. In the early 1970s it housed the Town's teen center.

Today the Community House is dedicated to "advancing the educational, recreational, cultural and civic interests of residents of all ages of Dedham and surrounding communities." They offer a pre-school, summer camp, and a variety of classes and workshops throughout the year for all ages. In 1924, the House hosted six weeks of supervised play for children during the summer months. The program was expanded and moved to the various neighborhoods of town the following summer.

In 2017, a grant from the Foundation for MetroWest paid to refurbish the 27 windows of the building. As part of that project, old cupboards and cabinets were discovered after having previously been painted shut. The house was shown in the 2014 film The Judge.

== Works cited ==
- Smith, Frank (1936). A History of Dedham, Massachusetts. Transcript Press, Incorporated.
- Clarke, Wm. Horatio (1903). Mid-Century Memories of Dedham. Dedham Historical Society.
- Parr, James L. (2009). Dedham: Historic and Heroic Tales From Shiretown. The History Press. ISBN 978-1-59629-750-0.

42.24946°N 71.17676°W
