= Samuel Haven =

Samuel Haven may refer to:

- Samuel Haven (judge), judge from Dedham, Massachusetts
- Samuel Foster Haven, his son, American archeologist and anthropologist
