= Temperance Hall (Dedham, Massachusetts) =

Assembly hall in Massachusetts, US

Coordinates: 42.2476°N 71.177°W

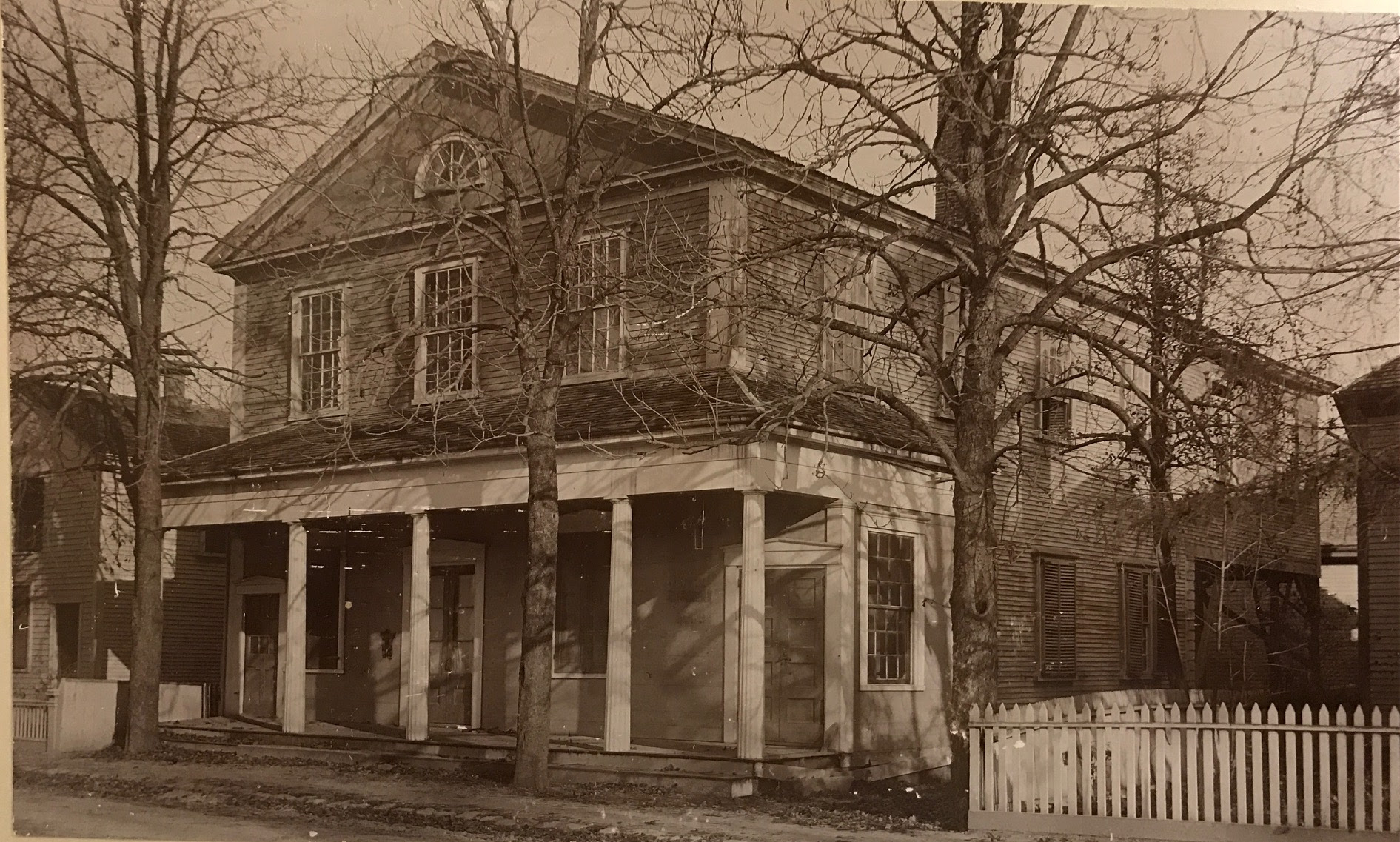
Temperance Hall

Temperance Hall was an assembly hall in Dedham, Massachusetts associated with the temperance movement. It previously served as the Norfolk County Courthouse.

== History ==
After the creation of Norfolk County in 1793, a new courthouse was ordered to be constructed. It was completed in 1795. It was found to be too small, however, and the ceilings were so low as to stifle people in the courtrooms.

After a new Norfolk County Courthouse was constructed in 1827, the old building was sold at public auction to Harris Monroe and Erastus Worthington. The pair speculated that the Town may want to use it as a town hall, and so they dragged it south down Court Street to a new lot. The Town decided to build an entirely new structure, however, on Bullard Street.

Worthington and Monroe then rented out the first floor, which had been used as county offices, as a retail space and apartment. It was used for a long time after that as a millinery shop. (Note: The shop was run by the sister of Ned Holmes.) The second floor, which had the old courtroom, was converted into an assembly hall. In 1845, it was sold again to the Temperance Hall Association.

== Use as Temperance Hall ==
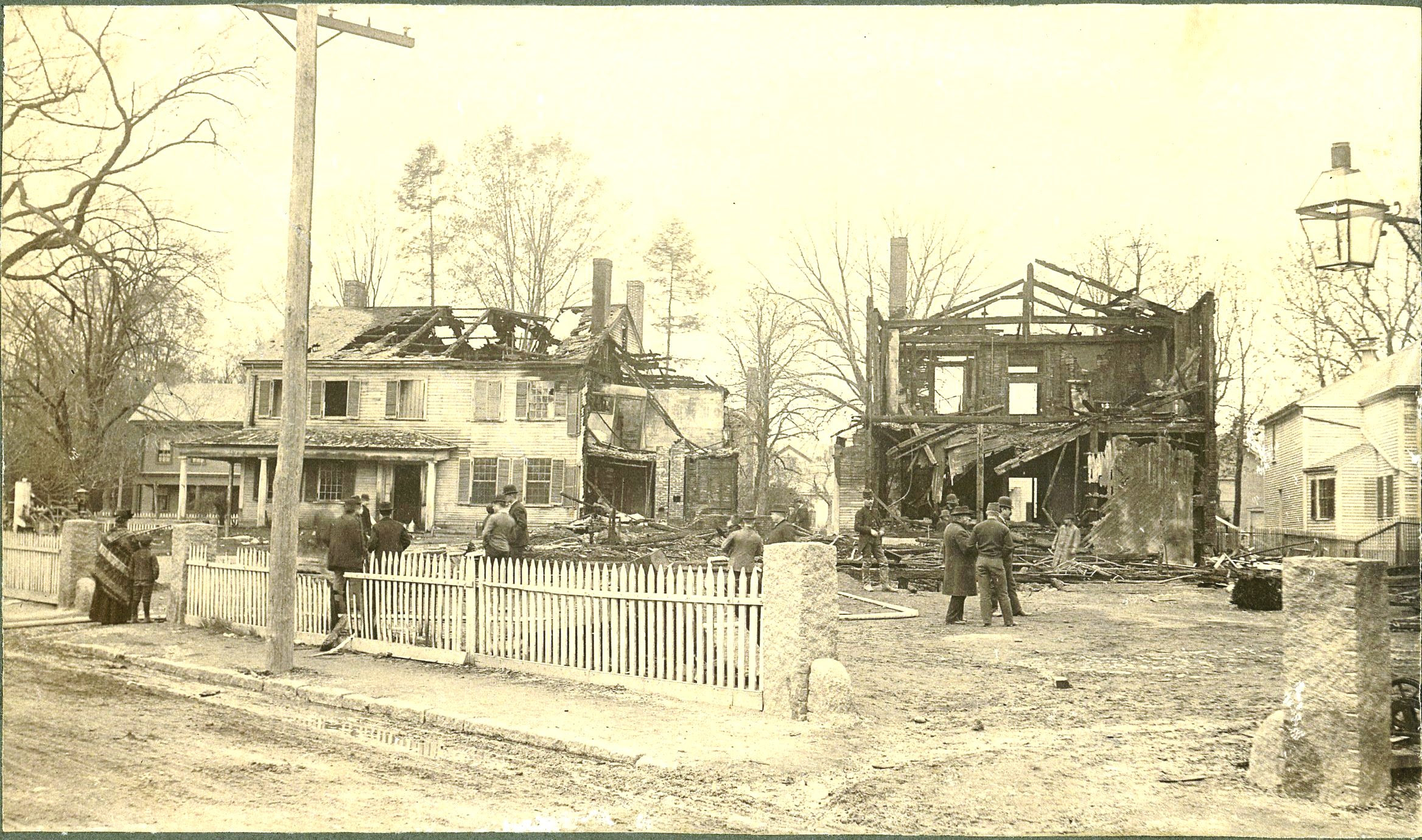
Temperance Hall after the 1891 fire.

The Temperance Hall Association, which was part of the temperance movement that opposed alcohol, extended the second floor by building an addition propped up by stilts that extended into the back yard. The hall was rented out to a great number of organizations. Among the groups using the hall were ventriloquists, magicians, a painted panorama entitled "The Burning of Moscow," a glassblowing exhibition, a demonstration of a model volcano called "The Eruption of Vesuvius," plays, concerts, including one by the Mendelssohn String Quartet, lectures, fundraisers, debates, bell ringers, and marching sessions by a para-military drill club. Among the speakers who took the podium there were Theodore Parker, Oliver Wendell Holmes, Frederick Douglass, Horace Mann, Father Matthew, and Abraham Lincoln.

By 1846, the Catholic community in Dedham was well established enough that the town became part of the mission of St. Joseph's Church in Roxbury. The flood of Irish immigrants escaping the Great Famine necessitated celebrating Mass in Temperance Hall, often by Father Patrick O'Beirne. At the outset of the American Civil War, a meeting in the hall was held to recruit men to fight.

It was later owned by George Alden who also ran a grocery store on the first floor. (Note: Alden had a son, John.) The building burned down on April 28, 1891.

=== Lincoln visit ===
On September 20, 1848, then-Congressman Abe Lincoln arrived by train at Dedham station. He was met by a brass band and they accompanied him down the street to the Haven House where he had lunch. Lincoln then walked to Temperance Hall where he gave a speech promoting Zachary Taylor's bid for the White House.

Lincoln's hour long speech was praised by Whig newspapers but criticized by Democratic ones. The Roxbury Gazette, for example, called it "a melancholy display" while journalist George Moore said Lincoln was "all the time gaining on his audience. He soon had us under his spell." The crowd asked him to stay longer, but Lincoln left when he heard the nearby train whistle as he had other engagements that evening.

=== Fenian raid ===
Following the Civil War, the local chapter of the Fenian Brotherhood, which had offices in the nearby Norfolk House, hosted a meeting in which a Fenian raid into Canada was organized. John R. Bullard, a recent Harvard Law School graduate, was elected moderator of the meeting and, having been swept up in his own sudden importance and fever of the meeting, ended his animated speech by asking "Who would be the first man to come forward and pledge himself to go to Canada and help free Ireland?" The first of the roughly dozen men to sign the "enlistment papers" were Patrick Donohoe and Thomas Golden. Thomas Brennan said he could not participate, but donated $50 to the cause. The meeting ended with the group singing "The Wearing of the Green."

The raid was a failure. Some of the men got as far as St. Albans, Vermont, but none made it to Canada. A few were arrested and some had to send home for money. Around the same time, Patrick Ford, the treasurer of the Brotherhood, absconded to South America with the organization's money.

== Works cited ==
- Smith, Frank (1936). A History of Dedham, Massachusetts. Transcript Press. "st mary dedham."
- Byrne, William; Leahy, W. A.; Dowling, Austin; Young, E. J. A.; Finen, J. E. (1899). Introductory. The Hurd & Everts co. pp. 323–324.
- Clarke, Wm. Horatio (1903). Mid-Century Memories of Dedham. Dedham Historical Society.
- Hurd, Duane Hamilton (1884). History of Norfolk County, Massachusetts: With Biographical Sketches of Many of Its Pioneers and Prominent Men. J. W. Lewis & Company.
- Hanson, Robert Brand (1976). Dedham, Massachusetts, 1635-1890. Dedham Historical Society.
- Parr, James L. (2009). Dedham: Historic and Heroic Tales From Shiretown. The History Press. ISBN 978-1-59629-750-0.
