= Church of the Good Shepherd (Dedham, Massachusetts) =

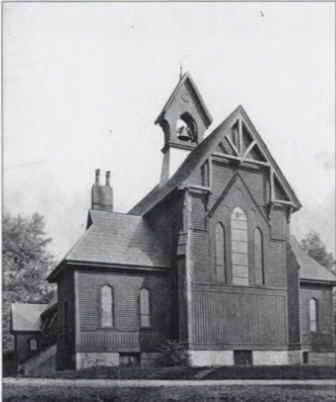
- Church of the Good Shepherd
- 42°14′29″N 71°9′19″W
- Address: 62 Cedar St, Dedham, MA 02026
- Country: United States
- Denomination: Episcopal
- Website: www.thechurchofthegoodshepherd.com

History
- Consecrated: November 2, 1876

Architecture
- Groundbreaking: June 8, 1876

Administration
- Diocese: Massachusetts

Clergy
- Priest: Chitral De Mel

The Church of the Good Shepherd is an Episcopal church in Dedham, Massachusetts, and the Episcopal Diocese of Massachusetts.

== History ==
=== Founding ===
The first group of Anglicans in Dedham began meeting in Clapboardtrees in 1731. A few decades later, Samuel Colburn (Note: Colburn was a descendant of Nathaniel Colburn and John Hunting.) died in the Crown Point Expedition of 1756. Though he was not an Anglican, he left almost his entire estate to the Anglican community in Dedham to establish St. Paul's Church.

Charles C. Sanderson, who sold the building lots in Oakdale, also erected a building containing a public hall and a store. A mission Sunday school was begun by lay readers from St. Paul's in the Sanderson Building on June 8, 1873 for Anglicans in the Oakdale section of town who could not get to the church easily. Services in the early years were also held in private homes. Soon after, on June 29, 1873, public services of the Episcopal Church were begun in Sanderson Hall and for three years they were conducted by lay readers.

The mission was funded by the family of Horatio Chickering, a member of St. Paul's. (Note: Horatio was the son of Jabez Chickering and the brother of Hannah Chickering.) In 1874, Chickering purchased a lot of land for the purpose of building a church. He died in the spring of 1875 but he made provision in his will for the erection of the church. Besides the gifts of the church and land by Chickering, the parish received other bequests from his widow, Lucy Lee Chickering, and from his sisters.

The members of the Church Sewing Society all submitted anonynous nominations for the name of the new church after the first gathering, and the name St. Barnabas was strongly considered. Then, Lucy Chickering read the name Good Shepherd, and declared that it was the perfect name for a congregation with no pastor of their own. The parish was organized under the name of the Church of the Good Shepherd and, at the 86th Annual Meeting of the Convention of the Diocese of Massachusetts in 1876, it was voted to accept the Church into union with the convention. William Franklin Cheney was also elected to take charge of the congregation in August 1876.

=== Construction ===
Designed by William P. Wentworth, the church was constructed by Oakdale resident Charles Welsh. The cornerstone of the church was laid by Bishop Benjamin Henry Paddock on June 8, 1876 and he consecrated the church just a few months later, on November 2. It was originally painted a warm gray color, but in 1893 it was painted red with green trim. In the 1920s, at the time the rectory was built next to it, the church was covered in stucco.

The church features ash woodwork throughout and stained glass windows, including one from Tiffany & Co.. Memorial windows are dedicated to the memory of Chickering and his sisters, Mrs. DF Adams and Miss HB Chickering. The Chapel of All Saints is dedicated to Cheney.

On Christmas Eve, 1880, the church's new bell was rung for the first time. As the sound the bell made was similar to the sound the Dedham Fire Department's bell made when alerting the public to a fire, a crowd gathered and expected to see a conflagration.

=== 21st Century ===
During the Flag Day Parade, members of the parish cook and sell hot dogs and drinks to those gathered in Oakdale Square. They then split the proceeds with the Dedham Food Pantry. The parish embraces their calling "to serve as a prohetic voice for justice." The church is used for scout meetings, storytelling events, music and dance performances, and holiday celebrations.

The organ was repaired and all of the electronic systems replaced in 2026. The undercroft of the church was also renovated, including the kitchen.

As part of their 150th anniversary fundraising campaign, they hoped to raise money to restore and protect their stained glass windows, and to remove the bell from the belfry and incorporate it into the landscape.

=== Clergy ===
| Priest | Years of service | Notes |
|---|---|---|
| William F. Cheney | August 1876 - 1921 | |
| Chitral de Mel | | (Note: de Mel was born in Sri Lanka and came to the United States in 1989. He worked as a civil rights attorney before being ordained.) |

== Community ==
A tradition began the 1880s of youngsters from the community climbing to the top of the bell tower and ringing the bells at midnight on July 4 to celebrate Independence Day.

Beginning in the early 1900s and continuing until the 1990s, bonfires would be held first in Oakdale Square and then in the Manor to celebrate the 4th of July. It would usually begin at midnight, either on July 3 or July 4, when a young person would climb onto the roof of the Church and ring the bell. This would signal others to bring old farm carts they had stolen into Oakdale Square and light them ablaze.

The Church, along with the Dedham Country Day School, were the first to sponsor cub scout packs in Dedham. As of 2023, the Church still sponsors Troop 3 of the Scouts BSA.

== Connection to William B. Gould ==
After arriving in Dedham in 1871, William B. Gould signed the Articles of Incorporation and became a founder of the Church. He and his wife were baptized and confirmed there in 1878 and 1879.

Gould's family remained active members of the church and, along with the Bonds and one other family, the Chesnuts, were the only black parishioners. (Note: There was only one other black family in Dedham at the time.) Five generations of Goulds would ultimately be baptized there.

A pew at the Church is dedicated to William and Cornelia. When a park in Dedham was named in his honor, a sign with Gould's name and image was unveiled by his great-great-great-grandchildren. It was then blessed by the former rector of the Church, Rev. Noble Scheepers. When a statue was unveiled there two years later, it was blessed by Rev. Chitral De Mel, the then-current rector of the Church.

== Works cited ==
- Alexander, Adele Logan (July 2000). Homelands and Waterways: The American Journey of the Bond Family, 1846–1926 (Amazon Kindle ed.). Knopf Doubleday Publishing Group. ISBN 978-0-307-42625-3.
- Dedham Historical Society (2001). Images of America: Dedham. Arcadia Publishing. ISBN 978-0-7385-0944-0.
- Convention of the Protestant Episcopal Church in the Diocese of Massachusetts (1876). Journal of the Eighty-Sixth Annual Meeting of the Convention of the Protestant Episcopal Church in the Diocese of Massachusetts. Diocesan House.
- Convention of the Protestant Episcopal Church in the Diocese of Massachusetts (1877). Journal of the Eighty-Seventh Annual Meeting of the Convention of the Protestant Episcopal Church in the Diocese of Massachusetts. Diocesan House.
- Hanson, Robert Brand (1976). Dedham, Massachusetts, 1635–1890. Dedham Historical Society.
- Gould IV, William B. (2002). Diary of a Contraband: The Civil War Passage of a Black Sailor (paperback ed.). Stanford University Press. ISBN 0-8047-4708-3.
- Hurd, Duane Hamilton (1884). History of Norfolk County, Massachusetts: With Biographical Sketches of Many of Its Pioneers and Prominent Men. J. W. Lewis & Company. pp. 90–91.
- Neiswander, Judith (2024). Mother Brook and the Mills of East Dedham. Damianos Publishing. ISBN 978-1-941573-66-2.
- Parr, James L. (2009). Dedham: Historic and Heroic Tales From Shiretown. The History Press. ISBN 978-1-59629-750-0.
- Cheney, Rev. William Franklin (1927). The Chickering-Alleyne family : a paper before the Dedham Historical Society. Boston: Thomas Todd Co.
