= Arthur Stivaletta =

American activist (1934–2002)

Arthur Stivaletta (June 9, 1934 - April 18, 2002), also known as Mr. Wake Up America, was an American political activist and building contractor from Dedham, Massachusetts.

== Personal life ==
Stivaletta was born on June 9, 1934, to Joseph J. and Antoinette (née Paldero) Stivaletta. He had brothers Albert, Joseph, Paul, Michael, Edward, and Robert. He had four children, Debra, Cheryl, Arthur, and Jay. He was friends with Massachusetts Auditor Joseph DeNucci.

Stivaletta died April 18, 2002, at the Glover Hospital (now Beth Israel Deaconess Hospital – Needham) in Needham, Massachusetts, and was buried at Brookdale Cemetery.

== Political activism ==
Stivaletta considered himself to be an "average American," but others called him a "superpatriot" and a "modern Paul Revere. His rallies frequently featured conservative figures such as Bob Hope and Al Capp. He received national attention for his efforts.

=== Vietnam War ===
Several days before Moratorium to End the War in Vietnam, Stivaletta had a dream in which he saw Pope John XXIII, President John F. Kennedy, Abraham Lincoln, and Bob Hope. The dream ended with a white dove being chased by a raven carrying an olive branch in its beak. He interpreted the dream as a call to wake America up and to warn them of false peacemakers.

During an October 1969 rally attended by 100,000 protesters on Boston Common to end the war, he dropped thousands of leaflets on the crowd in support of the troops from an airplane overhead. In the spring of 1970, he sponsored a "Wake Up America" rally on the Common to support "the Constitution, God and Country." The rally, which was hosted by Hope, attracted a crowd of 65,000 people.

In the 1970s, Stivaletta campaigned for more pride in the United States and condemned acts he saw as unpatriotic, such as "burning the American flag, waving the Vietcong Flag, and what the SDS and the Weathermen do." Bumper stickers and billboard messages he produced were commonly seen during that decade. He also sponsored a bracelet campaign to show support for prisoners of war.

=== Plaque ===
In 1976 Stivaletta persuaded the Massachusetts House of Representatives to erect a plaque in the Massachusetts State House honoring him. It read in part, "Presented in grateful recognition to Arthur Stivaletta ... His dream of sharing his love of country with his fellow Americans will live forever[.]"

=== Terrorism ===
Following the hijacking of TWA Flight 847 and the taking of 40 American hostages in Beirut, Stivaletta hired a plane to tow a banner along the Massachusetts coast from Scituate to Salisbury that read: "Mr. Wake Up America says, 'Let's kick ass with terrorists.'"

=== Flag burnings ===
During the Vietnam War, he burned the flag of the Viet Cong on the Boston Common. In 1981, he burned a Soviet flag to protest the suppression of human rights in Poland. After the Iran hostage crisis, he burned Iranian flags.

=== Flag Day Parade ===
After Stivaletta claimed to be a co-sponsor of the Flag Day Parade in Dedham in 1971, organizers publicly clarified that he participated but was not a sponsor.

== Philanthropy ==
He was chairman of the Friends of the Christopher Columbus Committee that erected a statue of Columbus at the Christopher Columbus Waterfront Park in the North End of Boston.

=== Baby Cemetery ===
In the late 1940s, Joseph Stivaletta purchased land that once housed Hannah B. Chickering's Temporary Asylum for Discharged Female Prisoners. He discovered Baby Cemetery on the property and, rather than disturb the graves, set the land aside and did not build a home on it. When Massachusetts Route 128 was being constructed, Joseph convinced then-Transportation Secretary John Volpe to move the road rather than disturb the graves. Volpe's family came from the same small town in Italy as Joseph.

In 1998, Stivaletta and the other heirs to his father's estate gifted the land to the Town of Dedham.
