= Jabez Chickering =

American lawyer (died 1826)

Jabez Chickering (circa 1782-October 20, 1826) was a lawyer and businessman from Dedham, Massachusetts.

== Personal life ==
Chickering was the son of the minister in Dedham's South Church, also named Jabez Chickering, (Note: Rev. Jabez Chickering (November 4, 1753 – March 12, 1812) was the minister of what is now First Congregational Church Norwood from 1776 until his death. Born in the Springfield section of Dedham, Massachusetts (now Dover), he was the sole surviving infant after his father and siblings died in 1754. He studied theology under Benjamin Caryl and graduated from Harvard College in 1774. Chickering taught at the Colburn School before becoming a minister. He married Hannah Balch, daughter of his predecessor Thomas Balch, and they had six children, including Jabez Chickering, Jr., a lawyer involved in Baker v. Fales. A Federalist, Chickering was known for his eloquent extemporaneous prayers and his kindness toward children. He officiated 203 marriages, baptized 351 people, and expanded his congregation by 78 members. In 1790, he helped establish the Social Circulating Library, which evolved into the Morrill Memorial Library, donating books and his salary to support it. He spent the last nine months of his life as an invalid before passing in 1812. When he died, he left behind an estate worth more than $30,000, including more than 177 acres of land. His 1806 Federal-style house still stands at Chickering Road and Walpole Street in Norwood, and a memorial window and plaque honor him at the church.) and his wife Hannah, the daughter of Thomas Balch. He was a descendant of Francis Chickering. His older brother, Joseph Chickering, was a minister in Woburn and Phillipston and his uncle, Manasseh Cutler, was a congressman and minister.

He was graduated from Harvard College in 1804. At Harvard, the topic of his graduation speech was "The evils arising to society from Avarice, Indolence, and Ambition." He was described by a family historian as a "young man [who] was ambitious and... felt equal to many things. From his boyhood he had always lived in the sunlight of prosperity. He was attractive, popular, and restless. He was very involved in town affairs.

He had a wife, Deborah Dorothy Alleyne, who was from "an old and illustrious Dedham family and 'considered something of an heiress.'" (Note: Deborah was a descendant of Edward Alleyn. She died on July 31, 1843 and is buried in the Old Village Cemetery.) When they were married in 1805, Deborah received "a considerable dowry" and, as a gift from her family in England, an estate in that country. They had six children, (Note: Neiswander says they had seven children.) including Hannah B. Chickering, Jabez Chickering Jr., (Note: The younger Jabez Chickering died in Cincinnati, Ohio after a freak carriage accident.) and Horatio Chickering. (Note: Horatio became a successful flour merchant. He built the Italinate house at 50 Old River Place in Dedham, and helped to found the Church of the Good Shepherd. He provided for his widowed mother and sisters, and a clause in his will said that any property he left to a woman was to be hers alone, and should be "free from the interference and control of any husband.")

Chickering built a Federal-style home at 45 Court Street. (Note: The house was later used as the rectory for St. Paul's Church.)

== Career ==
Chickering was a lawyer with a large practice and a justice of the peace.

Along with William Phillips, Chickering was a principal incorporator of the Dedham Worsted Company on Mother Brook. It went out of business after only three years, however, and the mill was purchased by Benjamin Bussey. He leased a building at the fourth privilege from George Bird for a carding mill. He later moved his operationg further upstream.

In 1813, he founded and published The Dedham Gazette, with Theron Metcalf as editor. He invested heavily in real estate, particularly around Wigwam Pond.

In September 1821, he applied to become a Unitarian minister, saying he had "faithfully & regularly attended to the studies of the Theology School at Cambridge. A professor, Andrews Norton, however, protested that his "certificate was not regularly voted" and that Chickering "has been far from faithfully attending to my exercises".

=== Dedham Bank ===
When the Dedham Bank was established in 1814, Chickering was chosen as both a director and a cashier.

In January 1824, the public became aware that Chickering had gone bankrupt and went to New York to try and recoup some of his money. On February 2, the directors and shareholders of the Dedham Bank, where Chickering was a cashier, were informed that $35,000 was also missing. (Note: This is the equivalent of $1 million in 2024 dollars.)

Hermann Mann wrote in his diary that Chickering was "eminent as a lawyer, liberal and enlightened as a man, active and useful as a citizen," but that he caused "much surprise and consternation... when it was ascertained that he was bankrupt, and had taken a French leave of his creditors, and was not to be found."

His wife was eventually able to pay off the bank and other individuals to whom Chickering owed money. To do so, she had to sell their house and all their property. The Dedham Worsted Company collapsed in the wake. All his property on Mother Brook was sold in April 1824 and, the following month, all of his land around Wigwam Pond was also sold in a sheriff's sale.

Chickering fled with his family to Monroe, Michigan, at the time a tiny outpost on the farthest fringe of European settlements on the continent.

== Dispute at First Church ==
Chickering was very involved in the affairs of the First Church and Parish in Dedham and he played the viol with the choir. When Rev. Jason Haven died, Chickering was appointed to the committee to find his replacement. Bates was unpopular with the congregation, and it was hoped that the new minister's politics would be more in line with the community. On March 1, 1818, just days after Bates left town, Chickering and the committee produced Alvan Lamson. Lamson was an 1817 graduate of Harvard Divinity School, a Unitarian stronghold. The congregation were largely conservative Calvinists.

Those who opposed Lamson did not raise any objections to his moral or professional qualifications. They did, however, object to his theology and found him lacking in "spirituality and knowledge of the scriptures" and displayed little of "that which fixes the attention and reaches the heart". Lamson's initial reaction seems to have been to decline the call, given the size of the opposition, but he was persuaded to accept by Chickering. Many members of the church stormed out when they heard he had accepted.

A council was called to consider the situation and then to ordain Lamson. Chickering presented at the council letters showing that if all the members of the church had been present when the vote was taken that there would have been a majority in favor of Lamson. The council was not inclined to consider the views and membership status of the absent members and instead considered Lamson's qualifications.

The congregation was split, with the conservative church members leaving and taking the church's property with them. They also sent a committee, led by Chickering, to meet with Samuel Fales as the senior deacon. They demanded "Christian satisfaction" regarding his deaconship. When they reported back to the liberal sect, they charged Fales with leasing the parsonage house out without the church's consent. (Note: It was rented to a widow, Rebecca Alden, for $1.50 a year.) Fales was also accused of not giving direct answers to their questions, including which group he considered to be the true church. As a result, the liberal group voted to remove Fales as deacon but allowed him to remain a member of the church.

A lawsuit, Baker v. Fales, ensued, with the liberal members of the church attempting to regain possession of the church's property. At the trial in February 1820, the members of First Church were represented by Judge John Davis and Chickering while the breakaway church members were represented by Theron Metcalf, Samuel Haven, and a Mr. Prescott. Judge Samuel Wilde presided over the trial and the jury eventually ruled for Chickering's side.

The case was appealed to the Supreme Judicial Court and was heard during the October 1820 session. There, Massachusett's Solicitor General, Daniel Davis, represented the plaintiffs with Chickering. The breakaway defendants had Daniel Webster and Theron Metcalf representing them. Chickering's side won once again at the high court. The case was a major milestone in the road towards the separation of church and state and led to the Commonwealth formally disestablishing the Congregational Church in 1833.

In a pamphlet Haven published, Chickering was portrayed as one of the central "plotters" in the whole ordeal. Chickering then attempted to sue Haven for libel, but a grand jury in Norfolk County refused to indict Haven in October 1820. Chickering then tried in Cambridge, where the pamphlet was printed, and a Middlesex Grand Jury did indict him. Haven was arrested on December 1, 1819. Due in part to the long speech Haven gave in his own defense, the trial lasted over two days. (Note: It is thought the Daniel Webster may have assisted Haven.) Haven was acquitted.

== Flight to Michigan and death ==
In January 1824, Chickering fled with his family to Monroe, Michigan, at the time a tiny outpost on the farthest fringe of European settlements on the continent, after stealing $35,000 from the Dedham Bank. He speculated in real estate there and purchased a number of parcels in the center of town, and sold some to his brother-in-law, Jeremiah Smith Boies Alleyne. He also became a justice of the peace in 1826.

Chickering died on October 20, 1826. Death certificates were not issued at this time, and there is no official record of his cause of death. Newspaper notices in Dedham report the cause to be apoplexy, his family's biographer said he died of a "broken heart," and one historian suggested it may have been suicide due to "guilt and shame, as well as the loss of his respected position in Dedham." His estate, consisting only of personal effects and no real estate, was valued at $244.87 and his widow was described in court proceedings as "destitute."

Deborah returned to Jamaica Plain by 1839, where she operated a boarding house and was able to pay back all those from whom her husband stole at the bank.

== Works cited ==
- Burgess, Ebenezer (1840). Dedham Pulpit: Or, Sermons by the Pastors of the First Church in Dedham in the XVIIth and XVIIIth Centuries. Perkins & Marvin.
- Fanning, Patricia J. (2002). Norwood: A History. Arcadia Publishing. ISBN 978-0-7385-2404-7.
- Norwood (1906). Norwood, One of the Newest and Most Progressive Towns in Massachusetts: Her Industries, Past and Present, Business Houses, Societies, and Advantages for Location. Ambrose Bros., Printers.
- Hanson, Robert Brand (1976). Dedham, Massachusetts, 1635-1890. Dedham Historical Society.
- Worthington, Erastus (1900). Historical sketch of Mother Brook, Dedham, Mass: compiled from various records and papers, showing the diversion of a portion of the Charles River into the Neponset River and the manufactures on the stream, from 1639 to 1900. Dedham, MA: C.G. Wheeler.
- Smith, Frank (1936). A History of Dedham, Massachusetts. Transcript Press, Incorporated.
- Wright, Conrad (1988). "The Dedham Case Revisited". Proceedings of the Massachusetts Historical Society. 3. 100. Massachusetts Historical Society: 15–39. JSTOR 25080991.
- Austin, Walter (1912). Tale of a Dedham Tavern: History of the Norfolk Hotel, Dedham, Massachusetts. Priv. print. at the Riverside Press.
- Neiswander, Judith (2024). Mother Brook and the Mills of East Dedham. Damianos Publishing. ISBN 978-1-941573-66-2.
- Cheney, Rev. William Franklin (1927). The Chickering-Alleyne family : a paper before the Dedham Historical Society. Boston: Thomas Todd Co.
