= Christopher Columbus Waterfront Park =

Public park on the harbor in the North End, Boston, MA, USA

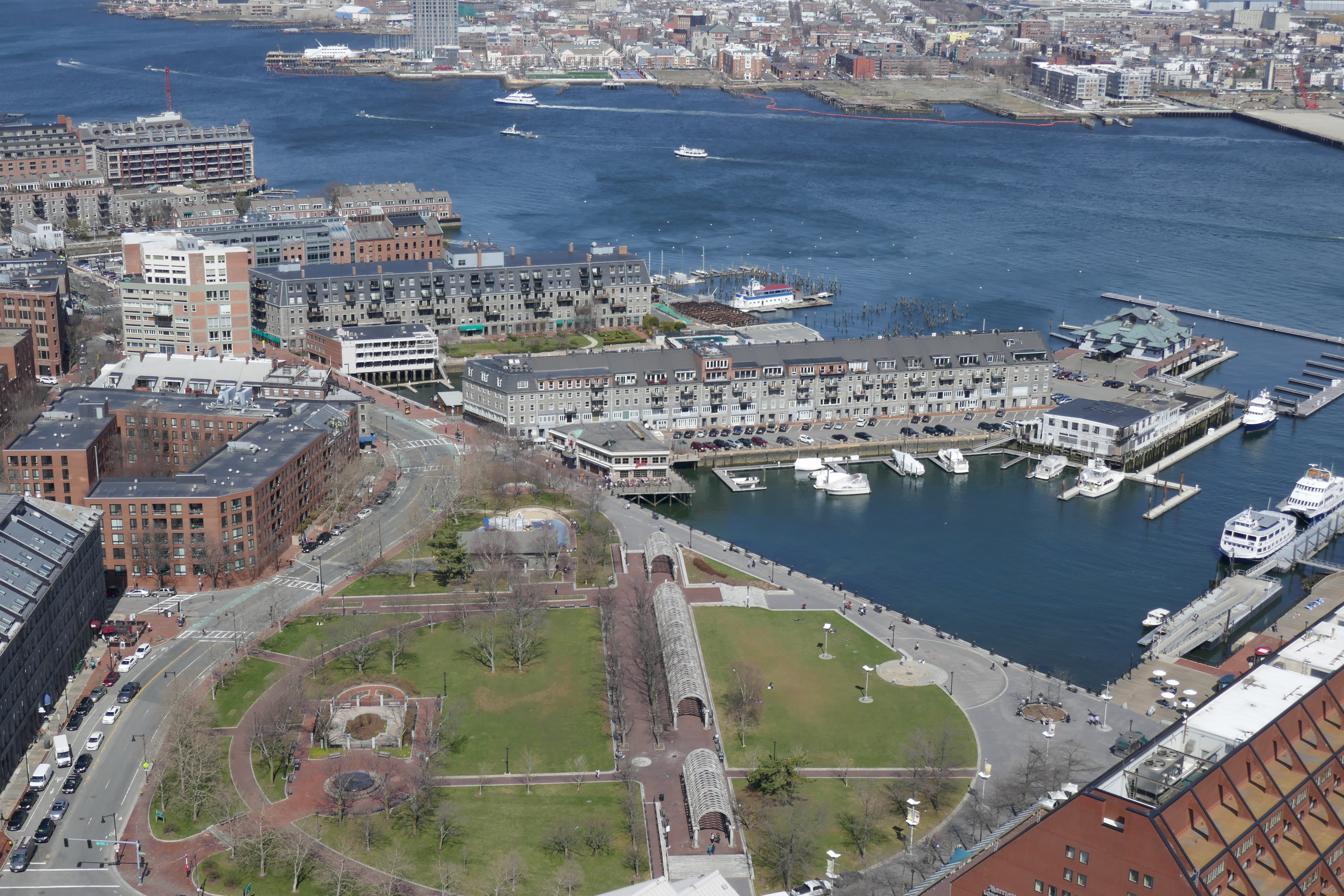
- Aerial view of the park in 2016
- Interactive map of Christopher Columbus Waterfront Park
- Type: Public Park
- Location: Boston
- Coordinates: 42°21′40″N 71°03′06″W
- Created: 1967

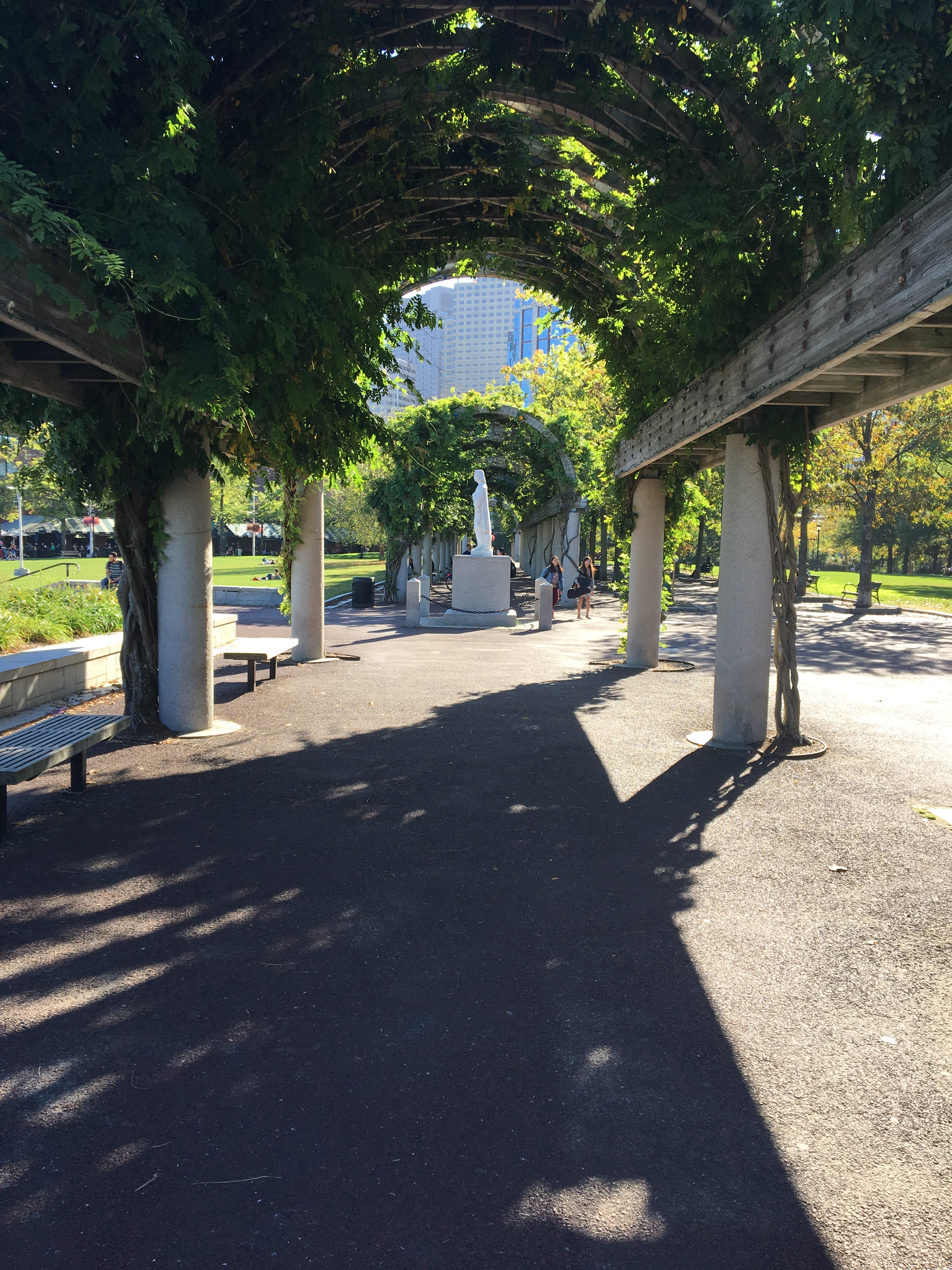
Christopher Columbus Park

The Christopher Columbus Waterfront Park is a public park in the North End of Boston, Massachusetts. It is considered the start of the Boston Irish heritage trail.

== History ==
According to a self-published work by the Massachusetts State Council of the Knights of Columbus, in 1967, their organization voted to establish a non-profit corporation to construct affordable housing. The Boston Redevelopment Authority selected them to develop a parcel, but the Supreme Council of the Order did not like the idea. The Massachusetts State Council constructed the Christopher Columbus Waterfront Park instead in honor of their patron, Christopher Columbus.

Other sources suggest the park was originally going to be known as Waterfront Park, planned by the efforts of local banker Frank S. Christian (d. 1970), the placement of an Italian marble statue of Columbus was entirely ad hoc, and the park was only renamed for Christopher Columbus through the efforts of local provocateur Arthur Stivaletta with the approval of Mayor Kevin White in the weeks prior to his 1979 reelection with new-found Italian-American support.

The Massachusetts Beirut Memorial on the site was dedicated in the park in 1992.

In 1999, the director of the Massachusetts Historical Society denounced the park as a poor use of city resources with inappropriate symbolism, observing that Boston has no connection to Christopher Columbus. He recommended restoring the park to commemorate its historical use as a fishing wharf.

The Columbus statue was frequently vandalized: with red paint and the word "murderer" in 2004, beheaded for the first time in 2006, and spray painted with "Black Lives Matter" in 2015. Most recently, in the early morning hours of June 9, 2020, the head portion of the statue of Columbus was removed and stolen. Mayor Marty Walsh said the remaining portion of the stature would be removed and placed into storage and the city would be reviewing if the Italian marble statue would ever be placed in a high visibility location in the future. Walsh announced a few days prior to Columbus Day 2020 that the statue would not return, and would instead possibly be replaced with one commemorating Italian immigrants to America under the guidance of the Boston Art Commission.

== See also ==
- Boston Marriott Long Wharf, adjacent to the south

== Works cited ==
- Lapomarda, Vincent A. (1992). The Knights of Columbus in Massachusetts (second ed.). Norwood, Massachusetts: Knights of Columbus Massachusetts State Council.
