= William Allen (Massachusetts judge) =

American judge (1822–1891)

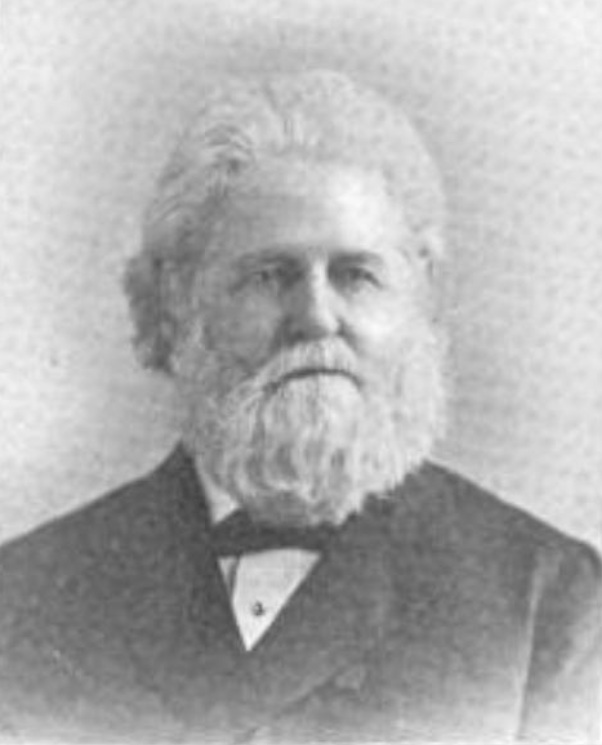
Justice William Allen

William Allen (1822 – June 4, 1891) was an American lawyer and judge who served as a justice of the Massachusetts Supreme Judicial Court from 1881 until his death in 1891. He was appointed by Governor John Davis Long.

== Early life, education, and career ==
Born in Brunswick, Maine, he received his preparatory education at Phillips Andover Academy and North Yarmouth Academy in Maine. He entered Bowdoin College at 16. His father, also named William Allen, was president of the college. Allen graduated from Amherst in 1842.

He began the study of law at Yale Law School, and later completed his legal training in Northampton, Massachusetts. He gained admission to the bar in Northampton in 1845, "and there he practised law for twenty-seven years". Early in his career, Allen partnered with C. R. Huntington, from 1849 to 1852, and later with Judge Daniel Bond from 1869 to 1971. His practice was generally unremarkable, with "no momentous events or startling incidents", though Allen gained recognition for his work for one branch of the Blake family in the Blake will contest in Boston, where his argument and brief on the construction of the will were described as the best presented in the case.

== Judicial service ==
In 1872, Governor William B. Washburn appointed Allen to the Massachusetts Superior Court, to a seat vacated by the resignation of Judge Scudder. Allen served on that court until 1881, when Governor John Davis Long elevated him to a seat on the Massachusetts Supreme Judicial Court.

Allen thereafter served on the supreme court until his death.

At the time of his death he had authored a number of recent opinions and was responsible for several more that were pending; this, combined with the recent death of another justice, Charles Devens, raised questions as to whether some cases would need to be re-argued.

== Personal life and death ==
In 1858 Allen married Elizabeth H. Tenney, daughter of Rev. Dr. Tenney of Northampton. They had a daughter, and Elizabeth and their daughter survived Allen.

Allen died suddenly at his home in Northampton around the age of 69. He had continued to sit with the full bench through the prior fall, and attended the court's last consultation on May 18, where he mentioned suffering from sciatica.

Political offices
| Preceded by James Denison Colt | Justice of the Massachusetts Supreme Judicial Court; 1881–1891 | Succeeded by James Barker |
