= James Denison Colt =

American judge

James Denison Colt (October 8, 1819 – August 9, 1881) served two stints as an associate justice of the Massachusetts Supreme Judicial Court. The first was from 1865 to 1866 and the second was from 1868 to 1881. He was appointed the first time by Governor John Albion Andrew and the second time by Governor Alexander H. Bullock. He died by committing suicide with a revolver in his office.

Political offices
| Preceded by Theron Metcalf; Reuben Atwater Chapman | Justice of the Massachusetts Supreme Judicial Court; 1865–1866; 1868–1881 | Succeeded by John Wells; William Allen |
