= Thomas Balch (minister) =

Thomas Balch (1712-January 8, 1774) was a Colonial minister in South Dedham, Massachusetts.

Balch was born in Charlestown, Massachusetts in 1712. He was graduated from Harvard College in 1733.

Balch first took the pulpit on June 30, 1736. The Balch School was named for him in 1867 in Norwood, Massachusetts. A new school was built on the same site in 1913 and is also known as the Balch School.

When Norwood separated from Dedham in 1872, Balch was a potential name for the community. His daughter, Mary, married Manasseh Cutler, and Cutler studied under the elder Balch for the ministry. Another daughter, Hannah, married Jabez Chickering. They also had a son named Jabez Chickering, Balch's grandson.

Balch died on January 8, 1774, 38 years after being ordained.

== Works cited ==
- Burgess, Ebenezer (1840). Dedham Pulpit: Or, Sermons by the Pastors of the First Church in Dedham in the XVIIth and XVIIIth Centuries. Perkins & Marvin.
