= Baby Cemetery =

Cemetery in Dedham, Massachusetts

Coordinates: 42.231°N 71.187°W

Baby Cemetery is an historic cemetery in Dedham, Massachusetts. The 3,000 square foot plot of land is located at the end of Pond Farm Road, near the border with Westwood.

In 1863, Hannah B. Chickering established the Temporary Asylum for Discharged Female Prisoners on land that once belonged to Eliphalet Pond in Dedham. The halfway house served women who had left prison, and the children buried there were born to them. Many of the women, who were housed with men, were sexually assaulted while in prison.

There are 11 small, oval stones made of marble marking the graves of children, but records indicate that at least two more were buried there. The oldest was two years and one day old, and most were less than one year old. All died between 1871 and 1882 and it has since closed. It is thought that there could be as many as 50 more bodies buried there, including some women.

The land was purchased in the late 1940s by Joseph Stivaletta, a local developer. (Note: Stivaletta is the father of Arthur Stivaletta.) He discovered the graves and, rather than disturb them, set the land aside and did not build a home on it. When Massachusetts Route 128 was being constructed, Stivaletta convinced then-Transportation Secretary John Volpe to move the road rather than disturb the graves. Volpe's family came from the same small town in Italy as Stivaletta.

Stivaletta died in 1956 and property taxes were not paid on the property, resulting in a lein being placed on the property in 1963. Neighbors cared for the property for many years, mowing the grass and planting flowers. The Town of Dedham was unaware of the cemetery's existence until alerted to it by a neighbor in 1991.

Town Meeting voted to accept the cemetery in 1998 after being gifted the land from the Stivaletta family.
