= Statue of Christopher Columbus (North End, Boston) =

Statue in North End, Boston, Massachusetts, U.S.

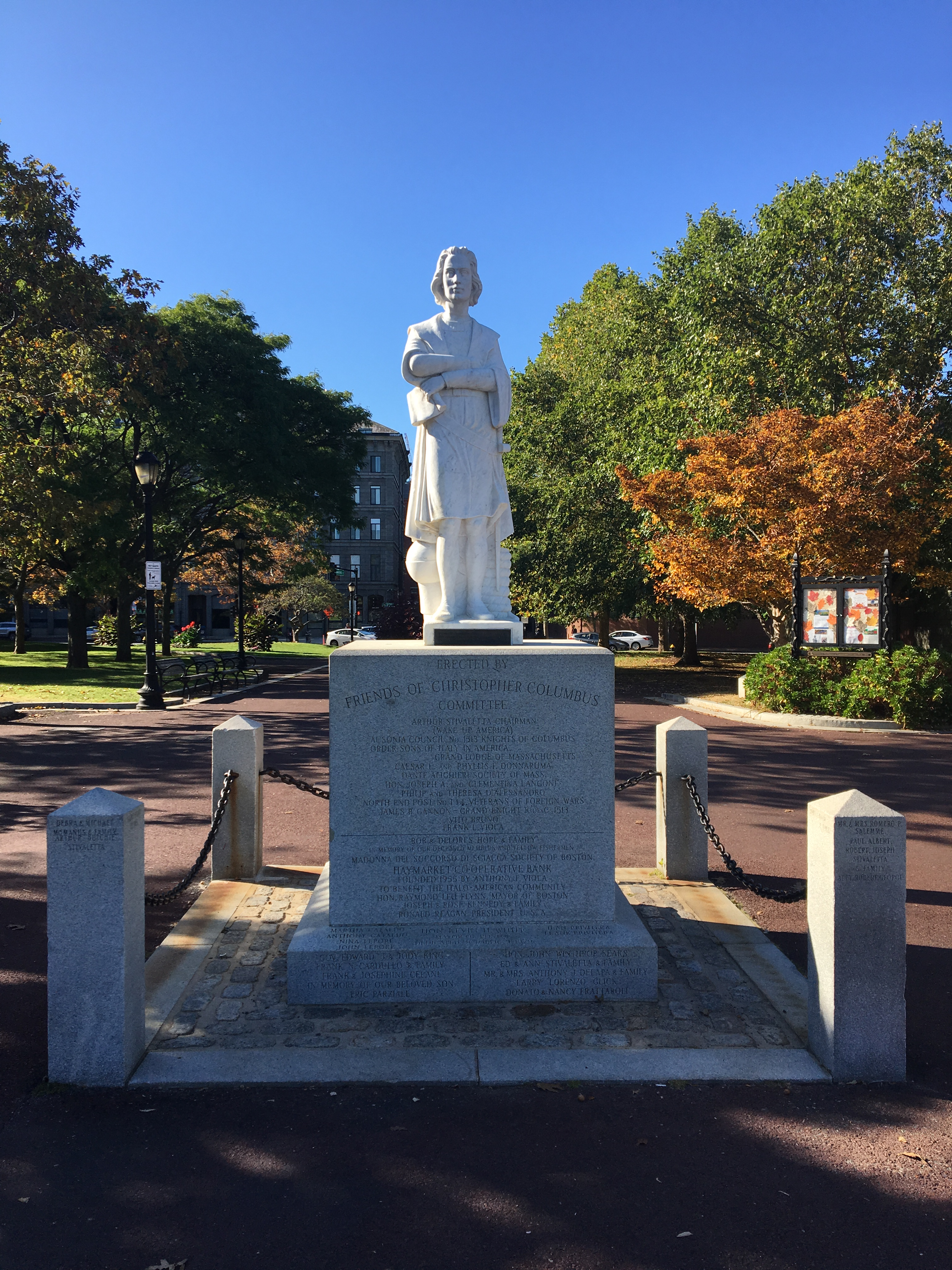
- The statue in 2019
- Year: 1979
- Medium: Marble sculpture
- Subject: Christopher Columbus
- Condition: Decapitated and put in storage for undisclosed period.
- Location: Boston, Massachusetts, U.S.; 42°21′41″N 71°03′04″W

A statue of Christopher Columbus was installed in Christopher Columbus Waterfront Park, in Boston's North End, in the U.S. state of Massachusetts. On June 11, 2020, the statue was removed for an undisclosed period after it was decapitated by protestors on the evening of June 9, 2020 during the George Floyd protests.

== Background ==
The Knights of Columbus, a Catholic organization dominated by Italian Americans, opened Waterfront Park in 1976. In 1979, pro-Vietnam War activist and building contractor Arthur Stivaletta commissioned the statue. The Knights accordingly changed the name of the park to Christopher Columbus Waterfront Park.

The North End was a traditionally Italian neighborhood, and Columbus was a symbolic figure for Italian Americans in Boston as well as throughout the country. As early as 1900, George A. Scigliano had pushed to designate Columbus Day a holiday in Massachusetts. Conversely, other Catholics in Boston apparently did not appreciate the use of Columbus; in 1922, the Irish-American cardinal William Henry O'Connell removed a statue of Columbus from the Cathedral of the Holy Cross.

== Description ==
The statue is made of marble imported from Carrara, an ancient quarry in Tuscany. The pedestal beneath it displays Stivaletta's name and the names of other prominent Italian Americans from the North End. It also names the Knights of Columbus and Order Sons of Italy in America.

== History ==
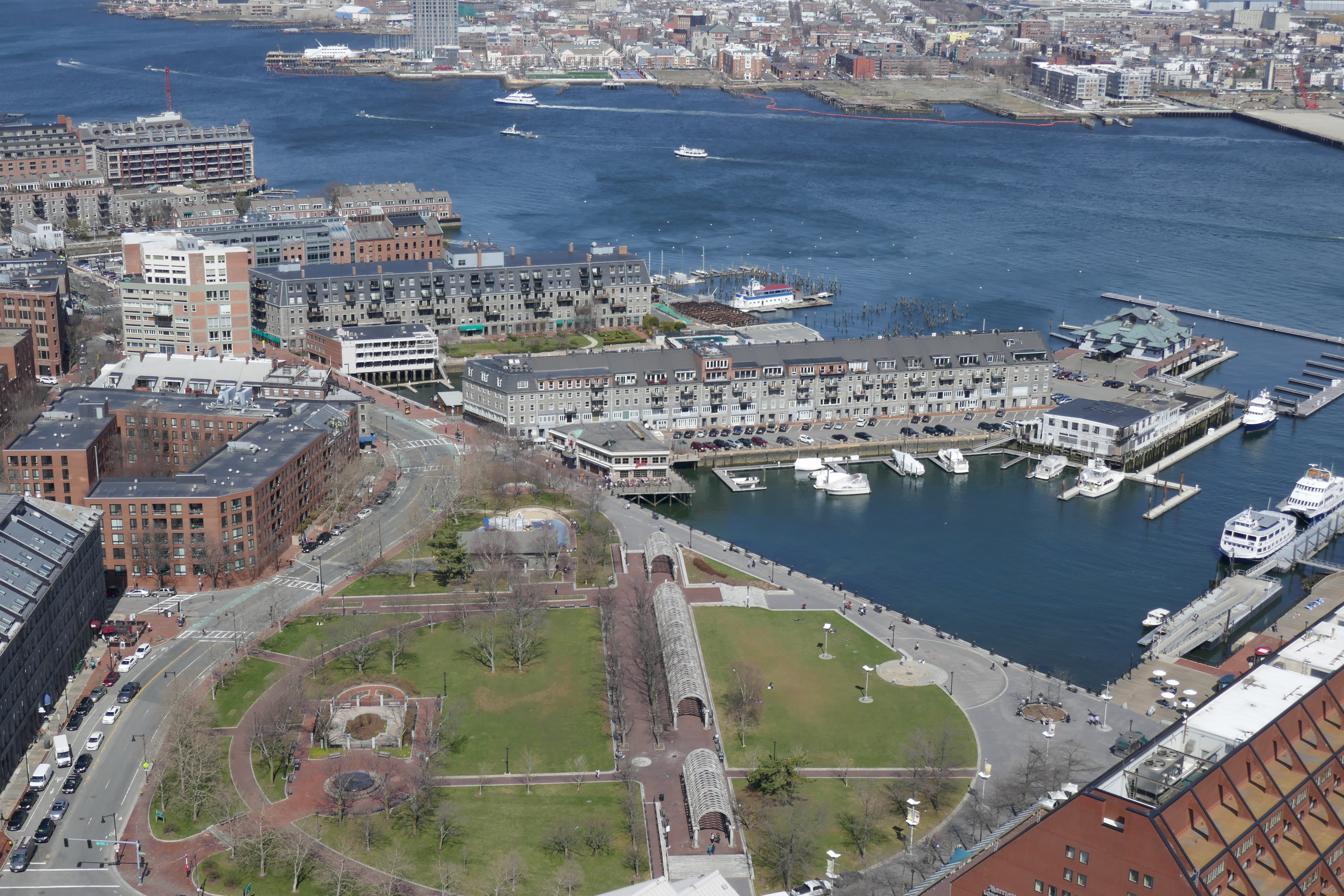
The statue was installed in Boston's Christopher Columbus Waterfront Park

The statue was dedicated on Columbus Day 1979, at a ceremony attended by Stivaletta, the Italian American community of Boston, Mayor Kevin White and former governor John Volpe. Shortly afterwards, on November 18, 1979, Stivaletta burned the flag of Iran in front of the statue. He presented to the audience of 200 spectators a man wearing a rubber devil mask, explaining that he was a caricature of the Ayatollah Khomeini. In December 1981, Stivaletta's organization Wake Up America burned the flag of the Soviet Union in front of the statue. Stivaletta remarked, “We stand here before Christopher Columbus, in a country founded by people looking for political and religious freedom … to show support for nations searching for freedom.”

On Columbus Day 1982, the Friends of Christopher Columbus Park held a Catholic mass in front of the statue and laid a wreath on its pedestal. In 1999, the director of the Massachusetts Historical Society published an op-ed in the Boston Globe calling for the statue to be removed, noting that Boston has no historical connection to Christopher Columbus. He suggested restoring the park to commemorate its historical use as a fishing wharf.

=== Vandalism and removal ===
In the 2000s, the statue suffered vandalism such as being spray painted with the word "murderer." In June 2006, the statue was decapitated in an apparent prank; the head was later located elsewhere in the North End. In 2004 and 2006, the statue was covered in red paint. After the latter incident an anti-colonialist manifesto was posted to the Independent Media Center website, taking responsibility for the act. In 2015, the white marble statue was vandalized with red paint and the phrase "Black Lives Matter."

In June 2020, the statue was beheaded and subsequently removed. Mayor Marty Walsh announced that the statue would remain off display and that the city would "take time to assess the historic meaning of the statue." Its future was deemed uncertain after it was put in storage. An Italian American group in Massachusetts called for the statue to be removed, saying that "Columbus can't represent us as Italian Americans anymore."

In October 2020, Mayor Walsh announced that the statue would be moved to a North Margin Street affordable housing development under construction by the Knights of Columbus.

== See also ==
- List of monuments and memorials to Christopher Columbus
