= William Franklin Cheney =

William Franklin Cheney (October 6, 1847 – December 4, 1931) was an American Episcopal priest who led the Church of the Good Shepherd in Dedham, Massachusetts.

Cheney was graduated from Harvard University in 1873. He was ordained to the diaconate at the Church of the Holy Trinity in Philadelphia on June 22, 1876. He was consecrated a priest at the Church of the Good Shepherd by Bishop Benjamin Henry Paddock on June 5, 1877. The Chapel of All Saints at Good Shepherd is dedicated to Cheney.

Cheney was a family genealogist and married Lucy Chickering Cheney, a descendant of Francis Chickering, in 1881. (Note: Lucy died suddenly in 1887.) He lived on Walnut Street in Dedham and was said to be revered not only by the members of his own congregation but by his fellow townsmen of other faiths. William B. Gould IV wrote that he "was spoken of in reverential terms" in his childhood home.

When the cornerstone of the Oakdale School was laid in 1902, Cheney led the crowd in prayer.

== Works cited ==
- Cheney, Rev. William Franklin (1927). The Chickering-Alleyne family : a paper before the Dedham Historical Society. Boston: Thomas Todd Co.
- Convention of the Protestant Episcopal Church in the Diocese of Massachusetts (1877). Journal of the Eighty-Seventh Annual Meeting of the Convention of the Protestant Episcopal Church in the Diocese of Massachusetts. Diocesan House.
- Gould IV, William B. (2002). Diary of a Contraband: The Civil War Passage of a Black Sailor (paperback ed.). Stanford University Press. ISBN 0-8047-4708-3.
- Neiswander, Judith (2024). Mother Brook and the Mills of East Dedham. Damianos Publishing. ISBN 978-1-941573-66-2.
