= Samuel Haven (judge) =

American judge

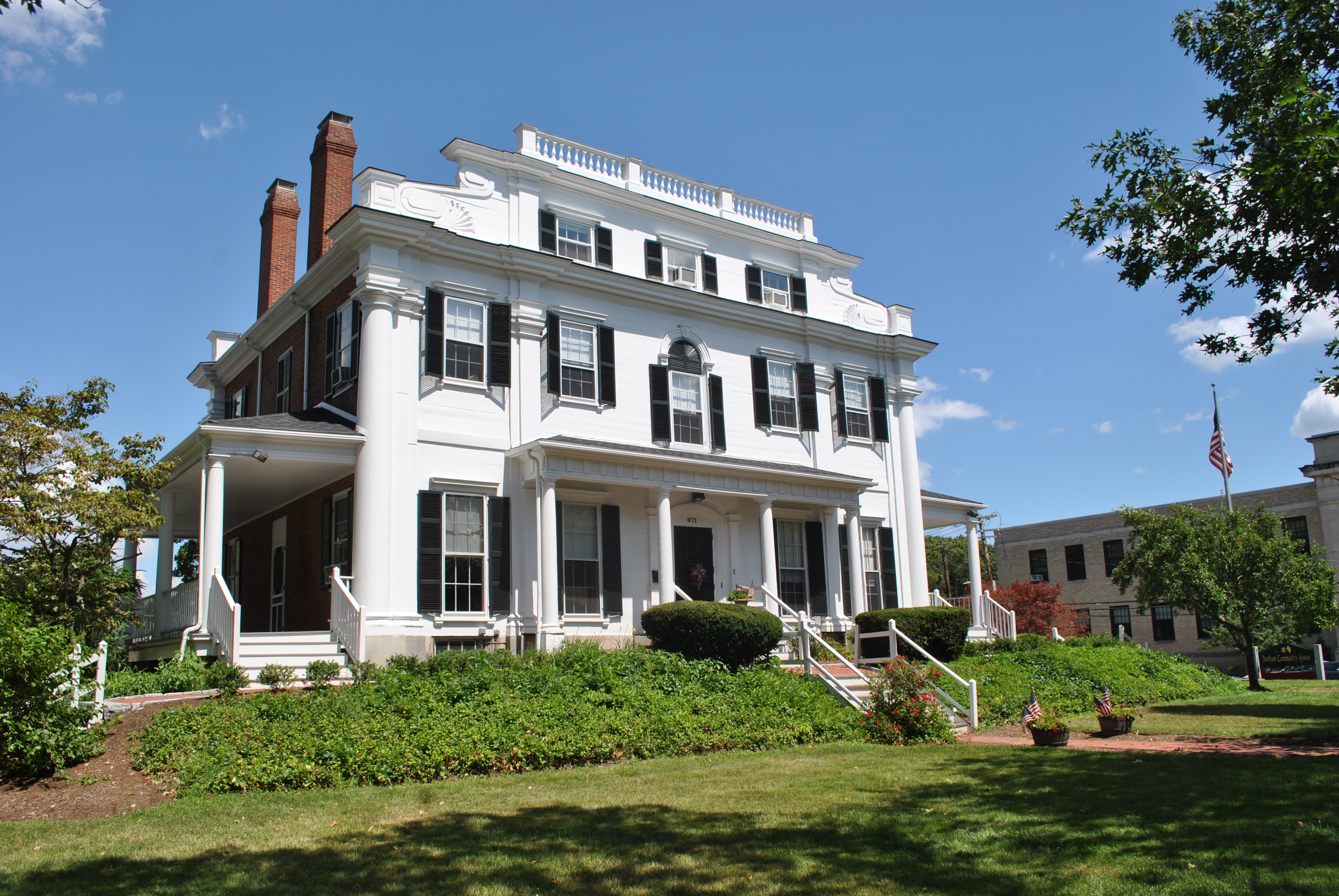
Haven's house

Samuel Haven (April 5, 1771 – September 4, 1847) was an American judge.

== Personal life ==
Haven was the son of Jason Haven and the grandson of Samuel Dexter through his daughter, Catherine. He was born April 5, 1771, in Dedham. On March 6, 1799, he married Elizabeth Craigie Foster in Dedham.

He attended Harvard College as a member of the class of 1789 and then studied law with Fisher Ames and Samuel Dexter. Haven was the father of Samuel Foster Haven. He died in Roxbury on September 4, 1847, at the home of his daughter, Catharine Dexter Haven Hilliard. Later in life he would become a member of the Swedenborgian Church.

Haven Street in Dedham was named for him and his father.

=== House ===
In 1798, he built a house designed by Charles Bulfinch kitty-corner from the Norfolk County Courthouse that is today the Dedham Community House. It was built on land originally owned by his father and maternal grandfather. It was noted as one of the most hospitable houses of the day in Massachusetts. The Havens entertained many distinguished guests, including Richard Henry Dana Sr., Elizabeth Peabody, Nathaniel Hawthorne and his wife, Horace Mann and his wife, Oliver Wendell Holmes Sr., Oliver Wendell Holmes Jr., Washington Allston and his wife, Charles Folsom and his wife, and Judge Theron Metcalf and his wife. The house is mentioned in The Life of Nathaniel Hawthorne by Julian Hawthorne.

== Career ==
Haven studied law under Fisher Ames.

When Norfolk County was created, he was appointed Register of Probate in 1793 over Nathaniel Ames. He held that role until 1833. In 1802, he was appointed a judge of the Court of Common Pleas and was made chief justice in 1804 until the court's disbanding in 1811. In addition to being a lawyer and judge, he was also a horticulturist and mechanician. He was also involved with the creation of the Dedham Bank.

== Split at First Church ==
=== Selection of Alvan Lamson ===
Haven opposed the selection of Alvan Lamson as minister at First Church and Parish in Dedham. The selection split the church, with many congregants leaving to form the Allin Congregational Church.

A council of 13 other churches assembled with the minister and one lay delegate from each participating to consider the appointment. The council heard a report from the parish first and then heard the long (Note: It is estimated to have taken over one hour to deliver.) and carefully prepared argument of Haven.

Haven argued that a church should be able to elect its own pastor and that an ecclesiastical council should not be able to force a Gospel minister upon a church without its consent. Haven also noted that the tradition in New England had long been for a church to make a selection and then present its choice to the parish for ratification. Ordinations, he said, are ecclesiastical events, not civil ones. Additionally, councils are called by churches, Haven said, not by secular authorities. To have the Dedham parish convene this council was to confuse secular and religious authority.

The letters calling for the council asked for the other church's help "in the ordination of Mr. Lamson, as a Gospel Minister over the Church and Society constituting said Parish." After hearing Haven's argument, Chickering backtracked and said they did not ask for Lamson be ordained over the church. Chickering then presented letters showing that if all the members of the church had been present when the vote was taken that there would have been a majority in favor of Lamson. The council was not inclined to consider the views and membership status of the absent members and instead considered Lamson's qualifications.

At the end of the day, the council declared that it would proceed to ordain Lamson on the following day.

=== Haven's pamphlet ===
Haven published a book of over 100 pages outlying the argument against Lamson and included the Result from each council. His name did not appear on it, but it was an open secret who wrote it after it was published in March 1819.

In it, he used derogatory and insulting language to describe his opponents. He also said that bringing Lamson to the church was "both disgusting and ridiculous." He added that the more liberal members who favored Lamson had deliberately stirred up the community and that the meeting on July 13, in which Lamson's stay in the pulpit was extended, was "a farce" marked by "management, intrigue, and deceit." Haven also blamed the dispute as the cause of Deacon Joseph Swan's death. Haven characterized the church meeting in which Lamson was admitted as a member as a "shocking profanation" exhibiting "scenes of wickedness... indecency and barbarity."

In Haven's telling, Chickering was one of the central "plotters" in the whole ordeal. Chickering then attempted to sue Haven for libel, but a grand jury in Norfolk County refused to indict Haven in October 1820. Chickering then tried in Cambridge, where the pamphlet was printed, and a Middlesex Grand Jury did indict him. Haven was arrested on December 1, 1819. Due in part to the long speech Haven gave in his own defense, the trial lasted over two days. (Note: It is thought the Daniel Webster may have assisted Haven.)

Haven argued that he could not have possibly insulted "Alvan Lamson, pastor of the First Church and Parish in Dedham" as he did not think anyone existed by that description. As a member of that church, Haven said, he would have expected his pastor to "admonish me in the spirit of Christian meekness," but in the eight months since the pamphlet was published he had not received any such admonitions. Haven was acquitted.

== Works cited ==
- Hanson, Robert Brand (1976). Dedham, Massachusetts, 1635-1890. Dedham Historical Society.
- Knudsen, Harold M. (2025). Fisher Ames, Christian Founding Father & Federalist. Liberty Hill Publishing.
- Smith, Frank (1936). A History of Dedham, Massachusetts. Transcript Press, Incorporated.
- Wright, Conrad (1988). "The Dedham Case Revisited". Proceedings of the Massachusetts Historical Society. 3. 100. Massachusetts Historical Society: 15–39. JSTOR 25080991.
