= Samuel Foster Haven =

American archeologist and anthropologist

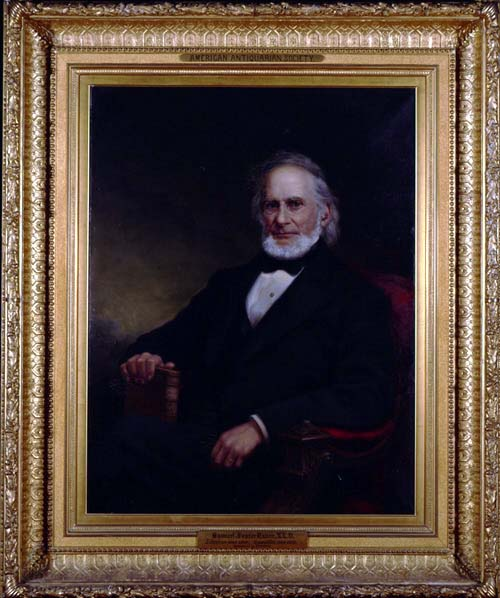
- Born: May 28, 1806; Dedham
- Died: September 5, 1881 (aged 75); Worcester
- Alma mater: Harvard Law School; Amherst College
- Occupation: Lawyer; archaeologist; writer; librarian; observer
- Organization: American Antiquarian Society

Signature
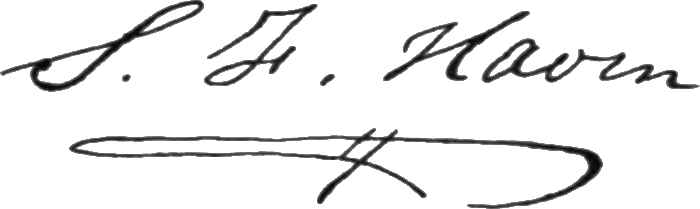

Samuel Forster Haven (May 28, 1806 – September 5, 1881) was an American archeologist and anthropologist.

== Biography ==
Haven was born to Judge Samuel and Betsy Haven in Dedham, Massachusetts on May 28, 1806. He took a degree from Amherst College, then studied law at Harvard Law School, and then commenced a legal practice in Dedham and Lowell, Massachusetts.

Haven had a keen interest in the history of New England before the Revolution, and began publishing papers in 1836. His interest then turned towards the archeology of the Americas.

In September 1837 he was appointed librarian of the American Antiquarian Society, located in Worcester, Massachusetts. He began his duties as librarian in April 1838, and in October of that same year, he was elected a member of the society. Haven became one of the society's longest serving librarians from 1838 to 1881, and also served on its board of councilors from 1855 to 1881. Haven was particularly interested in research of the indigenous people of North America, including those referred to as the Mound Builders.

He was elected as a member of the American Philosophical Society in 1865.

The Smithsonian Institution commissioned Haven to write a consolidation of then current archeological knowledge. The Institution published Haven's Archaeology of the United States in 1855. It was his only book. The result of his travels and studies, it proposed an ancient origin of the native peoples of the Americas and of their migration from Siberia.

Haven died in Worcester on September 5, 1881.
