= Hannah B. Chickering =

American prison reformer (1817–1879)

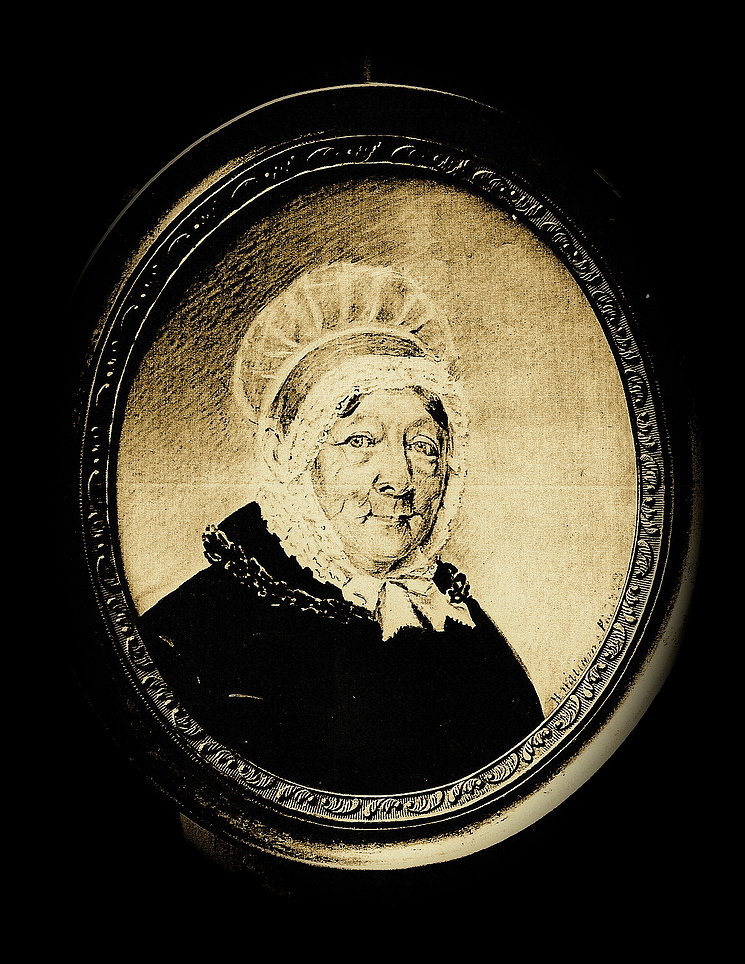
- Born: 29 July 1817 Dedham, Massachusetts, U.S.
- Died: 3 July 1879 (aged 61)

Hannah B. Chickering (July 29, 1817 – July 3, 1879) was a prison reformer in the late 19th-century, who worked to establish separate prisons for female inmates in Massachusetts and founded the Temporary Asylum for discharged female prisoners which later became known as the Dedham Temporary Home for Women and Children, which operated between 1864 and 1969 in Dedham, MA. Chickering Road in Dedham is named for her.

== Early life ==
Born on July 29, 1817, in Dedham, Massachusetts, Chickering was the youngest of seven children and the fourth daughter in her family. Her father was Jabez Chickering and she was a descendant of Francis Chickering.

Although she was raised in the Unitarian faith, she ultimately decided to become an Episcopalian. (Note: Her brother, Horatio, was a founder of the Church of the Good Shepherd.) She was a devoted member of her church, participated in parish work, and taught the local children during Sunday School. Chickering's faith and unyielding belief in God would provide strength throughout her life and guidance in her work.

In 1846, around the age of 29, Chickering moved to Philadelphia, Pennsylvania, where she continued her role in the church teaching Sunday School to young girls. One of her students, wrote this of a young Chickering, "Before knowing Miss Chickering I rather feared her. She seemed to me and others of our set of girls rather stern and strict. And I must confess it was with feelings of dread that we accepted her as our Sunday-school teacher. Very soon, however, this all changed, and as we knew her so we loved and respected her. If one was candid and honest with her there was nothing to fear."

Sometime around 1854, Chickering moved back to Dedham, Massachusetts where she spent her days caring for the ill, it was during this time when she decided that her life's work should be toward promoting the good in other people. In "Recollections of Hannah B. Chickering," Sarah E. Dexter described Chickering as a woman with "...a strong element of self-sacrifice united to the utmost fidelity to duty. Her question was always, What ought I to do?" Chickering would discover the answer a few years later while on a return visit to Philadelphia, Pennsylvania to see a close friend.

== Dedham temporary home for women and children ==
In the early 1860s, Chickering visited a friend in Philadelphia, who once a week spent an afternoon with the female prisoners of the Pennsylvania State Penitentiary. Chickering requested to join her friend on her visit to the Penitentiary one Tuesday afternoon, to help uplift the spirits of the women through prayer and religious teachings. In a letter written by the friend about the visit she remarked how Chickering, "...at once became warmly interested in the work and never afterwards during her whole visit failed to devote the Tuesday afternoons to it with an enthusiasm and hopefulness...". Once Chickering returned to her home in Dedham, Massachusetts, she sought to continue the work she had begun in Philadelphia with the women prisoners of the Dedham Jail. Initially, Chickering had fears the female prisoners in the Dedham Jail would not take warmly to her company or teachings, but these fears dissipated after her first few visits. Soon Chickering became a regular at the Dedham Jail, when she arrived each Sunday the women awaited eagerly for their weekly religious lesson. Overtime Chickering established herself in the Jail's community, setting up a library and appointed herself as the prison's chaplain.

During these visits in the Dedham Jail, Chickering begun to realize that the female prisoners were not receiving any rehabilitation efforts afforded to the male prisoners. There were no programs that prepared the women for their release back into society, which resulted in the women resorting to their old methods of survival, crime, resulting in their re-arrest and imprisonment. Chickering observed the cycle repeat itself and its effect on the women, "...and this mournful round is trodden again and again, till a wretched death closes the scene for these victims of misfortune, neglect, and sin." From what she had seen first hand in the Dedham Jail, Chickering realized there was desperate need to reform these women so they could lead productive lives once they were released from prison. What transpired was the "Temporary Asylum for Discharged Female Prisoners," founded 1864, referred today as the "Dedham Temporary Home for Women and Children."

The Asylum officially open its doors on November 15, 1864, its first residents were women recently released from the Dedham Jail, and as of 1881 Sarah Dexter wrote "...nearly one thousand women and one hundred children have been received into its shelter." Chickering choose a 25-acre farm in Dedham on which to operate the Asylum that she reportedly acquired for a low purchase price. On the property was a large residential home, barn, and many outbuildings scattered throughout the 25 acres. The main goal of the Asylum was to rebuild the self-confidence of the women, so that they would not only respect themselves but also respect the society they were working towards re-entering. Chickering and the matrons also worked to help find the discharged female prisoners secure forms of employment before leaving the Asylum. To aid in this, the women would learn basic domestic skills, which would help them get jobs cleaning local businesses, and in private residences. The property would later be renamed the Chickering House in her honor.

== Work in Massachusetts prison reform ==
Chickering in addition to helping facilitate the rehabilitation of women at the Dedham Asylum, continued to visit women in prisons and correctional institutions all over the State of Massachusetts. During her visits, Chickering continued to witness the lack of reform, degrading treatment and minimal security provided to female inmates, particularly the treatment of female prisoners at the hands of male guards as well as the male inmates caught her attention. Chickering argued that treatment of women prisoners by the officers and male inmates was degrading, a term used specifically by 19th century women prison reformers to reference acts of rape and sexual assault. For these reasons, Chickering saw the urgent need for separate prison facilities for women, which she argued should employ an all female staff to ensure not only protection from sexual attack, but to facilitate the rehabilitation programs for the female prisoners during their incarceration. On November 27, 1869, Chickering held a public meeting at St. Paul's Chapel in Dedham, to propose the need for separate prisons for women, it was at this meeting that a committee of five men and two women was formed to help see Chickering's proposal realized. The Committee finally presented their proposed plan for a women's prison on February 24, 1871, at a hearing before the Massachusetts Legislative Prison Committee at the State House in Boston. The bill for separate prisons for women finally passed 1874, after previously being defeated many times and many signed petitions, Chickering had succeeded in her efforts. However, Chickering's work was not over, as she was very involved in the execution and planning of what would ultimately be the opening in 1877 of the Reformatory of Women at Sherborn, MA.

== Final years ==
Soon after the opening of the Reformatory in Sherborn, it was apparent that Chickering's health was in decline, but according to friends retiring from her work was far from an easy task for Chickering. Even at the end of her life, Chickering would not accept praise or take credit for the success of her work in prison reform or the Asylum, as she refused to allow her picture to be hung in the farm house even at the request of the matrons who now ran the facility in Dedham. Chickering died on July 3, 1879, in her home, and the funeral was held two days later at the Church of the Good Shepard at Oakdale in Dedham. The female inmates of her beloved Asylum were in attendance to a mourn a woman who many of them regarded as a "best friend." The Temporary Asylum in Dedham would remain in operation until 1969 when it closed, the same year The Chickering Foundation was established to fund various charities and organizations, to carry on Chickering's legacy of self-service for the good of others.

Part of the land on which the Asylum stood now is home to the Baby Cemetery, which is the final resting place of children born to women at the Asylum.

== Works cited ==
- Neiswander, Judith (2024). Mother Brook and the Mills of East Dedham. Damianos Publishing. ISBN 978-1-941573-66-2.
