= Norfolk County Courthouse (1795) =

Courthouse in Massachusetts, United States

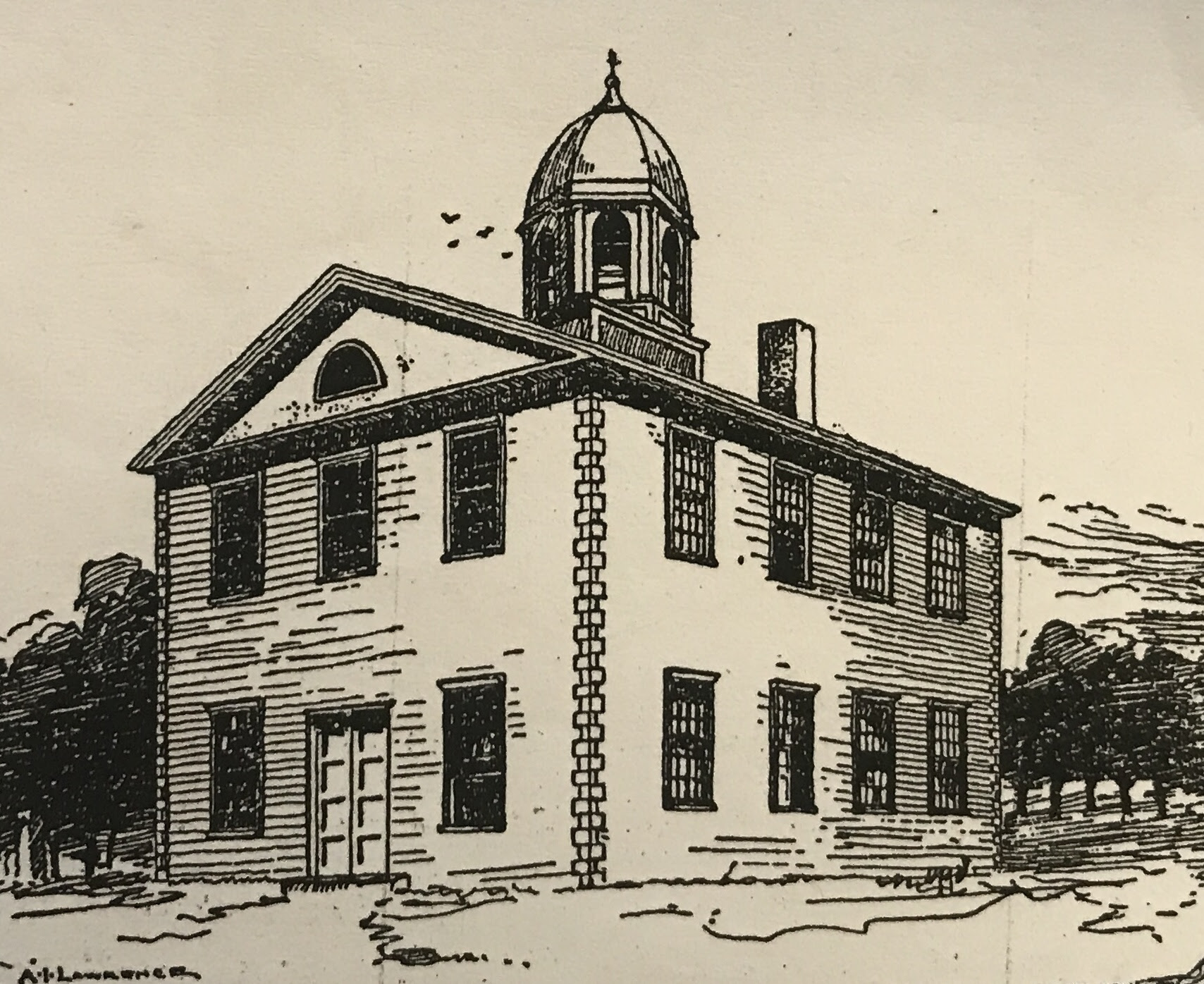
Norfolk County Courthouse

The Norfolk County Courthouse served Norfolk County, Massachusetts from soon after its establishment in 1792 until 1827. It was replaced by a new Norfolk County Courthouse. In later years, the building was known as Temperance Hall.

== History ==
After the creation of the county, the Court of Common Pleas and the Court of General Sessions of the Peace first met in Dedham's meetinghouse. Nathaniel Ames was chosen as the clerk of both and they met for the first time on September 23. (Note: Hanson is not clear in which year they first met.)

When the court met on January 7, 1794, it was so cold in the building, which lacked any sort of heating, that they moved to the Woodward Tavern across the street. The Anglican Church in town had also offered their building, but it was in such a state of disrepair that the offer was not accepted. The First Church and Parish in Dedham then offered a piece of land on their Little Common, and a new courthouse was ordered to be constructed. Construction was sluggish, however, and the delays frustrated Ames.

The court was still sitting in the meetinghouse in 1794 but the new courthouse was completed in 1795. It was found to be too small, however, and the ceilings were so low as to stifle people in the courtrooms. Charles Bulfinch was hired in 1795 to design a turret for the building and Paul Revere was commissioned to cast a bell. (Note: The bell was moved to the new courthouse, and the last record of the cupola was in 1817. It disappeared sometime after that.)

In 1827, it was sold at public auction. The first floor was then used as a millinery shop and residence while the second had an assembly room. In 1845, it was sold again to the Temperance Hall Association and burned down on April 28, 1891.

== The Fairbanks case ==
The first major trial to be held at the new courthouse was that of Jason Fairbanks. He lived in the family homestead on East Street and was courting Elizabeth Fales, two years his junior at 18. Jason had told a friend that "planned to meet Betsey, in order to have the matter settled" and that he "either intended to violate her chastity, or carry her to Wrentham, to be married, for he had waited long enough." On May 21, 1801, Fales met Fairbanks in a "birch grove next to 'Mason’s Pasture'" and told him that she could not marry him.

Fales was stabbed 11 times, including once in the back, and her throat was slashed. Fairbanks staggered to her home, covered in blood, and told her family that she had committed suicide. He also told them that he had also attempted to take his own life, but was unable to, and that accounted for his wounds which left him "still alive, but in a most deplorable situation." The editor of the local paper, Herman Mann, was called to the scene and reported the incident in the next edition of his weekly newspaper under the headline "MELANCHOLY CATASTROPHE!"

Fairbanks' murder trial opened on August 5, 1801, at the Courthouse but interest in the case involving two prominent families was so great that the trial was moved to the First Parish Meetinghouse across the street. When that venue proved to still be too small, the trial again moved to the Town Common. Prosecuting the case was the then-Attorney General and later Governor James Sullivan and defending Fairbanks was future Boston mayor and US Senator, Harrison Gray Otis. The trial lasted three days after which Fairbanks was found guilty and sentenced to death by hanging. He escaped on August 18, at which time a $1,000 bounty offered for his capture and a newspaper implored readers to "Stop the Murderer!"

Fairbanks was captured in Skeensborough, New York as he attempted to escape to Canada. On September 10 he was returned to Dedham from the Boston jail and was hanged. To ensure that he would not escape again two Army Cavalry and one volunteer militia units stood guard. In addition to the military presence, "the 10,000 people who showed up at the Town Common to witness the execution were five times the town’s population at the time."

Within days of the execution the first of four installments of the Report of the Trial of Jason Fairbanks was published by the Boston firm Russell and Cutler. It was 87 pages long and was issued over the course of several months, making it "the first demonstrably popular trial report published in early national New England." A number of books and pamphlets would be written about the case in the months and years to come including "one of the earliest novels based on an actual murder case," the Life of Jason Fairbanks: A Novel Founded on Fact.

== Works cited ==
- Hanson, Robert Brand (1976). Dedham, Massachusetts, 1635-1890. Dedham Historical Society.

42.249°N 71.1769°W
