= Norfolk County Courthouse =

- U.S. National Register of Historic Places
- U.S. National Historic Landmark
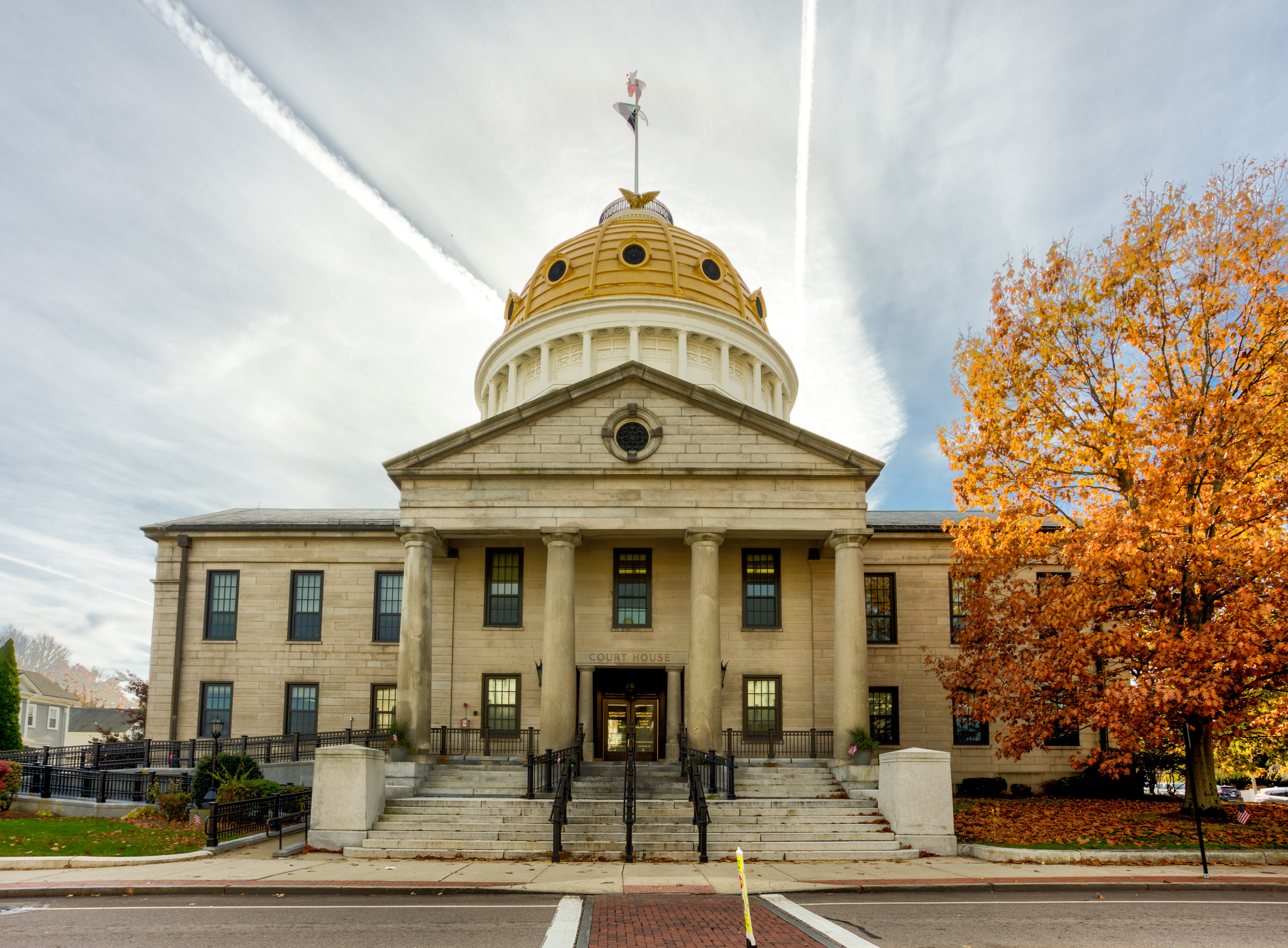

- Location within Massachusetts Location within the United States
- Location: Dedham, Massachusetts
- Coordinates: 42°14′55″N 71°10′36″W
- Built: 1827
- Architect: Willard, Solomon
- Architectural style: Greek Revival
- NRHP reference No.: 72001312

Significant dates
- Added to NRHP: November 28, 1972
- Designated NHL: November 28, 1972

The Norfolk County Courthouse, also known as the William D. Delahunt Courthouse, is a National Historic Landmark at 650 High Street in Dedham, Massachusetts. It currently houses the Norfolk County Superior Court. It is significant as a well-preserved Greek Revival courthouse of the 1820s, and as the site a century later of the famous Sacco-Vanzetti trial. The building was declared a National Historic Landmark in 1972, and is listed on the National Register of Historic Places. It replaced an earlier courthouse, built in 1795.

== Building ==
=== Original construction ===
When it became apparent that the old County Courthouse was out of date, the Norfolk County Commissioners ordered a new one to be built. They originally were seeking a utilitarian building that would be fireproof and safe to store important documents. Local boosters, however, wanted a building that aligned with the town's rapidly improving self-image. The commissioners were persuaded that

something more was required... than what was barely necessary; that... the state of this County, rapidly advancing in wealth and prosperity, required a liberal and judiciously expenditure for public accommodation, and that acquiring a taste for the fine arts was intimately connected with a refinement of manners and even with moral sentiment; that a magnificent temple of Justice would inspire an elevation of mind and contribute to cherish those feelings of reverence for the administration of the laws which it is so desirable to cultivate in a free community; the as the situation was in the most handsome and conspicuous place in the town, the building should be made in accordance with the architectural spirit of the times and comporting with the dignity and taste of the citizens of the County.

The land for the courthouse, across the street from the existing one, was purchased from Frances Ames for $1,200. Ames later refused to sell the lot to the east at an asking price of $400, however. Masonic ceremonies, bell ringing and cannon fire accompanied the laying of the cornerstone on July 4, 1825. In a cavity made in the cornerstone, a leaden box was deposited containing

1. The newspapers of the day.
2. Webster's address on Bunker Hill.
3. An account of that battle.
4. A miniature beaver hat of the latest fashion.
5. A marble keystone with Masonic emblems.
6. Specimens of marble paper.
7. A silver plate with an inscription.
8. A piece of the Forefather's Rock.

It was designed by Solomon Willard and was dedicated on February 20, 1827. It was a basic rectangular granite-walled structure, 48' by 98' and two stories tall, with Greek-temple porticoes at either end. Each 10' portico was supported by four Doric pillars. A bell made by Paul Revere was moved from the old courthouse to the new north portico, where it was tolled to announce court sessions.

The interior had a hall running through the center paved with brick. On the eastern side were the offices of the Country Treasurer and the Clerk of Courts. On the western side were the Registry of Deeds and Probate Court. The courtroom was upstairs and featured an arched ceiling. The high sheriff had a desk in the room.

From the outside it was an attractive building, but it was not a comfortable place to work. The only water was provided by a well on Court Street, and it did not have an adequate heating system. One employee complained that it was "barren and destitute of every convenience, demanded for health, comfort and decency." In 1846, an iron fence was installed around the perimeter.

=== Renovations ===
Renovations in 1854 added gas lights to the building and running water from an on-site well. Six years later, in 1860, the building was fireproofed to protect county records. (Note: The original design had brick floors on top of a layer of salt covering a wooden subfloor, providing little protection from a fire originating in the cellar.) A group of citizens petitioned the commissioners, asking them not to make any structural changes for fear of ruining the exterior aesthetics of the building. Despite this, the Commission decided to extend the north front of the building and to add wings on either side.

The wings were ornamented with corner pilasters, and were done with sensitivity to the original design. A dome was also added at that time; it would be replaced during further enlargements in the 1890s. (Note: It was rumored that the county saved money on the dome by using existing plans from the United States Customshouse in Providence.) Following plans developed by Gridley J. F. Bryant, the building was enlarged again between 1892 and 1895 to its present H-shaped configuration, adding wings to the southern facade that matched those added in 1863 to the north. The 1863 dome was replaced at that time with the present one, and the interior of the building was given a decorative treatment with Greek motifs. The Revere bell was removed and donated to the Dedham Historical Society during this renovation.

The dome was renovated in 2021.

== Notable trials ==
=== Sacco and Vanzetti ===
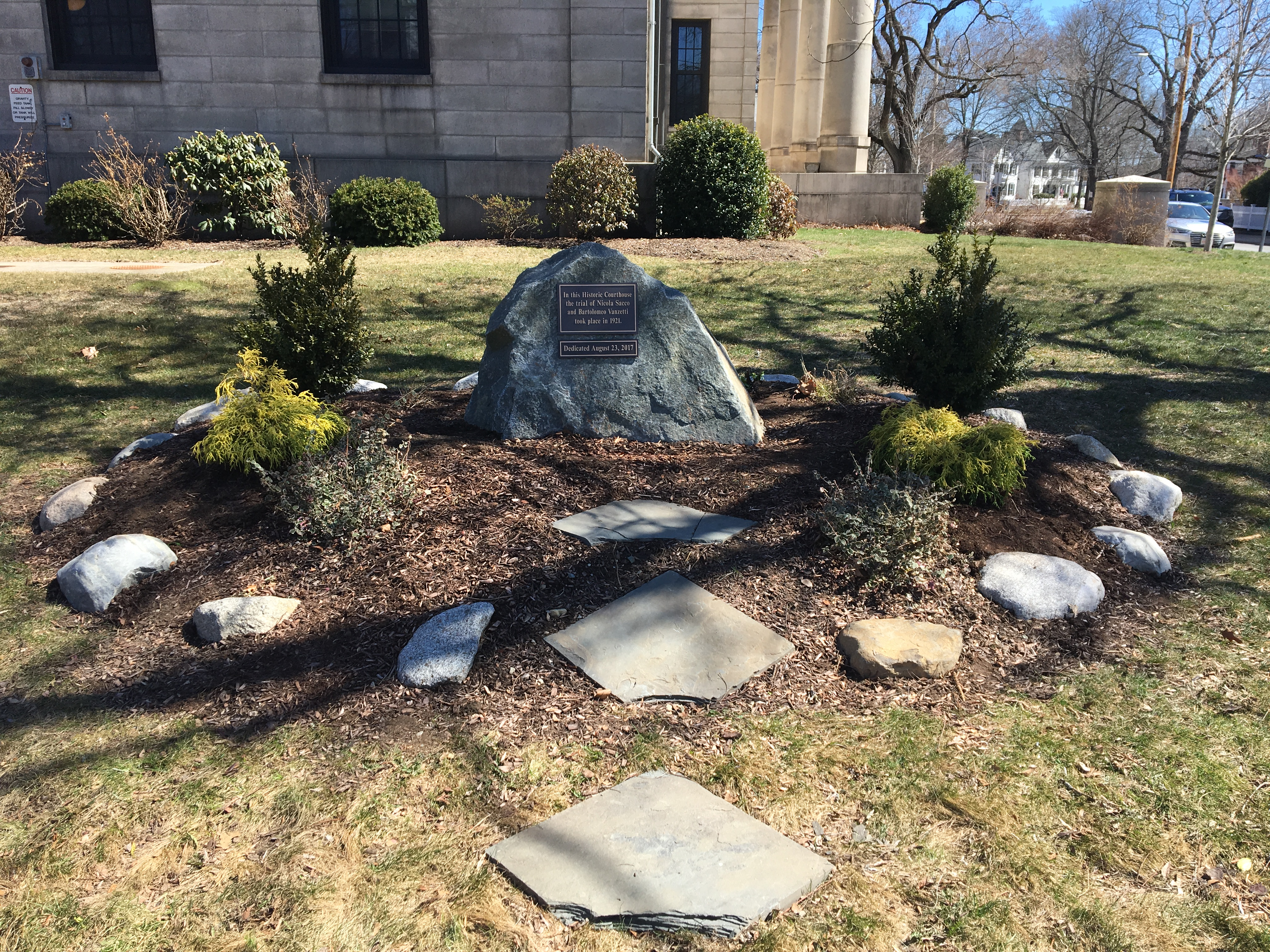
Monument recognizing the Sacco and Vanzetti trial outside the courthouse.

In May 1920 two Italian immigrants, Nicola Sacco and Bartolomeo Vanzetti, were arrested for a robbery that had taken place in South Braintree on April 20. In a highly charged trial which took place in this building, the two men proclaimed their innocence, and their leftist political views became a major element of the case. The two men were convicted and sentenced to death, causing an international outcry. After six years of legal wrangling, the two men were electrocuted in 1927.

The building has been relatively little altered since the time of the trial. Its most notable change is the removal from the courtroom of the cages that held the prisoners.

=== Karen Read ===
When Karen Read was on trial in 2024, charged with second-degree murder in the death of John O'Keefe in 2022, the case drew a great deal of media attention and protesters who believed Read was innocent and was being framed by the Canton Police Department. The judge in the case, Beverly Cannone, ordered a 200-foot (61 m) buffer zone to be established around the courthouse to "reduce the risk of exposing witnesses or jurors in this case to such outside influences."

=== Stefon Diggs ===
In May 2026, the assault trial of former New England Patriots wide receive Stefon Diggs got underway in the court.

== Other ==
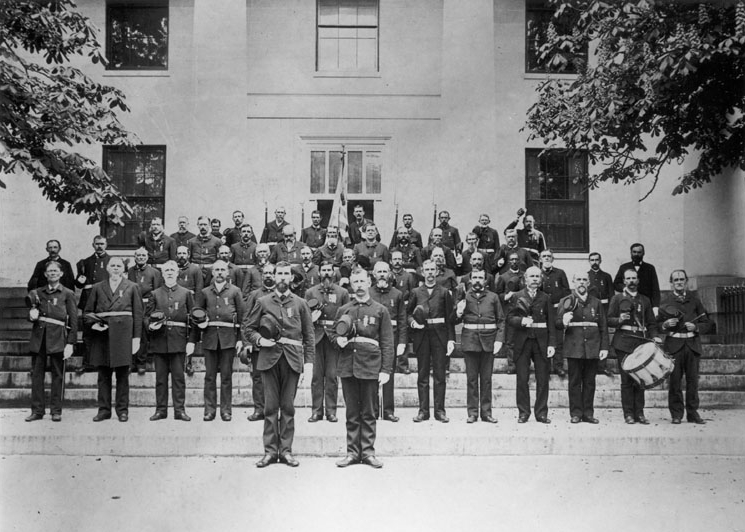
The Grand Army of the Republic's Charles W. Carroll Post 144 stands on the courthouse steps to celebrate the 250th Anniversary of the settlement of Dedham.

When Rufus Choate was arguing a case, the older students at Dedham High School would be dismissed from class to listen to his orations. From 1834 to 1847, the Dedham Institution for Savings was housed in the basement. In the mid-1800s, Ezra W. Sampson was the clerk of courts and George Alden was the court crier. For a time, the base of the Pillar of Liberty was moved to the northwest corner of the grounds.

In the mid-1800s, the Revere bell was tolled from the moment the judge was seen approaching on High Street until he was seated on the bench. When entering the courtroom, he was preceded by the sheriff, who carried a sword. When the judge was seated, the sheriff stood the sword (or occasionally a round white rod) upright in its standard and said "Court!" in a loud voice.

Television-Judge Joseph Wapner sat on the bench in the courthouse in July 1989 to film five episodes of The People's Court. Wapner heard "The Case of the Smelly Throw Pillows," "The Case of the Bad Windshield Replacement," and others.

On October 16, 2022, the courthouse was named in honor of William Delahunt, the former Norfolk County District Attorney. A ceremony was held across the street at the First Church and Parish in Dedham.

== See also ==
- List of National Historic Landmarks in Massachusetts
- National Register of Historic Places listings in Norfolk County, Massachusetts

== Works cited ==
- Austin, Walter (1912). Tale of a Dedham Tavern: History of the Norfolk Hotel, Dedham, Massachusetts. Priv. print. at the Riverside Press.
- Clarke, Wm. Horatio (1903). Mid-Century Memories of Dedham. Dedham Historical Society.
- Hanson, Robert Brand (1976). Dedham, Massachusetts, 1635-1890. Dedham Historical Society.
- Parr, James L. (2009). Dedham: Historic and Heroic Tales From Shiretown. The History Press. ISBN 978-1-59629-750-0.
