= Flag Day Parade =

Annual parade event in Dedham, Massachusetts

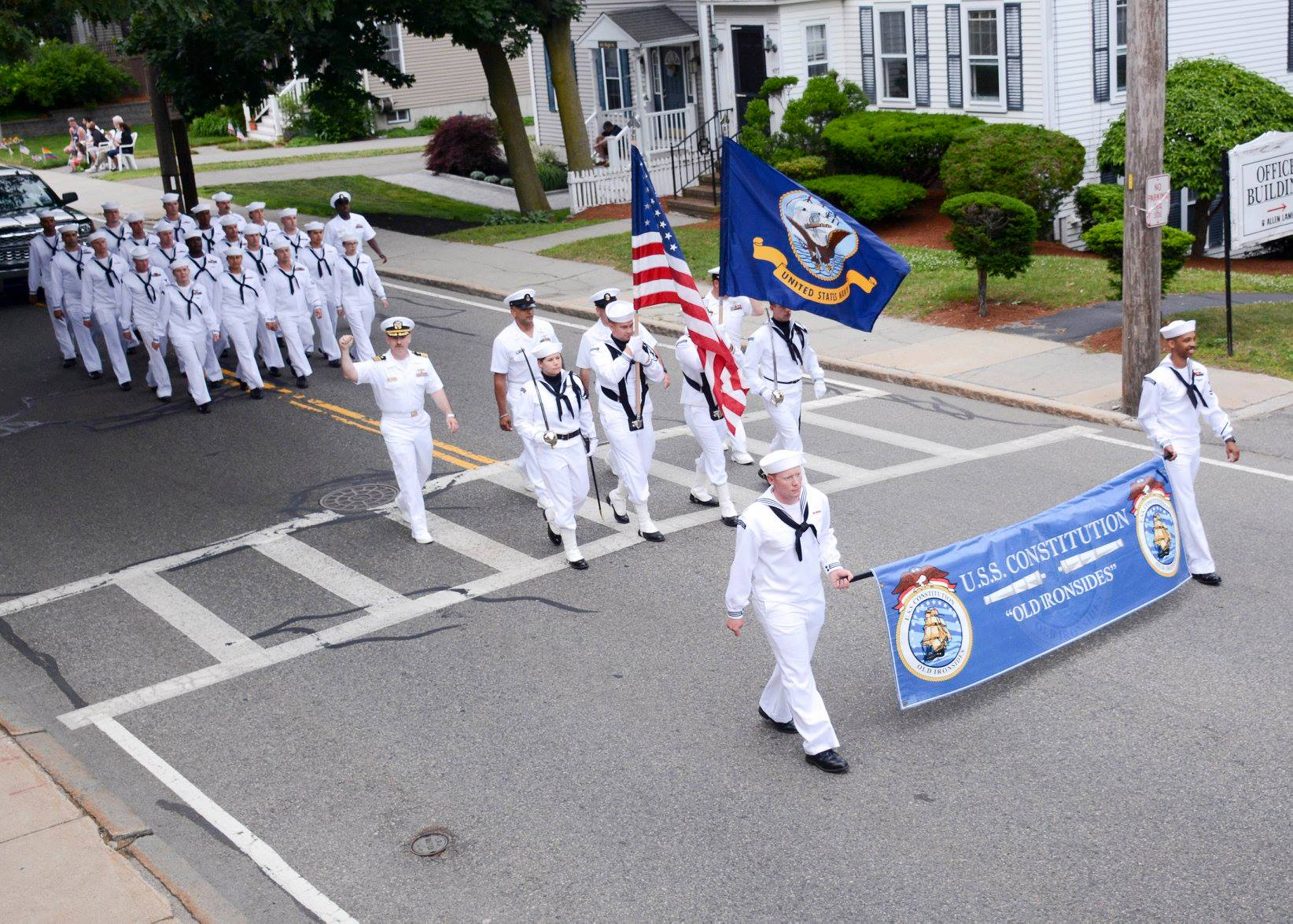
The crew of the USS Constitution marches in the Flag Day Parade.

The Flag Day Parade is an annual parade in Dedham, Massachusetts that celebrates Flag Day. The parade began in 1967 and quickly became one of Dedham's most beloved traditions.

The parade has occasionally rejected controversial floats. In 1975, the Parks and Recreation Commission unanimously refused to allow an anti-busing float during the nearby Boston desegregation busing crisis. In 1971, after Arthur "Mr. Wake Up America" Stivaletta claimed to be a co-sponsor of the parade, Recreation Director James E. Dunderdale publicly clarified that the Parks and Recreation Department was the only sponsor.

After Proposition 2½ led to the elimination of the Recreation Director position in 1980, Anthony "JuJu" Muccaccio took over the position for a year pro bono. He was then hired full time and began running the parade, an activity he continued even after his retirement in 2010.

In 2017, for the 50th anniversary, the parade was moved from the traditional June 14th to Saturday, June 17, to accommodate the fireworks at Memorial Park that were part of the celebration. The parade was nearly cancelled following the 2008 financial crisis, but a fundraising campaign saved it. During the COVID-19 pandemic, the parade was canceled in 2020 and 2021. In its place, an unofficial "rolling rally" of cars was held in its place along the same route.

In 2025, several months after the death of Mucciaccio, organizers decided not to name a Grand Marshall and instead dedicate the parade to his memory.

== Route ==
The parade takes the following route:

- Starts on East Street at Dedham Middle School,
- Proceeds down East street and left onto High Street,
- Follows High Street into Dedham Square past the Community Theater,
- Turns right onto Washington Street,
- Turns right onto Harris Street,
- Proceeds down High Street to East Dedham,
- Turns right on Milton Street,
- Turns right onto Walnut Street,
- Turns left onto Oakdale Avenue,
- Turns right onto Sanderson Avenue,
- Turns right onto Mt. Vernon Street,
- Turns left onto Whiting Avenue
- Parade ends at Memorial Park.

== Grand marshals ==
Year	Name	Notes
2009	Marie-Louise Kehoe	
2013	Kevin Hughes	
2015	Bob Aldous	
2023	Nancy Clement	
2024	Dennis Teehan, Sr.	
2025	Legacy of JuJu Mucciaccio	
