= Theron Metcalf =

American judge

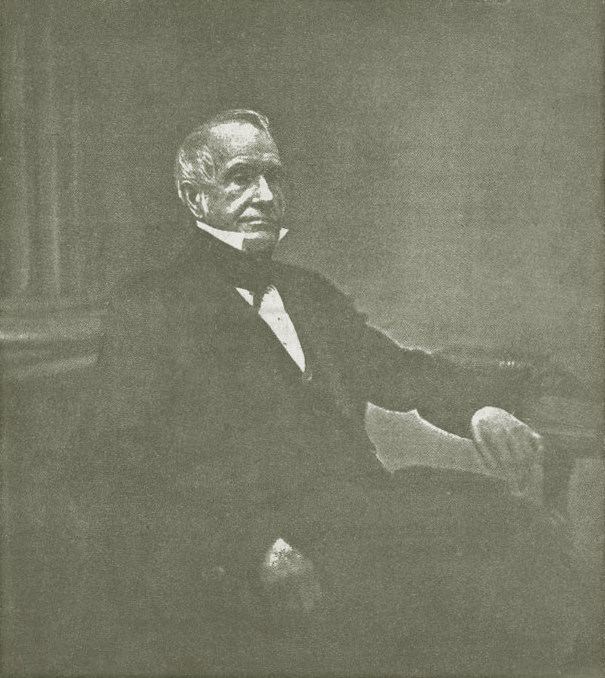

Associate Justice of the Massachusetts Supreme Judicial Court
- In office 1848–1865
- Appointed by: George N. Briggs
- Preceded by: Vacant
- Succeeded by: James Colt

Personal details
- Born: October 16, 1784 Franklin, Massachusetts, U.S.
- Died: November 12, 1875 (aged 91) Boston, Massachusetts, U.S.
- Spouse: Julia Tracy Metcalf
- Relations: Uriah Tracy
- Children: 3
- Education: Brown University; Litchfield Law School; Harvard University
- Profession: Attorney; Politician

Theron Metcalf (October 16, 1784 – November 12, 1875) was an American attorney and politician from Massachusetts. He was a New England jurist and served as an associate justice of the Massachusetts Supreme Judicial Court.

== Personal life ==
Metcalf was born in Franklin, Massachusetts, the son of Hanan Metcalf and Mary (Allen) Metcalf. He graduated from Brown University in 1805, and studied law at the Litchfield Law School after graduation.

On November 5, 1809, he married Julia Tracy, daughter of United States Congressman Uriah Tracy. Metcalf and his wife had three children: George Tracy Metcalf, William Pitt Metcalf and Julia Metcalf. Metcalf died in Boston, Massachusetts on November 12, 1875.

== Career ==
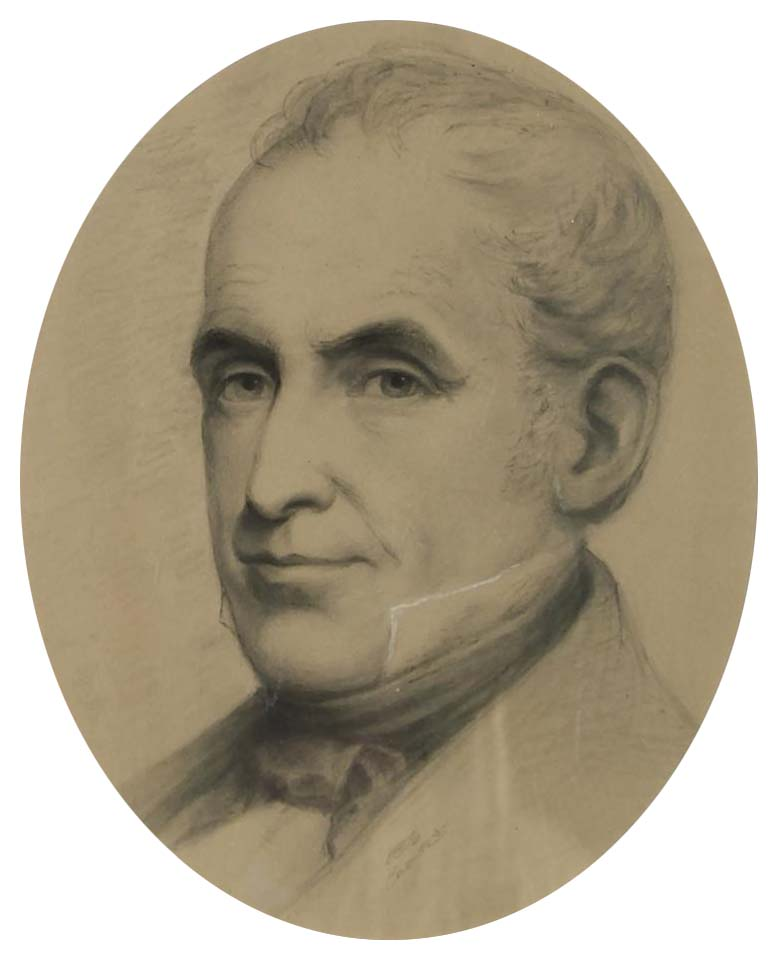
Drawing of Theron Metcalf

Metcalf edited the Dedham Gazette from 1813 to 1819. The editor was Jabez Chickering.

=== Legal ===
He opened a law school in Dedham in 1828 where he gave lectures. He was appointed Reporter of the Massachusetts Supreme Court in 1839, and sat on the bench of that court from February 24, 1848, until his resignation on August 31, 1865. His annotations were considered valuable for their philosophical investigation and discriminating analysis.

He was admitted to the bar in Massachusetts in 1807, and moved to Dedham, Massachusetts in 1809 to practice law. He served as Norfolk County Attorney for twelve years, until the position was eliminated.

Metcalf defended the arsonist who admitted to burning down the Phoenix Hotel. In the case of Baker v. Fales, he served alongside Samuel Haven in representing a group of church members who objected to the hiring of a minister at the First Church and Parish in Dedham.

=== Political ===
In 1815, he was appointed Reporter of Contested Elections for that year. In 1831, 1833 and 1834, he served as a member of the Massachusetts House of Representatives, and was chairman of the Judiciary Committee.

== Honors ==
Brown gave him the degree of LL.D. in 1844, and Harvard University did the same in 1848. He was elected a member of the American Antiquarian Society in 1844.

In 1832 and 1847, he was elected a fellow of Brown University. He delivered an address before Phi Beta Kappa society of Brown in 1832, and in 1840 delivered the Fourth of July oration at Dedham. Metcalf donated a set of fifty volumes of ordination sermons that he had collected to Brown University.

== Published works ==
His publications include:

- A Digest of the Cases decided in the Supreme Judicial Court of Massachusetts from 1816 to 1823, including the Five last Volumes of Tyng's and the first of Octavius Pickering's Reports (Boston, 1825)
- An address to the Phi Beta Kappa Society of Brown University: Delivered 5th September, 1832
- Reports from 1840 till 1849 (13 vols., 1840–51)
- the first volume of Digest of Decisions of Courts of Common Law and Admiralty in the United States (1840)
- a Supplement to the Revised Statutes of Massachusetts till 1844, with Luther S. Cushing (1844)
- articles to The American Jurist on the "Law of Contracts."

== Edited works ==
His edited works include:

- Asahel Stearns and Lemuel Shaw, The General Laws of Massachusetts till 1822 (2 vols., 1823)
- George Maule and William Selwyn's Reports
- Russell on Crimes
- Starkie on Evidence
- Yelverton's Reports

== Works cited ==
- Hanson, Robert Brand (1976). Dedham, Massachusetts, 1635-1890. Dedham Historical Society.
- Smith, Frank (1936). A History of Dedham, Massachusetts. Transcript Press, Incorporated.

Legal offices
Vacant Title last held by Marcus Morton	Associate Justice of the Massachusetts Supreme Judicial Court; 1848–1865	Succeeded by James Colt
