= Charles Folsom =

American librarian (1794–1872)

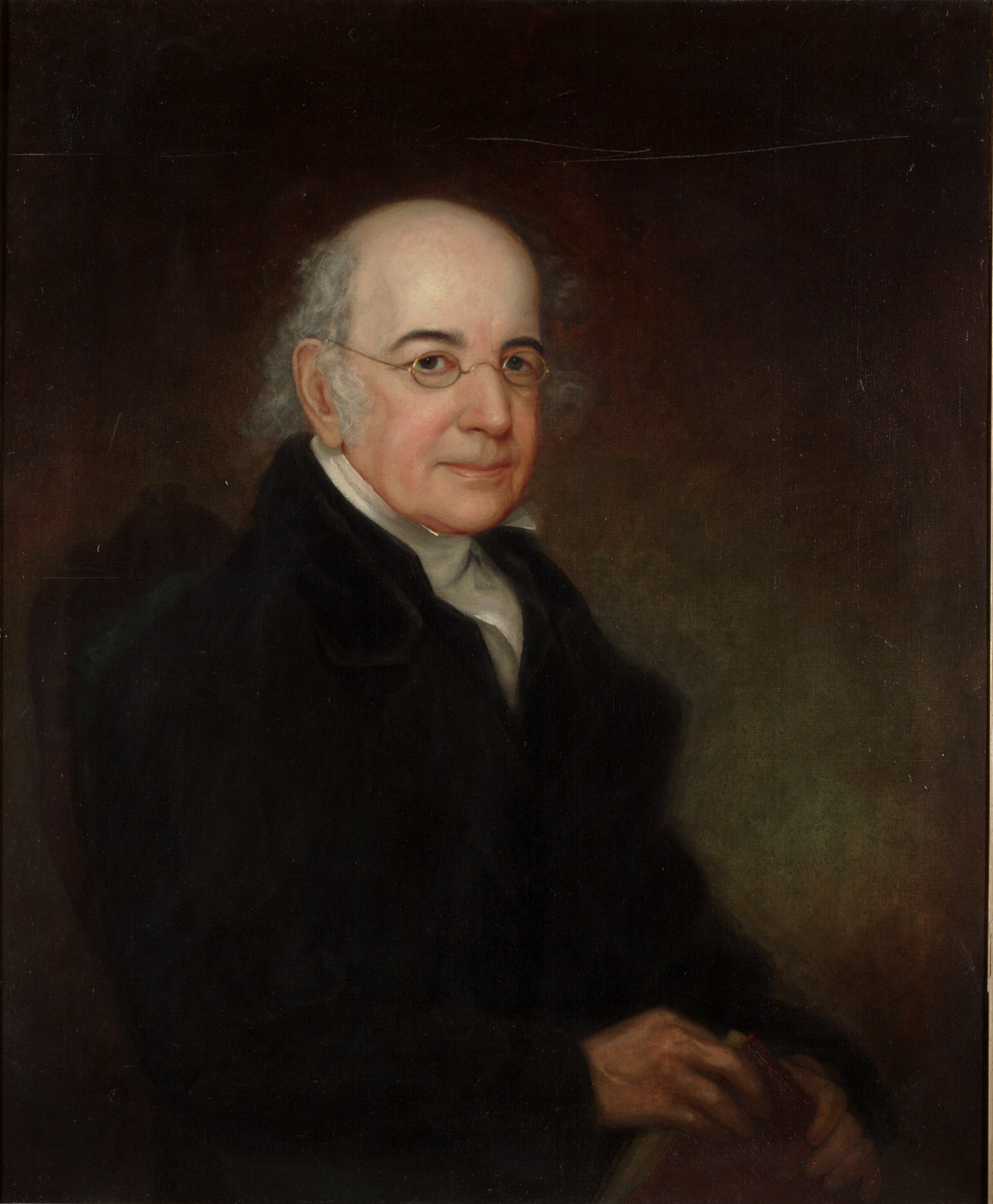
- portrait by William Edgar Marshall
- Born: December 24, 1794; Exeter
- Died: November 8, 1872 (aged 77); Cambridge
- Resting place: Mount Auburn Cemetery
- Alma mater: Harvard College
- Occupation: Librarian, university teacher
- Employer: Harvard College

Charles Folsom (December 24, 1794 – November 8, 1872) was a classical scholar, librarian, and editor. He was librarian at Harvard College from 1823 to 1826.

Folsom, born in Exeter, N. H., 24 December 1794, was the son of James and Sarah (Gilman) Folsom. After studying at Phillips Academy, Exeter, he entered Harvard in the sophomore class and graduated in 1813. During the winter vacations while an undergraduate and for the year after his graduation, he taught school. Returning to Cambridge the next year, he began to prepare himself for the ministry, but poor health forced him to give it up. Meanwhile, he was a proctor and regent in the college, and in 1816 received the degree of A.M. The same year he accepted an appointment as chaplain and instructor of mathematics on the U. S. ship Washington about to cruise in the Mediterranean. He remained abroad five years, part of the time serving as United States consul at Tunis (1817–19).

In 1821, he returned to Harvard and was chosen tutor in Latin, a position he kept until in September, 1823, he was made Librarian. By the direction of the Harvard Corporation he issued in 1824 a printed list of duplicates which were offered for sale at fixed prices. It was during his administration that greater freedom in the use of the Library began to be granted, especially to visiting scholars; and it was largely at his suggestion that the Library was thrown open "to all comers, with the implied assurance of welcome and aid." In 1826, he resigned the office and also the tutorship of Italian he had held for a year, in order to give his full-time to a position he had partly filled for a year or two, namely, corrector of the Harvard University Press. Yet his interest in the Library did not cease, for we find him apparently still in charge (in March, 1828) of the sale of duplicates as begun during his term, and he gave Benjamin Peirce able assistance in the preparation of the catalogue of 1830. The Greek motto prefixed to the catalogue of maps was suggested by him.

Writing but little himself, it was in such ways as this, giving unstintingly his own time and labor and accurate scholarship to the correction and revision of the work of others, that Charles Folsom exercised a decided influence in the world of letters. Sparks, Prescott, Quincy, and many other prominent authors were glad to acknowledge his skill and ever willing assistance. And so on the books which passed through his hands at the Press, it is said that his "passion for exact and minute accuracy," often led him to spend more time than had the authors themselves. Indeed, the pains he took in the verification of even the slightest details consumed so much time that he was finally obliged to resign his position, the press could not wait for him. In 1821, he had edited with William Cullen Bryant, the United States Literary Gazette, and ten years later he joined Professor Andrews Norton (Librarian, 1813–21) in editing the four volumes of the Select Journal of Foreign Periodical Literature. His only publications apart from those in periodicals were school editions of Livy and Cicero. He was frequently asked to write inscriptions, a species of composition for which he had great talent; those on the monuments to Presidents Dunster, Willard, and Webber in the Cambridge burying ground are from his pen.

Folsom was a member of the American Academy of Arts and Sciences, of the American Antiquarian Society, and of the Massachusetts Historical Society, and contributed a number of papers to their publications.

In 1841, moving to Boston, Folsom opened a school for young ladies. But at the end of four years he was elected Librarian of the Boston Athenaeum, then just entering its new building and widely extending its influence. Shortly before accepting this office he wrote to his friend S. A. Eliot a long letter giving his views, which were singularly advanced for the times, on libraries and librarians; "A letter," says Dr. Peabody, "which can hardly be transcended in simplicity, purity, and elegance of diction." Leaving the Athenaeum after a faithful and useful service of nearly eleven years, he returned to Cambridge to spend the remaining years of his life.

In Henry Wadsworth Longfellow's journal on April 9, 1847 - as transcribed and edited by his youngest brother Samuel A. Longfellow, he wrote:

"Proof-sheets of 'Evangeline' all tattooed with Folsom's marks. How severe he is ! But so much the better.

The footnote to this entry reads:

His friend, Mr. Charles Folsom, was then proof-reader at the printing-office where the book was set up.

He died, 8 November 1872, in his seventy-eighth year.

Charles Folsom married, 19 October 1824, Susanna Sarah, daughter of Rev. Joseph McKean, Boylston Professor of Rhetoric and Oratory. He had four children.
