= List of sheriffs of Norfolk County, Massachusetts =

This is a list of sheriffs of Norfolk County, Massachusetts. The sheriff is elected to serve a six-year term and oversees the Norfolk County House of Correction.

The current sheriff is Patrick W. McDermott.

No.	Sheriff	Picture	Term	Party	Note
1	Ebenezer Thayer		1793–1794		
2	Atherton Thayer		1794–1798		
3	Benjamin Clark Cutler		1798–1810		
4	Elijah Crane		1810–1811		
5	William Brewer		1811–1812		
6	Elijah Crane		1812–1834		
7	John Baker, II		1834–1843		
8	Jerauld N. E. Mann		1843–1848		
9	Thomas Adams		1848–1852	Whig	
10	John W. Thomas		1852 – 1853	Democratic	
11	Thomas Adams		1853 – January 1, 1857	Whig	
12	John W. Thomas		January 1, 1857 – January 1, 1878	Republican	First popularly elected sheriff of Norfolk County.
13	Rufus Corbin Wood		1878–1885	Republican	
14	Augustus Bradford Endicott		1885–1898	Republican	
15	Samuel Capen		1898–1939	Republican	
16	Samuel H. Wragg		1939–1959	Republican	Died in office
–	Edwin H. Downs		1959–1959		
17	Peter M. McCormack		1959–1961	Democrat	
18	Charles Hedges		1961–1975	Republican	
19	Clifford H. Marshall		1975–1996	Democrat	
20	John H. Flood		1996–1999	Republican	Flood was originally a Democrat was but appointed to the seat and ran as a Republican. He was defeated by Bellotti.
21	Michael G. Bellotti		1999–2018	Democratic	Resigned to become president of Quincy College.
–	Robert Harnais		October 2018 – December 2018		
22	Jerry McDermott		2018–2021	Republican	Was appointed by Gov. Charlie Baker
23	Patrick W. McDermott		2021–present	Democratic	Former Register of Probate (2002-2020). McDermott (D) ran against Jerry McDermott (R) in the 2020 election. The two are not related.
