= Peter McCormack =

Peter McCormack may refer to:

- Peter McCormack (footballer) (born 1956), Australian rules footballer
- Peter McCormack (handballer) (1923–2008), Gaelic handball player
- Peter M. McCormack (1919–1988), member of the Massachusetts Senate
- Pete McCormack (born 1965), Canadian author, filmmaker, and musician

== See also ==
- Peter McCormick, English lawyer.
- Peter Dodds McCormick, Australian composer
