= Massachusetts House of Representatives' 6th Norfolk district =

American legislative district

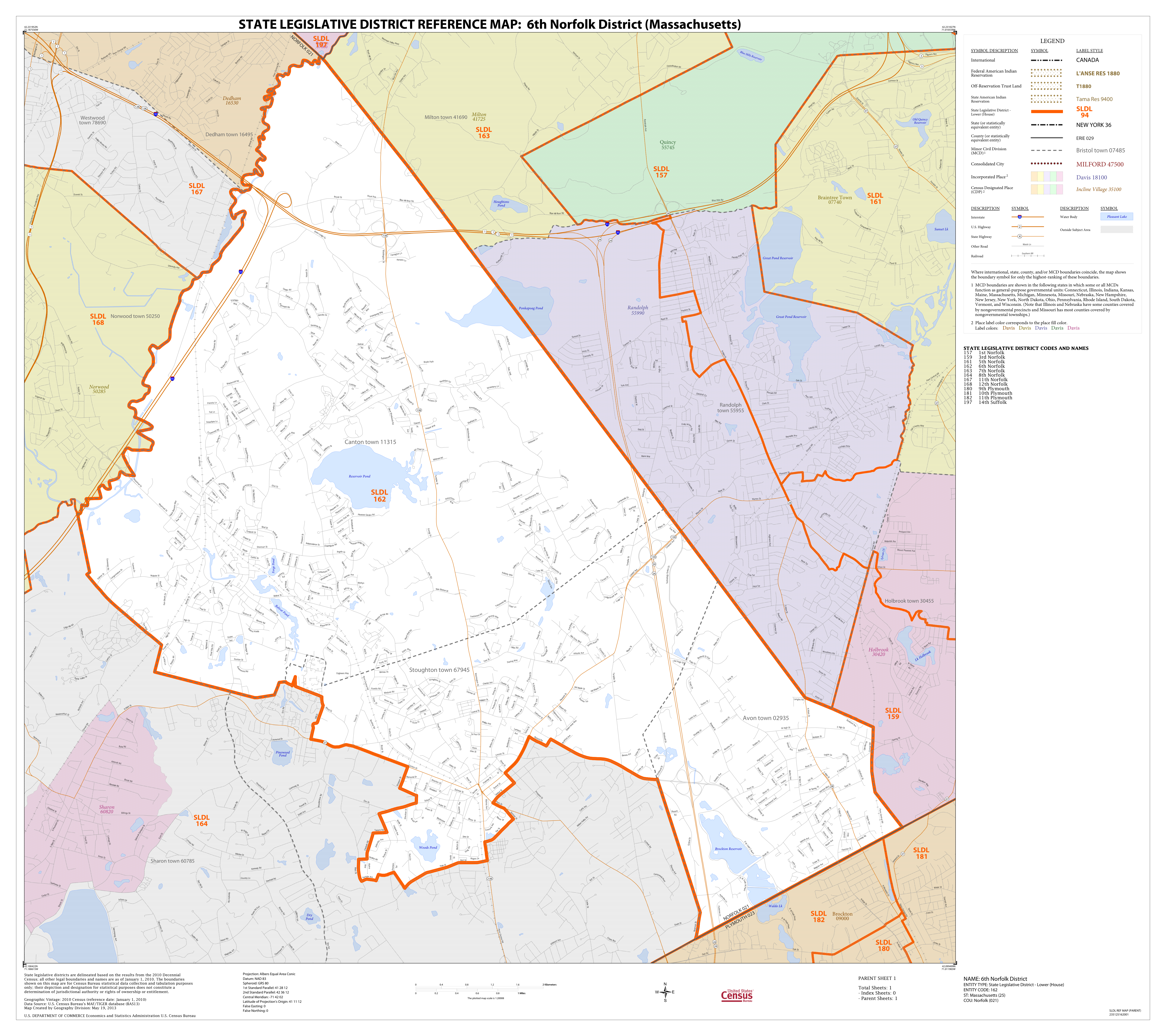
Map of Massachusetts House of Representatives' 6th Norfolk district, based on the 2010 United States census.

Massachusetts House of Representatives' 6th Norfolk district in the United States is one of 160 legislative districts included in the lower house of the Massachusetts General Court. It covers part of Norfolk County. Democrat William Galvin of Canton has represented the district since 1991.

== 2020 Democratic Primary ==
Incumbent William Galvin has been opposed in the democratic primary for the first time in over a decade by Tamisha Civil. The election is set to occur on September 1, 2020, with early voting and mail-in voting options offered in greater variety due to COVID-19.

== Towns represented ==
The district includes the following localities:

- Avon
- Canton
- part of Stoughton

The current district geographic boundary overlaps with that of the Massachusetts Senate's Norfolk, Bristol and Plymouth district.

=== Former locales ===
The district previously covered:

- Braintree, circa 1927
- Quincy, circa 1872

== Representatives ==
- Franklin Curtis, circa 1858
- William S. Morton, circa 1859
- Willard Franklin Gleason, circa 1888
- Benjamin H. Woodsum, circa 1920
- Francis Appleton Harding, circa 1951
- Harold Putnam, circa 1951
- Robert B. Ambler, circa 1975
- Joseph Semensi
- John H. Flood
- William C. Galvin, 1991-current

== Images ==
Portraits of legislators

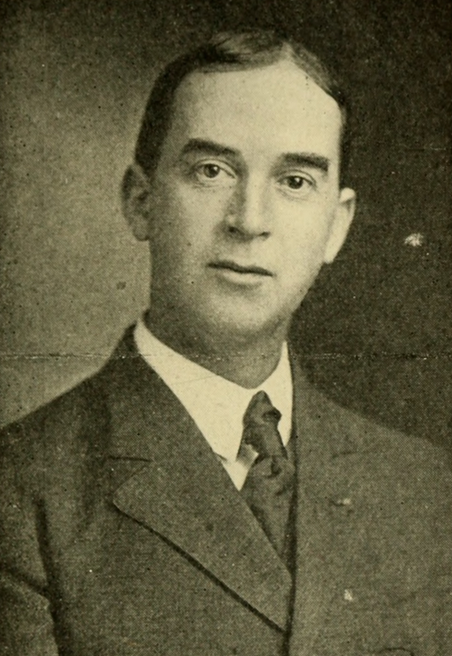
Rednor Coombs

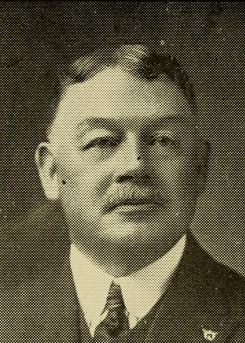
Arthur Paine

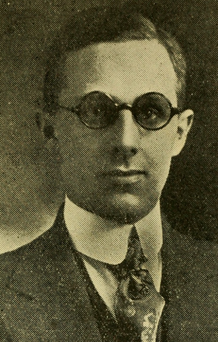
Allen Lawson

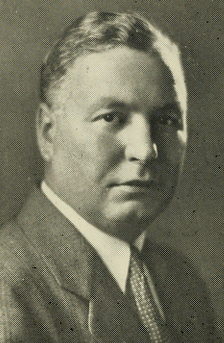
Horace Cahill

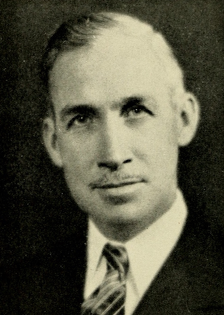
Charles Endicott

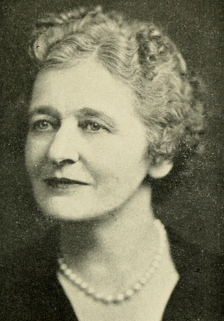
Leslie Bradley Cutler

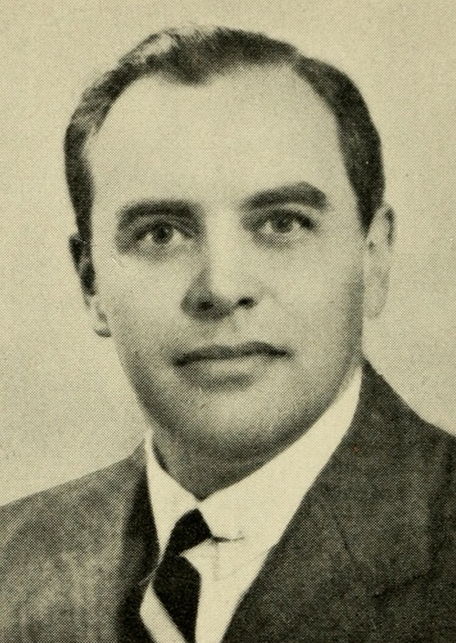
Francis Appleton Harding

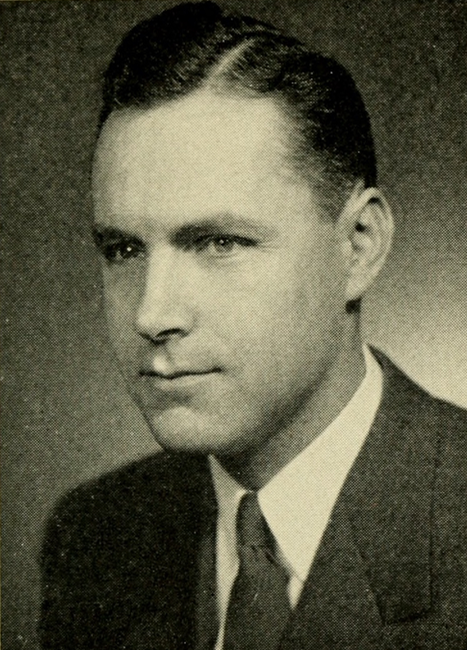
Harold Putnam

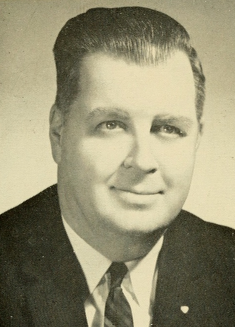
Maurice Ronayne

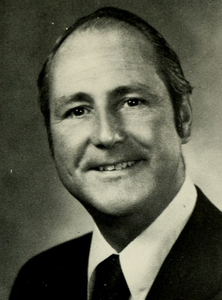
Robert Ambler

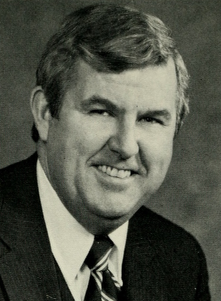
John Flood

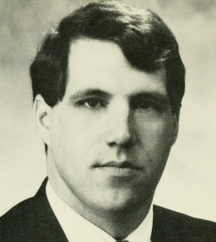
William C. Galvin

== See also ==
- List of Massachusetts House of Representatives elections
- Other Norfolk County districts of the Massachusetts House of Representatives: 1st, 2nd, 3rd, 4th, 5th, 7th, 8th, 9th, 10th, 11th, 12th, 13th, 14th, 15th
- List of Massachusetts General Courts
- List of former districts of the Massachusetts House of Representatives
