= Memorial Hall (Dedham, Massachusetts) =

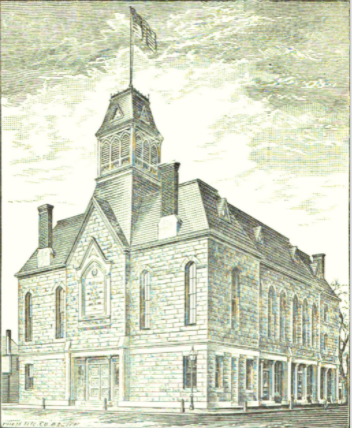
Memorial Hall

Memorial Hall served as both the town hall of Dedham, Massachusetts from 1868 until 1962 and as the Town's monument to the soldiers from the town who died in the Civil War.

== Background ==
After nearly 200 years of Town government, the Town Meeting decided to build a town hall on Bullard Street in 1828. By 1858, however, a town committee was complaining that "the present town house is neither in location, size, or style, sufficient to meet the reasonable requirements of the town." It was too far away from the center village and too ugly they said, and though there were over 1,000 voters in the town the building could not accommodate more than 275. Town meetings were frequently crowded and confused in the townhouse, and it was difficult to hear speakers and determine votes.

Before the Civil War had even ended, residents were considering the best way to honor those who had fought and died in the war. On May 7, 1866, Town Meeting voted to build a new town hall, to be built of Dedham Granite, and on a lot of land bounded by what is today High, Washington, and Church Streets if the land could be acquired from Charles Coolidge. Coolidge had a book and newspaper store on the property and had buildings in the back that were "rented by a class of people... that made the whole locality an eyesore in the heart of the village."

A group of men from the village raised $2,350 to purchase the 16,610 sqft piece of land on June 7, 1866. A budget of $35,000 was set for the project in 1866, and an addition $12,000 was appropriated on March 2, 1868.

The purpose of the building was to both house the various offices of Town government, to include a hall large enough to conduct town meetings in, and to "provide a suitable memorial of the soldiers of Dedham who died in the service of our country during the late war of rebellion. Waldo Colburn, Augustus B. Endicott, William Ames, 2nd, Addison Boyden, and Merrill D. Ellis were chosen at the same meeting to serve as the Building Committee.

== Design ==
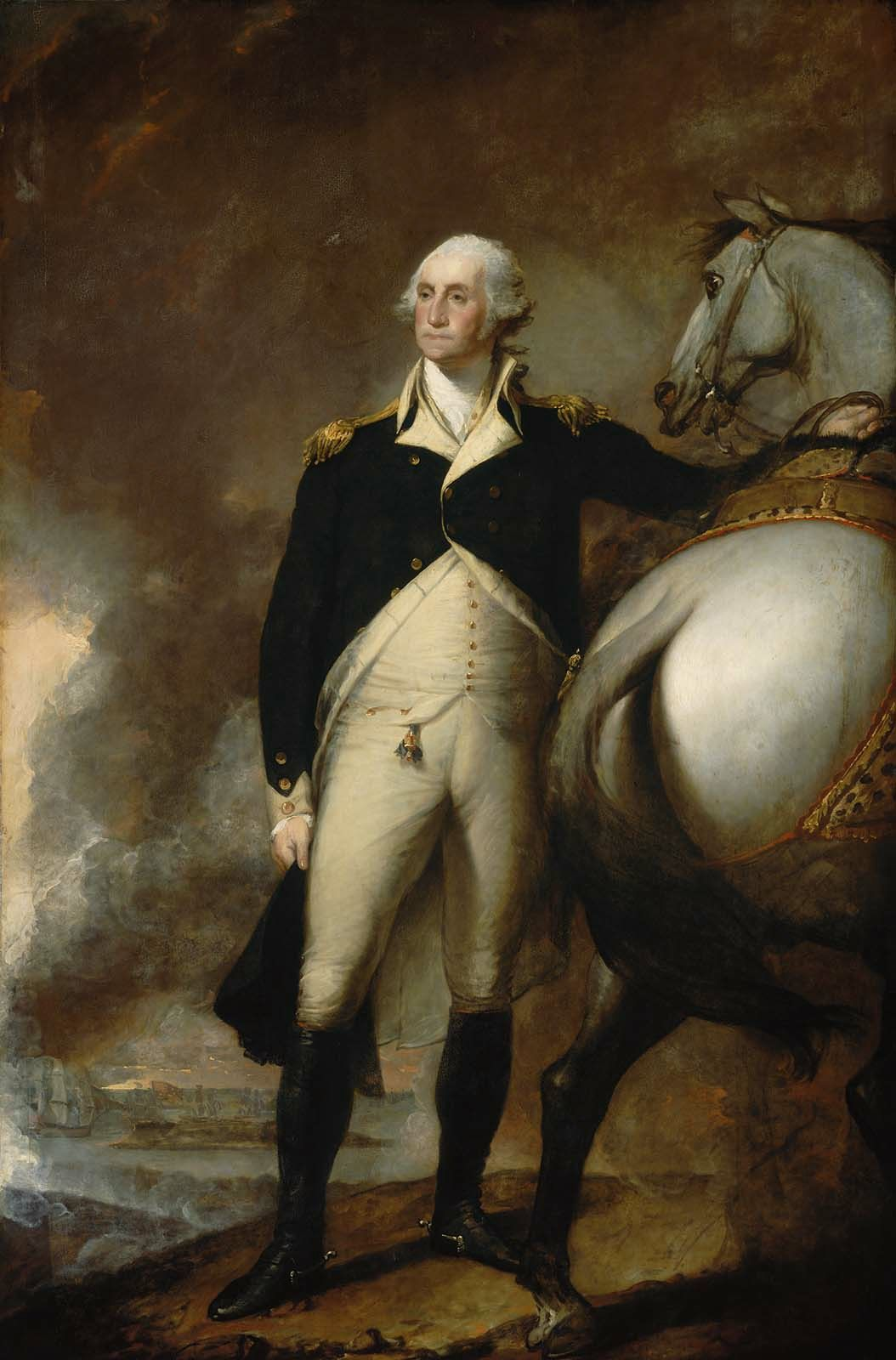
A copy of Gilbert Stuart's painting of George Washington hung in Memorial Hall.

The firm of Ware and Van Brunt was hired to design the building, and they produced a "supremely Victorian plan" that recalled the "provincial town halls of England in outline and design."

Opening from the vestibule was the Selectmen's room on the right and the Post Office on the left. The rest of the first floor was originally occupied by three stores on High Street. The main hall on the second floor was 56 by 90 feet with a balcony at the entrance and an ample stage opposite from which there was ready retirement to four committee rooms, all of which were accessible from Church street by a private entrance and staircase. The hall was capable of accommodating 1,000 people. The interior work throughout was of chestnut and the walls were painted.

Just before the building was dedicated, Lydia Fisher, the widow of Alvan Fisher, donated a copy of a Gilbert Stuart painting depicting George Washington at Dorchester Heights during the Evacuation of Boston on the condition that it be hung at Memorial Hall. (Note: Ezra W. Taft, as chairman of the Board of Selectmen, accepted the gift.) The Town accepted and the painting was later moved to the next town hall on Bryant Street and then to the Ames School.

=== Construction ===
In addition to the Dedham granite, it was relieved by bands of blue Quincy granite. Its main exterior dimensions were 104 by 64 feet on the ground with an elevation of 34 feet to the cornice and 85 feet to the summit of the tower which surmounted the middle division of the front on Washington Street.

Though Town Meeting had appropriated virtually unlimited funds for the project, a town committee tried to save money by cutting out several elements. The changes left it with a slightly unfinished appearance from the outside and an interior "utterly barren of all decent conveniences." As a result, it was described as Dedham's "monument alike to her dead soldiers and to living stupidity."

=== Later additions ===
A fire escape reaching up to the third floor was added in 1912. There was an appropriation for $200 in 1912 to purchase a proscenium curtain, but when the Massachusetts State Police inspected the auditorium they determined that the stage would need alterations. Such changes would result in a 10% decline in capacity and would materially alter the dimensions of the hall. Because of this, no action was immediately taken.

== Tablets ==
Facing Washington Street, in the most conspicuous place over the main entrance, was inserted a large tablet of Quincy granite, decorated with oak leaves and a crown of laurels, and bore the inscription:

To Commemorate The Patriotism and Fidelity
Of Her Sons
Who Fell
In Defence of The Union
In The War Of The Rebellion
Dedham
Erects This Hall
AD
MDCCCLXVII

In the main vestibule, from which stairs to the right and left conducted to the hall above, in a broad niche facing the entrance, were five marble tablets in a Gothic frame work of black walnut. The central tablet, which was enriched by a carved canopy supported by columns bore the following inscription:

The
Town of Dedham
Has Caused
To Be Inscribed Upon
These Tablets
The names of her Sons
Who Fell
Representing Her,
In Defence of the Union
In The War Of
The Rebellion—1861-1865
And In Whose Honor
She Has Erected
This Hall

The tablets on either side contained the names of the 46 soldiers with the rank, date, and place of death in each case. They were arranged in order of regiment:

MICHAEL HENIHAN Co F 2d Regt Killed at Chancellorsville May 3, '63 aged 25.

CHARLES W CARROLL Capt. Co F 18th Regt Wounded at 2d battle of Bull Run Aug 30, '62 died Sept 2, '62 aged 26.

ROBERT R Covey Co F 18th Regt Killed at 2d battle of Bull Run Aug 30, '62 aged 36 .

EDWARD G Cox Co F 18th Regt Wounded at 2d battle of Bull Run Aug 30, '62 died Oct 22, '64 aged 25.

HENRY C EVERETT F 18th Regt Died Jan 19, '65 aged 22.

EDWARD HOLMES Corp Co F 18th Regt Killed at 2d battle of Bull Run Aug 30, '62 aged 26.

JONATHAN H KEYES Co F 18th Regt Killed at Fredericksburgh Dec 13, '62 aged 20.

GEORGE 0 KINGSBURY Co F 18th Regt Killed at 2d battle of Bull Run Aug 30, '62 aged 19.

DANIEL LEAHY Co F 18th Regt Killed at Fredericksburgh Dec 13, '62 aged 28.

LEONARD W Minot Co F 18th Regt Died April 23, '62 aged 20.

HENRY D SMITH Co F 18th Regt Killed at 2d battle of Bull Run Aug 30, '62 aged 30.

NELSON R STEVENS Co F 18th Regt died March 1, '62 aged 19

EDMUND L THOMAS Co F 18th Regt Wounded at 2d battle of Bull Run Aug 30, '62 Died Sept 16, '62 aged 19.

GEORGE N WORTHEN Co F 18th Regt Wounded at 2d battle of Bull Run Aug 30, '62 Died Sept 4, '62 aged 24.

HORACE S DAMRELL Sergt Co H 18th Regt Died March 7, '62 aged 19.

Oscar S GUILD Co H 18th Regt Died Feb 22, '62 aged 17.

JOSEPH M JORDAN Co H 18th Regt Killed at Gaine's Mills June 27, '62 aged 18.

CYRUS D TEWKSBURY Co H 18th Regt Killed at Petersburgh July 5, '64 aged 24.

ALBERT C BEAN Co I 20th Regt Wounded at Cold Harbor June 3, '64 Died June 8, '64 aged 30.

John Finn Jr. Sergt Co B 22d Regt Wounded at North Anna River May 23, '64 Died June 5, '64 aged 23.

WILLIAM HEATH Co 1 22d Regt Accidentally shot at Hall's Hill Dec 7, '62 aged 25.

David FLETCHER Co I 23d Regt Killed at Whitehall NC Dec 16, '63 aged 42.

CHARLES W PHIPPS Co A 24th Regt Killed at Deep Bottom Aug 16, '64 aged 27.

EDWARD SHEEHAN Co B 28th Regt Died Nov 17, '63 aged 43.

John H BIRCH Co I 35th Regt Died Aug 15, '63 aged 32.

GEORGE C BUNKER Co I 35th Regt Killed at Fredericksburgh Dec 13, '62 aged 21.

MICHAEL COLBERT Co I 35th Regt killed at Petersburgh July 30, '64 aged 30.

John G DYMOND Corp Co I 35th Regt died March 29, '63 aged 28.

CHARLES H Ellis Corp Co I 35th Regt died a prisoner of war Feb 27, '64 aged 30.

EDWARD E HATTON Corp Co I 35th Regt killed at Antietam Sept 17, '62 aged 22.

WILLIAM HILL 1st Lieut Co I 35th Regt killed at Fredericksburgh Dec 13, '62 aged 30.

David PHALEN Co I 35th Regt died July 30, '63 aged 48.

CHARLES H SULKOSKI Co I 35th Regt killed at Antietam Sept 17, '62 aged 20.

NATHAN C TREADWELL Co I 35th Regt wounded before Richmond Sept 28, '62 died Oct 26, '62 aged 19.

JOSEPH P White Co I 35th Regt killed at Antietam Sept 17, '62 aged 25.

GEORGE F WHITING Co I 35th Regt wounded at South Mountain Sept 14, '62 died Oct 5, '62 aged 27.

JULIUS M LATHROP Capt Co I 38th Regt wounded at Cane River April 23, '64 died April 26, '64 aged 23.

CHARLES L CARTER Co E 39th Regt died a prisoner of war Feb 8, '65 aged 23.

JAMES J Hawkins Co D 43d Regt died Nov 4, '62

John H BANCROFT Co A 54th Regt killed at Fort Wagner July 18, '63 aged 24.

Anson F BARTON Co G 56th Regt died Oct 7, '64 aged 18.

John W FISKE 1st Lieut Co B 58th Regt killed at Poplar Spring Church Sept 30, '64 aged 23.

WILLIAM H TILLINGHAST Co E 1st Cavalry killed at Deep Bottom Aug 14, '64 aged 40.

JOSEPH T STEVENS Corporal Co I 1st Cavalry died March 31, '262 aged 29.

ALBERT O HAMMOND Co M 2d Cavalry died Sept 12, '64 aged 28.

JOHN E RICHARDSON 4th Cavalry died a prisoner of war in 64 aged 19.

EDWARD HUTCHINS Sergt Andrew Sharpshooters killed at Gettysburgh July 3, '63 aged 36.

The tablets inscribed with the names were transferred to the new Town Hall on Bryant St when it was built in the 1960s, and then again to the Ames Schoolhouse when that became the new town hall in 2020.

== Dedication ==
On August 13, 1868, the Selectmen appointed a Committee of Arrangements for the dedication of Memorial Hall. Ezra W. Taft was chosen chairman and John Cox Jr., Secretary. A committee appointed for that purpose reported the following list which was unanimously adopted Ezra W. Taft, Samuel E. Pond, J. Bradford Baker, Benjamin Weatherbee, and John Cox Jr., constituting the Board of Selectmen, and the following citizens: Eliphalet Stone, William Bullard, Thomas Sherwin Jr., Henry Onion, William J. Wallace, Ephraim Roberts, Charles E. Lewis, Samuel H. Cox, Augustus Bradford Endicott, Ellery C. Daniell, Henry O. Hildreth, Addison Boyden, and Sanford Carroll. Stone declined the appointed owing to ill health and Thomas L. Wakefield was unanimously chosen to fill the vacancy.

At a subsequent meeting of the Committee of Arrangements, Taft was chosen chairman and Samuel H. Cox Secretary. Fisher A. Baker of New York, a native of Dedham and formerly Adjutant of the 18th Massachusetts Infantry Regiment, and who served with that regiment during its term of service, was invited to deliver the address at the dedication of the hall but, owing to business engagements, he declined the invitation. The Committee then unanimously invited Erastus Worthington of Dedham to perform the duty.

Tuesday, September 29, 1868, was fixed upon as the day for the dedication. Taft peremptorily declined the invitation of the committee to act as President of the day and Boyden was chosen to that position instead. The hall was decorated by Lamprell and Marble of Boston. From the center piece in the ceiling, bunting radiated to all parts of the hall. The sides were draped with the stars and stripes and the windows were festooned with various national emblems. The gallery over the main entrance was decorated with flags tastefully looped up and in the center was a shield bearing the inscription "Honor and gratitude to the defenders of our country," while on either side were the shields of Massachusetts and of the United States. The marble tablets in the vestibule were decorated with a border of lilies, salvias, and gladiolas, judiciously interspersed with oak and beech leaves, the tasteful and tender tribute of the ladies to the memory of the dead.

At half past one o'clock, a procession was formed at Temperance Hall and marched through Court and Norfolk Streets, Franklin Square, School Street, Village Avenue, Chestnut and High Streets, to the Hall. The order of procession was:

1. Bates Cornet Band
2. Marshal William Chickering Jr.
3. Assistant Marshal Joseph H. Lathrop
4. Aids Samuel H Cox and Clinton Bagley
5. Fire Department as escort consisting of Company No. 1, Assistant Foreman George F. Richards, Company No. 4, Henry W. Weeks, Foreman
6. Union Cornet Band of South Dedham
7. Aids Amasa Guild, J Bradford Calder, and Charles H. Rogers
8. Battalion of returned Soldiers and Sailors
9. Disabled Soldiers and Sailors in carriages
10. Aide Eben N. Hewins
11. Committee of Arrangements
12. Building Committee
13. Town Officers
14. Invited Guests
15. Aides J.W. Chase and C.A. Taft
16. Citizens

At 2:15, the procession entered the hall and were assigned seats at 2:30. The hall was densely crowded and the invited guests were escorted to the platform. Among them were Theron Metcalf, formerly a Justice of the Supreme Judicial Court and once a resident of Dedham, Chief Justice Seth Ames of the Superior Court, a native of the town, Judge JP Putnam, General A.B. Underwood of Newton, the clergymen of the town, the authorities of neighboring towns, and others.

Once everyone was seated, Gilmore's Band played before opening remarks by Boyden. Rev. George Hill of the Universalist Church in South Dedham then offered an opening prayer. Colburn provided a report of the Building Committee and then handed the keys to Taft in his role as chairmen of the selectmen. Taft then offered a few remarks before a hymn, specially written for the occasion by Mrs. William J. Adams, was sung. Rev. Jonathan Edwards of the Allin Congregational Church then offered the dedicatory prayer and Erastus Worthington gave a speech.

A poem, written and delivered by Horace E. Currier, was then delivered before another hymn, composed by William Everett of Boston, was sung by the audience. Rev. I.J. Burgess of the Baptist Church in West Dedham closed the event with a prayer.

At a meeting of the Committee of Arrangements held after the dedication of the hall, a vote of thanks to Worthington for his patriotic and eloquent address was unanimously adopted and the chairman was instructed to ask a copy for publication. Bullard, Hildreth and John Cox were appointed a committee to prepare a report of the exercises for the press and to superintend its publication, after which the committee was dissolved.

== Uses ==
The police department was originally housed on the first floor of Memorial Hall.

== Auditorium ==
For many years, the auditorium was the only large hall in town. It was used for a number of events, including minstrel shows, concerts, lectures, plays, and movies. One such play, Old Days and Doings in Dedham, was organized by the Dedham Women's Club. It told stories from throughout the Town's history with scenery painted by Charles Mills.

A patriotic mass meeting, organized by Henry B. Endicott, was held in the hall to prepare for World War I. Dedham's American Legion Post organized in the hall on June 5, 1919.

On January 11, 1895, the citizens of the town gathered in Memorial Hall to celebrate the 250th anniversary of the founding of the first free, tax supported public school in the nation. A "felicitous" speech was made by Governor Frederic T. Greenhalge and an "historical address" was made by Rev. Carlos Slafter. Lieutenant Governor Roger Wolcott, Judge Ely and the Honorable F. A. Hill also spoke.

== Retail shops ==
The building also housed several retail shops on the first floor.

In 1870, a horse owned by John Gardiner broke free from the carriage to which it was hitched and took off down River Place. Crowds tried to stop it when it reached Memorial Hall, but the horse turned instead and ran into Andrew Norris' grocery store on the first floor. The front assembly of the carriage, which was trailing behind, hit a granite hitching post, and turned the assembly vertically so that one wheel was on the air and the other was scraping along the ground. The horse bolted through the store, past a rack of glassware and crockery, and then out the other door without causing any damage.

== Demolition ==
By the mid-20th century, Town employees had long been asking for a more suitable building after years of being forced to wear coats inside during the winter and dodging leaks in the ceiling. In 1955, the ornate tower on the front of the building was deemed to be unsafe and was taken down.

Town Clerk John Carey locked the doors for the last time on March 16, 1962. The building was demolished in April 1962 after a new town hall was built on Bryant St. A new police station was built on the site.

== Works cited ==
- Hanson, Robert Brand (1976). Dedham, Massachusetts, 1635-1890. Dedham Historical Society.
- Dedham Historical Society (2001). Images of America: Dedham. Arcadia Publishing. ISBN 978-0-7385-0944-0.
- Worthington, Erastus (1869). Dedication of the Memorial Hall, in Dedham, September 29, 1868: With an Appendix. John Cox, Jr.
- Smith, Frank (1936). A History of Dedham, Massachusetts. Transcript Press, Incorporated.
- Parr, James L. (2009). Dedham: Historic and Heroic Tales From Shiretown. The History Press. pp. 112–113. ISBN 978-1-59629-750-0.
- Town of Dedham (1913). Annual Report 1913.
- Clarke, Wm. Horatio (1903). Mid-Century Memories of Dedham. Dedham Historical Society.
