= John H. Flood =

American politician (1939–2016)

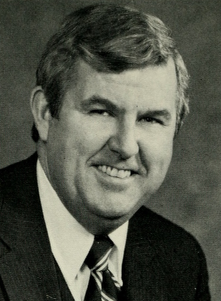
- Flood c. 1983

Norfolk County Sheriff
- In office 1996–1999
- Appointed by: Bill Weld
- Preceded by: Clifford Marshall
- Succeeded by: Michael G. Bellotti

Member of the Massachusetts House of Representatives from the 6th Norfolk District
- In office 1981–1991
- Preceded by: Joseph Semensi
- Succeeded by: William C. Galvin

Personal details
- Born: June 24, 1939 Norwood, Massachusetts
- Died: July 26, 2016 (aged 77) Norton, Massachusetts
- Party: Republican (1995–2016); Democrat (1981–1995)
- Education: Suffolk University; Northeastern University; Suffolk University Law School
- Occupation: Attorney; Politician

John H. "Jack" Flood (June 24, 1939 – July 26, 2016) was an American politician who was Sheriff of Norfolk County, Massachusetts from 1996 to 1999 and a member of the Massachusetts House of Representatives from 1981 to 1991.

In 1990, Flood was a candidate for Governor of Massachusetts. His campaign came to an end at the Democratic Convention when he failed to get the 15% necessary to appear on the primary ballot. During the general election, Flood frequently criticized Democratic nominee John Silber, who went on to lose to Republican William Weld. Weld later named Flood to his transition team.

Flood was nominated for a judgeship twice in 1993, but he was rejected both times by the Massachusetts Governor's Council.

In 1996, Flood was appointed by Weld to the vacant sheriff's position in Norfolk County. He ran as a Republican for a full term in 1998, but lost to Democrat Michael G. Bellotti. Prior to being appointed sheriff, Flood was a panelist on the WCVB-TV Sunday morning talk show Five on Five. He died on July 26, 2016.
