= Rufus Corbin Wood =

Norfolk County, Massachusetts sheriff
- In office 1878–1885
- Preceded by: John W. Thomas
- Succeeded by: Augustus B. Endicott

Personal details
- Born: May 30, 1818 Palmer, Massachusetts
- Died: July 29, 1885
- Resting place: Canton Corner Cemetery, Canton, Massachusetts

Rufus Corbin Wood (May 30, 1818 – July 29, 1885) was sheriff of Norfolk County, Massachusetts from 1878 to 1885.

== Early life ==
Wood was born in Palmer, Massachusetts on May 30, 1818.

== Death and burial ==
Wood died on July 29, 1885. He was buried at the Canton Corner Cemetery in Canton, Massachusetts.
