= Michael G. Bellotti =

American politician (born 1963)

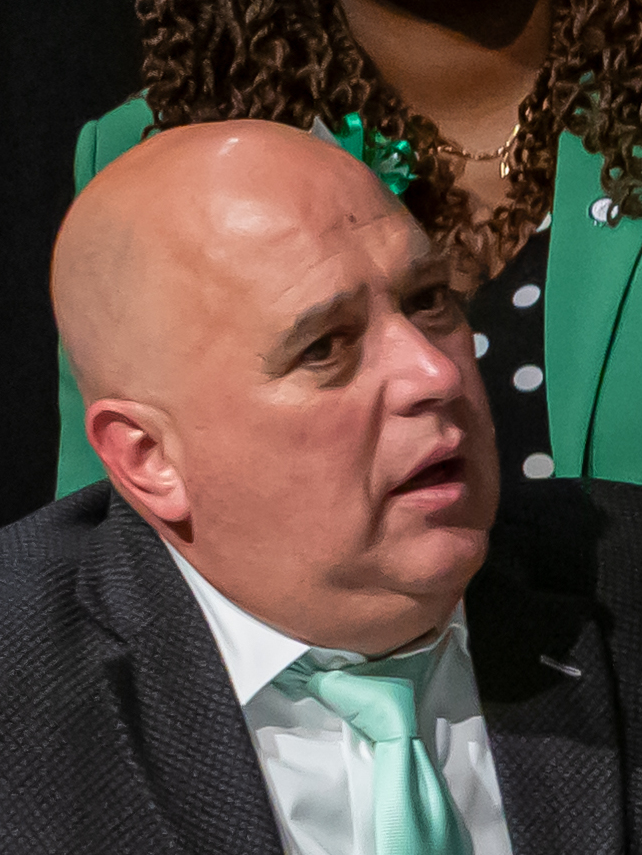
- Bellotti in 2024

Norfolk County Treasurer
- Incumbent
- Assumed office January 6, 2021
- Preceded by: James E. Timilty

Norfolk County Sheriff
- In office 1999–2018
- Preceded by: John H. Flood
- Succeeded by: Jerry McDermott

Member of the Massachusetts House of Representatives from the 1st Norfolk district
- In office 1993–1999
- Preceded by: Michael W. Morrissey
- Succeeded by: Bruce Ayers

Personal details
- Born: March 21, 1963 (age 63) Boston, Massachusetts, U.S.
- Party: Democratic
- Parent: Francis Bellotti (father)
- Education: Boston College
- Occupation: Produce Wholesaler; Politician

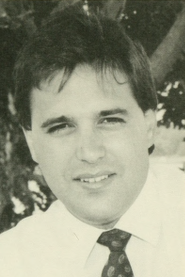
Bellotti c. 1995

Michael G. Bellotti (born March 21, 1963) is an American politician who is the current Norfolk County Treasurer. He is the former interim president of Quincy College, the former sheriff of Norfolk County, Massachusetts, and is a former member of the Massachusetts House of Representatives from Quincy. He is the son of Francis Bellotti, the state's former lieutenant governor and attorney general.

Bellotti is a graduate of Boston College (A.B.) and New England School of Law (J.D.)
