= Jerry McDermott =

High Sheriff of Norfolk County, Massachusetts

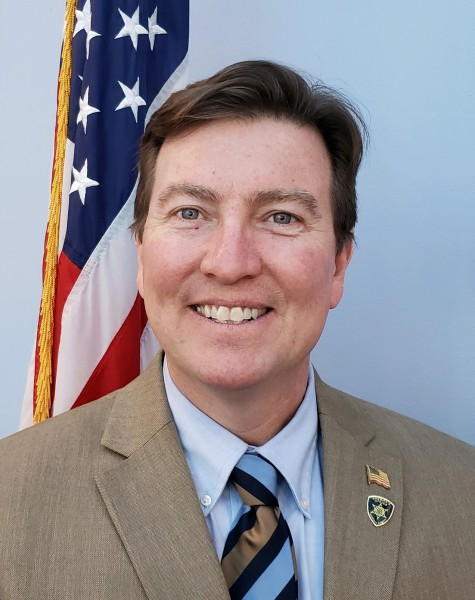
- Official portrait, 2018

Sheriff of Norfolk County, Massachusetts
- In office December 24, 2018 – January 6, 2021
- Appointed by: Charlie Baker
- Preceded by: Michael G. Bellotti
- Succeeded by: Patrick W. McDermott

Member of the Boston City Council from the 9th District
- In office 2002–2008
- Preceded by: Brian Honan
- Succeeded by: Mark Ciommo

Personal details
- Born: Boston, Massachusetts
- Party: Republican (2013-present); Democratic (until 2010)
- Education: University of Massachusetts Boston
- Profession: Politician

Jerome P. “Jerry” McDermott is an American politician who served as the 22nd High Sheriff of Norfolk County from 2018 through 2021, as well as a member of the Boston City Council from 2002 through 2008.

He was appointed sheriff by Governor Baker in December 2018 after the resignation of Michael G. Bellotti, but failed in his 2020 attempt to win election to a full term.

== Early life ==
McDermott grew up in the Allston-Brighton region of Boston, where he was involved in groups such as the Ward 22 Democratic Committee and the Oak Square YMCA.

== Political career ==
=== Early career ===
McDermott's career began as a legislative aide to Congressman Joseph P. Kennedy II, and subsequently Boston City Council President Bruce Bolling.

=== Boston City Council ===
McDermott served on the Boston City Council. He also served as the executive director of South Shore Habitat for Humanity.

In 2006, as a councilor, McDermott proposed that the Boston Citgo sign be removed in response to Venezuelan President Hugo Chávez's insults toward U.S. President George W. Bush. McDermott also suggested draping an American flag or Boston Red Sox banner over the sign until Chávez was out of office. McDermott was the Chairman of the Post Audit & Oversight Committee when he called for transparency and hearings on a controversial land deal between the Boston Redevelopment Authority (BRA) and the Islamic Society of Boston (ISB). Councilor McDermott is probably best remembered for his advocacy for school children in the wake of the Archdiocese of Boston's Clergy Sexual Abuse scandal and the aftermath that caused schools to be closed.

=== Subsequent politics ===
While serving on the city council, McDermott had been a registered as a Democrat, but unenrolled from the party in 2010. He registered as a Republican in 2013.

McDermott served as State Director for Senator Scott Brown and worked in community relations and economic development for Eversource. In March 2018 he was appointed as chief of staff in the Massachusetts Division of Capital Asset Management and Maintenance in the administration of Governor Charlie Baker.

=== Sheriff of Norfolk County ===
McDermott was appointed sheriff of Norfolk County, Massachusetts by Governor Baker in December 2018 after the resignation of Michael G. Bellotti. He ran for a full term in a November 2020 special election, and was defeated by Patrick McDermott (no relation) by 60%-40%. Massachusetts Majority PAC, a Super PAC with close ties to Massachusetts Governor Charlie Baker, had spent $167,148 on his behalf. This made him the biggest beneficiary of the super PAC's spending.

== Personal life ==
McDermott lives in Westwood, Massachusetts.

== Electoral history ==
2022 Republican primary election for Sheriff of Norfolk County
Party	Candidate	Votes	%
Republican	Jerry P. McDermott	24,412	98.0
Write-in		490	2.0
Total votes		24,902	100.0

2022 General election for Sheriff of Norfolk County
Party	Candidate	Votes	%
Democratic	Patrick W. McDermott	225,092	60.4
Republican	Jerry P. McDermott	146,714	39.4
Write-in		580	0.2
Total votes		372,386	100.0
