= William C. Galvin =

American insurance broker and politician (born 1956)

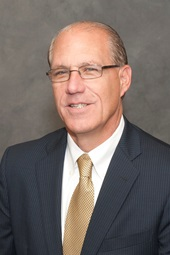

Member of the Massachusetts House of Representatives from the 6th Norfolk District
- Incumbent
- Assumed office 1991
- Preceded by: John H. Flood

Personal details
- Born: October 18, 1956 (age 69) Dorchester, Boston, Massachusetts
- Party: Democratic
- Education: Framingham State College; Suffolk University
- Occupation: Insurance Broker; Politician

William C. Galvin (born October 18, 1956) is an American insurance broker and politician who represents the 6th Norfolk District in the Massachusetts House of Representatives. A member of the Democratic Party, he was first elected to the legislature in 1990.

== Political career ==
Galvin entered politics when he was elected to the Canton Board of Library Trustees, where he served from 1979 to 1987. He was then elected to the town's Board of Assessors, a position which he has held since 1987.

In 1990, with incumbent Representative John H. Flood retiring to run for governor, Galvin sought the Democratic nomination for the 6th Norfolk District. He won the primary with 57.4% of the vote and the general election with 44.4% against Canton Republican Avril T. Elkort.

== Committee Assignments ==
For the 2025-26 Session, Galvin sits on the following committees in the House:

- Chairperson, House Committee on Rules
- Chairperson, Joint Committee on Rules

For the 2015–16, 2017–18, 2019–20, 2021–22, and 2023-24 Session, Galvin sat on the following committees in the House:

- Chairperson, House Committee on Rules
- Chairperson, Joint Committee on Rules

For the 2011–12 and 2013-14 Session, Galvin sat on the following committees in the House:

- Chairperson, House Committee on Personnel and Administration

For the 2007-08 Session, Galvin sat on the following committees in the House:

- Vice Chair, Joint Committee on Elder Affairs
- Vice Chair, The Joint Committee on Children, Families and Persons with Disabilities
- House Ways and Means
- Joint Committee on Election Laws
- Joint Committee on Ways and Means
- The Joint Committee on Financial Services

For the 2005-06 Session, Galvin sat on the following committees in the House:

- Joint Committee on Bonding, Capital Expenditures and State Assets
- Joint Committee on Transportation
- The Joint Committee on Financial Services

For the 2001–02 and 2003-04 Session, Galvin sat on the following committees in the House:

- Vice Chair, Joint Committee on Insurance
- House Medicaid
- House Ways and Means
- Joint Committee on Health Care
- Joint committee on Ways and Means

For the 1997–98 and 1999-00 Session, Galvin sat on the following committees in the House:

- House Steering, Policy and Scheduling
- House Ways and Means
- Joint committee on Ways and Means

For the 1995-96 Session, Galvin sat on the following committees in the House:

- House Ethics
- House Ways and Means
- Joint Committee on Housing and Urban Development
- Joint committee on Ways and Means

For the 1993-94 Session, Galvin sat on the following committees in the House:

- House Ethics
- Joint Committee on Energy
- The Joint Committee on Banks and Banking

*Public records do not list his specific committee assignments from the 1991-92 session.

== See also ==
- 2019–2020 Massachusetts legislature
- 2021–2022 Massachusetts legislature
