= Clifford Marshall =

American politician

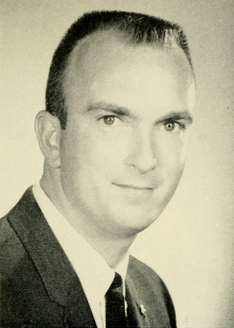

Norfolk County, Massachusetts Sheriff
- In office 1975–1996
- Preceded by: Charles Hedges
- Succeeded by: John H. Flood

Member of the Massachusetts House of Representatives from the 2nd Norfolk District
- In office 1969–1975
- Preceded by: Arthur Tobin
- Succeeded by: Thomas F. Brownell

Personal details
- Born: December 14, 1937 Quincy, Massachusetts
- Died: August 29, 1996 (aged 58) Quincy, Massachusetts
- Party: Democratic
- Education: Suffolk University
- Occupation: Politician

Clifford Holmes Marshall was an American politician who served as a State Representative and Sheriff of Norfolk County, Massachusetts.

== Early life ==
Marshall was born December 14, 1937, in Quincy, Massachusetts. He attended Quincy public schools and Suffolk University.

== Early career ==
From 1965 to 1969, Marshall was a member of the Quincy City Council. He then represented the 2nd Norfolk District in the Massachusetts House of Representatives from 1969 to 1975.

== Sheriff ==
Marshall served as Sheriff of Norfolk County, Massachusetts, from 1975 until his death in 1996. During his tenure as sheriff, Marshall was known as an innovator. He started community service and work release programs and in 1985 he opened the Braintree Alternative Center for nonviolent criminals who were part of these programs. He also started an electronic house arrest program to alleviate jail overcrowding and Norfolk County's first sexual assault unit. He also oversaw construction of the new Norfolk County sheriff's office and correctional center in Dedham, which replaced the Dedham County Jail built 175 years earlier.

In 1991, Marshall was fined $10,900 by the Massachusetts Ethics Commission for charging personal expenses to an American Express card issued by the Norfolk County deputy sheriff's office and appointing two of his sons as deputy sheriffs. In 1995, the commission found that he had illegally used his power to appoint deputy sheriffs to raise funds. The committee chose not to issue a fine in this case.

Marshall died on August 28, 1996, at his home in Quincy of complications from cancer.
