= John W. Thomas (sheriff) =

American politician

John Warren Thomas

Norfolk County, Massachusetts Sheriff
- In office January 1, 1857 – January 1, 1878
- Preceded by: Thomas Adams
- Succeeded by: Rufus Corbin Wood

Norfolk County, Massachusetts Sheriff
- In office 1852–1853
- Appointed by: George S. Boutwell
- Preceded by: Thomas Adams
- Succeeded by: Thomas Adams

Personal details
- Born: April 1, 1815 Weymouth, Massachusetts
- Died: July 20, 1888
- Party: Democratic; Free Soil; Republican
- Spouse: Sarah Blanchard
- Children: John Warren Thomas, Jr., born November 14, 1849
- Occupation: Shoemaker

John Warren Thomas (April 1, 1815 - July 20, 1888) was a shoemaker, and politician who twice served as the Sheriff of Norfolk County, Massachusetts, first for one year, from 1852 to 1853, and again for 21 years, from 1857 to 1878.

== Personal life ==
Thomas, the son of Andrew Thomas, was born in Weymouth, Massachusetts, on April 1, 1815. Thomas received his education in the Weymouth public schools. He was a Congregationalist.

Thomas died on July 20, 1888, at the age of 73. His portrait is in the collection of the Dedham Historical Society.

== Political career ==
In 1852 Thomas was elected to represent Weymouth in the Massachusetts House of Representatives, and in 1853 he was elected to serve as a member of the Massachusetts Constitutional Convention.

In 1852 Thomas was appointed Norfolk County sheriff by Massachusetts governor George S. Boutwell. The next year Thomas was removed from office for political reasons by Boutwell's successor John H. Clifford In 1856 the state law was changed and the office of sheriff became an elected, rather than appointed position, Thomas received the nominations of both the American and Republican parties. Thomas was elected by a plurality of three thousand, and a majority of twenty five hundred votes over the Democratic and (Fillmore) American party candidate Edward Potter. Thomas was once again sworn as the Norfolk County sheriff on January 1, 1857. Thomas continued in office until January 1, 1878, winning each triennial election until he declined to run again due to failing health.
