= Jerauld Newland Ezra Mann =

American sheriff (1796–1857)

Norfolk County, Massachusetts Sheriff
- In office February 8, 1843 – 1848
- Preceded by: John Baker II
- Succeeded by: Thomas Adams

Personal details
- Born: June 26, 1796 Medfield, Massachusetts
- Died: April 15, 1857 (aged 60) Vernon, Connecticut
- Occupation: Carriage painter

Jerauld Newland Ezra Mann (June 26, 1796 - April 15, 1857) was sheriff of Norfolk County, Massachusetts from 1843 to 1848.

Mann was born in Medfield, Massachusetts on June 26, 1796. Mann learned the trade of a carriage painter from Messrs Bird of Walpole. In 1823 he went to Easton where he remained but a short time, removing the year following to Taunton where he remained five years. He then went to Wrentham and thence to Dedham where he took the place of his brother-in-law, Major TP Whitney, as Deputy Sheriff and Jailer.

On the death of Sheriff John Baker II, Mann was appointed Sheriff on February 8, 1843, for a term of five years. At the end of his term he declined a reappointment, but continued to act as Deputy Sheriff and Jailer until July 1855 when failing health compelled his resignation. Mann soon after removed to Vernon, Connecticut the residence of his youngest daughter. He died there on April 15, 1857.

Mann's portrait is in the collection of the Dedham Historical Society.
