= Thomas Adams (sheriff) =

Sheriff of Norfolk County, Massachusetts

Norfolk County, Massachusetts Sheriff
- In office 1853 – January 1, 1857
- Appointed by: John H. Clifford
- Preceded by: John W. Thomas
- Succeeded by: John W. Thomas

Norfolk County, Massachusetts Sheriff
- In office 1848–1852
- Preceded by: Jerauld N. E. Mann
- Succeeded by: John W. Thomas

Personal details
- Born: 20 April 1804. Quincy, Massachusetts
- Died: January 2, 1869 (aged 64)
- Party: Whig
- Spouse: Mehetabel Field

Thomas Adams (April 20, 1804 – January 2, 1869) was sheriff of Norfolk County, Massachusetts, from 1848 to 1852, and from 1853 to January 1, 1857.

== Biography ==
Adams was born in Quincy, Massachusetts, on April 20, 1804. Early in life, Adams worked as a butcher alongside his father; later, he owned several different stage lines and traded in horses. Adams married Mehetabel Field, the daughter of Joseph and Relief (Baxter) Field on April 4, 1826.

Adams died of apoplexy on January 2, 1869.
