= Elijah Crane =

American politician

Norfolk County, Massachusetts Sheriff
- In office June 20, 1812 – 1834
- Preceded by: William Brewer
- Succeeded by: John Baker, II
- In office May 16, 1810 – 1811
- Preceded by: Benjamin Clark Cutler
- Succeeded by: William Brewer

Town Clerk of Canton, Massachusetts
- In office May 16, 1810 – 1811
- Preceded by: None, new office

Member of the Board of Selectmen for Canton, Massachusetts
- Preceded by: None, new office

Member of the Massachusetts House of Representatives
- Preceded by: None, new office

Personal details
- Born: August 29, 1754 Milton, Massachusetts August 29, 1754
- Died: February 21, 1834 Canton, Massachusetts

Elijah Crane (August 29, 1754-February 21, 1834) was a Canton, Massachusetts farmer, and inn keeper, who served as the first Town Clerk, and on the first Board of Selectmen of Canton, Massachusetts. Crane was also the first representative to the Massachusetts House of Representatives from Canton, and the sheriff of Norfolk County, Massachusetts from May 16, 1810 to 1811 and from June 20, 1812 to 1834.

Crane also served as the 24th Grand Master of Masons in Massachusetts during 1833 and until his death in 1834.

He was involved with the creation of the Dedham Bank.

== Revolutionary War service ==
Crane served with his militia company during the Siege of Boston, at the fortification known as the Lamb's Den in the American Revolutionary War.
