= John Baker II =

Norfolk County, Massachusetts sheriff
- In office 1834 – July 1, 1843
- Preceded by: Elijah Crane
- Succeeded by: Jerauld N. E. Mann

Personal details
- Born: February 27, 1780 Dorchester, Massachusetts
- Died: July 1, 1843
- Occupation: Wheelwright, coroner, deputy sheriff, sheriff

John Baker II (February 27, 1780 – July 1, 1843) was sheriff of Norfolk County, Massachusetts from 1834 to 1843.

Baker died on July 1, 1843.
