= William Brewer (sheriff) =

American politician

Member of the Massachusetts House of Representatives
- In office 1814–1817

Norfolk County, Massachusetts Sheriff
- In office 1817–1812
- Preceded by: Elijah Crane
- Succeeded by: Elijah Crane

Member of the Massachusetts House of Representatives
- In office 1801–1811

Member of the Board of Selectmen of the Town of Roxbury, Massachusetts

Personal details
- Died: August 2, 1817

William Brewer was an American politician who served on the Board of Selectmen of the Town of Roxbury, Massachusetts, as a member of the Massachusetts House of Representatives and from, 1811 to 1812, as the sheriff of Norfolk County, Massachusetts.

== Death ==
Brewer died on August 2, 1817.
