= Charles Hedges (American politician) =

American politician (1901–1978)

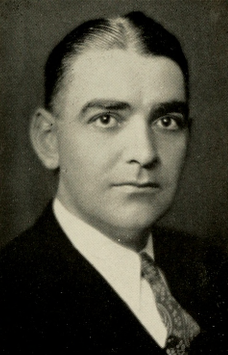

Norfolk County, Massachusetts Sheriff
- In office 1960–1975
- Preceded by: Peter M. McCormack
- Succeeded by: Clifford Marshall

Member of the Massachusetts Senate for the 1st Norfolk District
- In office 1951–1960
- Preceded by: John D. Mackay
- Succeeded by: Thomas S. Burgin

Personal details
- Born: March 27, 1901 Westfield, Massachusetts
- Died: December 18, 1978 (aged 77) Quincy, Massachusetts
- Party: Republican
- Education: Syracuse University

Charles W. Hedges (March 27, 1901 – December 18, 1978) was an American politician who was a member of the Quincy, Massachusetts, city council, Massachusetts House of Representatives, Massachusetts Senate and sheriff of Norfolk County, Massachusetts, from 1961 to 1975.

== Early life ==
Hedges was born on March 27, 1901, in Westfield, Massachusetts. He moved to Quincy at the age of eight. He graduated from Quincy High School in 1919 and went on to attend Dean Academy. He graduated from Syracuse University, where he was a member of the Syracuse Orange football team. After graduating, Hedges played semi-professional football and was an assistant football coach at Quincy High. In 1927, he founded the Standard Service Bureau, a credit reporting firm.

== Political career ==
Hedges' political career began in 1929 when he was elected to the Quincy city council. He then represented the 4th Norfolk district in the Massachusetts House of Representatives from 1933 until he resigned in 1942 to join the United States Army Air Corps. During World War II, Hedges served for two years and ten months on the air staff of Douglas MacArthur. In 1945, Hedges was wounded on Guadalcanal. After the war, he served in the Massachusetts Air National Guard and retired with the rank of brigadier general. In 1947, he returned to the House of Representatives. In 1950, he was elected to the Massachusetts Senate in the 1st Norfolk District. From 1957 to 1959, he was the Republican floor leader. In 1960, Hedges ran for Sheriff of Norfolk County. He defeated the Democrat Peter M. McCormack, who had been appointed to the position following the death of Republican Samuel H. Wragg, by 128,319 votes to 117,843. During his tenure, Hedges instituted work and education release programs for prison inmates and pushed for the construction of a new county jail. He retired in 1974.

== Death ==
Hedges died on December 18, 1978, in Quincy City Hospital. He was survived by his wife, Dr. Ella J. Goodale.
