= Augustus Bradford Endicott =

American politician

Member of the Massachusetts House of Representatives
- In office 1872–1874

Sheriff of Norfolk County, Massachusetts
- In office 1885–1898
- Preceded by: Rufus Corbin Wood
- Succeeded by: Samuel Capen

Member of the Dedham, Massachusetts Board of Selectmen

Overseer of the Poor Dedham, Massachusetts

Personal details
- Born: September 10, 1818 Canton, Massachusetts
- Died: November 21, 1910 (aged 92) Dedham, Massachusetts
- Spouse: Sarah Fairbanks (m. 1845)

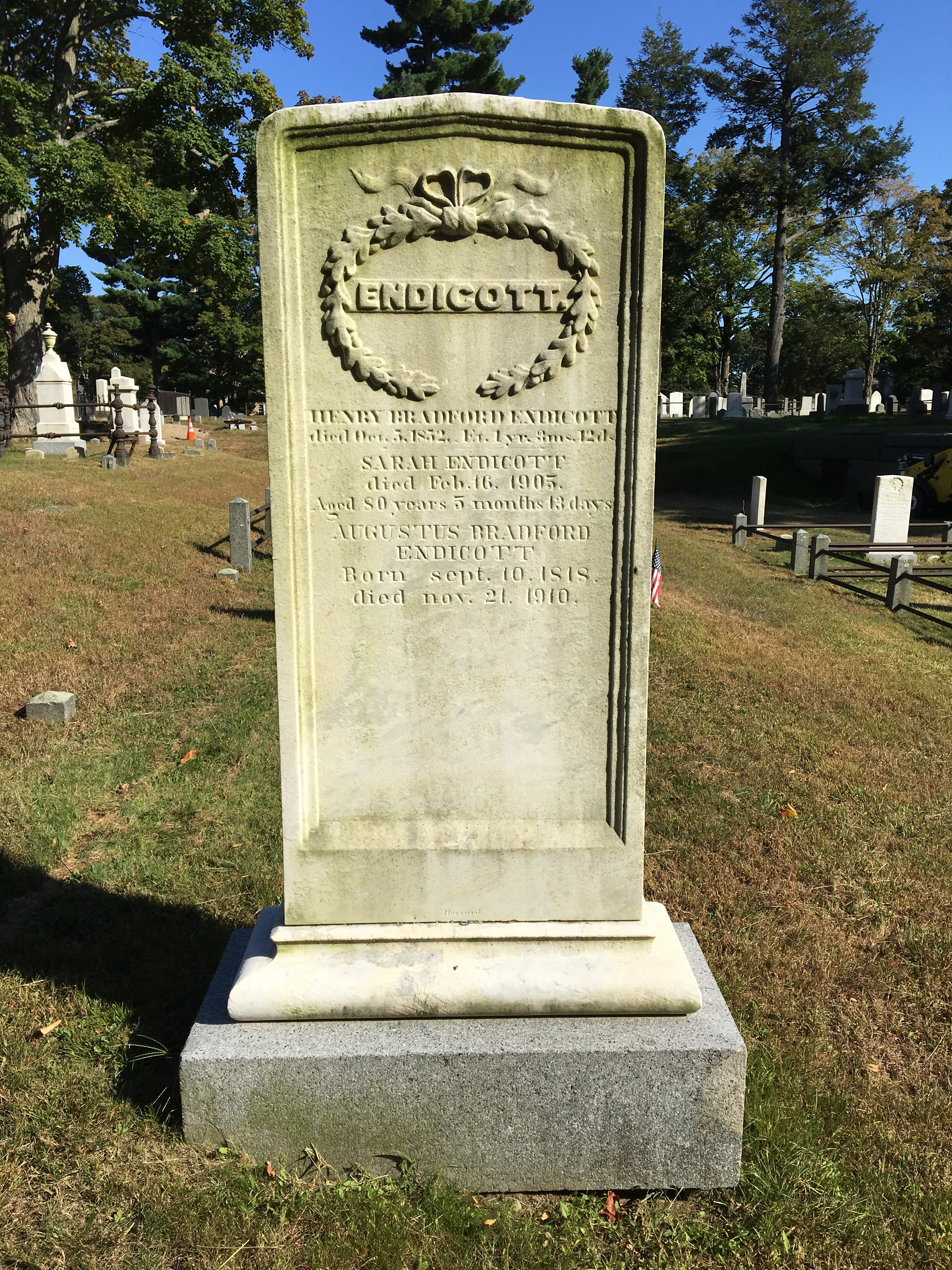
Endicott's grave at the Old Village Cemetery

Augustus Bradford Endicott (September 10, 1818 – November 21, 1910) was a Massachusetts state legislator and sheriff of Norfolk County.

== Biography ==
Endicott, the son of Elijah Endicott and Cynthia (Childs) Endicott, was born September 10, 1818, in Canton, Massachusetts. He was a direct descendant of Gilbert Endicott, who arrived in Massachusetts from England in 1658. Following an apprenticeship as a carpenter, Endicott moved to Chelsea, Massachusetts at age 21 where he was employed for ten years as a pattern maker in a foundry.

In 1853, Endicott moved to Dedham, Massachusetts, and was appointed deputy sheriff of Norfolk County for Dedham the same year. He served in that position until 1885. In 1885, he was elected sheriff of Norfolk County, a position in which he served for ten years. Endicott represented Dedham in the Massachusetts House of Representatives in 1872 and 1874.

Endicott was active in Dedham civic affairs, and served as a member of the town's Board of Selectmen for twenty years. Endicott also served as an assessor, auditor, overseer of the poor, and was on the Board of Health for twenty-one years. He was the first chief of the Dedham Fire Department.

Endicott served as president of both the Dedham National Bank and the Dedham Institution for Savings, until there was a law passed by the Massachusetts state legislature that a person could not hold office in a savings bank and a national bank at the same time. Endicott also served as director of the Dedham Mutual Fire Insurance Company. In 1907 he was elected to as the clerk and treasurer of The Society in Dedham for Apprehending Horse Thieves. He was also on the committee that built Memorial Hall, Dedham's Town Hall and monument to the soldiers who died in the Civil War.

Endicott married Sarah Fairbanks on July 22, 1845. She was the daughter of William and Millie Fairbanks and a direct descendant of Jonathan Fairbanks of Dedham. Endicott and his wife had three children who lived to adulthood: Mary Augusta, Elizabeth Blanche, and Henry Bradford, the founder of the Endicott Shoe Company who built the Endicott Estate. Elizabeth was the mother of Phillip E. Young, who founded the Acushnet Company.

Augustus Bradford Endicott died November 21, 1910, in Dedham and is buried in the Old Village Cemetery.

== See also ==
- 1872 Massachusetts legislature
- 1874 Massachusetts legislature

== Works cited ==
- Smith, Frank (1936). A History of Dedham, Massachusetts. Transcript Press, Incorporated.
