= Samuel Capen =

Samuel Howard Capen
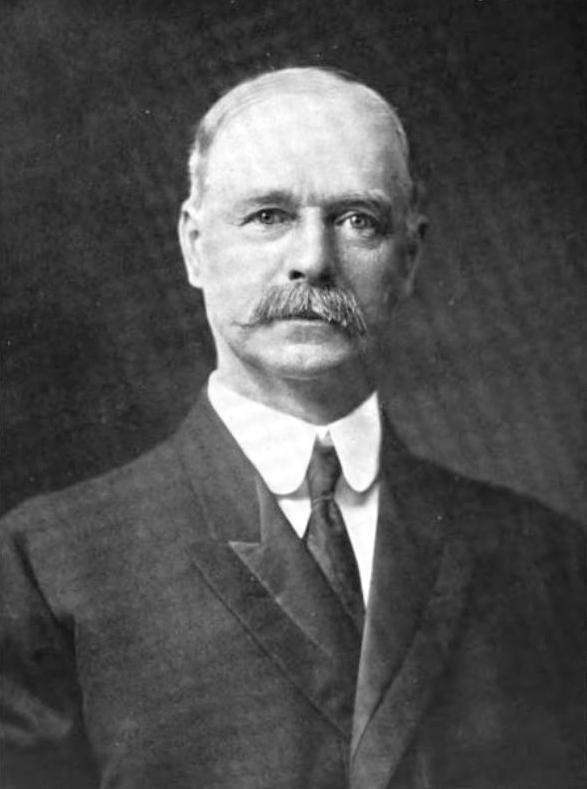

Norfolk County, Massachusetts Sheriff
- In office 1898–1939
- Preceded by: Augustus B. Endicott
- Succeeded by: Samuel Wragg

Personal details
- Born: March 12, 1848 Canton, Massachusetts
- Died: May 24, 1943 (aged 95) Dedham, Massachusetts
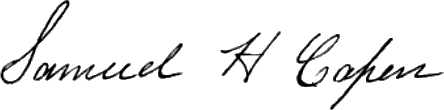
- Signature

Samuel Howard Capen (March 12, 1848 – May 24, 1943) was sheriff of Norfolk County, Massachusetts from 1898 to 1939.

== Biography ==
Samuel Capen was born in Canton, Massachusetts on March 12, 1848.

He served as sheriff of Norfolk County, Massachusetts from 1898 to 1939.

He died at his home in Dedham on May 24, 1943, and was buried at Canton Corner Cemetery.
