= Peter McCormack (handballer) =

Peter McCormack (1923 – 16 December 2008) was an Irish sportsperson.

A resident of Balla and Ballyhaunis, McCormack was one of Mayo's most notable handballers in former times. In 1951 Peter and his brother Tom won the All Ireland Junior Softball doubles title, an achievement which was celebrated with much enthusiasm and local pride at the time.
