= Peter M. McCormack =

American politician and court officer (1919-1988)

Norfolk County, Massachusetts Sheriff
- In office 1959–1960
- Preceded by: Samuel H. Wragg
- Succeeded by: Charles Hedges

Member of the Massachusetts Senate for the Norfolk and Suffolk District
- In office 1959–1959
- Preceded by: Philip G. Bowker
- Succeeded by: Joseph Silvano

Personal details
- Born: April 22, 1919 Brookline, Massachusetts
- Died: January 28, 1988 (aged 68) Cambridge, Massachusetts
- Party: Democratic
- Education: Brookline High School

Peter Michael McCormack (April 22, 1919 – January 28, 1988) was an American court officer and politician who served as sheriff of Norfolk County, Massachusetts, from 1959 to 1960 and was a member of the Massachusetts Senate in 1959.

== Early life ==
McCormack was born on April 22, 1919, in Brookline, Massachusetts. He attended Saint Mary of the Assumption School and Brookline High School. During World War II, McCormack served in the United States Army. He served four and a half years with the Americal Division in the South Pacific. In 1944, he married Mary Wilson, then an ensign in the United States Navy Nurse Corps. After the war, McCormack worked as a court officer at the Brookline District Court.

== Political career ==
In 1956, McCormack was the Democratic nominee for sheriff of Norfolk County, but lost to incumbent Samuel H. Wragg by 33,000 votes. In 1958 he upset incumbent state senator Philip G. Bowker to represent the Norfolk and Suffolk District. Wragg died on May 13, 1959, and six days later, Governor Foster Furcolo appointed McCormack to finish Wragg's term. McCormack chose to wait until the end of the 1959 legislative session to assume office. He was sworn in on November 19, 1959. In 1960, McCormack was defeated by Republican state senator Charles W. Hedges 128,319 votes to 117,843.

== Later life ==
In 1962, McCormack was appointed executive director of the Brookline Housing Authority. In 1970 he became vice president and director of security of Chamberlayne Junior College. He later served as Norfolk County's liaison officer to the state Department of Corrections until his retirement in 1977. McCormack died suddenly on January 28, 1988.
