= Norfolk County, Massachusetts =

County in Massachusetts, United States

- County
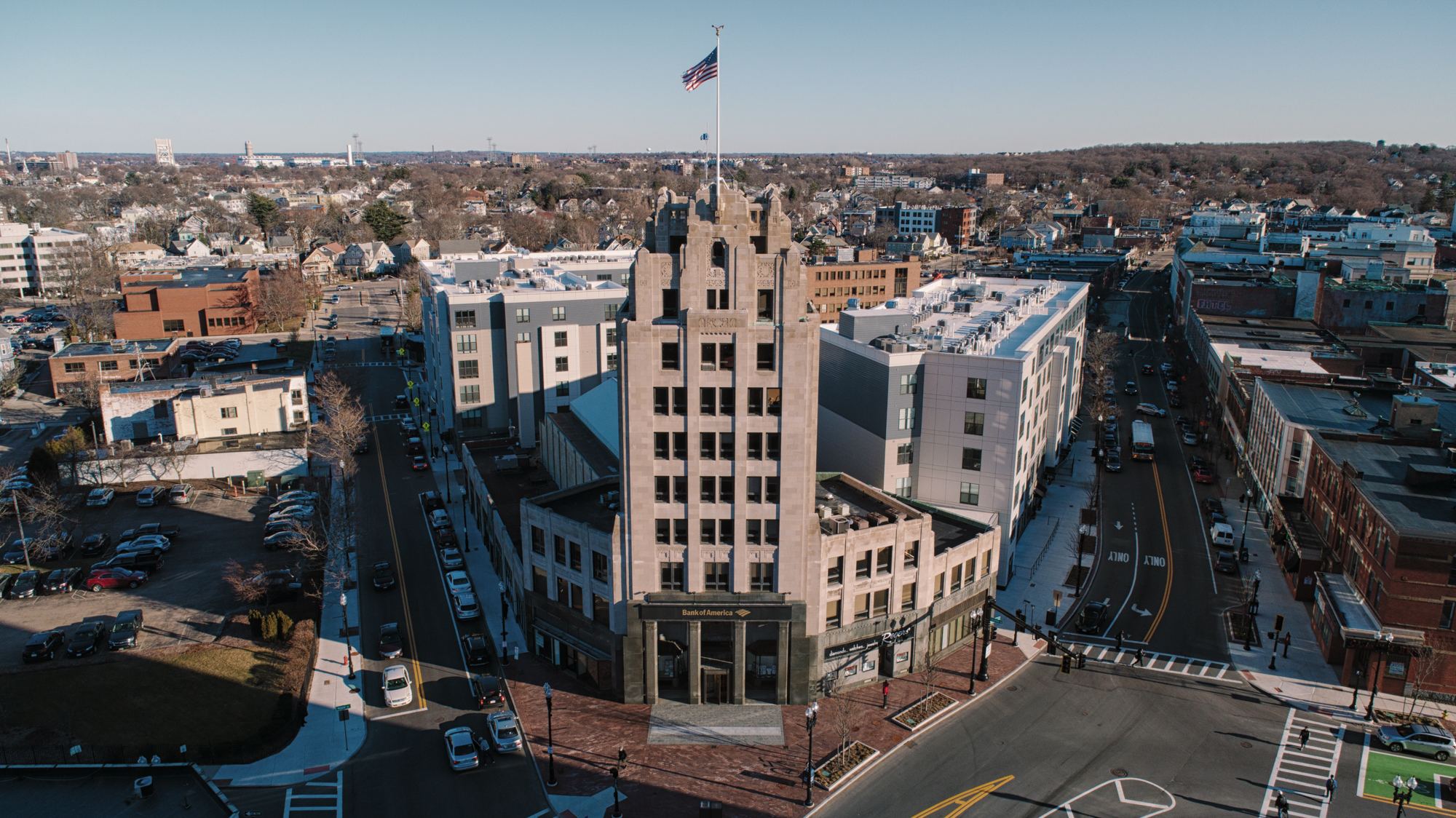
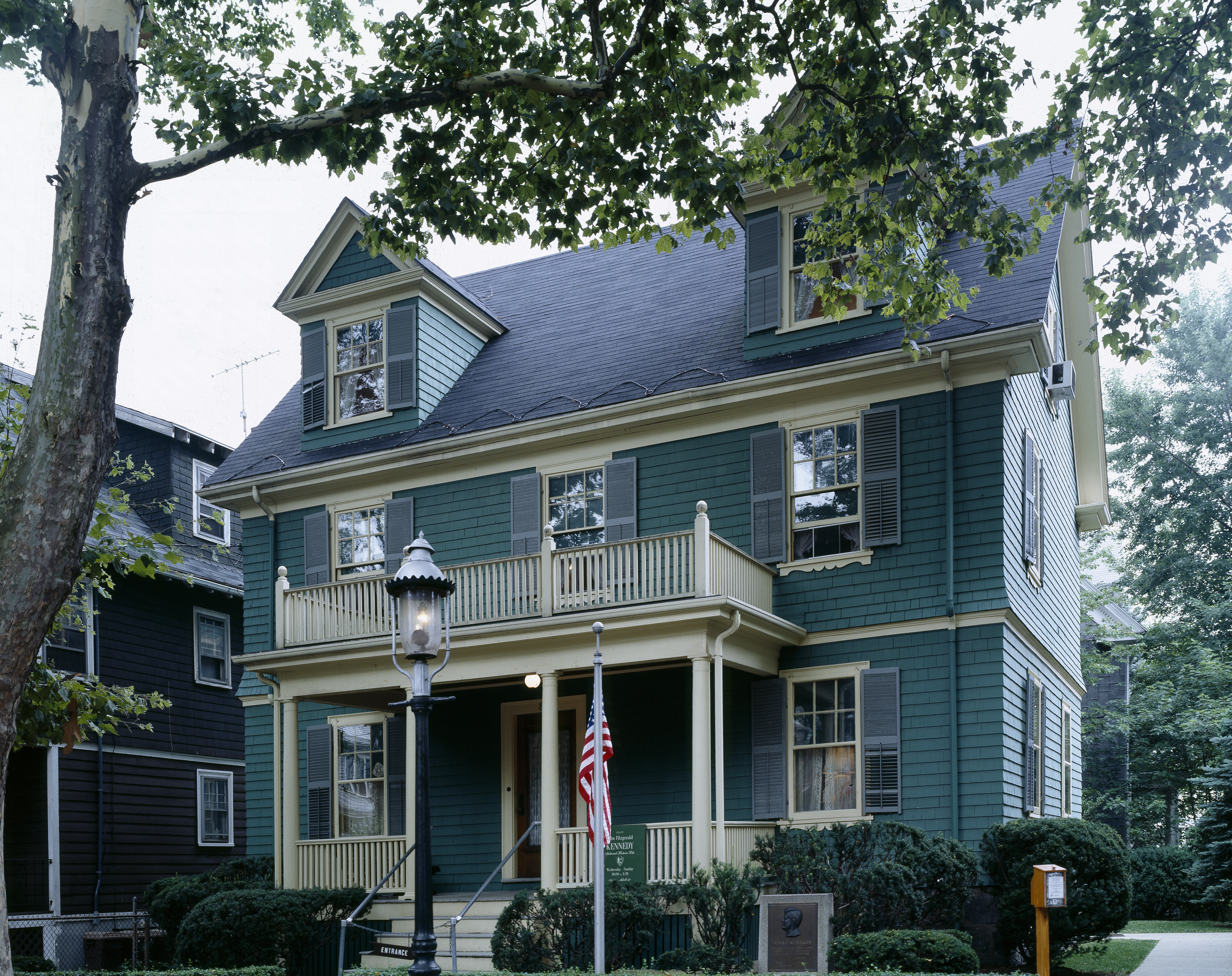
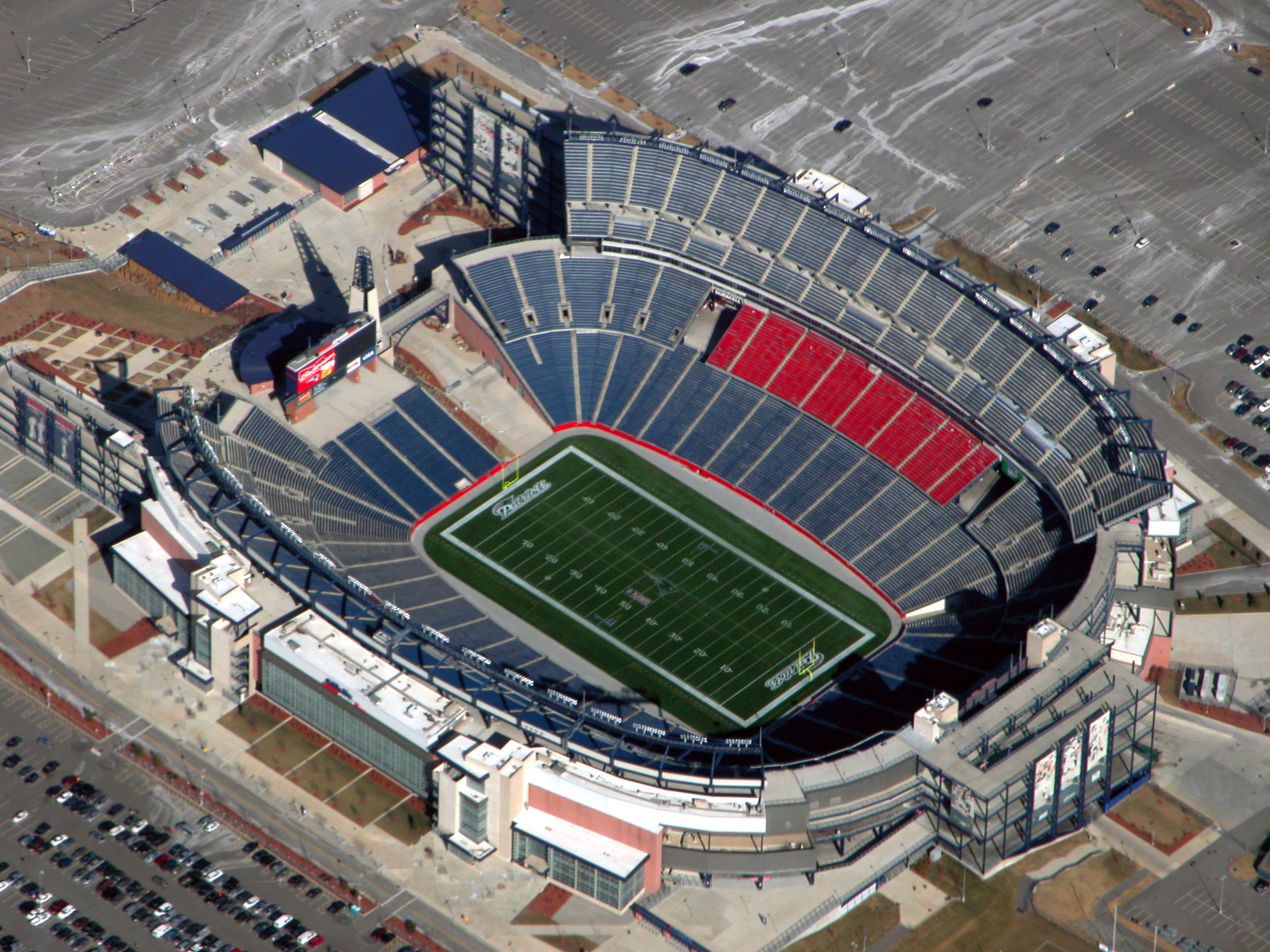
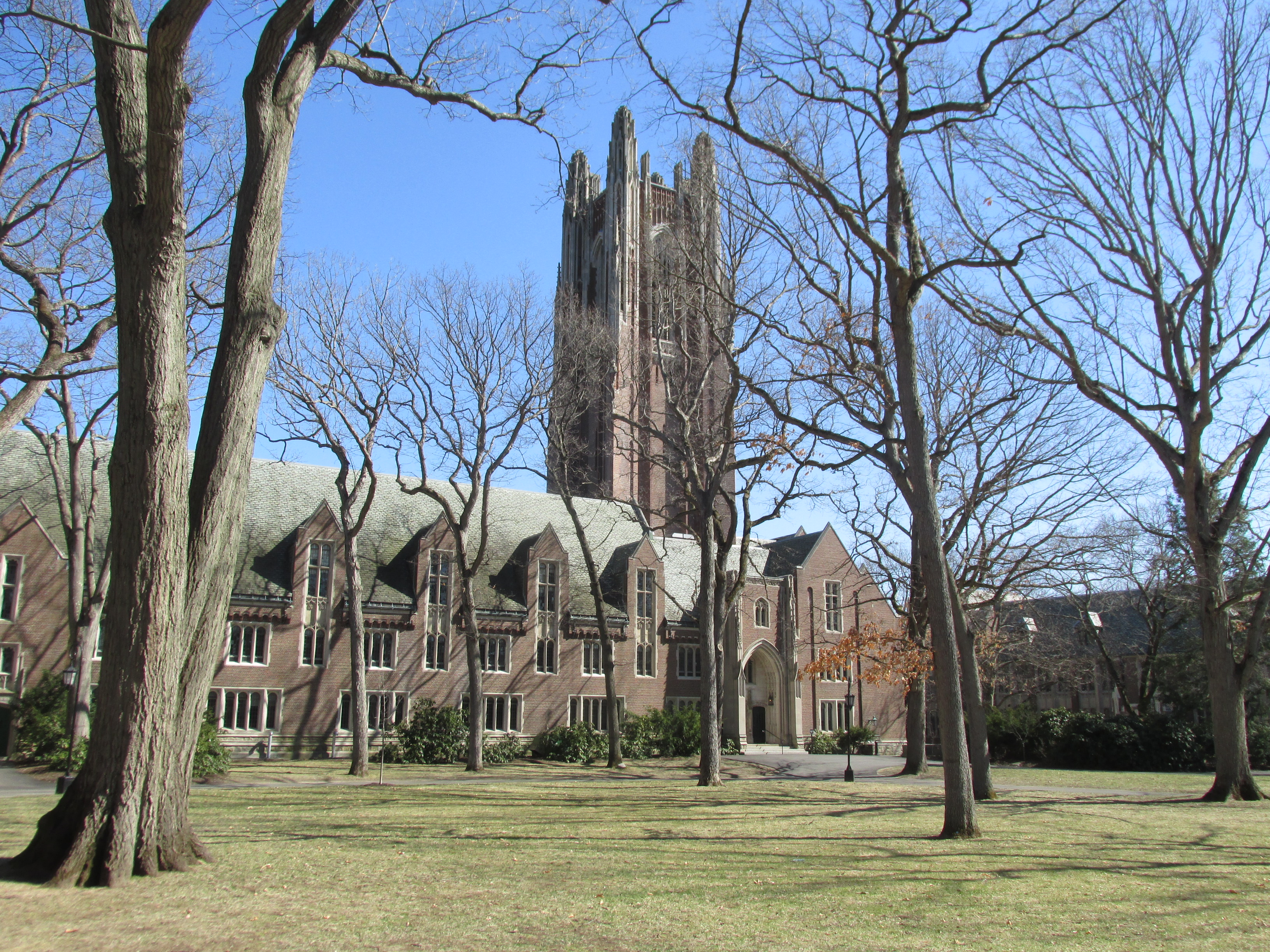
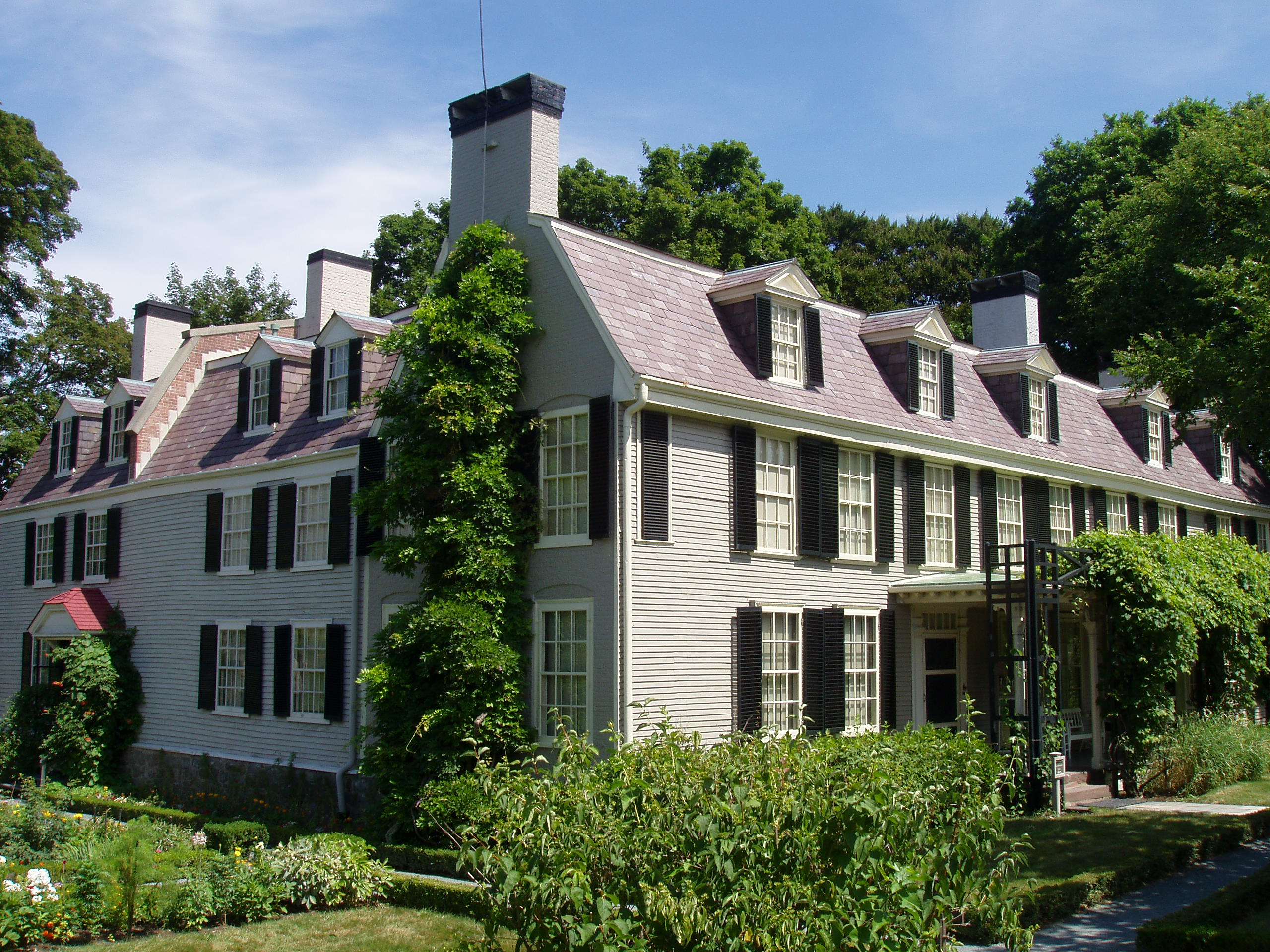
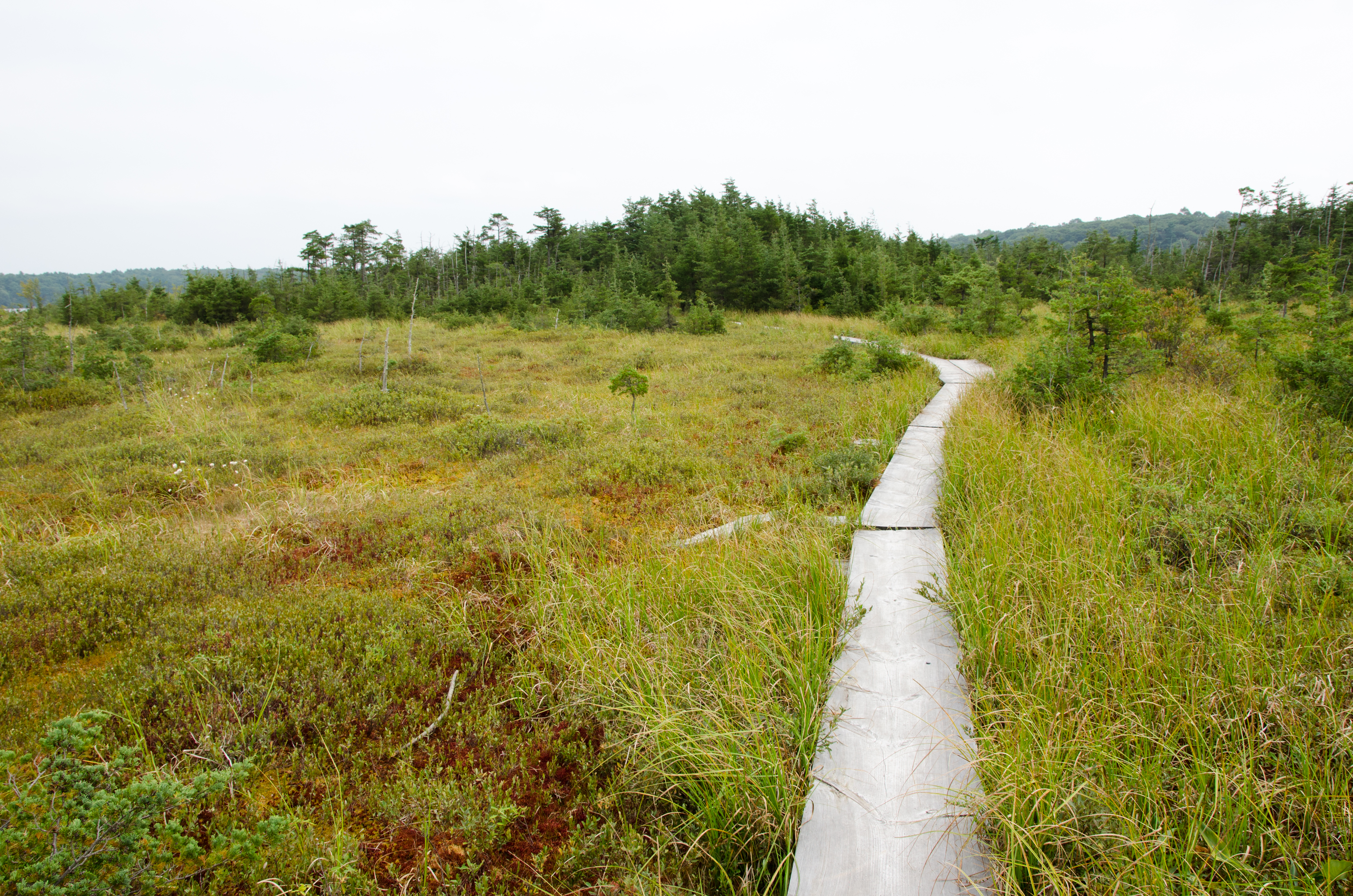
- Quincy Kennedy home Gillette Stadium Wellesley College Peacefield Blue Hills Reservation

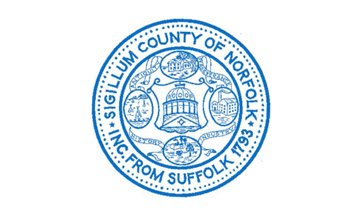
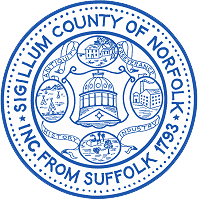
- Flag Seal
- Motto(s): Antiquity, Perseverance, History, Industry
- Location within the U.S. state of Massachusetts
- Coordinates: 42°11′57″N 71°09′16″W
- Country: United States
- State: Massachusetts
- Founded: 1793
- Named for: Norfolk, England
- Seat: Dedham
- Largest city: Quincy

Area
  - Total: 444 sq mi (1,150 km^{2})
  - Land: 396 sq mi (1,030 km^{2})
  - Water: 48 sq mi (120 km^{2}) 11%

Population (2020)
  - Total: 725,981
  - Estimate (2025): 739,749 ▲
  - Density: 1,830/sq mi (708/km^{2})
- Time zone: UTC−5 (Eastern)
  - Summer (DST): UTC−4 (EDT)
- Congressional districts: 2nd, 4th, 7th, 8th
- Website: norfolkcounty.org

Norfolk County (/ˈnɔːrfək/ NOR-fək) is a county located in the Commonwealth of Massachusetts. At the 2020 census, the population was around 725,981. Its county seat is Dedham. The county was named after the English county of the same name. Two towns, Cohasset and Brookline, are exclaves. Norfolk County is included in the Boston-Cambridge-Newton, MA-NH Metropolitan Statistical Area. Norfolk County is the 24th highest-income county in the United States with a median household income of $107,361. It is the wealthiest county in Massachusetts.

== History ==
One of the original counties of the Massachusetts Bay Colony created on May 10, 1643, was called Norfolk, and is unrelated to the current Norfolk County. It covered territory in what is now New Hampshire, and was abolished on September 18, 1679, when King Charles II separated the Colony of New Hampshire from Massachusetts.

Shortly after the Constitution of Massachusetts was adopted on October 25, 1780, a number of towns in Suffolk County, of which Dedham was then a part, elected delegates to a convention to decide upon some policy relative to the division of the county. The convention met at Gay's Tavern in Dedham on December 12, 1780, and adopted a resolution to the effect that the towns of Bellingham, Dedham, Foxborough, Franklin, Medfield, Medway, Needham, Stoughton, Stoughtonham, Walpole, and Wrentham, along with the Middlesex County towns of Holliston, Hopkinton, Natick, and Sherborn ought to be formed into a new county with Medfield as the shiretown. The Great and General Court did not look favorably upon the resolution, however, and no new county was then created.

Norfolk County, Massachusetts was created on June 20, 1793. Legislation passed in March which separated off all the towns in Suffolk County except Boston and Chelsea (which at the time included what are now Revere and Winthrop). Dedham was designated as the "shire town". Hingham and Hull petitioned to remain in Suffolk County and on the day the law was to take effect, their removal to Norfolk County was repealed, making Cohasset an exclave. In 1803, they were moved into Plymouth County, Massachusetts.

On June 22, 1797, the town of Natick was given to Middlesex County, and the town of Needham was transferred from Middlesex to Norfolk. The towns of Dorchester and Roxbury were part of Norfolk County when it was created but, as Boston annexed each town in stages from 1804 to 1912, they became part of Suffolk County again, leaving Brookline separated from the rest of Norfolk County. No other changes have been made to the territory of Norfolk County, other than new municipalities being created within its boundaries, and minor border adjustments.

Norfolk County is the birthplace of four Presidents of the United States (John Adams, John Quincy Adams, John F. Kennedy, and George H. W. Bush), resulting in the moniker "County of Presidents."

=== Jails ===
Following the creation of the county, Gay's Tavern was the site of a Court of General Sessions on August 25, 1794. They ordered that the committee on buildings proceed with collecting materials for building a jail. On the last day of September following this order, the court accepted from Timothy Gay (Note: Timothy Gay Jr. was the jail keeper and was indicted, but acquitted, in the escape of Jason Fairbanks.) the gift of a parallelogram lot of land to erect the Norfolk County Jail next to his tavern.

It was replaced by a new Norfolk County Jail in 1817. The two-story stone building was built in 1817 and was 33' square. Part of the jail was torn down in 1851 to erect a central, octagonal portion and two wings. It resulted in a building with the shape of a Latin cross, and featured Gothic Revival windows. The three tiers of cells radiated out like spokes from the central guardroom. There were two hangings in the central rotunda: George C. Hersey on August 8, 1862, and James H. Costley on June 25, 1875.

Inmates were housed in the jail until 1992 when the Norfolk County Correctional Center was opened in 1992. A court forced the closure after 13 inmates escaped in 1989. There were at least 27 break outs during the prison's history.

The current Norfolk County Correctional Center is located on the median of Route 128 in Dedham. The facility has 502 beds and opened in 1992.

=== Courthouses ===
After the creation of the county, the Court of Common Pleas and the Court of General Sessions of the Peace first met in Dedham's meetinghouse. Nathaniel Ames was chosen as the clerk of both and they met for the first time on September 23. (Note: Hanson is not clear in which year they first met.)

When the court met on January 7, 1794, it was so cold in the building, which lacked any sort of heating, that they moved to the Woodward Tavern across the street. The Anglican Church in town had also offered their building, but it was in such a state of disrepair that the offer was not accepted. The First Church and Parish in Dedham then offered a piece of land on their Little Common, and a new courthouse was ordered to be constructed. Construction was sluggish, however, and the delays frustrated Ames.

The court was still sitting in the meetinghouse in 1794 but the new courthouse was completed in 1795. It was found to be too small, however, and the ceilings were so low as to stifle people in the courtrooms. Charles Bulfinch was hired in 1795 to design a turret for the building and Paul Revere was commissioned to cast a bell. (Note: The bell was moved to the new courthouse, and the last record of the cupola was in 1817. It disappeared sometime after that.)

When it became apparent that the Courthouse was out of date, the County Commissioners ordered a new one to be built. They originally were seeking a utilitarian building that would be fireproof and safe to store important documents. Local boosters, however, wanted a building that aligned with the town's rapidly improving self-image.

The land for the courthouse, across the street from the existing one, was purchased from Frances Ames for $1,200. Ames later refused to sell the lot to the east at an asking price of $400, however. Masonic ceremonies, bell ringing and cannon fire accompanied the laying of the cornerstone on July 4, 1825. In 1827, the old courthouse was sold at public auction.

The new building was designed by Solomon Willard and was dedicated on February 20, 1827. It was a basic rectangular granite-walled structure, 48' by 98' and two stories tall, with Greek-temple porticoes at either end. Each 10' portico was supported by four Doric pillars. A bell made by Paul Revere was moved from the old courthouse to the new north portico, where it was tolled to announce court sessions.

The interior had a hall running through the center paved with brick. On the eastern side were the offices of the Country Treasurer and the Clerk of Courts. On the western side were the Registry of Deeds and Probate Court. The courtroom was upstairs and featured an arched ceiling. The high sheriff had a desk in the room.

From the outside it was an attractive building, but it was not a comfortable place to work. The only water was provided by a well on Court Street, and it did not have an adequate heating system. One employee complained that it was "barren and destitute of every convenience, demanded for health, comfort and decency." In 1846, an iron fence was installed around the perimeter.

=== Registry of Deeds ===
The Registry was originally housed in one of the first floor rooms of the home of Eliphalet Pond, the first registrar, at 963 Washington Street in Dedham. A sign was nailed to a tree out front informing the public of its location. It then moved to the original Norfolk County Courthouse and remained there for about three decades. When the new Norfolk County Courthouse was built in 1827, the middle office on the west side of the lower level was used by the Registry. When the population of the county grew and the number of real estate transactions increased apace, a new building was constructed for the Registry across the street at 649 High Street. The Boston firm Peabody & Stearns was hired to design the current Registry of Deeds, built in 1905. The main section of the building measures 52 feet by 186 feet, is two stories high with a copper hipped roof, and is built of Indiana limestone with details made of granite from Deer Isle, Maine.

== Geography ==
According to the U.S. Census Bureau, the county has a total area of 444 square miles (1,150 km^{2}), of which 396 square miles (1,030 km^{2}) is land and 48 square miles (120 km^{2}) (11%) is water. It is the third-smallest county in Massachusetts by total area. The county is not completely contiguous; the towns of Brookline and Cohasset are each part of Norfolk County but are separated from the majority of Norfolk County (and each other) by either water or other counties. At the county's formation, Hingham and Hull were to be part of it, but joined Plymouth County instead, leaving Cohasset as the initial exclave of Norfolk County and an enclave of Plymouth County. Brookline became the second exclave of Norfolk County in 1873 when the neighboring town of West Roxbury was annexed by Boston (thus leaving Norfolk County to join Suffolk County) and Brookline refused to be annexed by Boston after the Brookline-Boston annexation debate of 1873.

=== Adjacent counties ===
- Middlesex County (northwest)
- Suffolk County (north)
- Plymouth County (southeast)
- Bristol County (south)
- Providence County, Rhode Island (southwest)
- Worcester County (west)

=== National protected areas ===
- Adams National Historical Park
- Boston Harbor Islands National Recreation Area (part)
- Frederick Law Olmsted National Historic Site
- John Fitzgerald Kennedy National Historic Site

=== Major highways ===
- I-90 / Mass Pike
- I-93
- I-95
- I-495
- US 1
- US 20
- Route 1A
- Route 2
- Route 3
  - Route 3A
- Route 9
- Route 16
- Route 18
- Route 24
- Route 27
- Route 28
- Route 37
- Route 53
- Route 58
- Route 106
- Route 109
- Route 115
- Route 121
- Route 126
- Route 128
- Route 135
- Route 138
- Route 139
- Route 140
- Route 152
- Route 228

== Demographics ==
Historical population
| Census | Pop. | Note | %± |
|---|---|---|---|
| 1800 | 27,216 | | — |
| 1810 | 31,245 | | 14.8% |
| 1820 | 36,471 | | 16.7% |
| 1830 | 41,972 | | 15.1% |
| 1840 | 53,140 | | 26.6% |
| 1850 | 78,892 | | 48.5% |
| 1860 | 109,950 | | 39.4% |
| 1870 | 89,443 | | −18.7% |
| 1880 | 96,507 | | 7.9% |
| 1890 | 118,950 | | 23.3% |
| 1900 | 151,539 | | 27.4% |
| 1910 | 187,506 | | 23.7% |
| 1920 | 219,081 | | 16.8% |
| 1930 | 299,426 | | 36.7% |
| 1940 | 325,180 | | 8.6% |
| 1950 | 392,308 | | 20.6% |
| 1960 | 510,256 | | 30.1% |
| 1970 | 605,051 | | 18.6% |
| 1980 | 606,587 | | 0.3% |
| 1990 | 616,087 | | 1.6% |
| 2000 | 650,308 | | 5.6% |
| 2010 | 670,850 | | 3.2% |
| 2020 | 725,981 | | 8.2% |
| 2025 (est.) | 739,749 | ▲ | 1.9% |
U.S. Decennial Census; 1790-1960 1900-1990; 1990-2000 2010-2020

=== 2020 census ===
As of the 2020 census, the county had a population of 725,981. Of the residents, 20.5% were under the age of 18 and 17.7% were 65 years of age or older; the median age was 41.2 years. For every 100 females there were 92.3 males, and for every 100 females age 18 and over there were 89.4 males. 98.0% of residents lived in urban areas and 2.0% lived in rural areas.

The racial makeup of the county was 71.6% White, 7.1% Black or African American, 0.2% American Indian and Alaska Native, 12.2% Asian, 0.0% Native Hawaiian and Pacific Islander, 2.6% from some other race, and 6.4% from two or more races. Hispanic or Latino residents of any race comprised 5.2% of the population.

There were 278,326 households in the county, of which 30.3% had children under the age of 18 living with them and 27.5% had a female householder with no spouse or partner present. About 26.9% of all households were made up of individuals and 12.3% had someone living alone who was 65 years of age or older.

There were 291,489 housing units, of which 4.5% were vacant. Among occupied housing units, 66.3% were owner-occupied and 33.7% were renter-occupied. The homeowner vacancy rate was 0.8% and the rental vacancy rate was 5.4%.

=== Racial and ethnic composition ===
Norfolk County, Massachusetts – Racial and ethnic composition Note: the US Census treats Hispanic/Latino as an ethnic category. This table excludes Latinos from the racial categories and assigns them to a separate category. Hispanics/Latinos may be of any race.
| Race / Ethnicity (NH = Non-Hispanic) | Pop 1980 | Pop 1990 | Pop 2000 | Pop 2010 | Pop 2020 | % 1980 | % 1990 | % 2000 | % 2010 | % 2020 |
|---|---|---|---|---|---|---|---|---|---|---|
| White alone (NH) | 588,067 | 577,079 | 571,733 | 538,758 | 512,421 | 96.95% | 93.67% | 87.92% | 80.31% | 70.58% |
| Black or African American alone (NH) | 5,829 | 11,532 | 20,106 | 36,329 | 49,311 | 0.96% | 1.87% | 3.09% | 5.42% | 6.79% |
| Native American or Alaska Native alone (NH) | 506 | 734 | 716 | 811 | 701 | 0.08% | 0.12% | 0.11% | 0.12% | 0.10% |
| Asian alone (NH) | 6,001 | 17,686 | 35,643 | 57,625 | 88,240 | 0.99% | 2.87% | 5.48% | 8.59% | 12.15% |
| Native Hawaiian or Pacific Islander alone (NH) | x | x | 122 | 107 | 142 | x | x | 0.02% | 0.02% | 0.02% |
| Other race alone (NH) | 1,567 | 642 | 2,101 | 4,117 | 7,344 | 0.26% | 0.10% | 0.32% | 0.61% | 1.01% |
| Mixed race or Multiracial (NH) | x | x | 7,897 | 11,099 | 29,712 | x | x | 1.21% | 1.65% | 4.09% |
| Hispanic or Latino (any race) | 4,617 | 8,414 | 11,990 | 22,004 | 38,110 | 0.76% | 1.37% | 1.84% | 3.28% | 5.25% |
| Total | 606,587 | 616,087 | 650,308 | 670,850 | 725,981 | 100.00% | 100.00% | 100.00% | 100.00% | 100.00% |

=== American Community Survey 2025 data ===
The United States Census Bureau estimated that in 2025, Norfolk County’s population was 739.749. It was also estimated that the county's population was 67,87% Non-Hispanic White, 6,60% Hispanic or Latino, 8,38% Non-Hispanic Black, 14,07% Asian, 0,11% Native American, 0,03% Pacific Islander, and 2,93% Multiracial.

| Total | Population | Percentage |
|---|---|---|
| Non-Hispanic White | 502.090 | 67,87% |
| Hispanic or Latino | 48.818 | 6,60% |
| Non-Hispanic Black | 62.015 | 8,38% |
| Asian | 104.105 | 14,07% |
| Native American | 849 | 0,11% |
| Pacific Islander | 215 | 0,03% |
| Non-Hispanic Multiracial | 21.657 | 2,93% |

=== 2010 census ===
As of the 2010 United States census, there were 670,850 people, 257,914 households, and 168,903 families residing in the county. The population density was 1,693.6 inhabitants per square mile (653.9/km^{2}). There were 270,359 housing units at an average density of 682.5 per square mile (263.5/km^{2}). The racial makeup of the county was 82.3% white, 8.6% Asian, 5.7% black or African American, 0.2% American Indian, 1.3% from other races, and 1.9% from two or more races. Those of Hispanic or Latino origin made up 3.3% of the population. The largest ancestry groups were:

- 31.8% Irish
- 15.5% Italian
- 11.0% English
- 7.0% German
- 4.6% French
- 4.3% Chinese
- 4.1% Polish
- 3.2% Russian
- 3.1% American
- 2.8% Scottish
- 2.6% French Canadian
- 2.4% Scotch-Irish
- 2.0% West Indian
- 2.0% Sub-Saharan African
- 1.9% Portuguese
- 1.8% Swedish
- 1.6% Indian
- 1.4% Arab
- 1.4% Greek
- 1.2% Canadian
- 1.1% Vietnamese
- 1.1% Lithuanian

Of the 257,914 households, 32.2% had children under the age of 18 living with them, 52.0% were married couples living together, 10.1% had a female householder with no husband present, 34.5% were non-families, and 27.6% of households were made up of individuals. The average household size was 2.53 and the average family size was 3.15. The median age was 40.7 years.

The median income for a household in the county was $81,027 and the median family income was $101,870. Males had a median income of $68,070 versus $51,870 for females. The per capita income for the county was $42,371. About 4.1% of families and 6.2% of the population were below the poverty line, including 6.3% of those under age 18 and 6.9% of those age 65 or over.

=== 2000 census ===
At the 2000 census there were 650,308 people, 248,827 households, and 165,967 families residing in the county. The population density was 1,628 inhabitants per square mile (629/km^{2}). There were 255,154 housing units at an average density of 639 per square mile (247/km^{2}). The racial makeup of the county was 89.02% White or European American, 3.18% Black or African American, 0.13% Native American, 5.50% Asian, 0.02% Pacific Islander, 0.78% from other races, and 1.37% from two or more races. 1.84%. were Hispanic or Latino of any race. 28.6% were of Irish, 13.4% Italian, 7.7% English and 5.0% descendants of colonists ancestry according to Census 2000. 85.7% spoke only English at home, while 2.3% spoke Chinese in any dialect, 2.0% Spanish, 1.0% Italian and 1.0% French at home.

Of the 248,827 households 31.20% had children under the age of 18 living with them, 54.20% were married couples living together, 9.50% had a female householder with no husband present, and 33.30% were non-families. 26.80% of households were one person and 10.80% were one person aged 65 or older. The average household size was 2.54 and the average family size was 3.14.

The age distribution was 23.40% under the age of 18, 7.00% from 18 to 24, 31.60% from 25 to 44, 23.50% from 45 to 64, and 14.40% 65 or older. The median age was 38 years. For every 100 females, there were 91.40 males. For every 100 females age 18 and over, there were 87.60 males.

The median household income was $63,432 and the median family income was $77,847 (these figures had risen to $77,294 and $95,243 respectively as of a 2007 estimate). Males had a median income of $51,301 versus $37,108 for females. The per capita income for the county was $32,484. About 2.90% of families and 4.60% of the population were below the poverty line, including 4.40% of those under age 18 and 5.70% of those age 65 or over.

=== Demographic breakdown by town ===
==== Income ====
The ranking of unincorporated communities that are included on the list are reflective if the census-designated locations and villages were included as cities or towns. Data is from the 2007–2011 American Community Survey 5-Year Estimates.

| Rank | Town | | Per capita income | Median household income | Median family income | Population | Number of households |
|---|---|---|---|---|---|---|---|
| | Dover | CDP | $91,039 | $183,125 | $212,125 | 2,322 | 725 |
| 1 | Dover | Town | $82,800 | $184,646 | $200,735 | 5,564 | 1,765 |
| 2 | Wellesley | Town | $65,394 | $145,208 | $175,156 | 27,818 | 8,553 |
| 3 | Brookline | Town | $63,964 | $97,250 | $142,180 | 58,371 | 24,891 |
| 4 | Needham | Town | $60,972 | $121,080 | $160,455 | 28,786 | 10,350 |
| 5 | Cohasset | Town | $59,891 | $117,831 | $147,222 | 7,483 | 2,706 |
| 6 | Westwood | Town | $59,422 | $120,078 | $151,976 | 14,508 | 5,172 |
| 7 | Medfield | Town | $56,905 | $128,446 | $139,247 | 12,004 | 4,011 |
| | Chestnut Hill (02467) | ZCTA | $55,947 | $114,140 | $151,375 | 21,952 | 6,237 |
| 8 | Sharon | Town | $53,687 | $121,265 | $142,463 | 17,538 | 6,268 |
| | Medfield | CDP | $47,660 | $107,386 | $127,632 | 6,394 | 2,357 |
| 9 | Wrentham | Town | $47,119 | $100,938 | $119,188 | 10,879 | 3,978 |
| | Sharon | CDP | $46,079 | $102,521 | $124,405 | 5,532 | 2,007 |
| 10 | Canton | Town | $45,991 | $90,951 | $111,770 | 21,408 | 8,460 |
| 11 | Milton | Town | $44,718 | $104,713 | $129,234 | 26,828 | 8,956 |
| 12 | Medway | Town | $44,472 | $106,058 | $119,864 | 12,670 | 4,433 |
| 13 | Walpole | Town | $43,983 | $90,763 | $109,035 | 23,862 | 8,626 |
| | Norfolk County | County | $43,685 | $83,733 | $106,309 | 666,426 | 255,944 |
| 14 | Norfolk | Town | $42,452 | $118,809 | $132,250 | 11,151 | 3,125 |
| 15 | Foxborough | Town | $42,236 | $92,370 | $108,209 | 16,734 | 6,470 |
| | Walpole | CDP | $41,820 | $89,327 | $99,808 | 6,119 | 2,522 |
| 16 | Dedham | Town | $41,143 | $83,364 | $105,586 | 24,521 | 9,528 |
| | Millis-Clicquot | CDP | $39,884 | $82,798 | $103,750 | 4,370 | 1,831 |
| 17 | Millis | Town | $39,344 | $90,360 | $99,976 | 7,852 | 3,043 |
| 18 | Franklin | City | $39,043 | $92,066 | $109,602 | 31,317 | 10,866 |
| 19 | Braintree | City | $37,317 | $83,710 | $97,262 | 35,409 | 13,267 |
| 20 | Plainville | Town | $36,802 | $81,371 | $102,780 | 8,176 | 3,232 |
| | Foxborough | CDP | $36,239 | $61,771 | $91,991 | 5,206 | 2,388 |
| 21 | Norwood | Town | $35,997 | $73,838 | $95,397 | 28,483 | 11,559 |
| 22 | Weymouth | City | $35,939 | $68,594 | $86,972 | 53,565 | 22,543 |
| | Massachusetts | State | $35,051 | $65,981 | $83,371 | 6,512,227 | 2,522,409 |
| | Bellingham | CDP | $33,927 | $81,941 | $87,606 | 4,580 | 1,833 |
| 23 | Bellingham | Town | $33,170 | $83,534 | $93,655 | 16,165 | 5,879 |
| 24 | Quincy | City | $32,911 | $60,947 | $77,231 | 91,484 | 39,965 |
| 25 | Stoughton | Town | $32,363 | $68,191 | $87,070 | 26,893 | 10,455 |
| 26 | Avon | Town | $31,304 | $72,880 | $89,214 | 4,341 | 1,609 |
| 27 | Holbrook | Town | $29,940 | $63,790 | $76,568 | 10,749 | 4,193 |
| 28 | Randolph | City | $29,210 | $64,465 | $77,661 | 31,867 | 12,041 |
| | United States | Country | $27,915 | $52,762 | $64,293 | 306,603,772 | 114,761,359 |

=== Religion ===
Religious Affiliation in Norfolk County
| Year | 1980 | | 1990 | | 2000 | | 2010 | |
| Religion | C* | A** | C | A | C | A | C | A |
|---|---|---|---|---|---|---|---|---|
| Anabaptist (Mennonite) | n/a | n/a | 1 | 88 | 1 | 45 | n/a | n/a |
| Ba'haism | 0 | n/a | 0 | n/a | 2 | 180 | 1 | 198 |
| Baptist | 29 | 7,063 | 29 | 7,936 | 32 | 4,992 | 46 | 5,558 |
| Brethren | 3 | 95 | 1 | 50 | 0 | n/a | 0 | n/a |
| Buddhism | n/a | n/a | n/a | n/a | 4 | n/a | 7 | 1,653 |
| Catholicism | 64 | 304,137 | 63 | 336,797 | 63 | 380,930 | 52 | 355,321 |
| Church of Jesus Christ of Latter-Day Saints | 1 | 432 | 2 | 648 | 5 | 1,150 | 4 | 1,262 |
| Congregationalism/ United Church of Christ | 35 | 16,786 | 43 | 19,016 | 41 | 22,049 | 42 | 12,879 |
| Christian Science | n/a | n/a | 7 | 350 | n/a | n/a | 5 | n/a |
| Episcopalianism/Anglicanism | 31 | 17,955 | 30 | 12,905 | 31 | 12,778 | 33 | 11,016 |
| Hinduism | n/a | n/a | n/a | n/a | 6 | n/a | 2 | 37 |
| Independent/nondenominational | n/a | n/a | 1 | 800 | n/a | n/a | 20 | 2,620 |
| Islam | n/a | n/a | n/a | n/a | 2 | 3,782 | 3 | 4,616 |
| Jainism | n/a | n/a | n/a | n/a | 1 | n/a | 1 | n/a |
| Judaism | 20 | 8,258 | 41 | 37,123 | 41 | 38,300 | 20 | 19,709 |
| Lutheranism | 13 | 4,629 | 10 | 2,843 | 8 | 2,593 | 8 | 2,227 |
| Methodism/Holiness | 25 | 7,937 | 21 | 7,114 | 24 | 7,097 | 23 | 5,667 |
| Messianic Judaism | n/a | n/a | n/a | n/a | n/a | n/a | 1 | n/a |
| Orthodoxy | n/a | n/a | 3 | n/a | 7 | 7,543 | 9 | 3,539 |
| Pentecostalism | 5 | 945 | 5 | 1,382 | 12 | 2,540 | 17 | 2,485 |
| Presbyterianism | 4 | 1,380 | 7 | 1,424 | 7 | 1,558 | 9 | 1,196 |
| Seventh-day Adventism/ Jehovah's Witnesses | 1 | 52 | 7 | 2,900 | 5 | 367 | 8 | 537 |
| Sikhism | n/a | n/a | n/a | n/a | 2 | n/a | 1 | n/a |
| Quakerism | 1 | 192 | 1 | 190 | 2 | 106 | 2 | 224 |
| Unitarian-Universalism | 18 | 4,719 | 17 | 4,591 | 17 | 2,644 | 17 | 3,102 |
| Zoroastranianism | n/a | n/a | n/a | n/a | n/a | n/a | 0 | 16 |

*congregations
**adherents

== Government ==
Norfolk County buildings

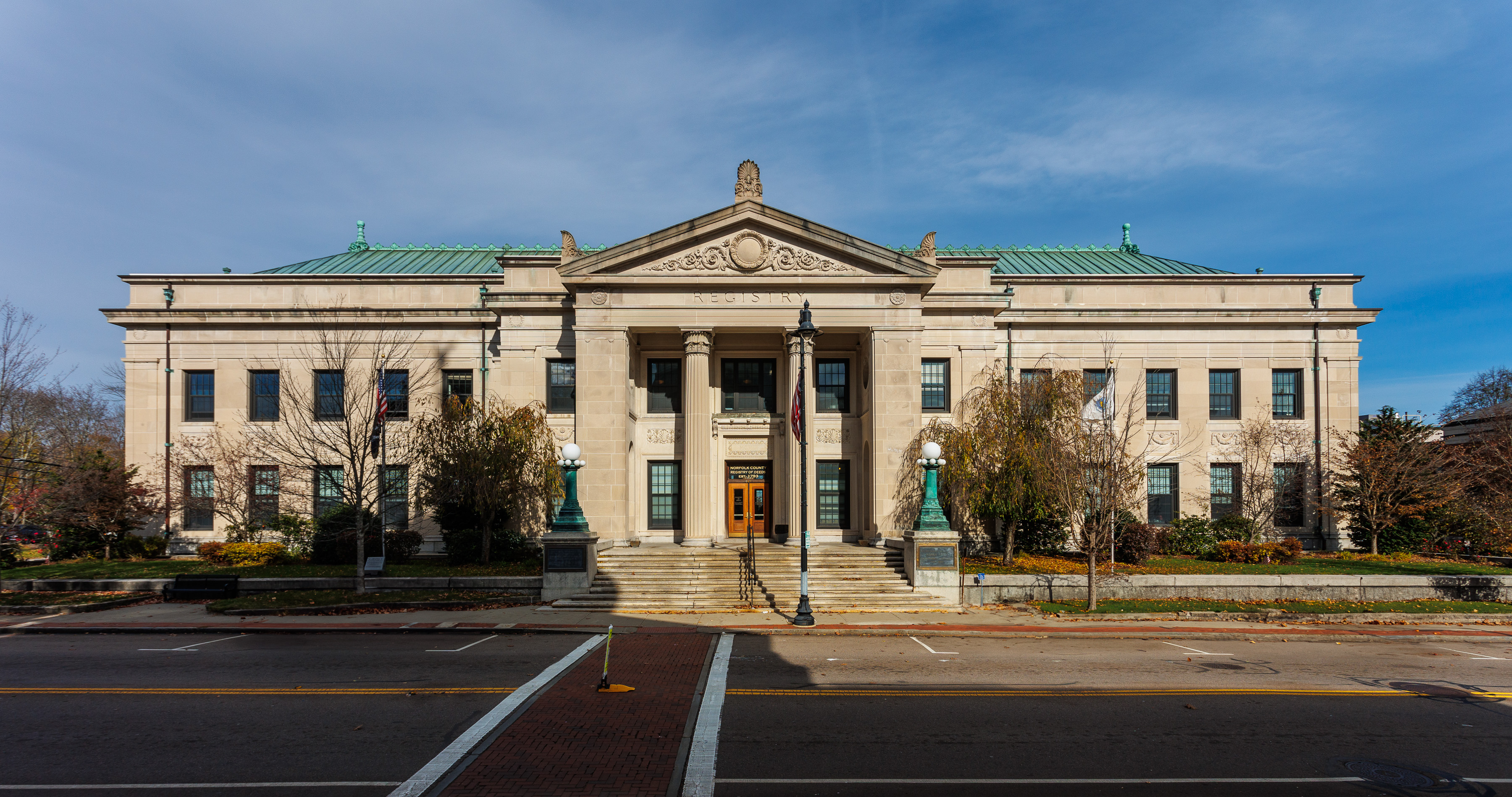
Registry of Deeds

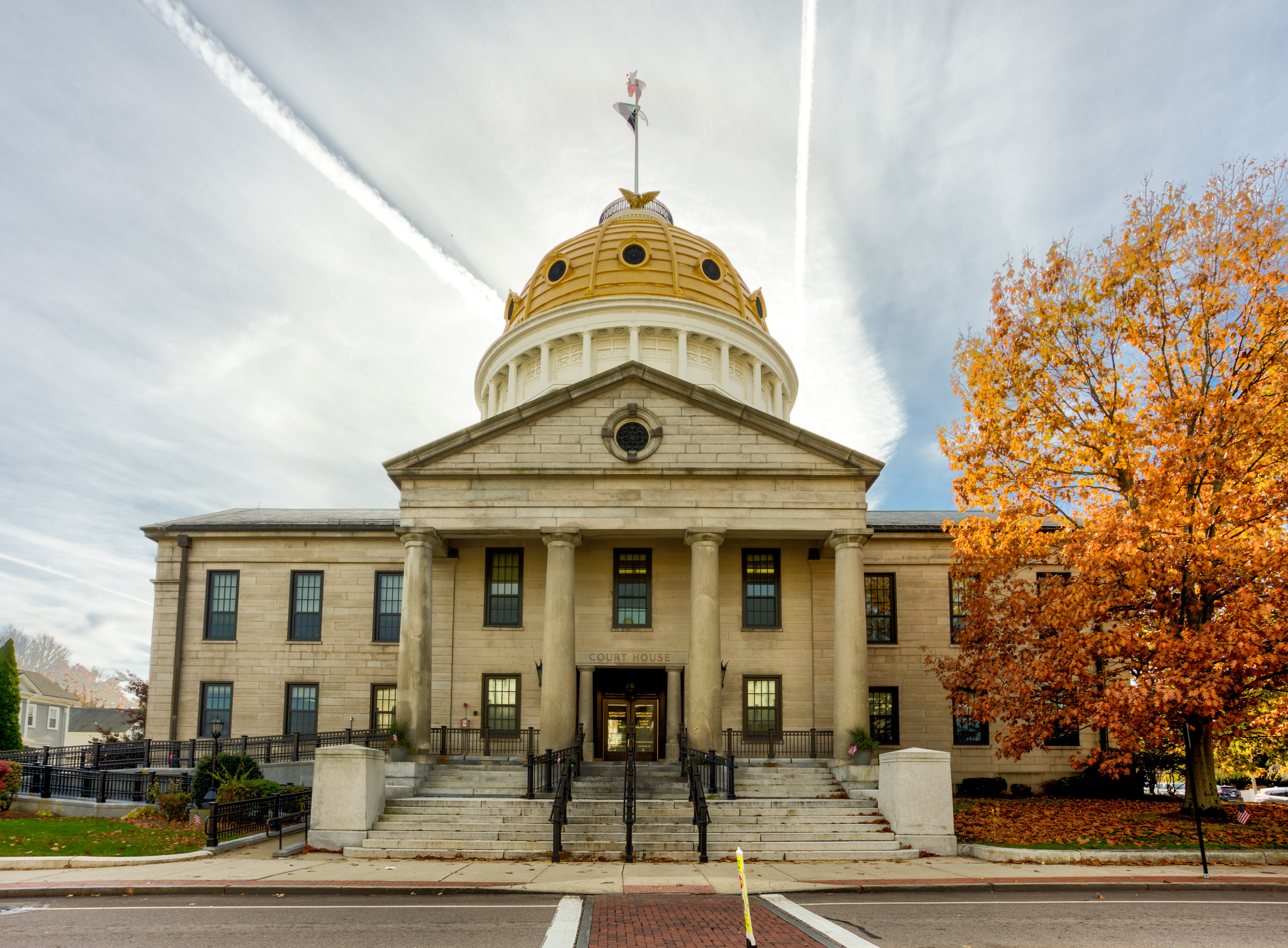
County Courthouse

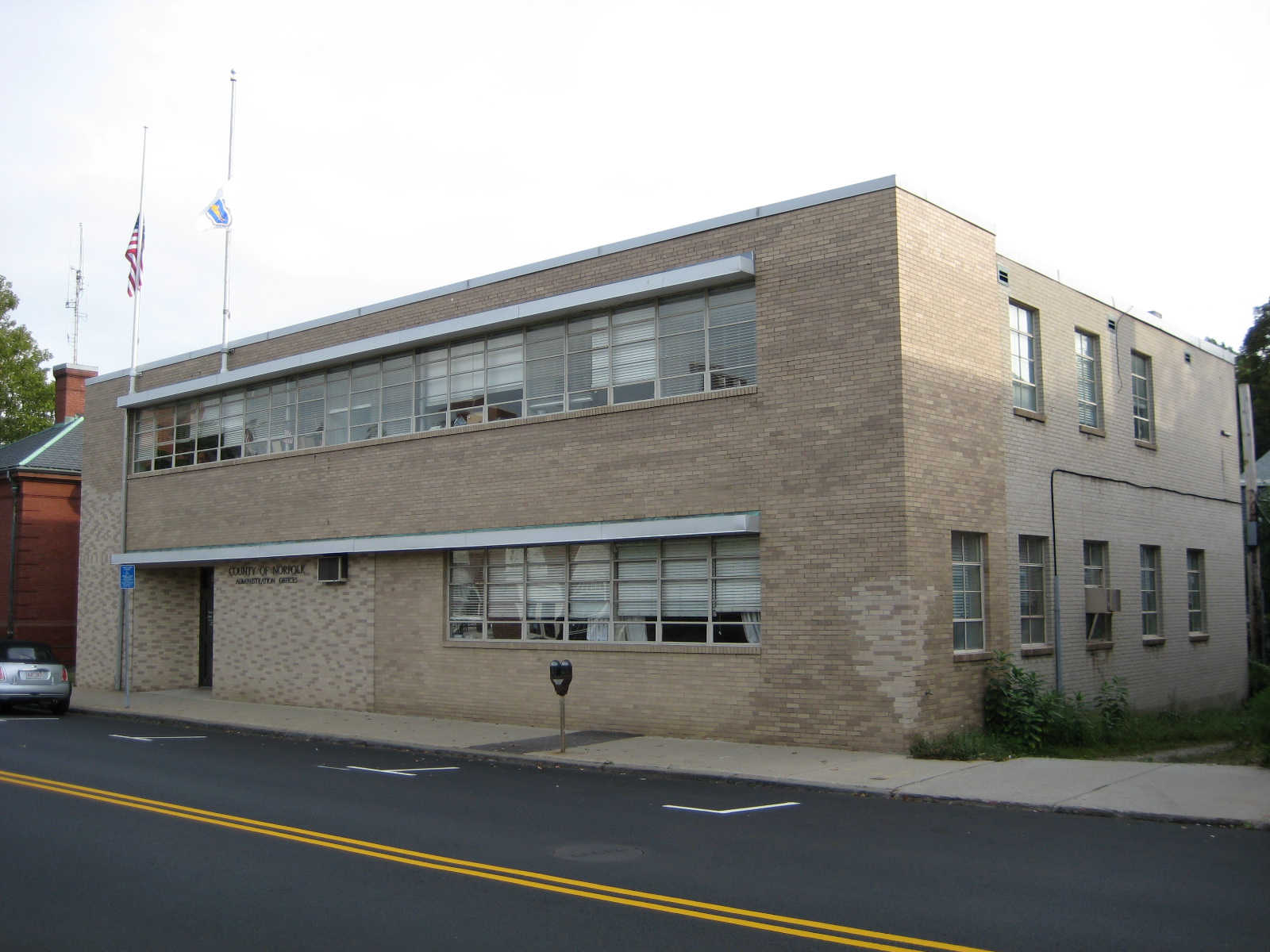
County Administration Offices

The county has offices in Dedham Square. It runs the Norfolk County Correctional Center, the Norfolk County Registry of Deeds, and the Norfolk County Courthouse.

=== Current elected officials ===
All eligible voters of Norfolk County vote for three County Commissioners, a District Attorney, a Clerk of Courts, a Register of Deeds, a Sheriff, a County Treasurer, and a Register of Probate.

County Commissioners are elected for a four-year term; two Commissioners are elected to coincide with presidential elections, and one Commissioner is elected during the midterm elections. All three Commissioners must hail from a different municipality. The District Attorney is elected every four years coinciding with the midterm elections. The Clerk of Courts and Register of Deeds are elected every six years coinciding with the elections of Class I US Senators. The County Treasurer and Register of Probate are elected every six years coinciding with the elections of Class II US Senators. The Sheriff is elected every six years coinciding with the elections of Class III US Senators.

| Office | Current Officeholder | Hometown | Next Election |
|---|---|---|---|
| County Commissioners | Richard R. Staiti (Democratic) | Canton | 2024 |
| County Commissioners | Joseph P. Shea (Democratic) | Quincy | 2024 |
| County Commissioners | Peter H. Collins (Democratic) | Milton | 2026 |
| District Attorney | Michael W. Morrissey (Democratic) | Quincy | 2026 |
| Clerk of Courts | Walter F. Timilty Jr. (Democratic) | Milton | 2024 |
| Register of Deeds | William P. O'Donnell (Democratic) | Norwood | 2024 |
| Sheriff | Patrick W. McDermott (Democratic) | Quincy | 2028 |
| County Treasurer | Michael G. Bellotti (Democratic) | Quincy | 2026 |
| Register of Probate | Colleen M Brierley (Democratic) | Norwood | 2026 |

=== Sheriffs ===
There have been 21 sheriffs of Norfolk County.

| Years | Sheriff |
|---|---|
| 2021–Present | Patrick W. McDermott |
| 2018–2021 | Jerome P. McDermott |
| 1999–2018 | Michael G. Bellotti |
| 1996–1999 | John H. Flood |
| 1975–1996 | Clifford H. Marshall |
| 1961–1975 | Charles Hedges |
| 1958–1961 | Peter M. McCormack |
| 1939–1958 | Samuel Wragg |
| 1898–1939 | Samuel Capen |
| 1885–1898 | Augustus B. Endicott |
| 1878–1885 | Rufus Corbin Wood |
| 1857–1878 | John W. Thomas |
| 1853–1857 | Thomas Adams |
| 1852–1853 | John W. Thomas |
| 1848–1852 | Thomas Adams |
| 1843–1848 | Jerauld N. E. Mann |
| 1834–1843 | John Baker, II |
| 1812–1834 | Elijah Crane |
| 1811–1812 | William Brewer |
| 1810–1811 | Elijah Crane |
| 1798–1810 | Benjamin Clark Cutler |
| 1794–1798 | Atherton Thayer |
| 1793–1794 | Ebeneezer Thayer |

=== Treasurers ===
| Years | Treasurer |
|---|---|
| 2021–Present | Michael G. Bellotti |
| 2017–2021 | James E. Timilty |
| 2002-2017 | Joseph Connolly |
| 1997–2002 | Tim Cahill |
| 1907- | Henry D. Humphrey |
| 1889-1907 | Charles W. Smith |
| April 1855-1889 | Chauncey C. Churchill |
| 1793-1809 | Isaac Bullard |

| Years | Register |
|---|---|
| 2002–present | William P. O'Donnell |
| 2001-2002 | Paul D. Harold |
| 1970-2001 | Barry T. Hannon |
| 1947-1970 | L. Thomas Shine |
| 1917-1947 | Walter W. Chambers |
| 1916-1917 | Edward L. Burdakin |
| 1874-1916 | John H. Burdakin |
| 1861-1874 | James Foord |
| 1821-1861 | Enos Foord (Note: Foord lived on School Street near the Centre School and Franklin Square in Dedham. He was the father of James. His wife "was an active, sprightly woman, who was interested in every good social enterprise.") |
| 1813-1821 | James Foord (Note: Foord was the son of Enos. He moved to California following his father's death with his mother.) |
| 1793-1813 | Eliphalet Pond Jr. (Note: Pond was the son of Eliphalet Pond.) |

== Politics ==
Like the rest of Massachusetts, Norfolk County is a Democratic stronghold in terms of federal politics. The last time it voted for a Republican presidential candidate was in 1984, during Ronald Reagan's landslide victory in which he carried every state except Minnesota.

In contrast, at the state level the county frequently supports Republican gubernatorial candidates, having done so all but once between 1990 and 2018.

Voter registration and party enrollment as of October 13, 2010
| Party | Number of voters | Percentage |
|---|---|---|
| Democratic | 159,956 | 35.28% |
| Republican | 53,556 | 11.81% |
| Unenrolled | 237,810 | 52.45% |
| Minor Parties | 2,054 | 0.45% |
| Total | 453,376 | 100% |

United States presidential election results for Norfolk County, Massachusetts
| Year | Republican | | Democratic | | Third party(ies) | |
| Year | No. | % | No. | % | No. | % |
|---|---|---|---|---|---|---|
| 1868 | 10,129 | 68.18% | 4,727 | 31.82% | 0 | 0.00% |
| 1872 | 8,526 | 67.30% | 4,142 | 32.70% | 0 | 0.00% |
| 1876 | 8,956 | 57.18% | 6,685 | 42.68% | 22 | 0.14% |
| 1880 | 10,019 | 59.70% | 6,498 | 38.72% | 265 | 1.58% |
| 1884 | 8,351 | 47.12% | 7,321 | 41.31% | 2,051 | 11.57% |
| 1888 | 10,770 | 54.01% | 8,720 | 43.73% | 449 | 2.25% |
| 1892 | 11,862 | 52.11% | 10,327 | 45.37% | 575 | 2.53% |
| 1896 | 16,897 | 73.47% | 4,990 | 21.70% | 1,113 | 4.84% |
| 1900 | 15,144 | 62.33% | 7,922 | 32.60% | 1,232 | 5.07% |
| 1904 | 16,104 | 62.15% | 8,372 | 32.31% | 1,434 | 5.53% |
| 1908 | 18,225 | 64.87% | 7,682 | 27.34% | 2,187 | 7.78% |
| 1912 | 9,650 | 32.79% | 9,244 | 31.41% | 10,537 | 35.80% |
| 1916 | 19,284 | 58.71% | 12,702 | 38.67% | 858 | 2.61% |
| 1920 | 51,826 | 74.69% | 15,720 | 22.66% | 1,839 | 2.65% |
| 1924 | 57,948 | 71.10% | 15,041 | 18.45% | 8,516 | 10.45% |
| 1928 | 73,530 | 60.73% | 47,057 | 38.87% | 489 | 0.40% |
| 1932 | 75,232 | 59.17% | 49,121 | 38.63% | 2,793 | 2.20% |
| 1936 | 82,545 | 55.44% | 57,770 | 38.80% | 8,575 | 5.76% |
| 1940 | 97,525 | 58.74% | 67,654 | 40.75% | 838 | 0.50% |
| 1944 | 97,490 | 58.21% | 69,606 | 41.56% | 383 | 0.23% |
| 1948 | 100,280 | 56.74% | 72,327 | 40.92% | 4,130 | 2.34% |
| 1952 | 140,409 | 65.20% | 74,321 | 34.51% | 631 | 0.29% |
| 1956 | 152,747 | 66.41% | 76,656 | 33.33% | 593 | 0.26% |
| 1960 | 121,744 | 47.24% | 135,474 | 52.57% | 503 | 0.20% |
| 1964 | 68,612 | 26.80% | 186,488 | 72.84% | 912 | 0.36% |
| 1968 | 95,858 | 36.01% | 160,513 | 60.30% | 9,835 | 3.69% |
| 1972 | 134,459 | 46.89% | 150,732 | 52.57% | 1,558 | 0.54% |
| 1976 | 136,628 | 45.15% | 155,342 | 51.33% | 10,646 | 3.52% |
| 1980 | 136,184 | 44.84% | 117,274 | 38.61% | 50,271 | 16.55% |
| 1984 | 160,313 | 53.56% | 138,222 | 46.18% | 784 | 0.26% |
| 1988 | 150,306 | 47.71% | 160,289 | 50.88% | 4,461 | 1.42% |
| 1992 | 103,255 | 31.84% | 150,488 | 46.41% | 70,521 | 21.75% |
| 1996 | 92,982 | 30.95% | 180,504 | 60.07% | 26,985 | 8.98% |
| 2000 | 107,033 | 33.75% | 188,450 | 59.41% | 21,694 | 6.84% |
| 2004 | 127,763 | 38.58% | 199,392 | 60.21% | 3,982 | 1.20% |
| 2008 | 136,841 | 39.67% | 200,675 | 58.18% | 7,400 | 2.15% |
| 2012 | 148,393 | 41.62% | 202,714 | 56.86% | 5,416 | 1.52% |
| 2016 | 119,723 | 32.56% | 221,819 | 60.33% | 26,153 | 7.11% |
| 2020 | 125,294 | 30.73% | 273,312 | 67.03% | 9,145 | 2.24% |
| 2024 | 132,497 | 34.29% | 242,712 | 62.81% | 11,238 | 2.91% |

Gubernatorial elections results

Gubernatorial elections results
| Year | Republican | Democratic | Third parties |
|---|---|---|---|
| 2022 | 33.90% 96,607 | 64.49% 183,795 | 1.61% 4,583 |
| 2018 | 69.07% 209,318 | 30.59% 92,709 | 0.34% 1,018 |
| 2014 | 52.97% 133,328 | 42.86% 107,891 | 4.17% 10,503 |
| 2010 | 44.20% 119,850 | 44.19% 119,806 | 11.61% 31,489 |
| 2006 | 38.60% 99,995 | 52.08% 134,916 | 9.32% 24,139 |
| 2002 | 53.45% 140,440 | 41.94% 110,198 | 4.61% 12,098 |
| 1998 | 52.11% 120,729 | 46.18% 106,999 | 1.71% 3,958 |
| 1994 | 71.57% 187,155 | 27.72% 72,479 | 0.72% 1,877 |
| 1990 | 51.80% 149,521 | 45.78% 132,141 | 2.43% 7,012 |

== Communities ==
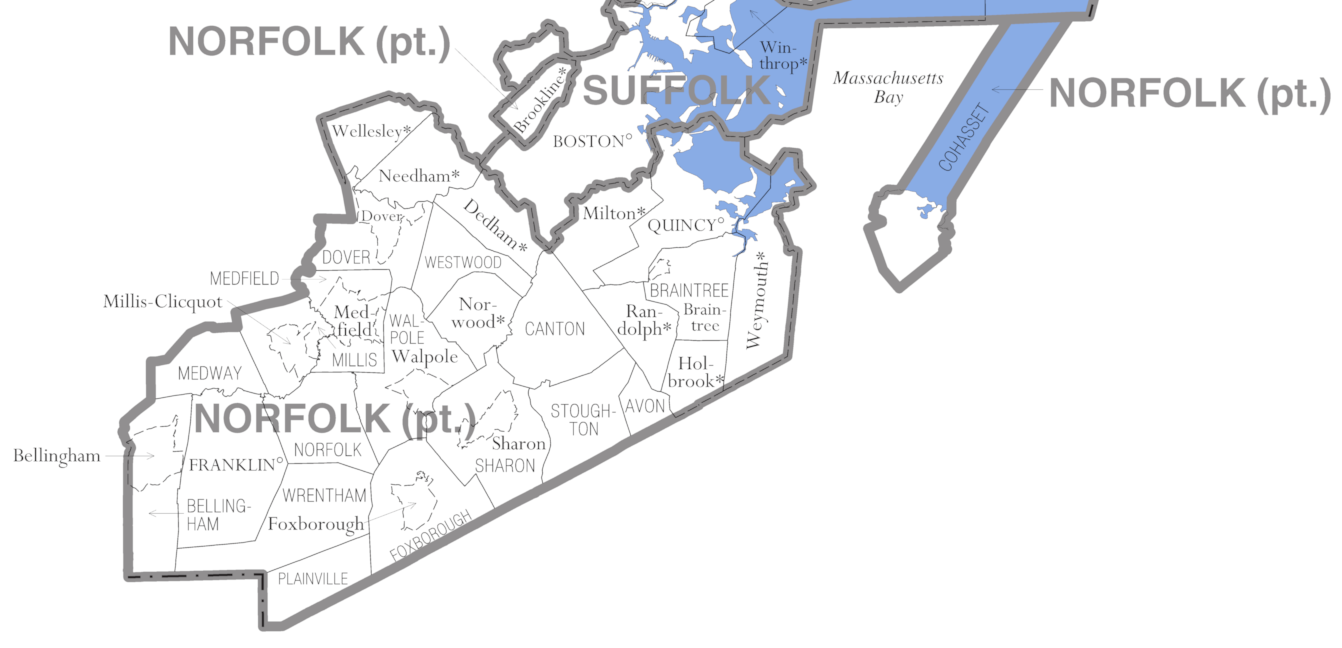
Map of Norfolk County, showing cities, towns, census-designated areas, and ocean areas

=== Cities ===
- Braintree
- Franklin
- Quincy (largest city)
- Randolph
- Weymouth

=== Towns ===
- Avon
- Bellingham
- Brookline
- Canton
- Cohasset
- Dedham (traditional county seat)
- Dover
- Foxborough
- Holbrook
- Medfield
- Medway
- Millis
- Milton
- Needham
- Norfolk
- Norwood
- Plainville
- Sharon
- Stoughton
- Walpole
- Wellesley
- Westwood
- Wrentham

Note: West Roxbury (annexed to Boston 1874), Roxbury (annexed to Boston 1868), Dorchester (founded 1630, annexed to Boston 1870), Hyde Park (incorporated 1868 from Dorchester, Milton, and Dedham, annexed to Boston 1912), and Hingham and Hull were originally part of Norfolk County when the county was incorporated in 1793. As of August 2012, Hingham's Precinct 2 will be part of the Fourth Norfolk District.

=== Census-designated places ===
- Bellingham
- Dover
- Foxborough
- Medfield
- Millis-Clicquot
- Sharon
- Walpole

== Education ==
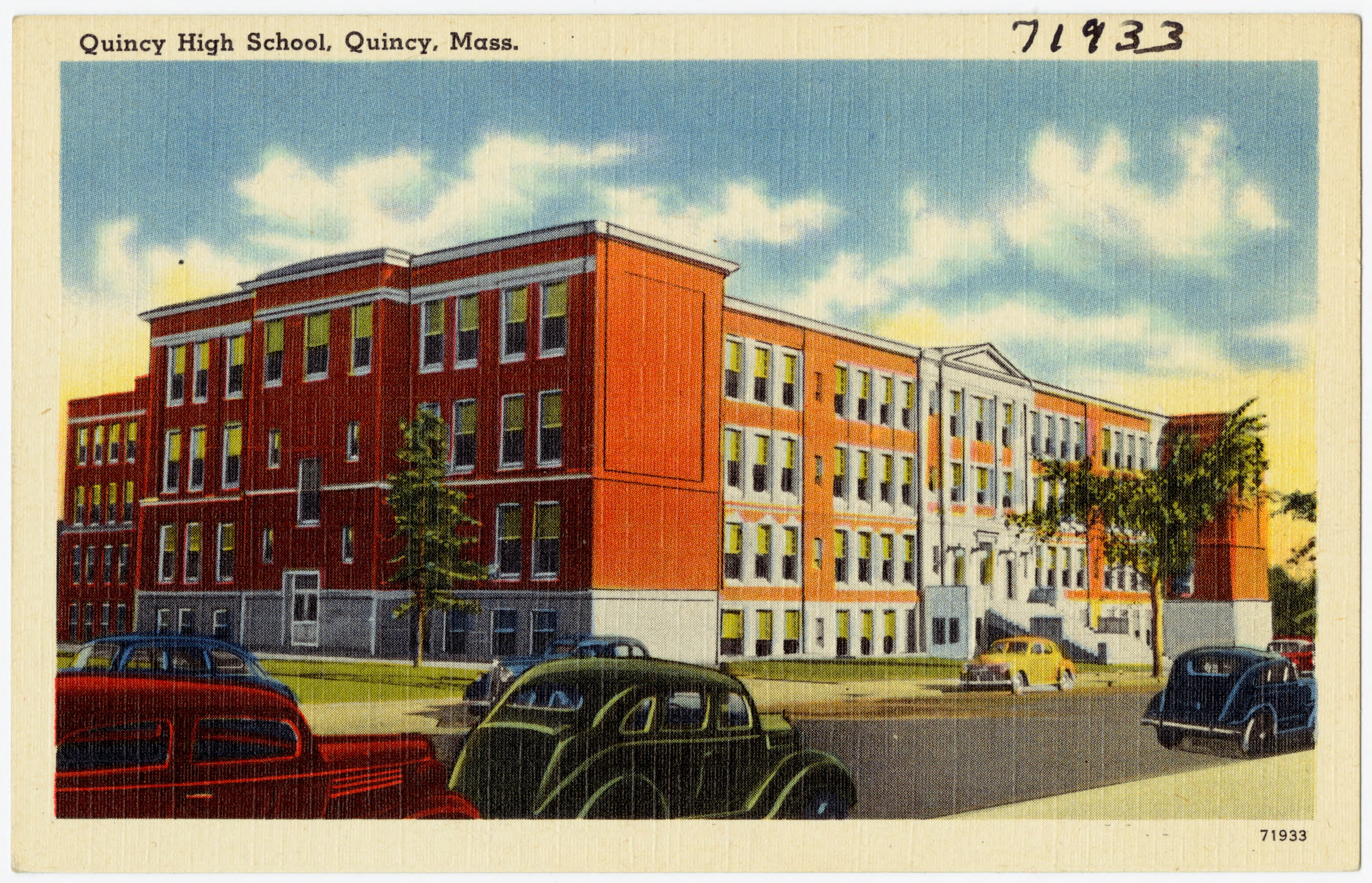
Postcard of Quincy High School, circa 1930s

School districts include:

K-12:

- Avon School District
- Bellingham School District
- Braintree School District
- Brookline School District
- Canton School District
- Cohasset School District
- Dedham School District
- Foxborough School District
- Franklin School District
- Holbrook School District
- Medfield School District
- Medway School District
- Millis School District
- Milton School District
- Needham School District
- Norwood School District
- Quincy School District
- Randolph School District
- Sharon School District
- Stoughton School District
- Walpole School District
- Wellesley School District
- Westwood School District
- Weymouth School District

Secondary:

- Dover-Sherborn School District
- King Philip School District

Elementary:

- Dover School District
- Norfolk School District
- Plainville School District
- Wrentham School District

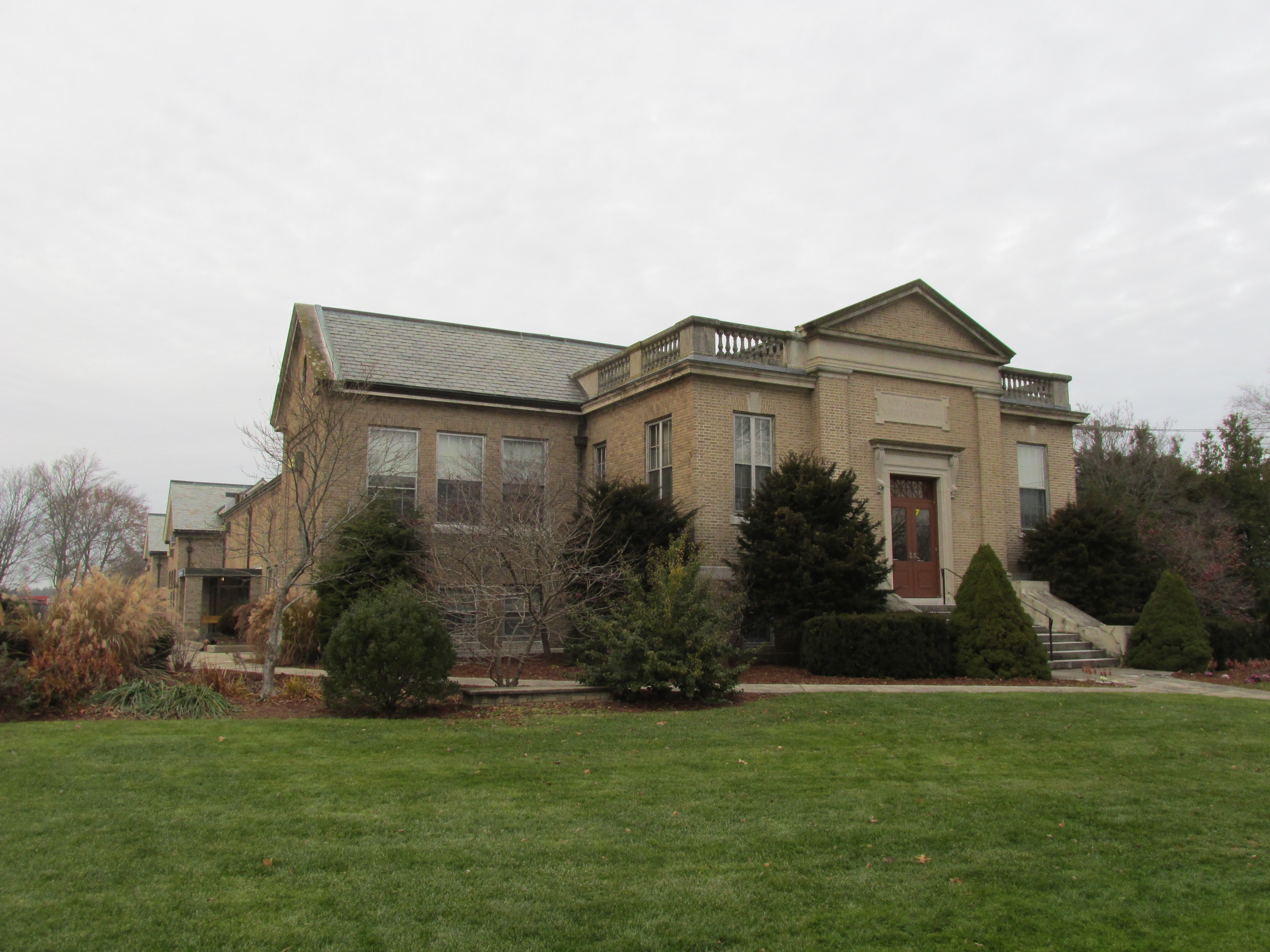
Norfolk County Agricultural High School, in Walpole, seen in 2012

Regional vocational High Schools:

- Blue Hills Regional Technical
- Norfolk County Agricultural
- Tri-County Regional Vocational Technical

== See also ==
- List of Massachusetts locations by per capita income
- Norfolk County Registry of Deeds
- National Register of Historic Places listings in Norfolk County, Massachusetts

== Works cited ==
- Clarke, Wm. Horatio (1903). Mid-Century Memories of Dedham. Dedham Historical Society.
- Cook, Louis Atwood (1918). History of Norfolk County, Massachusetts, 1622-1918. S.J. Clarke publishing Company.
- Dedham Historical Society (2001). Dedham. Arcadia Publishing. ISBN 978-0-7385-0944-0.
- Hanson, Robert Brand (1976). Dedham, Massachusetts, 1635-1890. Dedham Historical Society.
- Parr, James L. (October 1, 2009). Dedham: Historic and Heroic Tales from Shiretown. Arcadia Publishing Incorporated. ISBN 978-1-62584-277-0.

== Bibliography ==
- History of Norfolk County, Massachusetts With Biographical Sketches of Many of Its Pioneers and Prominent Men, by Duane Hamilton Hurd. Published by J.W. Lewis & Co., 1884. 1001 pages.
- History of Norfolk County, Massachusetts, 1622-1918 by Louis Atwood Cook. Published by The S.J. Clarke publishing company, 1918. Volume 1.
