= History of Dedham, Massachusetts, 1900–1999 =

The history of Dedham, Massachusetts in the 20th century saw great growth come to the town. It played host to the Sacco and Vanzetti trial, saw the Endicott Estate and a number of schools constructed, a great deal of economic development, and growth in the number of services provided by the Town.

== Government ==
A bill establishing a representative town meeting was established in 1928, and then amended in 1948. It was almost amended again when a resident used a friendly representative in a neighboring community to introduce and pass a bill in the General Court. A charter was adopted later in the century, and amended again in the 21st century. The Department of Public Works was created in 1933.

There was a great many immigrants in East Dedham during the early part of the century, mostly working in or around the mills along Mother Book. This contributed to a sense of "otherness", and, as late as 1909, the Town Report referred to those residents as "foreigners."

=== Fire department ===
The first fire chief was appointed in 1920. Prior to that there was a four-member Board of Fire Engineers who had charge over fires. Hurricane Carol knocked down the East Dedham firehouse's 80 foot bell tower on August 31, 1954. It flew across the station and landed on 219 Bussey St, the house next door, where Maria Guerriero was feeding her one-year-old son, Joseph. It also crushed three cars parked on Bussey St.

A firehouse was constructed on Westfield Street, near High Street, in 1906. The lower level had horse stalls, a stable room, a hose wago, and engine room, and an opening to the paddock in the rear. The second story had a sleeping room, a company room, a lavatory, a bath, and a hay and grain room. The building housed horse drawn steamer engines. It went out of service sometime in the 20th century, but still exists as a private residence.

Firefighters began wearing uniforms in 1906.

=== Police department ===
After the department purchased its first police motorcycle in 1923, Abe Rafferty was appointed the first motorcycle officer. By 1936, there were 18 officers.

In December 1973, the Dedham Police Department investigated the sighting of several unidentified flying objects over town. A young couple on a date had their car followed by UFO while they drove through Dedham.

==== Headquarters ====
The department was located on the first floor of Memorial Hall until Town Clerk John Carey locked the doors for the last time on March 16, 1962. The building was demolished in April 1962 after a new town hall was built on Bryant St. The police took up temporary residence in the new town hall for a year while a new police station was built on the Memorial Hall property.

On April 29, 1963, the Police Department moved into their new headquarters on the corner of High and Washington Streets. (Note: A new public safety building for both the police and fire departments was opened on March 12, 2023.) It included a fallout shelter in the cellar that featured walls of 6-inch reinforced concrete and a lead window cover that could be put in place to shield occupants from fallout resulting from a nuclear explosion. It also housed the Civil Defense Communication Center.

=== Recreation ===
In the early 1900s, the ancient Indian burial ground near Wigwam Pond was leveled to make way for athletic fields and a commercial shopping area. The last person known to have been buried there was Sarah David, the wife of Alexander Quapish.

The Recreation Department was begun in the 1930s with an effort to build and staff three playgrounds around town. By the 1960s there were 10 playgrounds. The first Recreation Commission was elected in 1941.

In 1951, the Town of Dedham purchased a three acre plot from the Paul estate for $2,625 and built Paul Park on it. (Note: A plaque was placed on a boulder recognizing the Paul family, but has been missing since at least 2011.) Several hundred people attended the dedication ceremony on June 8, 1952.

The Commonwealth took much of the Town Forest in the 1950s to construct Massachusetts Route 128. The state returned 71 acres in the median to the Town in 1972 for use of hikers and picnickers.

Swimming, fishing, boating, and ice skating were popular activities on Mother Brook. In 1925, the Town built a bathhouse on what is today Incinerator Road to replace the 1898 bathhouse that burned down in 1923. It was set aside for women and girls to use on Tuesday and Friday afternoons.

After Proposition 2½ led to the elimination of the Recreation Director position in 1980, Anthony "JuJu" Muccaccio took over the position for a year pro bono. He was then hired full time and began running the parade, an activity he continued even after his retirement in 2010.

=== Youth Commission ===
At a 1971 Town Meeting, a proposal to convert the Endicott Estate's garage into a teen center was voted down. That same year, the Commission moved into the Knights of Columbus Building in Dedham Square. The Commission was only supposed to use the two rented rooms as office space, but youths congregated there anyway, causing problems for the other tenants in the building. As a result, the Commission was evicted as of January 1, 1975.

=== Baby Cemetery ===
Land purchased in the late 1940s by Joseph Stivaletta, a local developer, was once home to the Temporary Asylum for Discharged Female Prisoners. (Note: Stivaletta is the father of Arthur Stivaletta.) He discovered 11 small, oval stones made of marble marking the graves of children and, rather than disturb them, set the land aside and did not build a home on it. When Massachusetts Route 128 was being constructed, Stivaletta convinced then-Transportation Secretary John Volpe to move the road rather than disturb the graves. Volpe's family came from the same small town in Italy as Stivaletta.

Town Meeting voted to accept the cemetery in 1998 after being gifted the land from the Stivaletta family.

=== Town Forest ===
In 1927, Dedham established a Town Forest to the west of Federal Hill, near the Westwood border. In the 1950s, the Commonwealth took the land to construct Massachusetts Route 128. The forest was very rocky, however, so it was decided to build the highway around the forest rather than blast through the rock, in essence making the forest the median strip of the highway. The state gave the 77 acre forest back to the town in 1973.

=== 20th-century representation in the General Court ===
Dedham was represented by a number of women and men in the Great and General Court of Massachusetts.

Year	Representative	Senator	Notes
1900	Arthur Clark		
1905	Joseph Soliday		
1906	Joseph Soliday		
1907	Joseph Soliday	William Otis Faxon	
1908	Joseph Soliday	William Otis Faxon	
1909	Joseph Soliday		
1910	Joseph Soliday / William G. Moseley	Bradley M. Rockwood	
1911	William G. Moseley	Bradley M. Rockwood	
1916	John A. Hirsch		
1925	John K. Burgess	Samuel H. Wragg	
1926	John K. Burgess	Samuel H. Wragg	
1927	John K. Burgess	Samuel H. Wragg	
1928	John K. Burgess	Samuel H. Wragg	
1929	John K. Burgess	Samuel H. Wragg	
1930	John K. Burgess	Samuel H. Wragg	
1931	John K. Burgess	Samuel H. Wragg	
1932	John K. Burgess	Samuel H. Wragg	
1933	James M. McCracken	Samuel H. Wragg	
1934	James M. McCracken	Samuel H. Wragg	
1935	Mason Sears	Samuel H. Wragg	
1936	Mason Sears	Samuel H. Wragg	
1937	Mason Sears	Samuel H. Wragg	
1938	Mason Sears	Samuel H. Wragg	
1939		Mason Sears	
1940		Mason Sears	
1941		Mason Sears	
1942		Mason Sears	
1947	Francis Appleton Harding	Mason Sears	
1948	Francis Appleton Harding	Mason Sears	
1949	Francis Appleton Harding		
1950	Francis Appleton Harding		
1951	Francis Appleton Harding		
1952	Francis Appleton Harding		
1953	Francis Appleton Harding		
1954	Francis Appleton Harding		
1955	Francis Appleton Harding		
1956	Harold Rosen		
1957	Harold Rosen		
1958	Harold Rosen		
1959	Harold Rosen		
1960	Harold Rosen		
1961	Harold Rosen		
1962	Harold Rosen		
1963	Harold Rosen		
1964	Harold Rosen		
1965	Harold Rosen		
1966	Harold Rosen		
1967	Harold Rosen		
1968	Harold Rosen		
1969	Harold Rosen / Charles M. McGowan		
1970	Charles M. McGowan	Robert L. Crawley	
1971	Charles M. McGowan	Robert L. Crawley	
1972	Charles M. McGowan	Arthur Joseph Lewis Jr.	
1973	Charles M. McGowan	Arthur Joseph Lewis Jr.	
1974	Charles M. McGowan	Arthur Joseph Lewis Jr.	
1975	Charles M. McGowan	Arthur Joseph Lewis Jr.	
1976	Charles M. McGowan	Arthur Joseph Lewis Jr.	
1977	Charles M. McGowan	Arthur Joseph Lewis Jr.	
1978	Charles M. McGowan	Arthur Joseph Lewis Jr.	
1979	Charles M. McGowan / Deborah R. Cochran	Arthur Joseph Lewis Jr.	
1980	Deborah R. Cochran	Arthur Joseph Lewis Jr.	
1981	Deborah R. Cochran	Arthur Joseph Lewis Jr.	
1982	Marie-Louise Kehoe	Arthur Joseph Lewis Jr.	
1983	Marie-Louise Kehoe	Arthur Joseph Lewis Jr.	
1984	Marie-Louise Kehoe	Arthur Joseph Lewis Jr.	
1985	Marie-Louise Kehoe	Arthur Joseph Lewis Jr.	
1986	Marie-Louise Kehoe	Arthur Joseph Lewis Jr.	
1987	Marie-Louise Kehoe	Arthur Joseph Lewis Jr.	
1988	Marie-Louise Kehoe	Arthur Joseph Lewis Jr.	
1989	Marie-Louise Kehoe	Arthur Joseph Lewis Jr.	
1990	Marie-Louise Kehoe	Arthur Joseph Lewis Jr.	
1991	Marie-Louise Kehoe	Christopher M. Lane	
1992	Marie-Louise Kehoe	Christopher M. Lane	
1993	Marie-Louise Kehoe	Marian Walsh	
1994	Marie-Louise Kehoe	Marian Walsh	
1995	Maryanne Lewis	Marian Walsh	
1996	Maryanne Lewis	Marian Walsh	
1997	Maryanne Lewis	Marian Walsh	
1998	Maryanne Lewis	Marian Walsh	
1999	Maryanne Lewis	Marian Walsh	

== Public schools ==
=== Quincy School ===
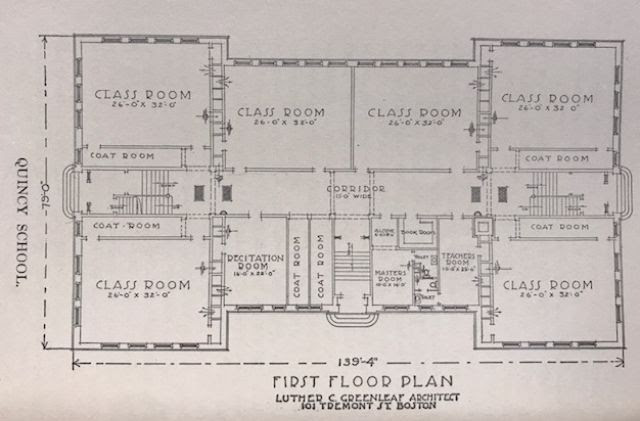
Floor plan of the Quincy School

In April 1909, Town Meeting voted to appropriate $60,000 to build a new Quincy School and $6,000 for furnishings, fittings, and grading. The original school, it was said at the time was "only held together by the last coat of paint [and had] clearly outlived its usefulness."

The new school was completed on budget and built at the intersection of Greenhood, Quincy, and Bussey Streets. It was dedicated on June 4, 1910. Within the two-story building were ten rooms. It measured 79' by 140' and was made of brick with sandstone trimming. The interior was outfitted with hard pine.

That the new school was built, opined the Dedham Transcript, was due to "the good influence of [the German Quincy Homestead Association] in building up this thrifty village [which] cannot be understated; and the growth and early success of this school were largely due to the efforts of its members."

The new school was used until 1982 when declining enrollment and Proposition 2½ forced its closure. Town Meeting authorized the sale of the property to a developer in 1982, but only after off-duty police officers and firefighters were able to find and bring enough Town Representatives to reach a quorum.

=== Dedham High School ===
==== Buildings ====
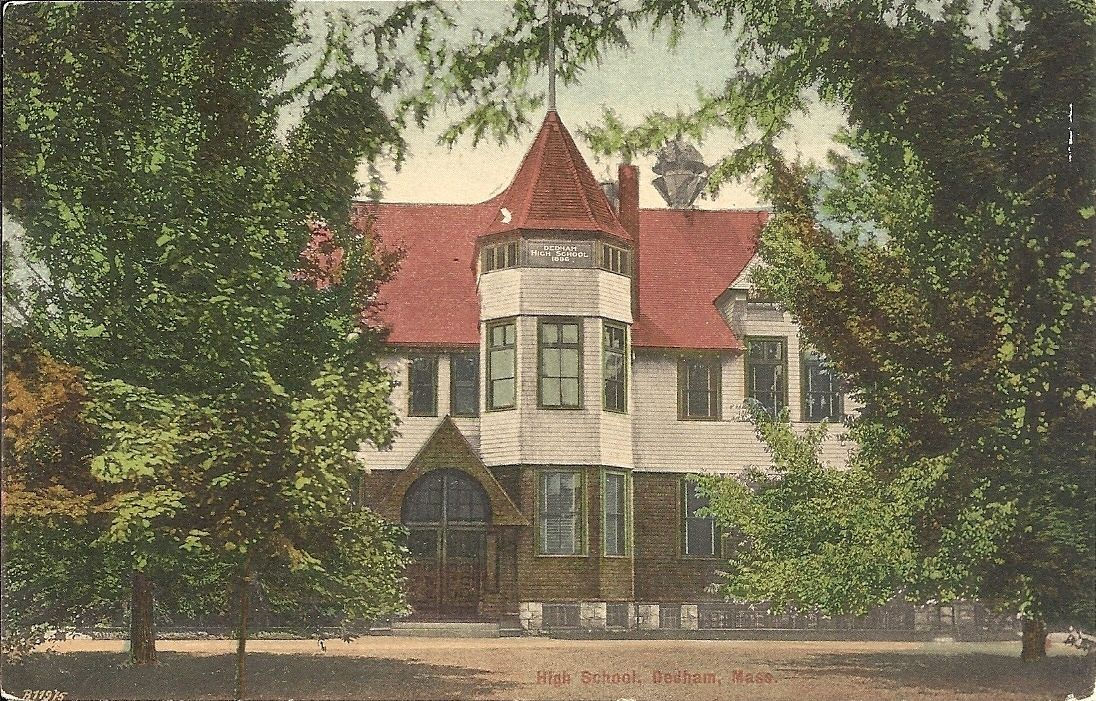
A postcard of the building that housed Dedham High School from 1886 to 1915 on Bryant Street

From 1916 to 1959 the high school was located at 70 Whiting Avenue, today the site of Loewen Field. Governor Calvin Coolidge took part in the dedication ceremony. In 1932, a new wing was added at a cost of $200,000. Later, this wing was used as the Oakdale Junior High School.

Special laws were passed by the Massachusetts General Court in 1957 allowing the town to use Stone Park across the street to build a new high school. Classes began at 140 Whiting Avenue in 1959, and continue to the present. The building cost $2 million to construct, but even before the building opened town officials knew that it would be too small to house all of the students of the post-war baby boom.

An addition to this building was constructed in 1967, which consisted of a new academic wing with 28 new classrooms and an additional gymnasium. Plans also included the construction of a new athletic practice field and tennis courts along High Street. (Note: The Mucciaccio Pool would also be built in this location in 1975.) Land was taken by eminent domain for the expansion, including the mansion once owned by R.O. Storrs.

In 1976 a new library, a larger cafeteria, modern science laboratories, swimming pool, and more classrooms were added. The old cafeteria was converted into an auto body shop, and is currently the home of the town's Facilities Department. The library was renovated and expanded in 1999.

==== Sports ====
Dedham High School began playing Norwood High School in an annual football contest in 1920. Over the years, there have been several notable incidents. In 1946, thousands of fans swarmed the field for about 20 minutes after a Norwood touchdown pass was brought back on an offensive interference penalty. During the closing minutes of the game, the crowd threw stones and other objects at the officials. The Dedham Police Department had to escort them off the field after the game.

In 1956, seven boys from Norwood High School threw bottles of blue and white paint, the school colors, through the windows of Dedham's School Department administration building to celebrate their team's win the day before. While they admitted to the paint, they denied being involved with the smashing of 22 windows at Dedham High School on Thanksgiving Day.

== Crime and trials ==
=== Sacco and Vanzetti ===
The historic Sacco and Vanzetti trial was held in the Norfolk County Courthouse in 1921 under heavy police guard. The two were Italian-born American anarchists, who were arrested, tried, and executed for the killings of Frederick Parmenter, a shoe factory paymaster, and Alessandro Berardelli, a security guard, and for the robbery of $15,766.51 from the factory's payroll on April 15, 1920. Many believe that they "were the innocent victims of political and economic interests determined to send a message about the rising tide of anarchist violence."

The trial opened on May 31, 1921, with heavy security. Police were stationed at every entrance of the courthouse and all those entering were searched for weapons. The State Constabulary patrolled outside on horseback and motorcycles and the courtroom was retrofitted with bomb shutters and sliding steel doors that could seal off that wing of the courthouse in case of an attack. The cast iron shutters on the windows were designed and painted to match the wooden ones on the rest of the building. The courtroom was so protected that "the trial would be conducted in a far more formidable cage than the simple prisoner's cage that surrounded Sacco and Vanzetti during their trial." The "cage" in which the defendants sat was "more like a fancy Ferris wheel car" than a cage designed to hold prisoners. It has a tall back, an open front, and no top.

During the trial, Supreme Court Justice Louis Brandeis, who was then in Washington, invited Sacco's wife to stay at his home near the courthouse. Sacco's seven-year-old son, Dante, would sometimes stand on the sidewalk outside the jail and play catch with his father by throwing a ball over the wall.

Brandeis was not the only member of the nation's highest court to be involved with the case. Felix Frankfurter, then a law professor at Harvard, "did more than any individual to rally "respectable" opinion behind the two men, saw the case as a test of the rule of law itself." At one point, the trial moved outdoors, to Norfolk Street behind the courthouse, so the getaway car could be viewed. Testimony was also offered outdoors.

The 12 jurors were sequestered at the courthouse for the entirety of the six-week trial. They slept on cots in the courthouse's gran jury room and bathed in the basement of the jail. To celebrate the 4th of July, they were brought to Scituate, Massachusetts and given a lobster dinner.

To get a full jury, courthouse officials had to go to extraordinary lengths. Over 600 men were interviewed, with the most common reason for dismissal being their opposition to the death penalty. One man, a sugar dealer, tried to pretend that he was deaf in an attempt to get out of serving on the jury. When he was discovered, by answering a question posed by the judge, Sacco and Vanzetti were sent into fits of laughter.

After 500 potential jurors were interviewed, but only seven selected, deputies from the Norfolk County Sheriff's office went out to workplaces, club meetings, concerts, and elsewhere to bring in additional potential jurors. One man, ultimately selected, was brought from his wedding dinner. The Quincy man had to postpone his honeymoon until after the trial.

At one point the prosecution presented a cap that was found at the crime scene and which they contended to be Sacco's. When Sacco's lawyers had him try the cap on, however, it was found to be much too small for his head.

Several years later, in May 1926, Frankfurter would travel to the Dedham courthouse to make a motion for a new trial after another man, also in the Dedham Jail, confessed to the crime. The motion was denied by Judge Webster Thayer in October and in the next 10 months the Supreme Judicial Court, a federal judge and three Supreme Court Justices, including Brandeis, each denied motions for either a new trial or a stay of execution.

On August 23, 1927, the two were electrocuted in the Charlestown jail. The "executions sent hundreds of thousands of protesters into the streets of six continents." The American embassy in Paris was surrounded by tanks to fend off rioting mobs and demonstrations in Germany ended with six deaths. In Geneva "over 5,000 protesters destroyed all things American: cars, goods, even theaters showing American films." Frankfurter would write a scathing critique of the case entitled "The Case of Sacco-Vanzetti: a critical analysis for lawyers and laymen." It would first be published in The Atlantic Monthly and then as a hardcover book.

=== Millen/Faber trial ===
The brothers Millen, Irving and Murton, alighted from the Yankee Clipper at Readville station on April 14, 1934, to a crowd of thousands booing and hissing them. A caravan of 40 cars took them from the station to the Dedham jail. When they stopped at the corner of High and Washington streets to ask traffic Officer John Keegan for directions to the jail, Keegan jumped on the running board of the lead car to direct them personally.

The pair, along with Abraham Faber, had robbed a bank in Needham and killed several police officers, including Francis Oliver Haddock and Forbes McLeod. After the robbery and murder, a Dedham selectman recommended that the Dedham Police Department buy a submachine gun.

The trial attracted national attention, and crowds of hundreds, including schoolchildren, waited outside the Norfolk County Courthouse each morning. Several times, people mistakenly walked into the Dedham Historical Society, thinking it was either the jail or the courthouse. When Roscoe Ates tried to get in, courthouse personnel served him with a fake arrest warrant demanding that he appear at the courthouse. The crime was the inspiration for the 1939 film Let Us Live.

=== Bettina Masserelli ===
In 1928, 28-year-old Bettina Masserelli of Dedham robbed a store in Everett, Massachusetts with a male accomplice. When the clerk asked the pair not to take his "bread money," Masserelli told her friend to "sock him." The clerk suffered four broken teeth in the incident and was locked in a coal closet where he was told he was lucky to still be alive.

At the trial, the clerk was able to identify Masserelli, a singer, by her "marked attractiveness" and her "sweet voice." She was found guilty and sentenced to 15 years in the women's prison in Framingham. She was the first woman convicted of armed robbery in Massachusetts.

While in prison, Masserelli climbed down a rope made of bedsheets and escaped. A few weeks later, she was spotted in a car in Dedham again and the Dedham Police Department began a wild car chase through the streets of town. During the chase, she leapt from the moving car and fled on foot. Police eventually found her hiding behind a stone wall.

=== Other ===
In 1926, the Dedham Police Department raided a Chinese laundry and confiscated $100,000 worth of opium.

== Endicott Estate ==
In 1904, the East Street home of Henry Bradford Endicott, the founder of the multimillion-dollar Endicott-Johnson Shoe Company, burned to the ground. The fire department was not able to get to the estate in time as they were dealing with three other fires simultaneously, including one at the fire house. Endicott cleared the ashes away and built a new homestead on the 15-acre (61,000 m^{2}) parcel. The three-story building he constructed has nine bathrooms, eight bedrooms, a library, a music room, a ballroom, a mirrored parlor, a butler's kitchen, a linen room, and servants' quarters.

When he died in 1920, he left the building to his stepdaughter, Katherine. She died in 1967 without any children and willed the land and the estate to the town for "education, civic, social and recreational purposes."

At the time "town didn't know quite what to do with it" and the "Town Meeting voted to offer it to the Commonwealth." Governor John Volpe took the title to the 25 room estate in a ceremony on December 7, 1967, and intended to use it as a governor's mansion. It soon became apparent that it would be cheaper to build a brand new mansion than to remodel the estate to Volpe's wife's "lavish taste" and "crazy notions" than to renovate the Endicott Estate and in 1969 the Commonwealth gave the estate back to the Town.

=== Endicott branch library ===
In 1971, the Finance Committee's recommendation to Town Meeting was to appropriate $61,000 to convert the nine car garage into a library. They also recommended that Town Meeting not adopt a competing article from the Youth Commission that would have turned the garage into a youth center at a cost of $16,000. The Finance Committee did recommend, however, that the Recreation Department open a teen center and that a director be hired for it. The Finance Committee argued that it was a prudent move to consolidate the other branches, and that a library would serve all age groups within the town. Neighbors of the Estate also objected to a teen center, but supported a library.

Town Meeting debated the competing proposals for more than three hours, and ultimately rejected both. Though they had initially supported it, at Town Meeting the Finance Committee changed their recommendation from supporting the proposal to recommending indefinite postponement. As a result, the garage continued to be used for storage.

At the 1972 Annual Town Meeting, the Library Trustees made a new pitch for two of the Estate's 26 acres, including the garage. This time, the Town Meeting appropriated $68,000 to convert the garage to a branch library.

== Fairbanks House ==
The 20th century saw a number of near disasters come to the Fairbanks House, the oldest wooden house in the United States.

On August 18, 1964, a 17-year-old Dedhamite who lived down the street was driving and missed a left hand turn from Whiting Avenue onto East Street. It was raining, and the pavement was wet. His car ended up in the east wing of the house, with the rear bumper flush with the wall. The 1957 sedan remained in the house overnight until it could be removed the next day. The accident prompted a stone wall to be erected which prevented another car from hitting the house in 1973.

A group of arsonists tried to burn the house down on July 4, 1967. Powderpost beetles were exterminated from the house in the 1970s.

== Private schools ==
In 1922, the Noble and Greenough School moved from Boston to Dedham. They purchased the Nickerson Castle and turned the estate into a 187-acre (0.8 km^{2}) campus in Riverdale along the Charles River. In 1957, Ursuline Academy moved from Boston's Back Bay to a 28-acre (110,000 m^{2}) parcel in Upper Dedham. The Ursuline nuns who ran the school purchased the property which included a grand manor house designed by Boston architect Guy Lowell. The house, described as "one of the grandest of grand mansions west of Boston, and comparable to what one would see in Newport," was built by Francis Skinner for his new wife Sarah Carr, in 1906. Today, the mansion once known as the Federal Hill Farm has "the richest and most elaborate residential rooms in Dedham" and serves as a convent for the sisters who run the school.

== Churches ==
In 1907, the Methodist congregation built a new church in Oakdale Square at the corner of Oakdale Avenue and Fairview Streets. St. Luke's Lutheran Church expanded their chapel in West Roxbury in 1917 before building a new church at 950 East Street, on the site of the former Endicott School, in 1960.

The Riverdale Congregational Church grew out of a Sunday School class held in William Lent's boathouse. Mr. and Mrs. Henry Bingham donated money and land to build the church, which was completed in 1914 and expanded in the 1960s. When the church closed, the church donated their remaining funds in 1992 to be used as a scholarship for a member of the graduating class of Dedham High School who attended the Riverdale School. As of 2001, the building was used by the Calvary Baptist Church.

The Christian Science congregation first held services in the Odd Fellows Hall in 1920 and in 1930 moved to the Masonic Hall. In 1932, they bought Nathaniel Ames' house, moved it to the back of the lot, and built a new church. The cornerstone for the church was laid in December 1938 and a steeple was added after 1940. The first service was held on March 3, 1940.

By the 1930s, St. Mary's was one of the largest parishes in the Archdiocese with over 6,000 parishioners and 1,300 students in Sunday School. During the middle of that decade there were four priests and six nuns ministering to the congregation. In the 1950s, it became clear that a second parish was needed in Dedham, and so St. Susanna's Church was established in 1960 to serve the needs of the Riverdale neighborhood. When St. Susanna's opened it had 300 families, while 2,500 stayed at St. Mary's. Before the first mass was said in the new church on February 11, 1962, services were held at Moseley's on the Charles.

=== Fellowship Bible Church ===
Baptists began holding meetings in East Dedham in 1822. The East Dedham Baptist Church was founded in 1843 and was renamed the First Baptist Church in 1919. (Note: Ernest Francis Packard, the pastor's son, was paymaster of the Cochrane Mill across the street in 1911.) In 1994, Roslindale's Grace Baptist Church merged with the Dedham church, and the new congregation became known as Fellowship Bible Church.

In 1843, they built a small church near Maverick Street. In 1852, a new wooden church was constructed on Milton Street on the corner of Myrtle Street. Canton's Jonathan Mann commissioned a new bell, weighing 2,000 pounds, to be cast by the William Blake Company of Boston and presented it to the church on February 20, 1882. In 1911, a belfry was added to the church and the bell was placed in it. (Note: Parr and the Historical Society differ in the year the belfry was added. Parr says 1910, while the Society says 1911.)

By 1972, the wooden church was in such disrepair that it needed to be torn down. A new church was built on the same site that year.

The John J. Duane Wrecking Company of Quincy demolished the 1852 church in August 1972 and the church offered their bell to the wrecking company in partial payment of the bill. The company sold it to Charlie and Margaret Spohr, and the couple placed it in one of their lush gardens in their Quissett estate. Following the Spohrs deaths, the property was given to a trust which maintains the gardens free of charge for the public. The Church attempted to re-obtain the bell in 2005, but the trust declined to sell it back.

== Economy ==
=== Dedham Square ===
In 1900, the Greenleaf Building was finished on the corner of High and Washington Streets, opposite Memorial Hall. It was designed and built by Luther C. Greenleaf and his architectural firm of Greenleaf and Cobb. The building was home to the waiting rooms and offices for the trolley company, stores, a banquet room, offices, and an apartment for the janitor. It was razed in the 1940s.

The origins of the Peggy Lawton brand of cookies and brownies began in Dedham Square in September 1945. Peggy and Lawton Wolf opened The Sampler, a restaurant on Washington Street, near the intersection with School Street. The demand for Peggy's brownies was so great, however, that they soon thereafter shut down the restaurant and instead focused on baked goods under the brand name Peggy Lawton Kitchens. The facility later moved to East Dedham, and then out of Dedham. (Note: They first moved to Hyde Park and then to Walpole, where it was still operating 2026.)

On March 1, 1967, Ma Riva's Sub Shop opened in Dedham, where Emily and Addie's was in 2018. It eventually would become D'Angelos and then bought out by Papa Gino's. Both are still headquartered on the old Route 1 in Dedham.

In 1903, there were nine blacksmith shops in Dedham. The last one listed in the town directory, Frank P. Kern of Williams Street, appeared in 1941.

In the early 1900s, Frank Geishecker moved the dry goods store his father founded in East Dedham to the center of town. It sold clothing until its close in 1983.

=== Oakdale ===
A six storefront building was built in Oakdale Square at the corner of Oakdale Avenue and Sanderson Avenue in 1925. Neighbors complained, however, that it would create a "blind corner" for motorists, and the building inspector tried to shut the construction down. The builder, John Picone of Newton, sued the Town to resume construction. The case made it to the Massachusetts Supreme Judicial Court where Associate Justice Henry K. Braley ruled in favor of Picone.

The main store in the building would go on to house Danny's Supermarket, Stop & Shop, Tedeschis, and 7-Eleven. 7-Eleven shut down in the fall of 2022. On June 1, 2025, Advanced Oakdale Dental held a grand opening for their new facility in that building, having moved from across the Square on February 14 of that year.

The Rust Craft Greeting Card Company moved to Dedham in 1954. On what was then called Rust Craft Park and today is known as Rustcraft Road, they built what was at the time the largest greeting card factory in the world. A crowd of 10,000 people attended their grand opening ceremony. They were the first company to sell greeting cards with a fitted envelope and introduced cards for Easter, Valentine's Day, St. Patrick's Day, anniversaries, and more. The building has been used for a variety of other purposes since 1980.

=== East Dedham ===
By the early part of the 20th century, East Dedham had become developed as a busy mill village. The neighborhood had schools, churches, and homes, in addition to the commercial district known today as East Dedham Square centered at the intersection of High and Bussey Streets. The textile mills along Mother Brook began closing in the 1910s and 1920s, however, as owners sought cheaper labor and more favorable conditions in the south.

The Old Mill Cafe opened in 1933 and closed in 2010. Many young men had the East Dedham Cross, a Latin cross with the letters ED and rays emanating out of it, tattoed on themselves.

=== East Dedham Square urban redevelopment ===
In the 1950s, a study showed that there were 10,000 cars and 700 pedestrians a day who passed through East Dedham Square. Many of the storefronts were empty, however, as were the cold water flats about them. Much of the area was run down, with absentee landlords who did not maintain their properties.

In 1959, a group of East Dedham residents approached the Planning Board about applying for funding from the Housing Act of 1949 to revitalize the neighborhood. Federal officials toured the area in October 1959, and the issue went to Special Town Meeting on May 15, 1965. The Finance Committee called the plan, which would see the federal government pay 75% of the cost of acquiring the land by eminent domain and razing it, "clearly advantageous." The plan needed 2/3 of the town meeting to approve it, and passed by a single vote.

The chief opponent of the plan was Selectman Chairman Fran O'Brien. He objected to signing paperwork that called the neighborhood he had lived in his entire life "blighted," but eventually did after a referendum showed voters were also in favor.

The plan was eventually scaled back, with only 14 acres being taken instead of 26, and the final result was "a windswept high traffic intersection" instead of "groups of tidy town houses on a campus-like setting on tree-lined streets."

=== Dedham Drive-In ===
On August 11, 1948, the Dedham Drive-In opened on the Providence Pike. The Town Selectmen and business leaders joined Michael Redstone in cutting a ceremonial length of film as hundreds of cars lined up on Elm Street to get in. Fun and Fancy Free and Blondie in the Dough played on opening night. It was the 20th drive-in in Massachusetts.

Permission to build the "open air theater," an exact copy of the drive-in Redstone had operated on Long Island for the previous 10 years, was granted in the fall of 1947. Prior to the construction of the drive-in, the 23 acre parcel was an eyesore. It had housed Farquhar's Nursery at one point, but a "moonscape" was created after it closed and gravel and loam was removed from the site.

Originally, the screen was the 60 feet by 42 feet, but it was enlarged sometime before the fall of 1955. Over time, the theater stopped showing first run films and instead ran B movies.

In 1954, the United Christian Youth Movement held the first of an annual sunrise Easter service at the theater. St. Luke's Lutheran Church took over in 1961, and they continued the tradition until at least 1977.

The drive-in closed in the late 1970s or early 1980s. In 1973, Showcase 1-2-3, a traditional indoor movie theater also owned by Redstone, opened next door. Legacy Place was built on the site in the 20th century, and the Showcase Cinema de Luxe sits on the exact site of the old drive-in.

=== Dedham Mall ===
Ground was broken for the 420,000 sq.ft. Dedham Mall, know then as the Charles River Arcade, on July 1, 1964 by the Pacella Concrete Pipe Corp. While it was originally intended to open in September 1965, it did not actually open until 1967. It was the first enclosed mall in New England. The engineer on the project was J.L. Hayden and the architect was Donald Gillespie. The project director was Richard Wood.

To build the mall, part of Mother Brook was piped underground. It also required reclaiming marshlands near the head of the brook. Runoff from the mall ran into the brook and then the Neponset River, which was unable to handle the extra water during heavy rains. In 1968, when the marshes were being drained, the Metropolitan Park Commission applied for an "Open Spaces Grant" from the federal government.

More than 60 stores were in the mall in September 1986.

=== Dedham Plaza ===
The 30 acre Dedham Plaza opened with state and local dignitaries attending a ribbon cutting ceremony on October 14, 1959. The developer was Peter J. Kanavos. It was the first major shopping center south of Boston. There were 25 stores, included national chains and local merchants, as well as food options. A raffle was held during a 10 day grand opening celebration with more than $15,000 in prizes, including an all expenses paid trip to London and Paris. During the celebration, radio, stage, television, and movie personalities all made appearances. More than 1,500 cars were able to park in the lot surrounding the split level shopping plaza.

== Television and film ==
Dedham has been the setting or filming location of a number of films and television shows:

- In 1920, a film version of Henry Wadsworth Longfellow's poem The Bell of Atri was filmed in Dedham on the Town Common. The screenplay was written by Ethel Howard Lincoln, a Dedhamite. (Note: Lincoln's mother, Doris Howard, was principal of the Avery School for many years.) The hundreds of extras, or "supes," put on their 18th-century attire in Memorial Hall. The extras had a picnic on the Common while the major players ate at the Dedham Inn.

The film was used as part of the Massachusetts Society for the Prevention of Cruelty to Animals' "Be Kind to Our Dumb Animals" campaign. The film was lost in a fire at the MSPCA in 2008.

- In the 1980s, the Endicott Estate was featured in an episode of Spenser: For Hire.
- The 1982 cult classic Pieces was filmed mainly in Madrid, but also included the same Dedham Square bank robbed in Eddie Coyle.

=== Anne of Green Gables ===
William Desmond Taylor's 1919 silent film Anne of Green Gables was filmed in Dedham. After the studio purchased the rights to the book, they sent a scout to New England to find a filming location. He declared Dedham to be the "quaint New England village" they were looking for, but choosing the Fairbanks House as the title home was an odd choice as it did not resemble the Nova Scotian farmhouse that served as the inspiration. (Note: The author of the book, L.M. Montgomery, was displeased with the film as a whole as she thought it was too "New England" and not enough "Prince Edward Island.")

It was the favorite role of star Mary Miles Minter, who starred as Anne Shirley. It was while in Dedham that Minter fell in love with Taylor, who was 30 years older than she was. Taylor and the film crew arrived in Dedham in July and filmed at First Church and Parish in Dedham, St. Paul's Church, the Endicott School, the lawn of the Endicott Estate, the Charles River, the Captain Onion House, and the Dedham Woods. They also filmed in Islington.

In addition to local landmarks, there were 75 locals who were cast as extras, and James Burke's Jersey cow and Arthur Benson's "prize porkers" were also shown. The film also starred Paul Kelly.

A picnic was held at the Fairbanks House for the film crew after production finally ended in August, having been delayed by an unusually rainy summer. Minter spoke at the Fairbanks family reunion where she was presented with a bouquet of American beauty roses. It was released on November 23, 1919. On December 1, the film was shown for the first time in Memorial Hall. There was a second showing later in the week and two more the following week.

It is considered to be a lost film. After Taylor was murdered, and Minter and her mother were named suspects, the studio and many theater owners destroyed their copies of the films. None are known to have survived.

=== The Friends of Eddie Coyle ===
On October 17, 1972, The Friends of Eddie Coyle was shot at the Dedham Plaza, showing W.T. Grant's, Woolworth's, Barbo's Furniture, Liggett's Drugstore, Capitol Supermarket, Friendly's, and Plaza Liquors. A few weeks later, on December 1, the crew shot the film's opening scene in Dedham Square. The South Shore Bank (Note: As of 2023, it is a Citizen's Bank.) was the used as the bank robbed in the film. Local businesses including Geishecker's, P.J.'s Pastry Shop, McLellan's, and Gilbert's Package Store can be seen as the movie's bank manager drives through the Square. Robert Mitchum signed autographs for fans in between takes.

== Technology and modernization ==
=== East Dedham urban renewal project ===
In 1965, Town Meeting voted to declare East Dedham Square "blighted" and undertake an urban renewal project. The measured passed by a single vote more than was needed to reach the two-thirds majority required. The project was scaled back from 26 to 14 acres, but nine residential properties were taken, forcing the relocation of 42 families.

Much of East Dedham Square was raised. In the 1920s, the neighborhood was home to a haberdashery, an undertaker, stables, a grocery story, a bakery, a pharmacy, a dentist, and more. After the project, a strip mall, public housing, a parking lot, and condo development took their place.

=== Telephone history and changes ===
The first transatlantic direct dial telephone call was made by Sally Reed in Dedham, Massachusetts, to her penpal, Ann Morsley, in Dedham, Essex, in 1957. It was witnessed by Reed's teacher, Grace Hine, Dedham's former chief telephone operator of 39 years, Margaret Dooley, Selectman Arthur Lee, and several representatives of New England Telephone and Telegraph Company. The call took place at the Dedham Historical Society and was placed by the president-emeritus of the Society, Dr. Arthur Worthington.

The call was made possible by the New England Telephone and Telegraph Company’s new telephone exchange building at 387 Washington Street. Construction had begun on the building in July 1954 when the previous wooden structure, the 88-year-old J. Everett Smith Market building, was demolished. It was not until late in 1955 when construction on the new building began. The cornerstone was laid on April 4, 1956, with a time capsule placed inside. At the cornerstone laying ceremony were several selectmen, telephone company officials, the town’s postmaster, police chief Walter Carroll, and State Representative Francis Harding. Father William Kennedy of St. Mary’s Church delivered an invocation and Reverend Leland Maxfield of the Westwood Baptist Church offered a benediction.

The new facility enabled Dedham residents, starting at 2:01 am on Sunday, December 1, 1957, to make direct dial calls. Previously, residents asked an operator at a building on Church Street next to the Dedham Public Library to connect lines using the exchange DEdham 3. The new direct dial exchanges were either DAvis 6 or DAvis 9. The telephone company ran ads in the Dedham Transcript to alert customers to the change, and the Avery School PTO hosted a workshop to help explain the new system. While the new systems enabled residents to obtain new phones in colors other than black, it also resulted in the layoffs of 176 operators who worked in the Church Street facility.

As of 2023, the building is mainly a switching center for Verizon FIOS internet, telephone, and television subscribers.

=== Automobiles ===
Around 1900, Dr. Harry K. Shatswell of School Street built and drove a "steam powered horseless carriage" through the streets of town. This was two years after the first automobile went on sale in the United States. That same year, Theodore Burgess purchased three French automobiles for himself and his wife, who is thought to be the first woman to drive in Massachusetts. In 1903, there were 11 cars registered in Dedham.

William Kissam Vanderbilt was pulled over by Dedham Police Department officers Smith, Hatch, and Crocker in August 1906. He was accused of "scorching" through town at a speed of 30 miles per hour. Vanderbilt was driving from Boston to his family vacation home, The Breakers, in Newport, Rhode Island. He claimed he was warned of the speed trap in West Roxbury and thus was only doing 12 miles per hour as he drove through town with his wife and a mechanic. His brother had been pulled over for speeding on the same stretch of road just one week earlier. Vanderbilt said he was going to fight the ticket, and crowds gathered outside the courthouse the following week in hopes of seeing the tycoon and racecar driver. They were disappointed, however, when his attorney arrived instead to pay the $15 fine.

=== Water ===
A wellsweep on the estate of John Dogget, which he had dug about 50 years prior, was replaced in 1904 with a pump. The public was welcome to drop a bucket into the well, which sat on Sandy Valley Road, and drink the water. (Note: The site had been known for its excellent quality of water since 1796, when water was piped from the spring into peoples' homes.)

== Holidays ==
=== Independence Day ===
==== Wagon burnings ====
Beginning in the early 1900s and continuing until the 1990s, bonfires would be held first in Oakdale Square and then in the Manor to celebrate the 4th of July. It would usually begin at midnight, either on July 3 or July 4, when a young person would climb onto the roof of the Church of the Good Shepherd and ring the bell. (Note: The tradition of ringing the bell at midnight dated back to the 1880s.) This would signal others to bring old farm carts they had stolen into Oakdale Square and light them ablaze.

In the early days, through the 1930s, police and fire officials were on hand to keep order and maintain safety. As farm carts became scarcer as Dedham and surrounding areas became more developed and less agricultural, people would begin building their own carts for the express purpose of burning them. Other times, carts would be stolen from other area communities that still had a large farm presence such as Medfield or Sharon. They would be hidden in backyards and garages until it was time to bring them to the fire.

In 1938, when no carts could be found, an old outhouse was used instead. A cart had been stolen from Canton, but police stopped the boys who were transporting it.

The fires would often grow so large and so intense that windows in the Square would crack and tar would melt. By 1959, the fires had grown so intense that the Town adopted a by-law, perhaps one of a kind, to outlaw the practice:

“No person shall set fire to or burn, or cause to be moved through any way or street of the Town, any waste material, paper, wood or any inflammable substance on any wagon, cart, buggy, push–cart or on any vehicle, with the intention of setting fire to or burning same on any way or street of the Town.”

The last fire in Oakdale Square took place in 1963. When police and the fire department arrived to shut it down, they were pelted with rocks, cherry bombs, and full cans of beer from the thousands of people there. When the fire department attempted to douse the flames, a reveler jumped into the firetruck and turned off the ignition. He was arrested.

This proved to be too much for Police Chief Walter Carroll and Fire Chief John Hartnett, and they vowed to end the tradition. July 4, 1964, was rainy, which kept the crowds at home, and the police shut down Oakdale Square on the evenings of July 3 and July 4, 1965.

Several years later, the tradition was revived in the Manor but, after an explosion and an intense fire melted the siding on a nearby house in 1990, the tradition was finally ended. In that year, propane-soaked wood in a camper trailer exploded, leading to destruction. A block party was held in MacDonald Square and attended by hundreds of people, preventing a fire from taking place. Smaller attempts were made in the following years, but the tradition died after that.

==== Antiques and Horribles parade ====
As time went on, the Antiques and Horribles parade became less of a lampoon of the Ancient and Honorable Artillery Company of Massachusetts' parade and more of a general costume parade. Those who marched in the parade and the floats they rode on came to be satirical, poking fun at current events and public figures. The 1907 parade included Siamese twins, the Wild Man of Borneo, a bearded lady, a bicycle navy, and a "nondescript what is it--man or woman--a nickle a guess." The Dedham Transcript said that parade "gave the jokesmiths a grand opportunity to wok off superflous wit."

During World War II, marchers dressed up as Adolf Hitler and Benito Mussolini were booed during the 1942 parade. The tradition continued until the 1950s, when it became a more traditional parade with bands and others, including Rex Trailer.

==== Safe and Sane 4th campaign ====
During the early years of the century, the Playground Association of America encouraged people to celebrate Independence Day safely, without fireworks or other rowdy behavior. In 1908, the Dedham Transcript ran a list of things not to do on the 4th that was a mixture of both real and tongue in cheek, including:

- Don't encourage small boys to fire large canons.
- Don't throw firecrackers at passing bicyclists.
- Don't aim a sky rocket at an upstairs window.
- Don't put firecrackers on the steps of a church.
- Don't put firecrackers under old ladies' dresses.

==== 200th Declaration of Independence anniversary ====
In anticipation of the 200th anniversary of the Declaration of Independence being signed, Public Works Commissioner Paul Sullivan had some park benches in East Dedham painted red, white, and blue in July 1975. He then had the fence posts along the Dedham Common painted with a similar patriotic color scheme, which incensed the residents of wealthy Precinct One.

Many threatened to repaint the fence white "in broad daylight" if the fence, which was variously described at as "garish," "an aesthetic outrage," "the worst of taste," and "inappropriate, incongruous and demeaning" was not restored to its original condition. A police guard had to be stationed on the Common around the clock to protect the fence that one woman said "looks like the town trollop." The Selectmen voted 3-2 to keep the red, white, and blue paint, despite a petition with over 100 signatures asking it to be restored.

In September, the newly formed Historic Districts Commission took up the matter. They voted to ask the Selectmen to repaint the fence by October 15. Rain delayed the painting, but it was restored to its original white by volunteers on 23rd.

The following June, tall grass covered the Common. It had not been mowed since the previous September, with Sullivan—who was never one to forget a favor or a slight—telling the local press that he thought the Common was now under Historic District Commission control and would only mow it at the instruction of the Selectment.

=== Flag Day ===
In 1967, the Flag Day Parade began and quickly became one of Dedham's most beloved traditions. The parade has occasionally rejected controversial floats. In 1975, the Parks and Recreation Commission unanimously refused to allow an anti-busing float during the nearby Boston desegregation busing crisis. In 1971, after Arthur "Mr. Wake Up America" Stivaletta claimed to be a co-sponsor of the parade, Recreation Director James E. Dunderdale publicly clarified that the Parks and Recreation Department was the only sponsor.

=== Christmas ===
Beginning in 1973, Nick and Robertha Civitarese began decorating their house with elaborate Christmas decorations. More than 50 years later, the tradition continues with multiple generations of families visiting the Civitarese-Cushman House in December to see the lights and displays.

=== Tercentenary ===
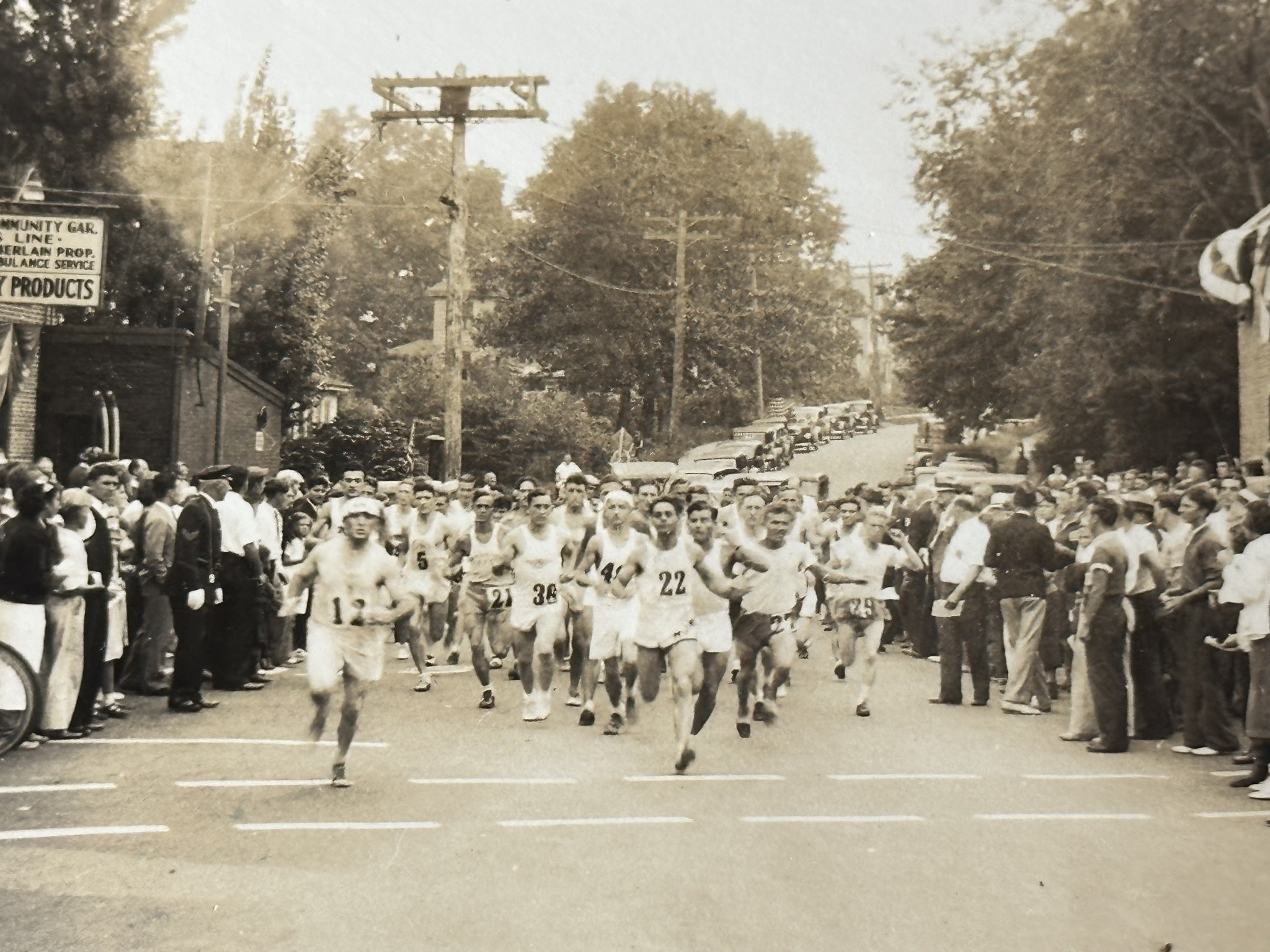
The start of a 1936 road race in Oakdale Square with Tarzan Brown and Johnny Kelley

During the 1936 tercentenary celebrations, Olympians Ellison "Tarzan" Brown and Johnny Kelley ran in a "mug hunt." The roughly 9.5 mile race was the third annual, and was sponsored by the Oakdale Athletic Club and organized by Harold Rosen. The start was in Oakdale Square and the finish was at Stone Park.

The parade included members of the Mill Village Old Homes Association and a group who march in the Town's 250th parade in 1886. The Town's tercentenary celebrations committee operated out of donated space in the Knights of Columbus building in Dedham Square.

=== Bobby Orr Day ===
Boston Bruins star Bobby Orr was made an honorary citizen of Dedham in 1970. He addressed the students of Dedham High School on March 23, 1970, a day the Selectmen declared to be Bobby Orr Day, during which he presented a pair of his ice skates to the athletic association.

== Fires ==
=== Stone mill fires ===
During the lunch break at the Cochrane Mill, a fire broke out on April 4, 1911 that quickly engulfed the mill. There were 25 employees inside, including one who was taking a nap.

Another fire broke out in the mill on May 2, 1984. This time, the mill was owned by the United Waste Company.

=== 1923 dry meadows fire ===
Starting around 1908, the bogs around the Charles and Neponset Rivers were declared to be "pest holes" and drained. During a drought in the summer of 1923, the now dry meadows caught fire and burned for weeks. Fires burned in Rodman's Woods off of Westfield Street and Job's Island (Note: Job's Island is now a peninsula at 91 Common Street.) as well as in Broad Meadow in Needham and Purgatory Swamp in Canton.

Smoke was so thick that car crashes were common and a driving ban was instituted in Dedham Square. Streetcars in the area had to be guided by men holding ropes and carrying lanterns. Members of the Department of Public Works and civilians joined the fire department, which only numbered eight men, to try and put out the flames through September and into October.

The fires became an attraction of sorts, with spectators coming to watch frogs, chipmunks, and screeching birds trying to escape the flames. The fire was not extinguished until it rained on October 15. After two months of fire, the stream produced by the rain was as thick as the smoke—which had drifted as far north as Reading at times.

=== Log Cafe fire ===
Shortly after 2 a.m. on October 19, 1940, a fire at the Log Cafe on Bridge Street was called in. The fire destroyed the Cafe and Breed's boathouse. Chief Henry J. Harrigan entered one of the buildings to inspect the progress of the fire when the floor beneath him gave way, causing him to fall 15 feet, stunning him and causing him to become overcome by smoke and heat. Fireman Joseph C. Nagle, "despite the blinding smoke and flames, rushed into the building and carried Chief Harrigan outside," suffering burns and smoke inhalation in the process.

Nagle was brought to the Dedham Emergency Hospital, and a firefighter worked on Harrigan with a pulmanator before he was taken to the Faulkner Hospital by several police officers in an ambulance. Harrigan, a 47-year veteran of the force, died slightly after 4 a.m., leaving behind a wife and four daughters. A plaque was unveiled in his honor outside the main firehouse on the 75th anniversary of his death, and both Harrigan and Nagle were posthumously awarded the Medal of Honor. Harrigan's funeral at St. Mary's Church was attended by 1,500 people, including chiefs from 100 cities and towns.

=== Rockland Street ===
In 1994, a difficult fire broke out on Rockland Street. A woman was trapped inside, and was rescued by members of Engine Company 3. The Henry J. Harrigan Medal of Honor was established to honor the members of Engine Company Three for their bravery.

== Wars ==
=== World War I ===
During World War I, 642 men from Dedham served, and 18 died. The first to enlist was Henry W. Farnsworth who fought with the French Foreign Legion and was killed in action at Tahure, France, in October 1915. Robert Bayard also died early in the war. His name is memorialized on a boulder at the Riverdale School, along with two other soldiers from Pine Heights, Charles Clough and Stanley Luke. Another soldier, Otto Miller, was the son of a German immigrant who moved to Dedham and was a machinery expert at the Merchant's Woolen Company. (Note: The Millers lived on Colburn Street. Otto was born in 1893. Henry, Otto's father, was originally from Lambrecht, Germany and was an engineer by training.)

Of the 60 soldiers who voluntarily were inoculated with the germs that caused trench fever, two, Joseph Fiola and Norman G. Barrett, were from Dedham.

To honor those who served and died in the war, the Town set aside 23 acres of marshland at the corner of East Street and Eastern Avenue and created Memorial Park. Across the street, a memorial was erected at the corner of East Street and Whiting Ave. When it was dedicated on May 17, 1931, the pastor of St. Mary's Church, Fr. George P. O'Connor, noticed that the Latin inscription at the top, Pax Victus, translated to "peace to the vanquished" instead of "peace victorious."

In 1936, the monument needed repairs and the commander of the American Legion (Note: A man named Hamilton.) looked into the matter further. He brought up the issue at Town Meeting, and newspapers around the country started running stories about how Dedham had mistakenly erected a monument to the enemies the Americans had defeated. A sum of $400 was appropriated to change the inscription to Pax Victoribus or "Peace to the Victors," but it was eventually changed to simply Pax.

=== World War II ===
Many Dedhamites served in the armed forces during World War II. One, John Hayes, was a pilot who earned a Bronze Star and a Distinguished Flying Cross. While stationed at Camp McCauley in Salzburg, Austria in 1954, he began taking children suffering from whooping cough on flights. The high altitude helped to alleviate some of their pain and discomfort. He made over 100 flights with sick children and became known as the "Whooping Cough Captain." After he died in 1954 when his single engine plane crashed, a nine foot granite obelisk was erected by local officials near the airfield in tribute to him.

Dedham's dogs also played an part in the war effort. The Dogs For Defense set up a training center for canines at the Karlstein polo grounds (Note: Located near the present day Rashi School.) In July 1942, the first class of 35 dogs were graduated after an eight week training program. They had emotional goodbyes with their owners and were then sent off to undisclosed assignments.

At least two Dedham dogs took part including a Belgian shepherd named Teddy, who was owned by the Allgaier family. Another dog, Bessie, was owned by Ford and Josephine Friend's family. After the war, when Bessie heard fireworks on the 4th of July, she would hit the ground and hide under the nearest table, just as she was trained to do during the war. (Note: The Friend family live on Emmett Avenue in East Dedham.)

==== Draft ====
Before the United States entered the Second World War, President Franklin Roosevelt signed the Selective Training and Service Act of 1940, instituting the nation's first peacetime draft. October 29, 1940, Secretary of War Henry Stimson put on a blindfold, reached his hand into a glass container, and pulled out the number 158. On Fairview Street, 22-year old Stephen Ferris was eating lunch when his mother, who was listening to the live radio broadcast, gave him the news that he had been drafted. In response, Ferris shouted "Hooray for Uncle Sam, I’m the first one!"

On November 18, 1940, a ceremony was held at the Norfolk County Courthouse to honor to Dedham residents and one Canton resident who had volunteered for a year of military service. More than 50 people attended, including members of their family, local clergy, selectmen, draft board officials, and members of V.F.W Post 2017. The young men then walked to Dedham station where they departed for Fort Devens.

As the number of recruits and draftees grew larger, the ceremony became more elaborate with marching bands and a color guard escorting the young men to the train station. Members of the public again stood on the sidewalk and cheered while the Women’s Defense Corps gave them refreshments and the Dedham Association for Men in the Service handed them a billfold full of cash. When Phillip Jackson entered the Navy in 1944, he handed the drumsticks he used as a marching band member off to his replacement before boarding his own train.

=== Vietnam War ===
During the Vietnam War, a group of friends known as the Dedham Seven served in the war. Two of them did not return home. Private First Class Neil Thalin was killed in action and Robert Jacy "Bobby" Todd was missing in action. As of 2024, Todd's remains have not been found. The remaining members have all committed to being cremated and having their ashes interred on Veteran's Hill at Brookdale Cemetery.

Others from Dedham who were killed include John Barnes, Bernard Dutton, Angelo Larraga, and Frank Litchfield. (Note: Litchfield was a 1965 graduate of Dedham High School. Just two months before he was scheduled to return home, he stepped on a booby trap and was killed.) During Barnes' second tour in Vietnam, his unit came under attack during the Battle of Dak To. Barnes was killed when he jumped on a grenade to save the lives of wounded comrades. For "conspicuous gallantry" that was "above and beyond the call of duty," Barnes posthumously received the Medal of Honor. Within hours of learning that Barnes was to be awarded the Medal of Honor, a Blue Ribbon Commission was established by the Town of Dedham to make plans for a "John A. Barnes Memorial Day." (Note: The Commission was chaired by Stan Embress, a member of the Veterans of Foreign Wars Jacob Jones Post, the same post in Dedham that Barnes joined after his first tour of duty. Also on the commission were the Town's three selectmen, Charles M. McGowan, Francis W. O'Brien, and Daniel P. Driscoll, as well as Edgar George, Ralph Timperi, John McMillian, Robert F.X. Casey, James McNichols, James Tansey, and James Cline.) On April 19, 1970, the Town of Dedham rededicated Memorial Park as Barnes Memorial Park.

=== Iran hostage crisis ===
During the Iran hostage crisis, a billboard was erected by Ackerly Communications near the corner of Rt. 1 and Eastern Avenue with a tally of how many days the hostages were being held. When the hostages were released, the words "At Last" were painted over it, the tears were removed from the Statue of Liberty, and the counter was set to 000.

== New towns and subdivisions ==
With the division and subdivision of so many communities, Dedham has been called the "Mother of Towns."

Community	Year incorporated as a town	Notes
Plainville	1905	Eastern section of town was part of the Dorchester New Grant of 1637. Separated from Wrentham.

=== New neighborhoods ===
==== Ashcroft ====
Ashcroft began to be developed in 1873, but it took off in the 20th century.

After his father's death in 1898, Ebenezer Talbot Paul (Note: Ebenezer Talbot Paul's parents were Susan and Ebenezer Paul. Paul was on the Board of Assessors in Dedham for many years. When he died in 1930, his estate was worth $1.2 million in 2022 dollars. His wife, Marietta (née Taylor), died in 1949 at the age of 92. They had no children. In Marietta's will, she stipulated that a fountain should be placed in the pond at Brookdale Cemetery and dedicated to her husband. It was dedicated in May 1953.) inherited a vast tract of land that stretched from what is today known as Oakdale, Greenlodge, Endicott, and the Manor, (Note: The family farm was located on what is today Dresser and Taylor Avenues, Beech Street, and Kimball Road.) as well as the family home at 390 Cedar St. (Note: The house was torn down, and a new one built, in the winter and spring of 2023.) In the 1920s, he began subdividing the land into house lots and named the streets after members of his family. Paul Street was named for him, while Taylor Ave was named for his wife, Marietta Taylor. Dresser Ave was named for his mother, Susan Dresser, and Crane Street for his grandmother, Martha Crane. He proposed calling the new neighborhood Ashcroft Woods.

Some of the proposed streets were never built, and a proposed intersection of Beech Street with Turner Street never materialized, likely due to a large rock in what was once known as Ogden's Woods. It was proposed that the name Mt. Vernon Street be continued on the other side of the Boston and Providence Railroad, but it was named Kimball Road instead. Paul died in 1930, but most of the homes were not built until the 1950s.

==== Greenlodge ====
In the last major development of town, the Smith Farm became the neighborhood of Greenlodge. Greenlodge became known in its early days as the Peanut Butter Valley as it was said that after paying for their expensive new homes that residents could only afford to eat peanut butter sandwiches.

==== Riverdale ====
By 1910 the area on the opposite side of the Charles River began to be developed. It was once known as Dedham Island or Cow Island, as the Long Ditch connected the river in two spots and bypassed the 'great bend.' Today, the neighborhood is known as Riverdale.

==== The Manor ====
The Sprague farm by the Neponset River became known as the Manor.

==== Fairbanks Park ====
House lots along Central Avenue and its side street began to be sold on April 19, 1894 by the Fairbanks Park Land Company. A tract of land measuring 1.7 million square feet was sold by John Bullard to Albert T. Foster of the Fairbanks Park Land Company, who intended to subdivide the land into house lots between 3,000 and 20,000 square feet. In the first year, 200 lots were sold. The company had agents riding the train to Dedham station on Sunday, Wednesday, and Saturday afternoons. Anyone who was going to look at lots would be given a free train ticket by the agent, who walked through the train with the conductor, and then a carriage ride to the office at the subdivision.

== John F. Kennedy ==
Robert F. Kennedy, Edward Kennedy, and Patricia Lawford also visited Dedham in the 1950s and 1960s.

=== Senate campaigns ===
A reception and campaign rally was held at the Ames Junior High School for John F. Kennedy in September during the 1952 United States Senate election in Massachusetts. (Note: Kennedy's cousin, John Fitzgerald, and his wife Helen (née Fitzhenry), lived at 49 Meadow Street in Dedham.) Kennedy returned to the Oakdale School in October. In 1953, he was the keynote speaker at the annual meeting of the Holy Name Society at St. Mary's Church. He spoke before 800 people at the junior high school hall. When he was running for reelection in October 1958, Kennedy and Jacqueline Kennedy were the guests of honor at a dinner at the Hotel 128. They then went to a reception at the Dedham High School.

=== Aassassination and mourning ===
When Kennedy was assassinated on November 22, 1963, Dedham mourned with the rest of the country. There was an active Kennedy Committee in the town at the time.

On the National Day of Mourning on November 25, there was a public memorial service at noon in Dedham. Town leaders, veterans groups, the Knights of Columbus and the Columbian Squires, the police and fire departments, the Women's Auxiliary, the East Dedham Improvement and Athletic Association, various town officials, and the Dedham High School marching band processed from Memorial Park to Dedham Square. When they reached the police station, Fr. David Burke from Saint Mary's and David Magara from Temple Beth David gave brief remarks with Rev. Richard Manns of St. Luke's Church and other clergy from various churches in Dedham were in attendance. There was a volley fire and a bugler who played taps.

The 5th annual torchlight parade was canceled the night before the annual Thanksgiving Day football game against Norwood High School, but Dedham won the game at home by a score of 30-0. A few weeks later, at the 153rd annual meeting of the Society in Dedham for Apprehending Horse Thieves, a moment of silence was held for the late president, and the new president, Lyndon B. Johnson, was elected as a member. The Knights of Columbus Building had the flag at half mast and the clock face was covered with black bunting.

Proposals to memorialize the president were considered in the weeks that followed, with the selectmen originally considering a standing memorial somewhere on public property. They later decided that a scholarship would be established at the High School to better "embody some of the warmth of the late president for people, some of his love for athletics and his interest in literature."

== Other ==
A postcard of Dedham Square as it appeared in the early 1900s

=== 1900s ===
In 1900, a talented young lawyer from Boston bought a home with his new wife at 194 Village Avenue. Sixteen years later Louis D. Brandeis rode the train home from his office and his wife greeted him as "Mr. Justice." While he was at work that day his appointment to the United States Supreme Court had been confirmed that day by the United States Senate. Brandeis was a member of the Dedham Country and Polo Club and the Dedham Historical Society as well as a member of the Society in Dedham for Apprehending Horse Thieves. He wrote to his brother of the town saying: "Dedham is a spring of eternal youth for me. I feel newly made and ready to deny the existence of these grey hairs."

Anna Huntington Smith moved to Dedham and established the Pine Ridge Pet Cemetery and animal sanctuary. The facility was to be a place where the working horses of Boston could rest or, if needed, be euthanized. Smith built an electrified stall on the property, which she called "the House of the Blessed Release," that would kill the horse whenever it happened to wander into it. If a horse could be saved, it was given a few weeks of rest and then returned to its owner along with a warning to take better care of the animal. As motors took the place of horses, the facility eventually changed its focus to cats and dogs instead.

=== 1910s ===
In 1919, the Dedham Fire Department switched from horse-drawn apparatus to motorized trucks.

The Mill Village Old Home Association was created in 1911, with membership limited to men who had lived in East Dedham since at least 1875. The time restriction was later amended to at least 40 years in the neighborhood. They met monthly through the late 1930s.

=== 1920s ===
In 1920, a man's skeleton was found hanging from a tree in the woods near Wigwam Pond. Another was unearthed on the eastern shore of the pond in 1924 when workers were digging a foundation for a house in Fairbanks Park near the ice houses.

In 1921, the local American Legion post moved into the home at the corner of East Street and Whiting Avenue originally built by Charles and Mary Brown. The Legion purchased the house with a $35,000 donation from Henry B. Endicott's widow.

In 1927, a stone bench and memorial plaque were installed at "the keye," the site where the first settlers disembarked from their canoes on the Charles River, where the river makes its "great bend," near what is today Ames Street. It was designed by Charles E. Millis.

=== 1940s ===
During World War II, there were 2,400 men and women who served in every branch of the armed forces. On them, 55 were killed in action.

While training for, and then winning, the 1947 Boston Marathon, Suh Yun-bok stayed at the home of Norman Paik at 26 Boulevard Road. In the weeks leading up to the race, Suh and his two Korean teammates could be seen running through the streets of Dedham near the Endicott Estate. On the evening of the race, Selectman Thomas Lilly presented Suh with congratulations from the town at a reception at the Paik home.

=== 1950s ===
The Dedham Choral Society was formed in 1955 and performed their first annual Christmas concert that year.

In 1956, the American Legion moved from the Shaw House to 155 Eastern Avenue. The Dedham Public Schools then used the house as their administrative offices.

In 1957, Joseph Demling, a resident of Macomber Terrace, walked into Town Hall with the carcass of the 35 pound bobcat. He asked for a $20 bounty on the animal, citing a by-law passed by the Town Meeting in 1734. The Town originally balked, suggesting that the animal came from Needham, but eventually paid Demling the money he requested.

=== 1960s ===
In July 1961, Connie Hines returned with great fanfare to Dedham after appearing on Mr. Ed. The 1948 Dedham High School graduate rode into Dedham Square in a convertible with a Dedham Police Department escort. The red carpet was rolled out for her in front of Memorial Hall. Town officials gave her a Key to the Town and Ralph Eaton, her principal at Dedham High School, presented her with a bouquet of roses. She later hosted a reception at Hotel 128 for her high school classmates.

After an executive order signed by President John F. Kennedy in 1961 allowed federal employees to unionize, the Federal Employees Veterans Association met in an emergency convention in Dedham. They voted to reorganize themselves into the National Association of Government Employees, today a large and powerful public union.

David Stanley Jacubanis robbed a bank in Dedham in 1962, after he was paroled in Vermont. He was, for a time, on the Federal Bureau of Investigation's 10 Most Wanted List. The day after Thanksgiving, 1963, Santa Claus arrived by helicopter and landed at the Dedham Plaza.

When a new Babe Ruth League baseball field was opened on Rustcraft Road in the 1960s, the first recorded hit there was from the bat of Kenneth Martin. Later, Martin met Sonny Liston near Mary Hartigan's restaurant. Martin invited Liston to a game at Rustcraft, and Liston accepted. The heavyweight champion was mobbed by the crowd when he arrived.

=== 1970s ===
In 1976, the Dedham Retired Men's Club was founded. Also in 1976, the Dedham Clippers Swim Team was formed by JuJu Mucciaccio.

=== 1980s ===
Mike Weir (Note: Weir would later become chief of the Dedham Police Department.) entered the Guinness Book of World Records for throwing a grape the longest distance into the mouth of another person.

=== 1990s ===
On February 17, 1992, Wake Up America demolished a Subaru in Dedham Square and then unfurled an American flag on top of it.

=== East Dedham Improvement and Athletic Association ===
The East Dedham Improvement and Athletic Association was formed "by 14 boys in the East Dedham alleys" in 1935. Within four years, they opened a clubhouse at 247 Bussey Street. The first floor had a large hall and the second featured a billiard room and a pool room. It also had a lounge with a piano and radio, a recreation room, and a meeting room.

The "I&A" sponsored athletic teams and events for the neighborhood during its decades of existence, including a 3 July parade that had a parade of horribles." Following the parade, which sometimes included so many bands that it took more than two hours to pass by, there would be fireworks and dancing at Condon Park. It once attracted more than 30,000 participants, which was far greater than the population of the entire town.

== Population ==
Historical population

Year	Pop.
1637	31 men, plus their families
1640	>200
1648	~400
1651	~100 families
Late 1650s	150+ men, plus others
1666	83 legal voters
1686	>600
1700	700–<750 (Note: In 1711, there were 45 families living north of the Charles River.)
1736	1,200
1750	1,500–1,600
1761	<1,900
1765	1,919
1775	>2,000
1790	1,659
1800	1,973

Year	Pop.
1801	2,000
1830	3,057
1837	3,532
1850	4,447
1860	6,330
1865	7,198 (Note: 27% of the population was foreign-born, and 75% of them were from Ireland. The other 25% were German-speaking.)
1870	7,342
1880	6,233
1888	6,641 (Note: In 1880, the population of East Dedham was 3,600.)
1890	7,123
1892	>7,000
1895	7,211
1899	6,641 (Note: The population decreased in 1897 when Westwood separated and became its own town. The proportion of foreign-born residents then grew to more than 28%.)
1900	7,457
1908	7,774

Year	Pop.
1910	6,641
1915	9,284
1920	10,782
1930	11,043
1940	15,136
1950	15,508
1960	18,407
1970	23,869
1980	26,938
1990	25,298
2000	23,782
2002	23,378
2010	24,729
2020	25,364
2023	24,968

== Works cited ==
- Abbott, Katharine M. (1903). Old Paths And Legends Of New England (PDF). New York: The Knickerbocker Press. pp. 290–297.
- Commonwealth of Massachusetts (1931). Election Statistics 1931.
- Dedham Historical Society (2001). Images of America: Dedham. Arcadia Publishing. ISBN 978-0-7385-0944-0.
- Free Public Library Commission of Massachusetts (1908). Report of the Free Public Library Commission of Massachusetts. Secretary of the Commonwealth.
- Hanson, Robert Brand (1976). Dedham, Massachusetts, 1635-1890. Dedham Historical Society.
- Knudsen, Harold M. (2025). Fisher Ames, Christian Founding Father & Federalist. Liberty Hill Publishing.
- Lockridge, Kenneth (1985). A New England Town. New York: W.W. Norton & Company. ISBN 978-0-393-95459-3.
- Massachusetts Board of Library Commissioners (1899). Report of the Free Public Library Commission of Massachusetts.
- Neiswander, Judith (2024). Mother Brook and the Mills of East Dedham. Damianos Publishing. ISBN 978-1-941573-66-2.
- Parr, James L. (2009). Dedham: Historic and Heroic Tales From Shiretown. The History Press. ISBN 978-1-59629-750-0.
- The Commonwealth of Massachusetts (1910). Election Statistics.
- Secretary of the Commonwealth (1908). Election Statistics.
- Smith, Frank (1936). A History of Dedham, Massachusetts. Transcript Press, Incorporated.
- Worthington, Erastus (1827). The History of Dedham: From the Beginning of Its Settlement, in September 1635, to May 1827. Dutton and Wentworth. pp. 106–107.
