= Barnes Memorial Park =

Park in Dedham, Massachusetts

Coordinates: 42°14′44″N 71°10′11″W

Barnes Memorial Park, also known as Memorial Park, is a public park in Dedham, Massachusetts, dedicated in honor of John Andrew Barnes III and the men of Dedham who served in World War I.

== World War I ==
A committee was appointed in 1924 to devise an appropriate war memorial to honor those who served and died in World War I. (Note: The committee consisted of John W. Withington, Ralph Lowell, William F. Clark, H. Wendell Endicott, (Note: Endicott was the builder of the MIT Endicott House.) Francis W. Fay, Mary M. Hansen, and Frank W. Kimball.) It was decided to dedicate a park in their honor, as it would be large enough to be impressive, and it would serve those whom the veterans fought and died for back home. It was hoped that it would be used as a common meeting place, where people could congregate and recreate.

The committee proposed setting aside 23 acres of unattractive marshland at the corner of East Street and Eastern Avenue with the hope that it would grow more beautiful each year as a "Garden of Remembrance." The land was an ancient Indian burial ground. (Note: The last person known to have been buried there was Sarah David, the wife of Alexander Quapish.) The estimated cost was $114,500. When the voters considered it on May 25, 1926, it was voted down, 1,981 to 584.

A second committee was then appointed to erect a memorial. (Note: This committee was composed of Daniel R. Beckford Jr., John J. Shea, Julius H. Tuttle, Charles E. Mills, Robert H. Luke, and James F. McGowan.) On May 17, 1931, a memorial was unveiled at the corner of East Street and Whiting Ave with Chairman Daniel R. Beckford Jr. presiding. (Note: At the time, that portion of East Street was known as Avery Street.) For the first 30 minutes of the ceremony, which began at 2:00, music was played by the American Legion's Weymouth Post Band. The High School Glee Club then sang America the Beautiful. Rev. Francis Lee Whittenmore offered an invocation, and Rev. George P. O'Connor, the pastor of St. Mary's Church, later offered a benediction.

The dedication of the monument was conducted by members of Dedham's American Legion Post 18 and Veteran's of Foreign Wars Post 2017. Albert Werner, commander of the American Legion, unveiled the monument, Robert Luke presented it, and Commander John F. Dervan of the Veteran's of Foreign Wars laid a laurel wreath at its base. A past department commander of the American Legion, Francis Good, gave a speech. The architect was E. Howard Walker and the sculptor was Frederick W. Allen. The stone monument features a woman holding a sprig of a palm branch in her right hand and her left hand raised in the air.

The monument was officially presented by Beckford and accepted by the Town by Selectman Anson H. Smith, a past commander of Post 18. Taps were sounded, and there was a volley fire.

O'Connor noticed at the dedication that the Latin inscription at the top, Pax Victus, translated to "peace to the vanquished" instead of the intended "Peace Victorious." In 1936, the monument needed repairs and the commander of the American Legion (Note: A man named Hamilton.) looked into the matter further. He brought up the issue at Town Meeting, and newspapers around the country started running stories about how Dedham had mistakenly erected a monument to the enemies the Americans had defeated. A sum of $400 was appropriated to change the inscription to Pax Victoribus or "Peace to the Victors," but it was eventually changed to simply Pax.

== Renaming in honor of John Barnes ==
After graduating from Dedham High School, John Andrew Barnes enlisted in the United States Army and served in the Vietnam War. He was posthumously awarded the Medal of Honor for his actions during the Battle of Dak To when he jumped on a grenade to save the lives of wounded comrades.

Within hours of learning that Barnes was to be awarded the Medal of Honor, a Blue Ribbon Commission was established by the Town of Dedham to make plans for a "John A. Barnes Memorial Day." (Note: The Commission was chaired by Stan Embress, a member of the Veterans of Foreign Wars, Jacob Jones Post, the same post in Dedham that Barnes joined after his first tour of duty. Also on the commission were the Town's three selectmen, Charles M. McGowan, Francis W. O'Brien, and Daniel P. Driscoll, as well as Edgar George, Ralph Timperi, John McMillian, Robert F.X. Casey, James McNichols, James Tansey, and James Cline.) On April 19, 1970, The Town of Dedham rededicated Memorial Field as John A. Barnes III Memorial Park. At the ceremony, dignitaries, V.F.W. members from dozens of towns, and local marching bands proceeded to the intersection of East Street and Eastern Ave., where a marble monument was unveiled in Barnes' honor. Among the speakers that day was Congressman James A. Burke.

== Facilities ==
At the park is the Paul Sullivan softball field, Jack Heaphy baseball field, Ricardo Gonzales soccer field, and Maryanne Lewis playground. It is also home to a Little Free Library designed by Lisa Houck.

== Dedham Day ==
Since 1990, Memorial Park has been home to Dedham Day. At the event, which has rides, games, and other activities, the highlight is a pair of cows. Attendees can purchase a plot of land on the field for the day and, if a cow defecates on their plot, the owner wins a cash prize.

== Kennedy assassination ==
When John F. Kennedy was assassinated on November 22, 1963, Dedham mourned with the rest of the country. On the National Day of Mourning on November 25, there was a public memorial service at noon in Dedham. Town leaders, veterans groups, the Knights of Columbus, the police and fire departments, the Women's Auxiliary, and the Dedham High School marching band processed from Memorial Park to Dedham Square. When they reached the police station, clergy from the various churches in Dedham gave brief remarks. There was a volley fire and a bugler who played taps.

== Works cited ==
- Parr, James L. (2009). Dedham: Historic and Heroic Tales From Shiretown. The History Press. ISBN 978-1-59629-750-0.
- Smith, Frank (1936). A History of Dedham, Massachusetts. Transcript Press, Incorporated.
