= Endicott House =

Conference center in Dedham, Massachusetts

Coordinates: 42°15′14.16″N 71°11′28.75″W

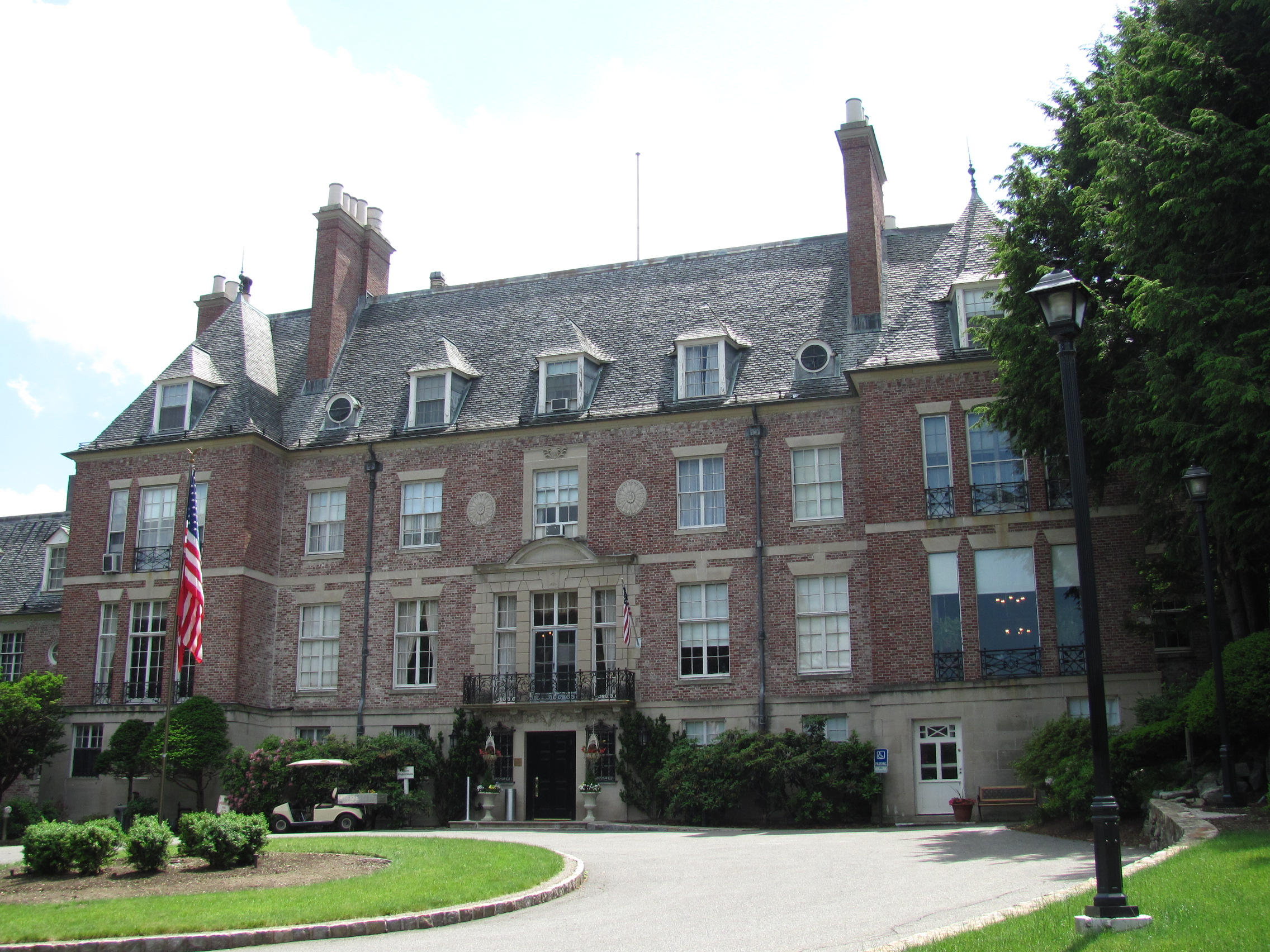
Endicott House

The MIT Endicott House is a conference center located in Dedham, Massachusetts, about 10 miles (16 km) southwest of downtown Boston. The center consists of the Endicott mansion, a Normandy French-style chateau, along with an art lecture facility known as the Brooks Center, and 25 acres (100,000 m^{2}) of gardens, lawn, woods and ponds. Since 1955, when it was given to Massachusetts Institute of Technology by the Endicott family, it has been owned and operated by MIT. It is one of the oldest such facilities in the United States. Endicott House serves as a meeting facility for many MIT departments and is the primary site of the Senior Executive Program of the MIT Sloan School of Management. The house also hosts conferences and meetings for other educational, medical, governmental, and nonprofit organizations.

It is known for its expansive grounds, about which landscape historian Elizabeth Hope Cushing has said "This is the story of a manmade space that has lasted, altered but unbroken, for over one hundred years, entering the twentyfirst century with the potential to be the magical landscape of General Stephen M. Weld’s initial creation."

== History ==
=== Grounds ===
Endicott House stands on a site previously occupied by "Rockweld," the home of American Civil War hero General Stephen Minot Weld Jr. Weld began designing the vast gardens during the 1880s, and hired the landscape architecture firm of Frederick Law Olmsted to advise him, although most of the designs were his own. Olmsted designed the steep, winding driveway approach to the house.

The property has a varied topography with rock outcroppings, a glacial bowl and steep hills. Weld used the land to create a series of ponds, waterfalls, open vistas, and winding forest paths. The rock garden he designed was described in 1884 as “the first great rock garden in North America.” Today, "Weld’s landscape is nationally known as an early and particularly fine example of the naturalistic style of landscape architecture."

Over 500 different species of plants adorned the grounds by the 1920s, including trainloads of azaleas and rhododendrons that were imported from southern states. Eight gardeners and several greenhouses were employed to maintain it all.

=== Endicotts ===
H. Wendell Endicott and his wife Priscilla Maxwell Endicott purchased the property in 1931, and knocked down Weld's house, and renamed the estate "Rockwood." Endicott had a fondness for spring-blooming trees and flowers, especially daffodils. On one Sunday each spring, he would open the grounds to the public for them to enjoy.

The Endicott House was designed by Charles Adams Platt. The Endicotts were involved in every step of building and decorating the home. They commissioned Italian painters to create the intricate designs on the living room's beamed ceiling and imported marble fireplaces for each room. Upon completion in 1934, Mr. & Mrs. Endicott moved in with their two children, Bradford and Priscilla Endicott, and Martha Endicott, Mr. Endicott's daughter by his first wife, Martha Barron, who had died in childbirth. Today the house retains much original character and artwork, antiques, oriental rugs, and Flemish tapestries donated by the Endicott family.

Endicott's father, Henry Bradford Endicott was the founder of the Endicott Shoe Company, which maintained a sales office in Boston and a manufacturing plant in Endicott-Johnson City, New York. His grandfather was Augustus Bradford Endicott, a businessman and state and local official, and his sister was Katherine Endicott, who left the Endicott Estate to the Town of Dedham.
