= Francis Harding =

Francis Harding may refer to:

- Francis Appleton Harding, Massachusetts politician
- Francis Pym Harding, British army officer
