= Robert Crawley =

Robert Crawley may refer to:

- Robert L. Crawley (fl. 1970–1984), American politician from Massachusetts
- Lord Robert Crawley, a character in British TV series Downton Abbey
