= William Moseley =

William Moseley may refer to:

== Entertainment ==
- Bill Moseley (born 1951), American film actor and musician
- William Moseley (actor) (born 1987), English actor from The Chronicles of Narnia
- Will Moseley, a contestant on the twenty-second season of American Idol

== Politics ==
- William A. Moseley (1798–1873), U.S. Representative from New York
- William Dunn Moseley (1795–1863), Governor of the U.S. state of Florida
- William G. Moseley (Massachusetts politician) (fl. early 1900s), a Massachusetts politician

== Others ==
- William G. Moseley (born 1965), geographer at Macalester College
- William Mosley (born 1989), American basketball player
- Bill Moseley (bowls) (born 1945), South African lawn bowls player
