= Christopher M. Lane =

American politician

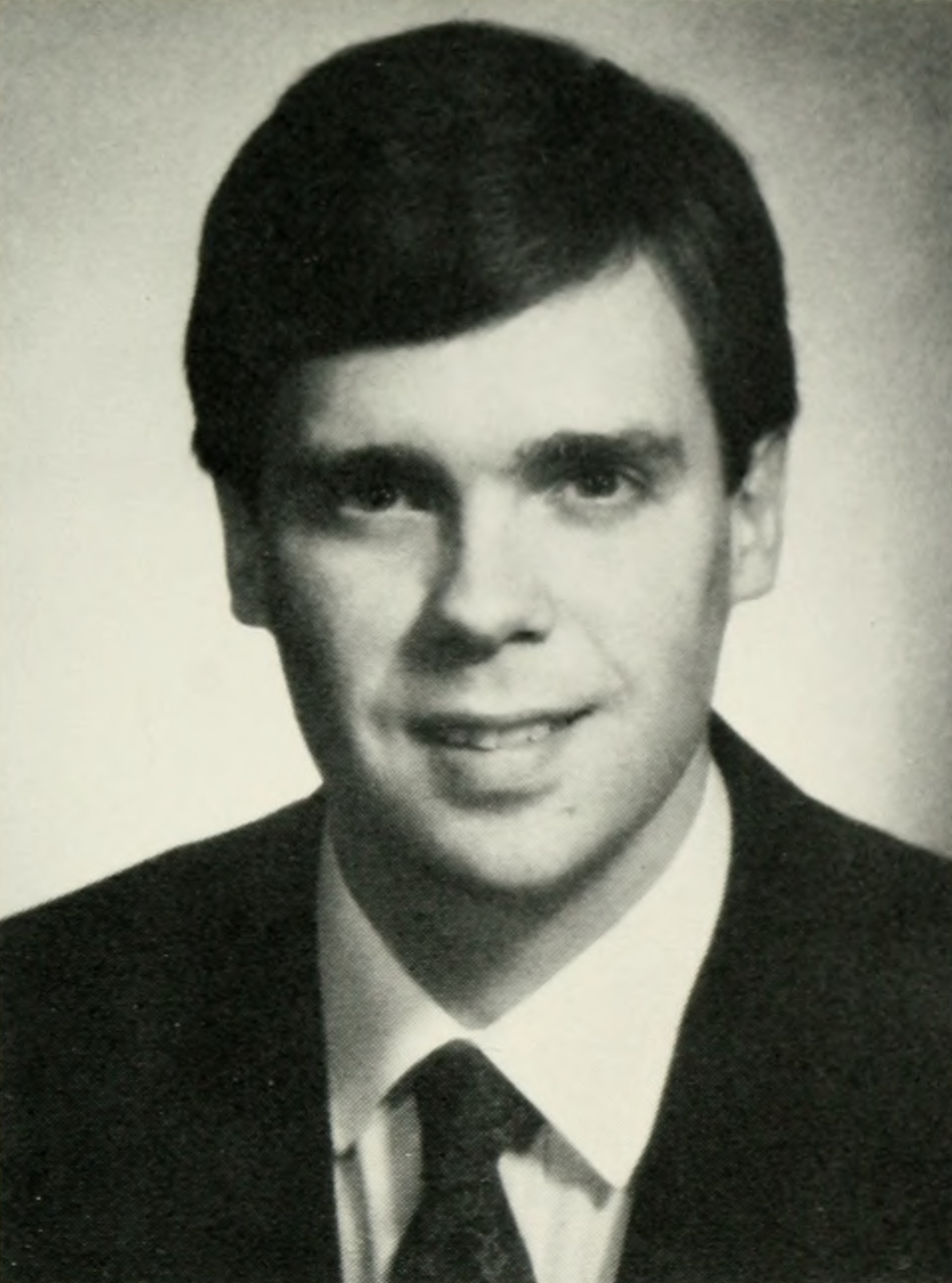
Christopher M. Lane

Christopher M. Lane was a Republican member of the Massachusetts Senate. He first won election in 1990 and was defeated in 1992 by Marian Walsh. He ran again in 1994 but lost to William R. Keating.
