= Robert K. Coughlin =

American politician

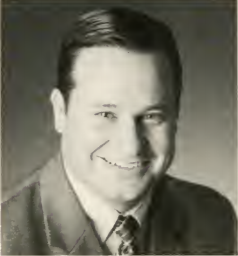

Member of Dedham Town Meeting from the fifth Precinct
- Incumbent
- Assumed office August 10, 2020

Member of the Massachusetts House of Representatives from the 11th Norfolk district
- In office 2003 – January 29, 2007
- Preceded by: Maryanne Lewis
- Succeeded by: Paul McMurtry

Member of the Dedham Board of Selectmen
- In office 1995–2004

Member of the Dedham School Committee
- In office 1991–1993

Personal details
- Born: April 22, 1969 (age 57)
- Party: Democratic
- Spouse: Christine

Robert K. Coughlin is an American politician, CEO, and real estate executive from Massachusetts. A Democrat, he served in the Massachusetts House of Representatives from 2003 to 2007 from the Eleventh Norfolk District, encompassing his hometown of Dedham, Westwood, and the Eighth Precinct of Walpole. He later served as Undersecretary of Housing and Economic Development and then President of the Massachusetts Biotechnology Council. He is currently a member of the life sciences team at JLL.

== Personal life ==
From age five, Coughlin yearned to follow in the footsteps of his father, Dedham Selectman Paul P. Coughlin. After graduating from Dedham Public Schools, the younger Coughlin earned a degree in Marine Engineering from the Massachusetts Maritime Academy in 1991. There, he served in the Student Government Association and was a member of the rugby club.

== Political career ==
Coughlin's career started at age 20, when he became the youngest member of Dedham's School Committee. In 1995, he became the youngest member of Dedham's Board of Selectmen. He served as both vice chair and chair of the board.

In 2002, Coughlin ran for state representative from the 11th Norfolk district, defeating incumbent Maryanne Lewis in the Democratic primary and Joseph A. Pascarella in the general election.

As state representative, Coughlin started by sitting on the Joint Committee on Health Care, the House Long-Term Debt and Capital Expenditures Committee, and the House Homeland Security and Federal Affairs Committee. During the 184th General Court, Coughlin became Vice Chair of the Joint Committee on Revenue, and he sat as a member on the Joint Committee on Financial Services and the Joint Committee on Health Care Financing.

Coughlin left the General Court to serve as the Undersecretary for Business Development in the Executive Office of Housing and Economic Development for Governor Deval Patrick. While in this position, The Boston Globe reported that Coughlin waited six weeks to tell his bosses he was talking to recruiters about a biotech council job, even though he was working on state biotech initiatives. Coughlin denied the allegations.

In the 2020s, Coughlin was elected to a seat in Dedham's Town Meeting. In 2026, he lost a race for moderator to Liz O'Donnell.

== Biotech Industry ==
Coughlin served as president and CEO of the Massachusetts Biotechnology Council from 2008 to 2021. MassBio's mission is to advance Massachusetts' leadership in the life sciences, to grow the industry, to add value to the healthcare, and to improve patient lives. In his last year there, he was paid $1.2 million.

As of early 2021, Coughlin is an executive with JLL. Coughlin's son has cystic fibrosis. Coughlin also manages a group called Bobby's Brigade, an organization in partnership with the Cystic Fibrosis Foundation to raise funds to help find a cure for CF.
