= Marie-Louise Kehoe =

American politician

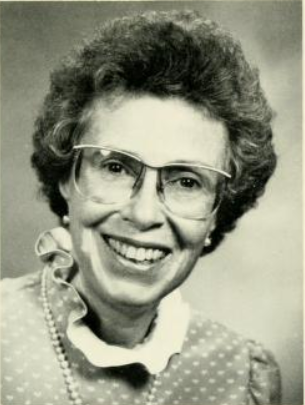

Member of the Massachusetts House of Representatives from the 11th Norfolk district
- In office 1983–1995
- Preceded by: Deborah R. Cochran
- Succeeded by: Maryanne Lewis

Personal details
- Party: Democratic

Marie-Louise Kehoe (born December 12, 1928) is a former member of the Massachusetts House of Representatives. She was first elected in 1982 and was reelected in every election through 1992, after which she chose to step down.

She also served for many years as a selectman in Dedham, Massachusetts and was the grand marshal of the 2009 Flag Day Parade.

== Planning Board ==
Before becoming a state representative, Kehoe served on Dedham' Planning Board. At the 1972 Annual Town Meeting, the Library Trustees made a new pitch for two of the Endicott Estate's 26 acres, including the garage. Town Meeting appropriated $68,000 to convert the garage to a branch library. The final cost was $71,000.

The Planning Board rejected the Library Trustee's first proposal for a parking plan when Kehoe changed her vote. The vote delayed the awarding of the contract for the renovation of the Estate's garage into a library.
