= Senator Faxon =

Senator Faxon may refer to:

- Jack Faxon (1936–2020), Michigan State Senate
- William Otis Faxon (1853–1942), Massachusetts State Senate
