= Harold Rosen (politician) =

American politician (1906–1989)

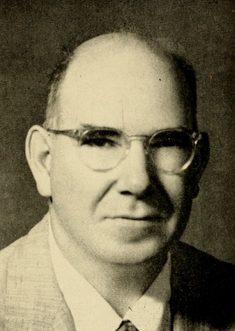

Harold E. Rosen (October 1, 1906 – May 8, 1989) was an American politician from Dedham, Massachusetts. He served in local politics and then six terms in the Massachusetts House of Representatives as a Republican from 1957 to 1969.

== Personal life ==
He was born in Boston but moved to Dedham as a child and was graduated from Dedham High School in 1923 and then from Boston University, where he ran track, in 1928. He was the co-owner of Rosen's Hardware in East Dedham 1927 to 1966 with his brother. During World War II he served as a first lieutenant in the Army. In 1986, he was given the Outstanding Alumni Award from his alma mater, Dedham High School.

Rosen was a member of the Dedham Rotary Club and The Society in Dedham for Apprehending Horse Thieves, a commander of the Dedham American Legion Post 18, a director of the Dedham Chamber of Commerce, a director of Dedham Family Services, and a corporator of the Dedham Institution for Savings. Rosen was Jewish. Rosen was active in the Amateur Athletic Union, and helped organize races that brought Olympic athletes to the streets of Dedham.

He died of heart failure at Milton Health Care Nursing Home in Milton, Massachusetts at the age of 82. Rosen was buried in Knollwood Memorial Park in Canton, Massachusetts after a funeral led by Rabbi Henry Zoob of Temple Beth David in Westwood. At his death he left behind a wife, Leila (née Bower), and a sister, Lena Howard of Hampton, N.H.

== Political career ==
=== Local politics ===
First elected in 1938, he served a total of five terms totaling 15 years on the Dedham School Committee. He lost an election in 1936, but then won in 1938 by defeating an incumbent. He also served three terms as a Commissioner of the Trust Funds later in life. He was an active member of the Republican Party, being elected chairman of the Dedham Republican Town Committee in 1952.

=== State politics ===
Rosen served six terms as a representative to the Great and General Court. He was a delegate to the Republican State Convention ten times and served on the Republican State Committee. He was regarded as being hard working and had a moderate to liberal record.

While in the legislature he sponsored a bill to reform the Electoral College, which would have prevented him from later serving on it in later years, but the bill did not pass. He also filed a bill to make the Endicott Estate the governor's mansion, and to make it a crime to assault a reporter. He opposed the creation of a 10-member Consumer Council to aid the governor and legislature in creating policy, and the construction of a parking garage under the Boston Common.

As a former track athlete, Rosen was a great supporter of the construction on an indoor track. He filed the first bills in 1958 and 1962 calling for the Metropolitan District Commission to build what would eventually open as the Reggie Lewis Track and Athletic Center in 1995.

Rosen also supported an amendment to a bill that would prevent any person named by the state or federal governments to be a Communist from sitting on an Advisory Committee on Racial Imbalance. He was also a supporter of organ transplantation. He was unaware when a constituent used another representative to introduce a bill, and got it passed by both houses, that would alter the procedures regarding Dedham's Town Meeting.

Rosen proposed a Constitutional amendment to give the governor and other Constitutional Officers four-year, instead of two-year, terms. Other constitutional amendments he filed would prohibit the General Court from considering matters other than budgets, items related to the administration of municipalities, special messages from the Governor, and other emergency items in the second year of their two-year session.

He ran in 1968 for an open Senate seat, but lost in the primary. He ran again in 1972, but was unsuccessful.

=== National politics ===
Rosen was invited to President Eisenhower's first inauguration in 1953. He was a leader of a slate of candidates, aligned with Governor John A. Volpe, who were not elected to attend to 1968 Republican National Convention, but did eventually attend three times. He supported Gerald Ford in the 1976 convention.

In 1980, Rosen ran as an uncommitted delegate. He was nominated from the floor and beat a candidate pledged to support Ronald Reagan in an election that was contested with allegations of fraudulent certification. In the end, he supported Reagan at the convention. Four years later, he had reservations about Reagan's performance as president, but supported him again at the 1984 convention.

He chaired Massachusetts Senior Citizens for Reagan-Bush in 1980 and served as a member of the Massachusetts Electoral College in 1980 and 1984.

== Later career ==
After losing a race for the state Senate, Rosen applied for and received a state pension. He then took a position with the Department of Commerce and Development. Governor Francis W. Sargent vetoed a bill that would allow him to return to the pension system, but it was overridden by the General Court. Rosen paid back what he previously received and was re-admitted to the system.
