= Patrick J. Kearney =

American politician

Patrick Kearney
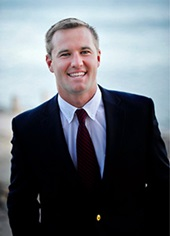

Member of the Massachusetts House of Representatives from the 4th Plymouth District
- Incumbent
- Assumed office January 2, 2019
- Preceded by: Jim Cantwell

Personal details
- Party: Democratic
- Parent: Maryanne Lewis (mother)
- Education: Massachusetts Maritime Academy

Patrick Joseph Kearney is an American politician who represents the 4th Plymouth District in the Massachusetts House of Representatives. The district consists of Precincts 1,2,3,5,6, and 7 of the town of Marshfield, the town of Scituate, and Precinct 3 of the town of Norwell, in the county of Plymouth. Kearney serves on the House Committee on Ways and Means, the Joint Committee on Cannabis Policy, the Joint Committee on Election Laws, the Joint Committee on Housing, and the Joint Committee on Ways and Means. He is a commissioned officer in the US Navy Reserve. He is the son of former state representative Maryanne Lewis.

== Committee Assignments ==
For the 2025-26 Session, Kearney sits in the following committees in the House:

- House Committee on Intergovernmental Affairs
- House Committee on Ways and Means
- Joint Committee on Community Development and Small Businesses
- Joint Committee on Veterans and Federal Affairs
- Joint Committee on Ways and Means
