= Deborah R. Cochran =

American politician (1939–2004)

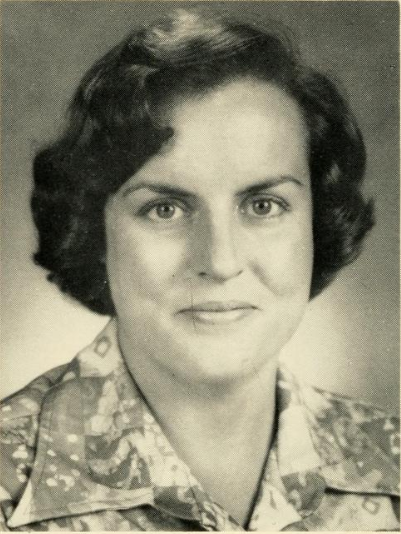

Member of the Massachusetts House of Representatives from the 11th Norfolk District
- In office 1979–1983
- Preceded by: Paul M. Goulston
- Succeeded by: Marie-Louise Kehoe

Personal details
- Born: September 18, 1939 New York City
- Died: October 20, 2004 (aged 65)
- Party: Republican
- Education: Wellesley College; New York University; Smith College
- Occupation: Child abuse investigation coordinator; Politician

Deborah R. Cochran was an American politician who represented the 11th Norfolk District in the Massachusetts House of Representatives. She was also the Republican nominee in Massachusetts's 9th congressional district in 1982 and Massachusetts Secretary of the Commonwealth in 1986.

== Early and personal life ==
Cochran was born on September 18, 1939, in New York City. She attended Wellesley College, New York University, and Smith College. Prior to entering politics, Cochran worked as a child abuse investigation coordinator. She was married to Dr. Thomas Cochran, Jr., a plastic surgeon, and they had several children before their divorce.

== Political career ==
Cochran began her political career in Dedham, Massachusetts, where she was a town meeting member and chairman of the Republican town committee.

From 1979 to 1983, Cochran represented the 11th Norfolk District in the Massachusetts House of Representatives. In 1982 she ran against Joe Moakley in Massachusetts's ninth congressional district. She lost 64% to 34%.

In 1986 she was recruited by leaders in the Massachusetts Republican Party to challenge Secretary of the Commonwealth Michael J. Connolly. She lost 68% to 32%.

In 1992, she served as David J. Lionett's campaign manager in his race for the seat in Massachusetts's 3rd congressional district. He lost in the Republican primary to Peter I. Blute.

== Death ==
Cochran died on October 20, 2004.

Party political offices
Preceded by Jody DeRoma Dow	Republican nominee for Secretary of the Commonwealth of Massachusetts; 1986	Succeeded by Paul McCarthy
