= Ursuline Academy (Dedham, Massachusetts) =

Private school in Dedham, Massachusetts, United States

Location
- 85 Lowder Street; Dedham, (Norfolk County), Massachusetts 02026; United States
- Coordinates: 42°14′42″N 71°11′3″W

Information
- Type: Private
- Motto: Serviam (I will serve.)
- Religious affiliation: Roman Catholic
- Established: 1819
- Sister school: Xaverian Brothers High School
- President: Kathleen Nolan Levesque
- Principal: Mary-Kate Tracy-Robidoux
- Grades: 7–12
- Gender: Girls
- Colors: Dark Green and White
- Slogan: Serviam
- Song: "Serviam"
- Mascot: Bear
- Nickname: UA
- Team name: Bears
- Accreditation: New England Association of Schools and Colleges
- Publication: Serviam Magazine
- Newspaper: The Blazer
- Yearbook: Olim
- Website: www.ursulineacademy.net

Ursuline Academy is a private Catholic school located in Dedham, Massachusetts, United States. It provides education in all areas for young women in grades 7–12 and offers over 20 clubs and 15 varsity sports. It is part of the Roman Catholic Archdiocese of Boston and is sponsored by the Ursuline Educational Foundation. The academy occupies a 28-acre campus.

== History ==
The first Ursuline Academy in the Boston area opened in Charlestown in 1819 by the Ursuline Sisters. After the Ursuline Convent riots, the Ursulines left Boston. They would not return until the 1940s when they were invited by Cardinal Richard Cushing to open a new school for girls. In 1957, the growing school relocated to its present site in an estate on Dedham's Federal Hill.

On October 18, 2024, a mass was held in the schools gymnasium to mark the transfer of sponsorship from the Ursuline Sisters to the Ursuline Education Foundation, a lay-led organization. During the mass, a silver ciborium was transferred from Sister Elisa Ryan, the prioress of the Ursuline Sisters of the Central Province, to Kate Levesque, the head of school.

The ciborium was originally used by the French Navy in the 1700s and eventually was given to a Boston priest, possibly Bishop Jean-Louis Lefebvre de Cheverus. It was used in the Charlestown convent before the riot, and was saved when a group of sisters hid it below a clump of asparagus in the garden. It eventually made its way into the Boston College archives before being returned to Ursuline Academy for the transfer of sponsorship.

== Athletics ==
Ursuline Academy competes at the Division III or IV level (dependent on the sport) within the Massachusetts Interscholastic Athletic Association. Teams are offered at the Junior High (grades 7 and 8), JV, and Varsity levels.

In the fall, cross country, field hockey, soccer, swimming and diving, and volleyball are offered. Winter sports include basketball, downhill skiing, ice hockey, and indoor track. The spring sports are golf, lacrosse, sailing, softball, tennis, and track and field.

== Notable alumna ==
- Marian Walsh, Massachusetts State Senator

== See also ==
- History of education in Dedham, Massachusetts
