= John Andrew Barnes III =

American private first class during the Vietnam War

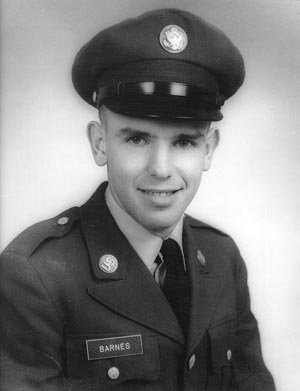
- Born: April 16, 1945; Boston, Massachusetts, U.S.
- Died: November 12, 1967 (aged 22); Dak To, Kon Tum Province, South Vietnam
- Burial place: Brookdale Cemetery, Dedham, Massachusetts
- Military career
- Allegiance: United States
- Branch: United States Army
- Service years: 1965–1967
- Rank: Private first class
- Nickname: "Jackie"
- Units: Company C, 503rd Infantry Regiment, 173rd Airborne Brigade
- Conflicts: Dominican Civil War; Vietnam War; Operation Attleboro; Battle of Dak To †
- Awards: Medal of Honor; Bronze Star Medal; Purple Heart

John Andrew Barnes III (April 16, 1945 – November 12, 1967) was a soldier of the United States Army during the Vietnam War. He was posthumously awarded the Medal of Honor for his actions during the Battle of Dak To.

Adopted as a child, Barnes joined the army after graduating from Dedham High School in 1964. After serving in the Dominican Civil War and completing a tour of duty in Vietnam, he volunteered to go back to the war. During Barnes' second tour, his unit came under attack during the Battle of Dak To. Barnes was killed when he jumped on a grenade to save the lives of wounded comrades. For "conspicuous gallantry" that was "above and beyond the call of duty", Barnes received the Medal of Honor.

== Early life and education ==
Barnes was born in Boston, Massachusetts on April 16, 1945. At age two, he was adopted by John A. Barnes Jr. and his wife, Katherine (née Hermes). Their 18-year-old daughter, Carson, was a freshman in college at the time. From a young age, Barnes expressed an interest in joining the Army.

As a child, Barnes lived in Belmont before moving to Dedham during his sophomore year of high school. (Note: He lived at 48 Peacedale Road in Belmont and 246 Colwell Drive in Dedham.) He wanted to leave Dedham High School early to become a Marine aviator, but his parents talked him into finishing. Barnes graduated in 1964. He was described by his sister as "an average student, quiet, and shy," as well as "very dedicated, very patriotic." While in high school, Barnes served in the Civil Air Patrol and drilled at the South Weymouth Naval Air Station.

== Career ==
Shortly after graduating from Dedham High School, Barnes enlisted in the United States Army and went through basic training at Fort Pickett. Carson was surprised that Barnes enlisted so soon after graduation, but said that he "felt determined that it was the right thing to do." Barnes also trained at the engineering school at Fort Benning. He served for a year in Santo Domingo during the Dominican Civil War.

=== Vietnam War ===
Barnes was dispatched to Vietnam as part of the 173rd Airborne Brigade on May 31, 1966, during the Vietnam War. Serving in Company C of the 1st Battalion, 503d Infantry, he was assigned as a grenadier. Soldiers of the brigade became involved in Operation Attleboro in the fall of 1966, an operation that started out as a small search and destroys mission north of Saigon but eventually involved 22,000 troops from 21 battalions. After serving a single tour, Barnes was sent home, but volunteered to return to Vietnam and was sent back in the fall of 1967. According to Carson, his mother was very upset that he had volunteered to go back.

On November 12, 1967, while patrolling in the Dak To District of Kon Tum Province during the Battle of Dak To, Barnes' unit was attacked by a North Vietnamese battalion. During the battle, he manned a machine gun that had lost its crew to enemy fire and was credited with nine enemy kills. While retrieving more ammunition, Barnes dived on top of a grenade that had landed among American wounded in order to use his body to protect them from the blast. The grenade exploded, killing Barnes.

=== Medal of Honor ===
The commanding officer of Task Force Black, Captain Thomas McElwain, and Lt. Col. David J. Schumacher later clashed over McElwain's recommendation for a decoration for Barnes. Schumacher refused to endorse the recommendation, stating that he did not think medals were for "men who committed suicide."

Two years later, Barnes was posthumously awarded the Medal of Honor for his actions. His parents accepted the award on his behalf from Spiro Agnew in the Vice President's executive office in Washington, D.C. Carson and her husband, James Fleming, and the oldest four of their seven children also attended. The ceremony also honored Fr. Charles J. Watters and Robert F. Stryker.

Barnes was also awarded the Bronze Star Medal, Purple Heart, and several other medals.

==== Citation ====
Rank and organization: Private First Class, U.S. Army, Company C, First Battalion, 503d Infantry 173d Airborne Brigade. Place and date: Dak To, Republic of Vietnam, November 12, 1967. Entered service at: Boston, Mass. Born: April 16, 1945, Boston, Mass.

Medal of Honor citation reads:

For conspicuous gallantry and intrepidity in action at the risk of his life above and beyond the call of duty. Pfc. Barnes distinguished himself by exceptional heroism while engaged in combat against hostile forces. Pfc. Barnes was serving as a grenadier when his unit was attacked by a North Vietnamese force, estimated to be a battalion. Upon seeing the crew of a machine gun team killed, Pfc. Barnes, without hesitation, dashed through the bullet swept area, manned the machine gun, and killed 9 enemy soldiers as they assaulted his position. While pausing just long enough to retrieve more ammunition, Pfc. Barnes observed an enemy grenade thrown into the midst of some severely wounded personnel close to his position. Realizing that the grenade could further injure or kill the majority of the wounded personnel, he sacrificed his life by throwing himself directly onto the hand grenade as it exploded. Through his indomitable courage, complete disregard for his own safety, and profound concern for his fellow soldiers, he averted a probable loss of life and injury to the wounded members of his unit. Pfc. Barnes' extraordinary heroism, and intrepidity at the cost of his life, above and beyond the call of duty, are in the highest traditions of military service and reflect great credit upon himself, his unit, and the U.S. Army.

== Legacy ==
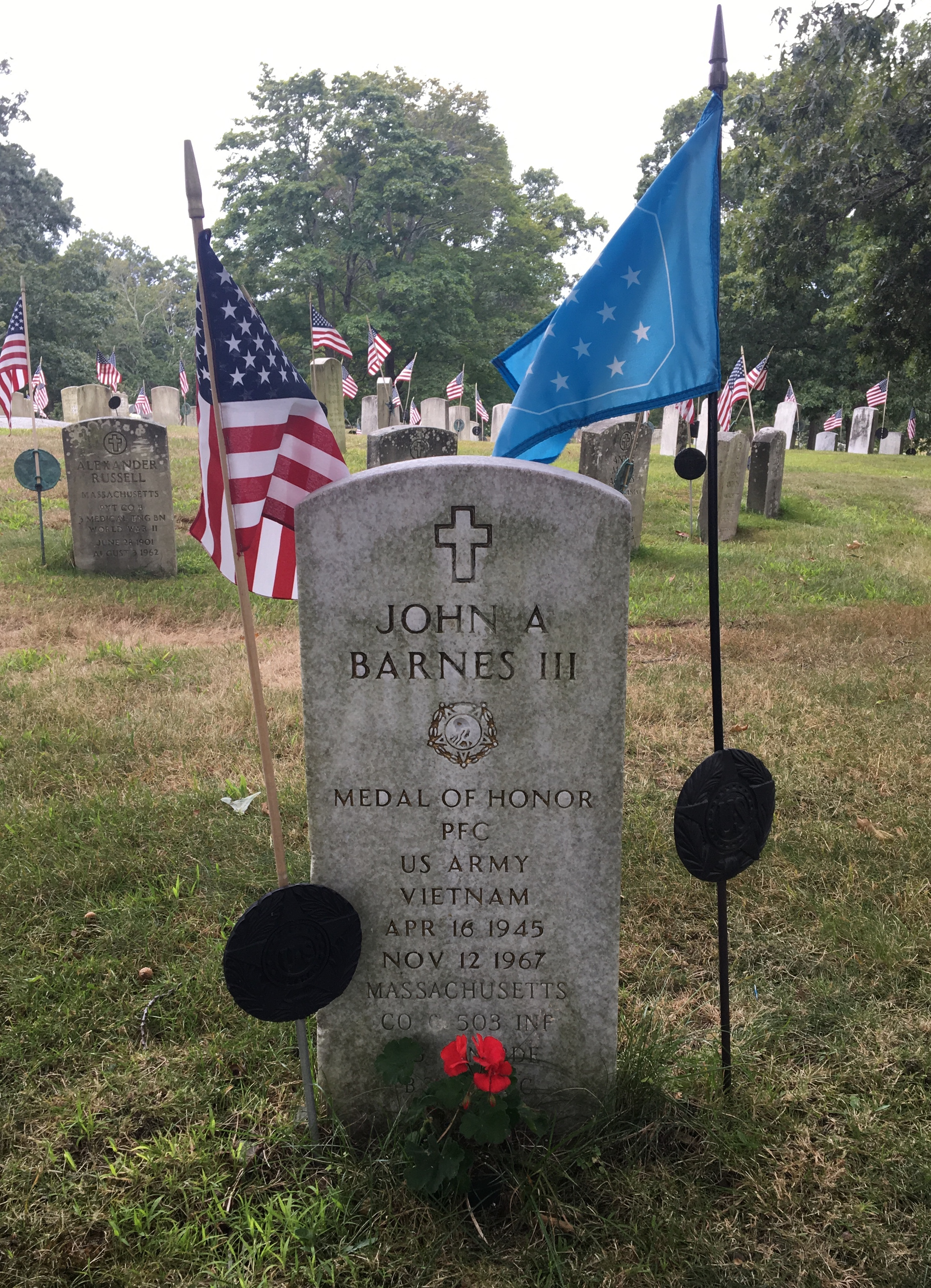
Barnes' grave on Veteran's Hill at Brookdale Cemetery

Barnes was buried in Brookdale Cemetery in Dedham, Massachusetts. His name is inscribed on Panel 29E – Row 084 of the Vietnam War Memorial. Carson Barnes Fleming believed that the distress of the loss of Barnes contributed to the deaths of their parents in the years that followed.

Within hours of learning that Barnes was to be awarded the Medal of Honor, a Blue Ribbon Commission was established by the Town of Dedham to make plans for a "John A. Barnes Memorial Day." (Note: The Commission was chaired by Stan Embress, a member of the Veterans of Foreign Wars, Jacob Jones Post, the same post in Dedham that Barnes joined after his first tour of duty. Also on the commission were the Town's three selectmen, Charles M. McGowan, Francis W. O'Brien, and Daniel P. Driscoll, as well as Edgar George, Ralph Timperi, John McMillian, Robert F.X. Casey, James McNichols, James Tansey, and James Cline.)

The street sign on Colwell Drive also now indicates that Barnes lived there. In 2025, the John Barnes Scholarship was established by the Town of Dedham's Veteran's Department for Dedham residents who were entering the military after high school. The Dedham High School class of 1968 had previously established a scholarship in his name, but it had gone dormant. General George F. Close helped to revive the scholarship and its new incarnation.

=== Barnes Memorial Park ===
On April 19, 1970, The Town of Dedham rededicated Memorial Field as John A. Barnes III Memorial Park. At the ceremony, dignitaries, V.F.W. members from dozens of towns, and local marching bands proceeded to the intersection of East Street and Eastern Ave., where a marble monument was unveiled in Barnes' honor. Among the speakers that day was Congressman James A. Burke. For several years, members of Barnes' unit, the 173rd Airborne, along with members of Dedham's American Legion and Veterans of Foreign Wars posts, stood at attention next to the monument for 24 hours over Memorial Day.

On Veteran's Day 2025, Dedham's observance of the day was held at the intersection of East Street and Eastern Avenue, at the stone monument honoring Barnes at the park named in his honor. On either side of the monument, two new benches were unveiled: one honoring Barnes, and the other honoring him and the five Dedham High School alumni who died in the war. Fundraising for the benches was conducted by the Dedham High School Alumni Association, with donations coming in from all over the country.

=== Barnes Building ===
A building used by the United States Navy, located at 495 Summer Street in Boston, was renovated and renamed for Barnes on Veteran's Day 1997, to commemorate the 30th anniversary of his death. The featured guest speaker was Congressman Joe Moakley. The ceremony also included an address by Bob Fairbairn of the Purple Heart Society, the national anthem performed by the United States Air Force Band, a color guard, tanks, military trucks and static displays.

== See also ==
- List of Medal of Honor recipients
- List of Medal of Honor recipients for the Vietnam War

== Works cited ==
- Murphy, Edward F. (2007). Dak To: America's Sky Soldiers in South Vietnam's Central Highlands. Ballantine. p. 325. ISBN 9780891419105.
