= Marian Walsh =

American politician

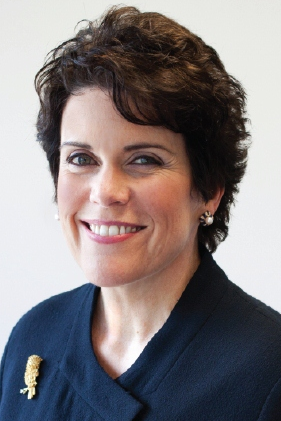

Member of the Massachusetts Senate
- In office January 1993 – January 2, 2011
- Preceded by: William R. Keating
- Succeeded by: Mike Rush
- Constituency: 1st Suffolk and Norfolk (1993-1995); Norfolk and Suffolk (1995-2003); Suffolk and Norfolk (2003-2009)

Member of the Massachusetts House of Representatives from the 10th Suffolk district
- In office January 4, 1989 – January 6, 1993
- Preceded by: Charles Robert Doyle
- Succeeded by: Vincent G. Mannering

Personal details
- Born: July 20, 1954 (age 72) Roslindale, Boston, Massachusetts
- Party: Democratic
- Education: Newton College of the Sacred Heart (BA); Harvard University (MTS); Suffolk University (JD)
- Occupation: Author, Consultant, Coach
- Website: www.marianwalsh.com

Marian Walsh (born July 20, 1954) is an American author, consultant, lawyer and former politician. She is a former State Senator in the Massachusetts Senate where she served nine terms, and a former member of the Massachusetts House of Representatives where she served two terms. She was the first woman to serve in the Massachusetts State House and the State Senate from her district. Walsh began her own consulting and coaching firm upon leaving public office. She also authored Run, a book about running for political office as well as started a campaign school at the Kennedy Library.

== Early life and education ==
Walsh was born in Roslindale section of Boston, Massachusetts. She graduated from Ursuline Academy and Newton College of the Sacred Heart with a Bachelor's degree in American Studies. She went on to earn a Master's degree in Theological Studies from Harvard Divinity School and earned a Juris Doctor from Suffolk University Law School.

== Legal career ==
Walsh is the former Chief Administrator at the Suffolk County District Attorney's Office. During her time at the district attorney's office she established the Victim/Witness Assistance Program. She also established the Homicide Response Team and the Organized Crime Division. She was later appointed Assistant Director of Governmental Relations for the Massachusetts Medical Society where she served as a lobbyist.

== Political career ==
Walsh had a 22-year career in politics, beginning with her first election in 1988 when she was voted in as a member of the Massachusetts State House. She served the 10th Suffolk District in the House of Representatives between 1988 and 1992. During her political career, she helped to pass notable legislation including an amendment to increase education funding which directly affected Norfolk County Agricultural High School. She voted for gay civil marriage in March 2004 and also established jail diversion programs. During her career, she was also attributed with bringing back the Truman Rally, an election eve political rally in West Roxbury. She was also the first state lawmaker to call for Cardinal Bernard Law to step down amid the sexual abuse scandal in the Catholic archdiocese of Boston in 2002. She also pushed for reform of the Big Dig transportation project in Boston.

Walsh was elected to the Massachusetts State Senate in 1992. During her career in the Senate, she served in numerous positions including as Senate Chairman of the Joint Legislative Committees on Taxation and the Committee on Housing and Urban Development. Other departments include Banks and Banking, Ways and Means, Public Service, Education, and Criminal Justice. She was appointed as assistant majority leader in 2003, and again in 2007 for the 2007-2008 legislative term.

== Consultancy ==
Walsh did not run for re-election when her term was up in 2010. She began her own consulting firm and also began teaching at Northeastern University. Part of her consultancy includes the launching of the American Campaign School and Leadership Camp. She also published Run: Your Personal Guide to Winning Public Office, a book about running for office.

== Awards ==
Walsh was named one of Boston's 100 Most Powerful Women by Boston Magazine in 2003. She has also been named Legislator of the Year by various groups including the Environmental League of Massachusetts, the State Police Association, the YMCA, the Alzheimer's Association of Eastern Massachusetts, and the ALS Society of Massachusetts. She was named one of Boston's Ten Most Outstanding Young Leaders by Boston Jaycees in 1990 and was awarded the Massachusetts Women's Political Caucus Abigail Adams Awards Recognition for Service in 2010.
