= Dedham Police Department =

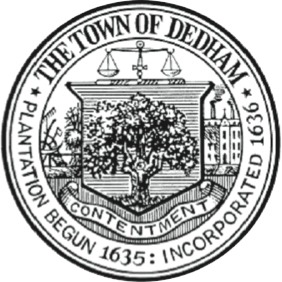
- Seal of Dedham, Massachusetts
- Abbreviation: DPD

Agency overview
- Formed: 1876; 150 years ago
- Annual budget: $7,712,983 (2023)

Jurisdictional structure
- Operations jurisdiction: Massachusetts, USA
- Area: Land Area 10.6 sq mi (27 km^{2})
- Population: 25,364
- Legal jurisdiction: Town of Dedham, Massachusetts
- Governing body: Dedham Select Board
- General nature: Local civilian police

Operational structure
- Headquarters: Dedham, Massachusetts
- Police Officers: 53
- Chief of police responsible: Michael D'Entremont

Website
- Dedham Police

The Dedham Police Department is the municipal police department for the Town of Dedham, Massachusetts. Founded in 1876, it is currently led by Chief Michael D'Entremont and is housed in Dedham's Public Safety Building.

== History ==
=== Early history ===
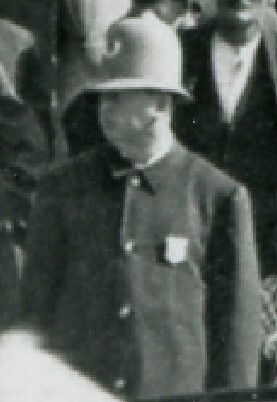
A Dedham police officer on duty in the late 19th century.

The first police officers were appointed in 1876 and worked each day from 4 p.m. to 2 a.m. Officer Philander Young (Note: Police Badge #2) arrested an East Dedham resident that year for clogging on the Sabbath.

After the department purchased its first police motorcycle in 1923, Abe Rafferty was appointed the first motorcycle officer. By 1936, there were 18 officers.

At the dawn of the 20th century, Officer Drugan would meet the last train from Boston at Dedham station, examine the exiting passengers for "suspicious strangers," and then turn out the lights.

=== Horse theft ===
In 1906, a horse was stolen from Scarry's Livery Stable on Eastern Avenue. The alarm was raised, fliers were distributed, and members of The Society in Dedham for Apprehending Horse Thieves set off in motor cars, but they failed to find the stolen horse. While by this time the Town of Dedham had a professional police force who was primarily responsible for tracking down the thief, at one point the chief of police was reporting to the Society.

=== Quincy School ===
The Quincy School was used until 1982 when declining enrollment and Proposition 2½ forced its closure. Town Meeting authorized the sale of the property to a developer in 1982, but only after off-duty police officers and firefighters were able to find and bring enough Town Representatives to reach a quorum.

=== Ruby ===
On January 27, 2020, an English cream retriever began working for the department. The Norfolk County District Attorney's office provided the community resource dog to the Dedham police and three other departments. Students at Dedham Middle School voted to name the dog Ruby.

=== Accreditation ===
The Dedham Police Department was first accredited by the Massachusetts Police Accreditation Commission in 2017. It earned reaccreditation in 2026.

== Headquarters ==
=== Memorial Hall ===
The department was located on the first floor of Memorial Hall until Town Clerk John Carey locked the doors for the last time on March 16, 1962. The building was demolished in April 1962 after a new town hall was built on Bryant St. The police took up temporary residence in the new town hall for a year while a new police station was built on the Memorial Hall property.

=== First station ===
On April 29, 1963, the Police Department moved into their new headquarters on the corner of High and Washington Streets. It included a fallout shelter in the cellar that featured walls of 6-inch reinforced concrete and a lead window cover that could be put in place to shield occupants from fallout resulting from a nuclear explosion. It also housed the Civil Defense Communication Center.

=== Proposed Rustcraft station ===
Town Meeting rejected a $40 million proposal in November 2014 to buy a 490,000 square feet (46,000 m^{2}) portion of the former Rust Craft Greeting Card building at 100 Rustcraft Road for use as a Town Hall, Senior Center, and Police Station. The Town had already spent hundreds of thousands of dollars in due diligence when Town Meeting rejected the plan.

=== Public safety building ===
After most of the Town's administrative offices move into the Ames Schoolhouse, the Police Department was expected to renovate the old Town Hall for their use at a cost of $9.5 million. Plans changed, however, to knocking down the existing Town Hall and instead building a combined public safety building for both the police and the Dedham Fire Department.

On March 5, 2021, a ceremonial groundbreaking took place for the new building. The new building at 26 Bryant Street was opened for the first time on March 12, 2023. The public was invited to take tours following the ribbon cutting. The Dedham Square Planning Committee voted to recommend the old police headquarters be demolished and a new town green be built on the site in December 2021. A six-person working group was created to oversee the project in April 2022.

Inside the statue of William B. Gould are three photos of the ribbon cutting of the Public Safety Building. (Note: The first photo shows Deputy Police Chief Mike Buckley, State Representative Paul McMurtry, Select board member Erin Boles Welch, Select board member Kevin Coughlin, Select board member Dennis Teehan Jr., Select board member Dimitria Sullivan, Joe Albanese from Commodore Builders, retired firefighter John Brown. The second shows retired firefighter John Brown, James MacDonald, Select board member Jim MacDonald, retired Fire Chief Jim Driscoll, retired firefighter Artie Kirohn, retired firefighter Kenny Pike, retired Deputy Fire Chief John Fontaine, retired firefighter Bob Reissfelder, and retired firefighter Al Romanish. The third shows retired Deputy Fire Chief John Fontaine, retired firefighter Bob Reissfelder, retired firefighter Al Romanish, former Select board member Mike Butler, Town Manager Leon Goodwin, Planning board member Jessica Porter, Building, Planning, and Construction Committee chairman Jim Sullivan, Police Chief Mike D’Entremont, Fire Chief Bill Spilanne, Assistant Town Manager Nancy Baker, retired Police Chief Dennis Teehan, Sr., Business Manager for the Police Department Karen Camerano.)

=== Substations ===
There are police substations at NewBridge and at Legacy Place.

== Supernatural investigations ==
=== 1877 spook sightings ===
In October 1877, a "spook" was seen in the Old Village Cemetery. P.H. Hurley was walking through the graveyard when he was accosted by the ghost. The spook then took off, leaping over a tall fence. Later the same night, John Ward saw the spook in Brookdale Cemetery.

The spook seen by Hurley and Ward was described as being over seven feet tall and wearing a long blue coat. Others reported seeing a spectral woman in the cemeteries. She was silent and still, pointing at various graves.

One report indicated that the spook liked eggs, so the police investigated a grocery store.

Around midnight on November 8, neighbors on Village Avenue heard shots fired in the cemetery. Caretaker John Carey found blood scattered on the white marble gravestone of Lavinia Turner the next morning, as well as a bloody handprint on the iron rail surrounding the family plot. There was also trampled grass and indications of a struggle. Constable de Morse thought the red liquid was blood, but Police Chief William F. Drugan ruled that it was simply red ink. Drugan also declared that the "spook sensation" was not real but was the work of pranksters.

The press, including the Dedham Transcript and newspapers from Boston and New York, covered the story extensively. One reporter spent the night in the cemetery, hoping to catch a glimpse of the spook. By the end of November, when a ghost was seen in a Palmer, Massachusetts cemetery and the newspaper coverage moved there, the sightings in Dedham died down.

=== 1973 UFO sighting ===
In December 1973, the Dedham Police Department investigated the sighting of several unidentified flying objects over town. A young couple on a date had their car followed by UFO while they drove through Dedham.

== Youths behaving badly ==
=== Independence Day wagon burnings ===
Beginning in the early 1900s and continuing until the 1990s, bonfires would be held first in Oakdale Square and then in the Manor to celebrate the 4th of July. It would usually begin at midnight, either on July 3 or July 4, when a young person would climb onto the roof of the Church of the Good Shepherd and ring the bell. This would signal others to bring old farm carts they had stolen into Oakdale Square and light them ablaze.

In the early days, through the 1930s, police and fire officials were on hand to keep order and maintain safety. The fires would often grow so large and so intense that windows in the Square would crack and tar would melt. By 1959, the fires had grown so intense that the Town adopted a by-law, perhaps one of a kind, to outlaw the practice.

The last fire in Oakdale Square took place in 1963. When police and the fire department arrived to shut it down, they were pelted with rocks and full cans of beer. Several years later, the tradition was revived in the Manor but, after an explosion and an intense fire melted the siding on a nearby house in 1990, the tradition was finally ended.

=== Dedham High School ===
Dedham High School began playing Norwood High School in an annual football contest in 1920. In 1946, thousands of fans swarmed the field for about 20 minutes after a Norwood touchdown pass was brought back on an offensive interference penalty. During the closing minutes of the game, the crowd threw stones and other objects at the officials. The Dedham Police Department had to escort them off the field after the game.

== The Friends of Eddie Coyle and the Citizen's Bank robbery ==
On December 1, 1972, The Friends of Eddie Coyle crew shot the film's opening scene in Dedham Square. The South Shore Bank (Note: As of 2023, it is a Citizen's Bank.) was used as the bank robbed in the film.

On June 16, 2009, just a few weeks after the movie was rereleased on DVD, the same bank was robbed in a manner reminiscent of how it was done in the film. Delroy George Henry drove up to the bank minutes before it opened. He then forced his way in the bank and tried to get the staff to open the vault. He also ordered staff to sit on the ground while brandishing a gun, just as was done in the film.

An employee sent a text message to an employee in another branch who then called the Dedham Police Department. A police officer working a detail 100 yards away responded quickly and apprehended Henry.

== Chiefs ==
Name	Years of service	Notes
Warren C. Totty	August 12, 1926 -	
Walter Carroll		
William F. Drugan		
Dennis Teehan	1988-2006	(Note: Teehan was the youngest chief in the Department's history when he was appointed at 37 years old.)
Michael Weir	2006-2010	(Note: Weir was in the Guinness Book of World Records for throwing a grape the longest distance into the mouth of another person.)
Michael d'Entremont	2010-present	

== Works cited ==
- Dedham Historical Society (2001). Images of America: Dedham. Arcadia Publishing. ISBN 978-0-7385-0944-0.
- Hanson, Robert Brand (1976). Dedham, Massachusetts, 1635-1890. Dedham Historical Society.
- Parr, James L. (2009). Dedham: Historic and Heroic Tales From Shiretown. The History Press. ISBN 978-1-59629-750-0.
