= Charles M. McGowan =

American politician

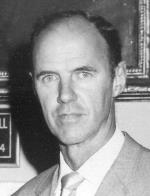

Member of the Massachusetts House of Representatives
- In office 1967–1978

Charles M. McGowan (November 13, 1923 – May 26, 2013) was an American businessman and politician. Born in Boston, Massachusetts, McGowan served in the United States Army during World War II. He received his bachelor's and master's degrees from Framingham State University and was a real estate appraiser and broker. He served on the Dedham, Massachusetts Board of Selectmen and was chairman. In this capacity he served on the Blue Ribbon Commission honoring John Andrew Barnes, III, the Congressional Medal of Honor recipient.

He then served in the Massachusetts House of Representatives 1967–1978 as a Democrat. He then served as sergeant at arms for the Massachusetts House of Representatives 1978–1988. He died in Dedham, Massachusetts.
