= Katherine Endicott =

American philanthropist

Katherine Farwell Endicott (née Colburn; May 20, 1882 – March 25, 1967) was an American philanthropist, best remembered today for giving the Endicott Estate to the Town of Dedham, Massachusetts.

Endicott was born in Norwood, Massachusetts, to Isaac Colburn and Louise Clapp Colburn. She was adopted by her stepfather, Henry Bradford Endicott.

She was frequently in the society page of the newspaper for her social and charitable activities. She was a client of Valentina, and named one of the best dressed women in America and the best dressed in Boston. Towards the end of her life she lived on the Estate with a staff of 12.

She died in Boston in 1967.
