= Robert Cawley =

American politician (1934–2004)

Member of the Massachusetts Senate from the 5th Suffolk District
- In office 1968–1972
- Preceded by: Stephen Davenport
- Succeeded by: Arthur Joseph Lewis Jr.

Member of the Massachusetts House of Representatives from West Roxbury
- In office 1962–1968

Personal details
- Born: July 30, 1934
- Died: April 30, 2004 (aged 69)
- Party: Democratic
- Spouse: Patricia A. O'Sullivan
- Children: 4
- Education: Boston College (B.S., B.A.); Northeastern University (M.A.)
- Occupation: College professor
- Awards: Purple Heart

Military service
- Allegiance: United States
- Branch/service: United States Marine Corps
- Unit: 1st Marine Division
- Battles/wars: Korean War

Robert Lucian Cawley (July 30, 1934 – April 30, 2004) was a Democratic politician from Massachusetts who served as a member of the Massachusetts House of Representatives from 1962 to 1968, and as a member of the Massachusetts Senate from 1968 to 1972. He unsuccessfully ran for the U.S. House of Representatives in 1972 from the 9th district, but lost in the Democratic primary. He died on April 30, 2004.
