= Maryanne Lewis =

American politician

- A portrait of Maryanne Lewis

Member of the Massachusetts House of Representatives for the 11th Norfolk District
- In office 1995–2003
- Preceded by: Marie-Louise Kehoe
- Succeeded by: Robert K. Coughlin

Personal details
- Born: June 1, 1963 (age 63) Boston, Massachusetts
- Party: Democratic (before 2010); Independent (2010-Present)
- Spouse: Brian Kearney
- Education: Trinity College and Catholic University of America Columbus School of Law

Maryanne Lewis (born June 1, 1963) is an American businesswoman and former Massachusetts State Representative. In 2010, she ran unsuccessfully as an independent candidate for the US House of Representatives from the Massachusetts 10th district.

== Biography ==
=== Early life ===
Maryanne Lewis grew up in a family of six in Dedham, Massachusetts. She graduated from Dedham High School. As a child, she was among the first visitors to the Dedham Public Library's Endicott Branch on the day it opened.

Lewis received her B.A. from Trinity College in Washington D.C. She then went on to earn her Juris Doctor Degree from The Catholic University of America Columbus School of Law. While attending law school, she was a staff assistant to then Speaker of the House, Thomas P. Tip O'Neill.

When she returned to Massachusetts, Lewis served as an Assistant District Attorney in Suffolk County, Massachusetts. After her tenure at the District Attorney's office she went into private law practice.

=== Political career ===
In 1995, Lewis was elected to the Massachusetts House of Representatives for the 11th Norfolk District. She served four terms in the Massachusetts State Legislature (1995–2003). As a Representative, during the late 1990s, Maryanne Lewis, a top deputy of House Speaker Thomas Finneran often presided during House sessions, assisting Speaker Finneran, during his long run as "one of the Hill's most influential figures".

After her defeat in the 2002 Democratic primary, Lewis left the State Legislature.

She was named the Congressional Legislative Director for the National Association of Government Employees (NAGE) in 2003. Maryanne Lewis currently runs her own independent consulting firm. In 2011 she was elected to a five-year term on the Scituate Housing Authority.

=== 2010 Congressional Campaign ===
In August, 2010, Lewis announced her candidacy for the 10th Congressional district of Massachusetts, an area running from Quincy, Massachusetts down to Cape Cod and the Islands. Lewis collected over 4,000 signatures to be included on the November 2nd ballot as an Independent. She was the only woman running in the 10th District Congressional race.

Lewis ran as a self-proclaimed conservative running on a platform of economic recovery through job creation and fiscal responsibility, immigration reform, 2nd Amendment protection, coastal protection, and reducing energy dependence. She lost the race to Bill Keating, District Attorney of Norfolk County, Massachusetts, 5.9% to 46.9%.

Lewis has not stood for election in Massachusetts since 2010.

== Personal life ==
In 2010, Lewis and her husband Brian Kearney lived in Scituate, Massachusetts, with their two sons Patrick and Matthew. At that time, both boys attended Boston College High School in Dorchester. In 2019, Patrick was elected to a seat in the Massachusetts House.

=== Political accomplishments and awards ===
Maryanne Lewis was awarded the following distinctions while in office:

- Legislator of the Year – 2000, awarded by Jobs for Youth.
- Legislator of the Year – 2001, awarded by Massachusetts Bar Association.
- Legislator of the Year – 2002, awarded by the Massachusetts Police Association.
- Legislator of the Year - 2002, awarded by the Massachusetts Childcare Association.
- "The Maryanne Lewis Playground" was dedicated in recognition of Maryanne's efforts on behalf of recreational space.
