= Francis Appleton Harding =

American politician (1908–1989)

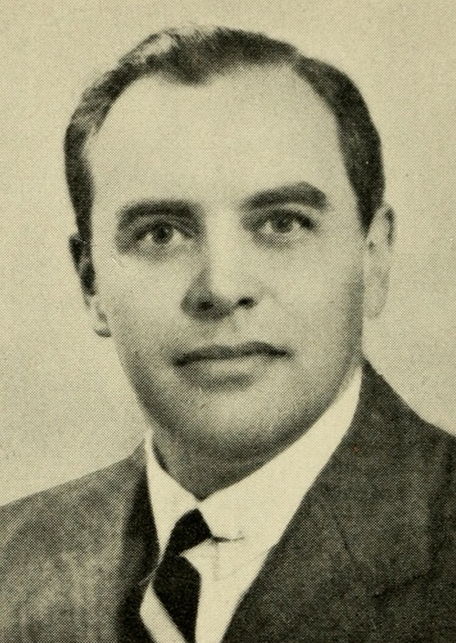
Portrait of Francis Appleton Harding

Francis Appleton Harding (March 21, 1908 – November 23, 1989) was an American politician in Massachusetts. He represented Dedham in the Massachusetts House of Representatives from 1947 to 1955.

Harding was born in Dedham and attended St. Mark's School and Harvard University. Before becoming a politician he made his living as a writer. Harding was a member of the Rotary Club, the American Legion, and the Veterans of Foreign Wars.

== See also ==
- Massachusetts legislature: 1947–1948, 1949–1950, 1951–1952, 1953–1954, 1955–1956
