= William G. Moseley (Massachusetts politician) =

American politician

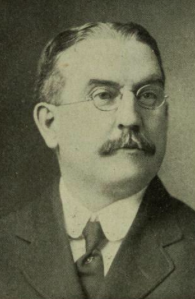
William G. Moseley (1910)

William G. Moseley served in the Massachusetts House of Representatives in the early 1900s. He was from Needham, Massachusetts.
