= Endicott Estate =

Historic house in Massachusetts, United States

- U.S. National Register of Historic Places
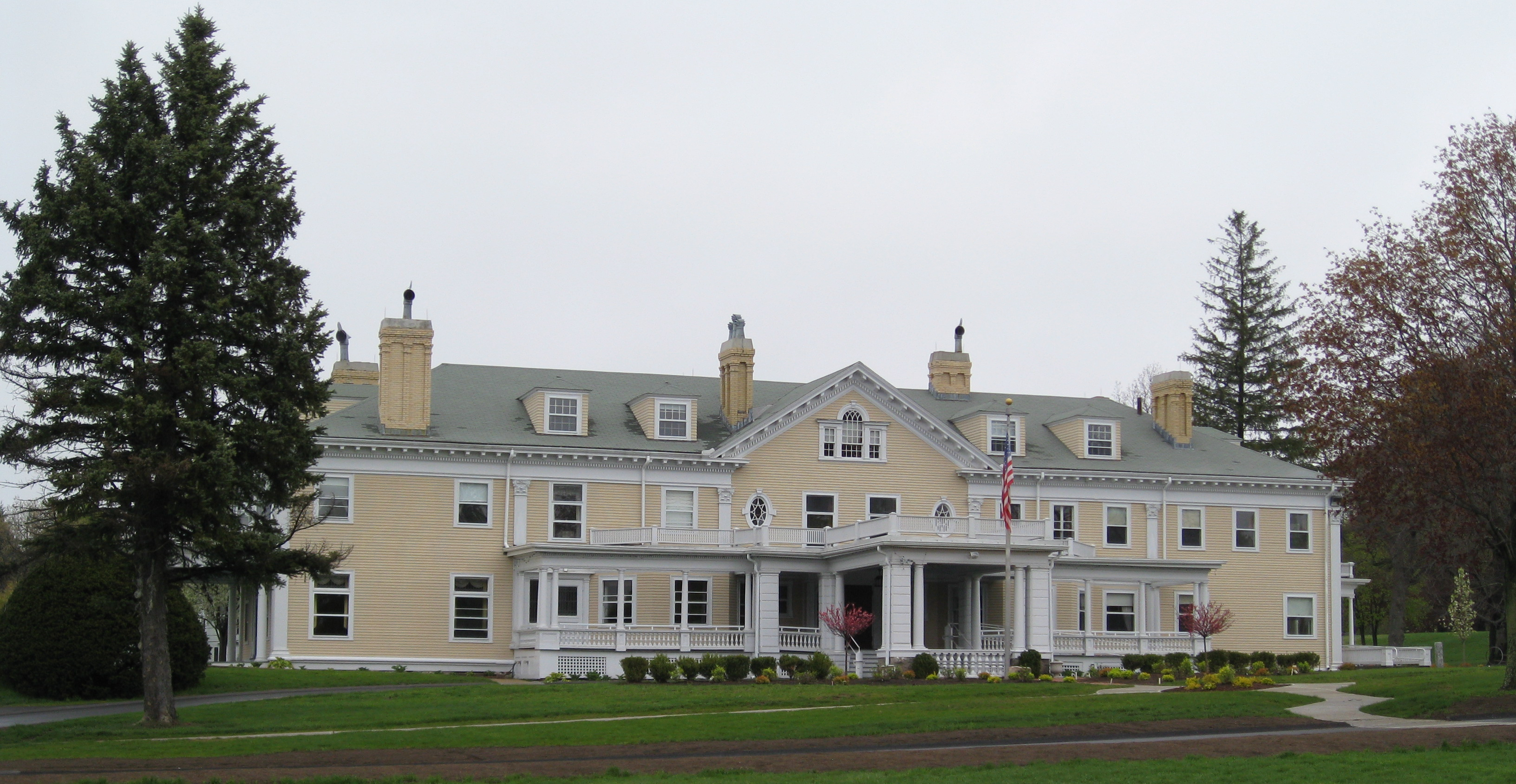

- Location within Massachusetts Location within the United States
- Location: 656 East Street, Dedham, Massachusetts
- Coordinates: 42°14′29″N 71°9′48″W
- Built: 1904
- Architect: Henry Bailey Alden
- NRHP reference No.: 02000128
- Added to NRHP: March 6, 2002

The Endicott Estate is a mansion built in the early twentieth century, located at 656 East Street in Dedham, Massachusetts “situated on a 15-acre panorama of lush green lawn that is punctuated by stately elm, spruce and weeping willow trees.” It was built by Henry Bradford Endicott, founder of the Endicott Johnson Corporation, and donated to the Town by his adopted stepdaughter, Katherine. After she died it was briefly owned by the state and intended to be used as the official residence of the Governor of Massachusetts, but was quickly returned to the Town. Today it is used for a variety of civic events and is rented out for private parties.

== Construction ==
On January 12, 1904, Henry Endicott's home burnt to the ground while he and his family were away. The fire department was not able to get to the estate in time as they were dealing with three other fires simultaneously, including one at the fire house, and deep snow. The fire was discovered around 10 p.m. by a caretaker who lived in the house. It took several hours to extinguish the flames. The house and furnishings were valued at more than $15,000.

It is said that "Henry took the burning of the homestead as a divine command to rebuild, and rebuild he did, although not without incident.” He cleared the ashes away and built a new homestead on the 15-acre (61,000 m^{2}) parcel, today known as the Endicott Estate, and bought a new fire truck for the Town.

The three-story house he constructed has nine bathrooms, eight bedrooms, a library, a music room, a ballroom, a mirrored parlor, a butler's kitchen, a linen room, and servants' quarters. When a radiator burst during the construction, "causing a raging river to crash down the main stairway," he tore down one end of the house and burned a pile of beautiful wall paneling, parquet floors, and elegant woodwork, much to the dismay of his neighbors. An additional 70' was then added onto the house. Construction cost $60,000. A gardener's cottage was built across the street at 132 Sanderson St.

When complete, it included "carved moldings that couldn't be reproduced at any cost," large all marble bathrooms, "intricate wall sconces," and a pipe organ. Katherine would never allow a tree, no matter how old, to be cut down.

== Donation to Dedham ==
When he died in 1920 he left the building to his wife, who in turn left it to her daughter Katherine in 1944. In 1955, Katherine wrote a letter to the Board of Selectmen, indicating that she intended to leave the house and grounds, then-valued at $600,000, to the Town when she died. At the time, it was speculated that it may become the site of a new high school, swimming pool, and town hall.

Katherine, who lived with a staff of 12 on the Estate, died in 1967 without any children and willed the land and the estate to the town for "public educational purposes, public recreational purposes, or other exclusively public purposes." At the time the "town didn't know quite what to do with it," leaving them with "a most pleasant problem." The several schools that were in need of construction in 1955 had already been built by this point.

== Governor's mansion ==
Not knowing what else to do, Town Meeting voted to offer it to the Commonwealth of Massachusetts to be used as the Massachusetts Governor's Mansion after going to Probate Court to change the terms of the will. The state agreed to pay $160,000, plus $20,000 a year to partially recoup the taxes that would be lost on it. The year before Katherine died, taxes were $50,000.

The effort to purchase the Estate was a bipartisan effort, with Dedham's Republican representative, Harold Rosen, and Boston's Gerald Morissey, a Democrat, filing the legislation to take the Estate. The chairmen of both state parties issued statements supporting the purchase. Governor John Volpe took the title to the 25 room estate, which became his first choice after touring it in May, in a ceremony on December 7, 1967. The public was invited to attend a reception where Volpe's wife, Jennie, chatted with residents. Locals believed the town would become "the second capital" of Massachusetts. The Volpes sold their home in Winchester, Massachusetts in early-1968.

Renovations to the house were needed, which was described as "a mixture of elegance and impracticality" for the beautiful construction but lack of dishwasher, garbage disposal, and electric wiring that could not handle air conditioning. It was said that it was a "sprawling, fascinating house that needs a lot of the most careful kind of renovation." A five-member commission (Note: Including businessman C. Robert Yeager, who served as Chairman, Superintendent of State Buildings, Daniel W. Warren, past president of the New England Park Association, Mrs. Edward P. Starter, who lived in Dedham and was president of the New England chapter of the American Institute of Interior Designers, and Bradford M. Endicott, a relative of Katherine's.) was created to oversee the work, and William G. Perry of Perry, Dean, Hepburn & Stewart was hired to develop the plans.

Original estimates ran around $100,000, and the commission asked for an initial $300,000 appropriation to "convert it from a home to a spacious place for the state to entertain." The kitchen was to be updated, and the dining room expanded to seat at least 60 people, much more than the original 16. The commission planned to install air conditioning and to furnish and decorate the home with historic pieces from the Museum of Fine Arts and other wealthy citizens. While the home had multiple bathrooms, it only had one shower, a "a cocoon-like metal contraption that sprays water from all directions" with undependable water temperature.

Parking for 100 cars was planned, a helicopter landing pad was also discussed, as was a gym and swimming pool. The caretaker's home was to be converted into a permanent residence for five or six Massachusetts state troopers who would provide security. An additional staff of five to 12 people, possibly inmates from state prisons, to run the house was considered. A fence and additional landscaping was also planned. Plans alone cost $20,000.

Jennie Volpe, who was made an honorary commission member to provide "realistic advice," wanted an upstairs work room so that her husband would not disturb her while she was in bed, as well as a chapel. It soon became apparent that it would be cheaper to build a brand new mansion than to remodel the estate to Jennie Volpe's "lavish taste" and "crazy notions," including ripping out the "incomparable mahogany and sycamore wood paneling" and replacing it with pastel plaster. The Massachusetts General Court denied a request for an additional $385,000.

By May 1968, cost estimates ran as high as $1 million, and the Commonwealth gave the Estate back to the Town in 1969. In his inaugural address, new Governor Francis W. Sargent said "Massachusetts, in 1969, cannot afford the luxury of a million dollar Governor's Mansion."

== Modern usage ==
The Endicott Estate is now used to host a multitude of events, both formal and informal. This ranges from “weddings, receptions, and cocktail parties, to business meetings, art shows and more”, such as the Annual BSAAC Antique Car Show, Car Corral & Trading Bee Family Fun Day. The mansion's main floor houses a Grand Ballroom, which is “framed by Ionic columns and duel balustrades, adds a classical touch to holiday parties, art shows, concerts and seminars.” The lower level of the structure is complete with a library, dining room, mirrored parlor, music room, as well as a fully functional kitchen. There are also six rooms on the upper level, which are mostly used for workshops and business meetings.

The house was added to the National Register of Historic Places in 2002. What was a nine car garage on the Mt. Vernon Street side of the property today serves as the Endicott branch of the Dedham Public Library. A fire destroyed the barn, which was built in 1932, in the early morning hours of November 16, 2019.

A fundraising group, the Friends of the Endicott Estate, was founded by Virginia Schortmann. Another organization, the Katherine Endicott Foundation, was founded in the 2000s.

== See also ==
- National Register of Historic Places listings in Norfolk County, Massachusetts
