= History of Dedham, Massachusetts, 2000–present =

The history of Dedham, Massachusetts from 2000 to present includes several large commercial and residential developments, the Town's 375th anniversary, municipal building projects, and changes to the Charter.

== Development ==
Major developments in Dedham include the Jewish Rashi School, a $30 million building on the 162-acre campus of Hebrew SeniorLife's NewBridge on the Charles in the fall of 2010. The 82,000-square-foot LEED-certified school opened in the fall of 2010 with 300 students in kindergarten through eighth grade and room to grow the population. The first of the 700 residents of NewBridge on the Charles moved in on June 1, 2010.

After Legacy Place, a shopping mall with 80 stores, restaurants, and a 15-screen movie theater opened, businesses in Dedham Square suffered. Legacy Place opened in 2009, with the first movie being shown to the public on August 27, 2009. The first film was Inglourious Basterds, and the first preview was for Shutter Island, a movie partially filmed in Dedham.

In the early years of the century, the 103' water pipe that stood on Walnut Street across from Oakdale Avenue was torn down to make room for a new house. At the time, it was the oldest steel water tank in the country, having stood since 1881.

== Municipal building projects ==
=== Town Hall and Senior Center ===
Town Meeting rejected a $40 million proposal in November 2014 to buy a 490,000 square feet (46,000 m^{2}) portion of the former Rust Craft Greeting Card building at 100 Rustcraft Road for use as a Town Hall, Senior Center, and Police Station. The Town had already spent hundreds of thousands of dollars in due diligence when Town Meeting rejected the plan.

At the 2014 Annual Town Meeting it was voted instead to purchase the 33,000 square feet (3,100 m^{2}) Ames Schoolhouse for $5.85 million and renovate it to be used as a Town Hall and Senior Center. An additional $1 million was appropriated to relocate the tenants of the schoolhouse, which was listed on the National Register of Historic Places in 1983. Town Meeting Representatives and other supporters of a Senior Center, a building discussed and debated for more than 30 years, "wooed and applauded loudly," and were dancing in the aisles after the article passed.

The price to renovate the building ballooned from $10.6 million to $14.1 million after a more thorough inspection of the building was conducted. (Note: Price listed as $14,527,544 one week later in the October 19, 2015 edition of the Dedham Times.) On June 19 and 20, 2020, most departments moved from the old town hall into the Ames Schoolhouse.

=== Public safety building ===
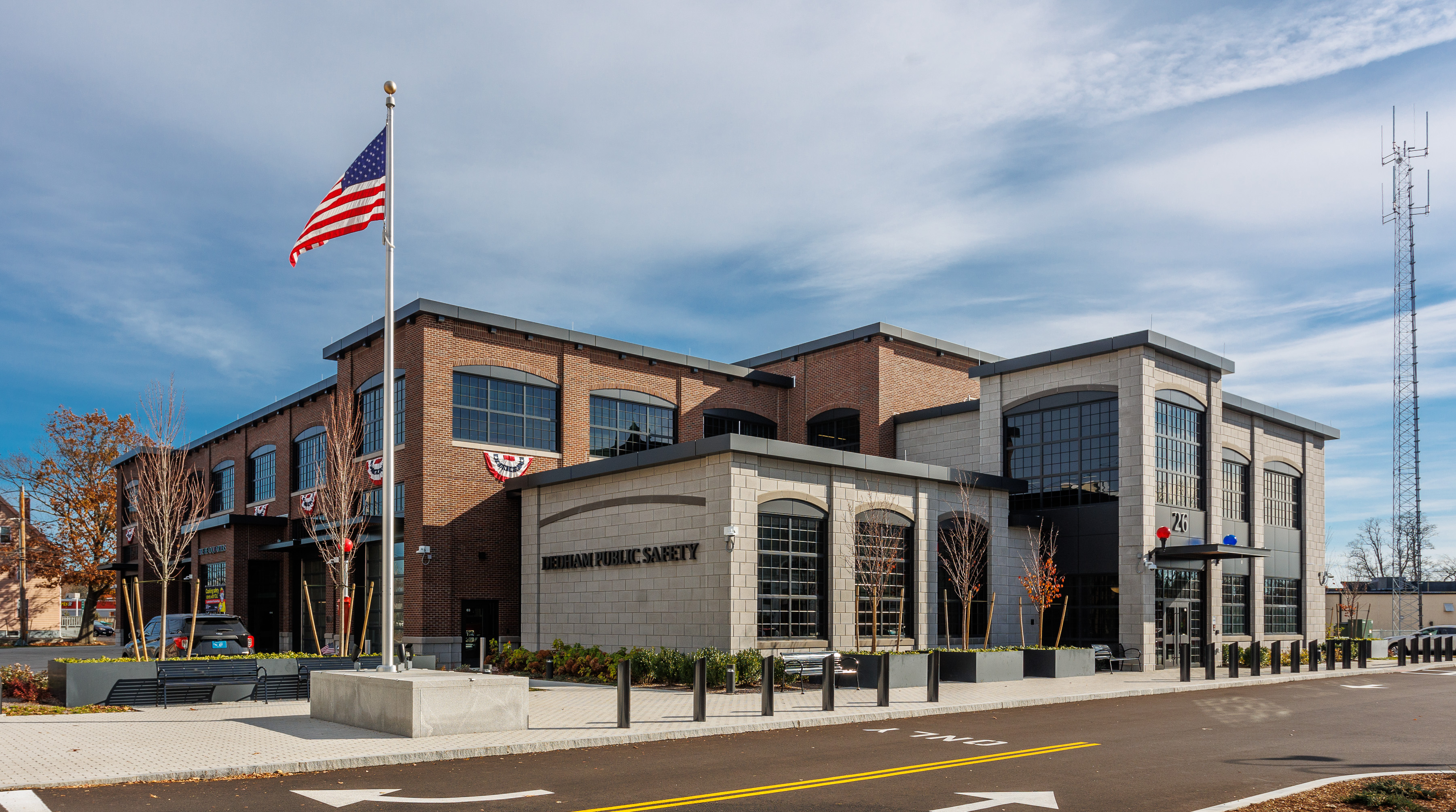
Dedham Public Safety complex

After most of the Town's administrative offices move into the Ames Schoolhouse, the Police Department was expected to renovate the old Town Hall for their use at a cost of $9.5 million. Plans changed, however, to knocking down the existing Town Hall and instead building a combined public safety building for both the police and fire departments.

On March 5, 2021, a ceremonial groundbreaking took place for the new building. The new building at 26 Bryant Street was opened for the first time on March 12, 2023. The public was invited to take tours following the ribbon cutting.

=== William B. Gould statue ===
On November 9, 2020, the Town of Dedham renamed a 1.3 acre park as the William B. Gould Memorial Park. The park was formally dedicated on September 23, 2021, before a crowd of more than 100. The park on Mother Brook is about .5 miles from Gould's home on Milton Street. A committee was established to erect a sculpture of him on the site by Memorial Day 2023, the 100th anniversary of Gould's death. The names of four finalists, all artists of color, were announced at the dedication.

On May 28, 2023, the statue was unveiled before a crowd of hundreds by Timothy, Alina, and William B. Gould VI, three of Gould's great-great-great-grandchildren. There ceremony took place a few days after the 100th anniversary of Gould's death. The statue portrays Gould as an older man, as he would have been known to the people of Dedham. His hands are slightly enlarged and his posture is slightly stiff, demonstrating that he worked hard jobs his entire life. It includes the coat he wore as Commander of the Carrol Post of the Grand Army of the Republic, and a toolbox with symbolic tools he used in his life such as a compass, a trowel, and a pen. A copy of his diary sits open on his lap.

=== Town Green ===
Following the construction of the new Public Safety Building,the Dedham Square Planning Committee voted to recommend the old police headquarters be demolished and a new town green be built on the site in December 2021. A six-person working group was created to oversee the project in April 2022. A groundbreaking ceremony for the Town Green was held on May 16, 2024. The Green was officially opened with a ribbon cutting ceremony on April 30, 2025.

== Government ==
=== Charter changes ===
In March 2012 the Board of Selectmen created a Charter Advisory Committee to review the Town's governing document and to recommend changes. The committee consisted of Thomas R. Polito Jr., Joseph Pascarella, Kevin Mawe, Jay Donahue, Brian Keaney, Cherylann Sheehan, and Camille Zahka, and met more than 25 times before presenting their findings to the Selectmen in August 2013. The Selectmen sent the recommendations on to Town Meeting, who presented them to Town Meeting. The Town Meeting approved all but one, calling for term limits. At the 2014 Town Election, voters approved five of the six amendments, with the only exception being an increase in the term of the Town Clerk from three to five years.

In 2020 a new Charter Committee was appointed. It included Chairman Carmen Dello Iacono, Michelle Apuzzio, Gemma Martin, Andrew Haley, Lance Hartford, Michele Heffernan, and Tom Ryan.

=== Pandemic-era town meetings ===
Town Meeting was altered several times during the COVID-19 pandemic.

In the fall of 2020, Town Meeting was held over Zoom. Due to technological glitches, power outages in some parts of town as a result of a storm, and running a meeting of nearly 300 people plus other officials, it did not finish until after midnight the next day. A team of more than 20 people worked weekly since the previous August to iron out the issues related to the first ever virtual town meeting.

In May 2021, it was held outdoors at Stone Park. In November 2021, town meeting was held on the tennis courts at the Dedham Health and Athletic Complex, a space large enough for everyone to be indoors while still social distancing. The owners, Lloyd and Roberta Gainsboro, were given a plaque thanking them for shutting down their tennis courts for the evening and hosting the first ever town meeting held "in a building that's big enough to park airplanes in."

=== Select Board elections ===
==== 2024 ====
One seat for a three-year term available.

SELECT BOARD	Precinct 1	Precinct 2	Precinct 3	Precinct 4	Precinct 5	Precinct 6	Precinct 7	TOTAL	%
Blanks	59	43	30	54	38	51	94	369	8.0%
JAMES A. MACDONALD	417	411	240	372	444	449	481	2814	61.2%
JASON P. BROGAN	70	204	126	187	283	202	336	1408	30.6%
Write-ins	0	1	1	4	0	2	0	8	0.2%
TOTAL	546	659	397	617	765	704	911	4599	

==== 2023 ====
Two seats for three year terms available.

SELECT BOARD	Precinct 1	Precinct 2	Precinct 3	Precinct 4	Precinct 5	Precinct 6	Precinct 7	TOTAL	%
Blanks	187	266	190	276	317	286	360	1882	20.3%
DENNIS J. TEEHAN	550	443	295	421	469	541	566	3285	35.4%
JOSHUA DONATI	506	298	193	332	339	447	370	2485	26.7%
LISA JEAN DESMOND	98	237	170	242	295	234	351	1627	17.5%
Write-ins	1	2	0	3	4	2	1	13	0.1%
TOTAL	1342	1246	848	1274	1424	1510	1648	9292	

==== 2022 ====
Two seats for three year terms available.

SELECT BOARD	Pct.1	Pct.2	Pct.3	Pct.4	Pct.5	Pct.6	Pct.7	TOTAL	%
Blanks	191	247	199	225	339	310	370	1881	20.5%
CHERYL S. SULLIVAN	42	65	36	50	85	64	74	416	4.5%
ERIN BOLES WELSH	430	276	191	316	350	453	385	2401	26.1%
DIMITRIA SULLIVAN	399	465	258	344	422	470	503	2861	31.1%
JASON P. BROGAN	90	180	193	230	320	233	379	1625	17.7%
Write-ins	0	1	3	1	2	2	3	12	0.1%
TOTAL	1152	1234	880	1166	1518	1532	1714	9196	

==== 2021 ====
One seat for a full three-year term available.

SELECT BOARD	Pct.1	Pct.2	Pct.3	Pct.4	Pct.5	Pct.6	Pct.7	TOTAL
Blanks	190	162	132	233	260	273	243	1493
JAMES A. MACDONALD	332	337	275	341	470	446	436	2637
Write-ins	4	9	6	5	6	7	6	43
TOTAL	526	508	413	579	736	726	685	4173

==== 2020 ====
Two seats for three year terms available.

SELECTMEN	Pct.1	Pct.2	Pct.3	Pct.4	Pct.5	Pct.6	Pct.7	TOTAL
Blanks	524	465	377	508	626	675	529	3704
KEVIN R. COUGHLIN	336	487	388	452	604	668	604	3539
DENNIS J. TEEHAN, JR.	447	513	403	500	621	660	634	3808
WILLIAM J. RALPH	132	176	151	188	224	269	261	1401
PAUL REYNOLDS (Write-in)	91	15	18	36	44	75	17	296
Write-ins	2	6	9	16	11	15	3	62
TOTAL	1562	1662	1346	1700	2130	2362	2048	12810

==== 2019 ====
Two seats for three year terms available.

SELECTMEN	Pct.1	Pct.2	Pct.3	Pct.4	Pct.5	Pct.6	Pct.7	TOTAL	Pct
Blanks	319	226	139	215	253	300	242	1694	19.3%
SARAH MACDONALD	530	275	166	347	390	412	288	2408	27.4%
CARMEN E. DELLO IACONO, JR.	70	131	131	197	230	201	249	1209	13.8%
WILLIAM J. RALPH	77	136	134	169	172	200	207	1095	12.5%
DIMITRIA SULLIVAN	303	414	206	281	372	422	361	2359	26.9%
Write-ins	1	2	2	1	3	5	1	15	0.2%
TOTAL	1300	1184	778	1210	1420	1540	1348	8780	

==== 2018 ====
One seat for a full three-year term available.

SELECTMEN	Pct.1	Pct.2	Pct.3	Pct.4	Pct.5	Pct.6	Pct.7	TOTAL
Blanks	97	66	66	89	81	101	77	577
JAMES A. MACDONALD	575	450	257	386	445	461	464	3038
WILLIAM J. RALPH	144	164	199	247	265	306	279	1604
Write-ins	16	4	8	7	9	26	12	82
TOTAL	1120	1032	876	1008	1196	1360	1242	7834

==== 2017 ====
Two seats for three year terms available.

SELECTMEN	Pct.1	Pct.2	Pct.3	Pct.4	Pct.5	Pct.6	Pct.7	TOTAL
Blanks	436	367	323	385	380	495	428	2814
DENNIS J. GUILFOYLE	331	338	301	304	434	438	426	2572
DENNIS J. TEEHAN, JR.	337	323	244	312	373	401	376	2366
Write-ins	16	4	8	7	9	26	12	82
TOTAL	1120	1032	876	1008	1196	1360	1242	7834

==== 2016 ====
Two seats for three year terms available.

SELECTMEN	Pct.1	Pct.2	Pct.3	Pct.4	Pct.5	Pct.6	Pct.7	TOTAL
Blanks	211	132	75	125	132	158	139	972
THOMAS M. BONCEK	54	42	32	47	66	72	74	387
BRENDAN KEOGH	212	274	137	200	211	250	253	1537
MICHAEL L. BUTLER	199	173	117	162	172	272	182	1277
Write-ins	2	1	1	0	3	2	2	11
TOTAL	678	622	362	534	584	754	650	4184

==== 2015 ====
One seat for a full three-year term available.

SELECTMEN 3yr	Pct.1	Pct.2	Pct.3	Pct.4	Pct.5	Pct.6	Pct.7	TOTAL	TOTAL
Blanks	149	136	90	109	134	140	167	925	35.81%
JAMES A. MACDONALD	220	267	157	198	275	272	254	1,643	63.61%
Write-ins	3	1	0	1	3	5	2	15	0.58%
TOTAL	372	404	247	308	412	417	423	2,583	

A separate election was called for when Carmen Dello Iacono stepped down as Selectman to becoming the Town's electrical inspector.

SELECTMEN 1yr	Pct.1	Pct.2	Pct.3	Pct.4	Pct.5	Pct.6	Pct.7	TOTAL	TOTAL
Blanks	14	7	15	8	17	17	10	88	3.41%
STEPHEN M. BILAFER	210	89	66	104	114	171	157	911	35.27%
BRENDAN KEOGH	146	308	166	193	278	227	255	1,573	60.90%
Write-ins	2	0	0	3	3	2	1	11	0.43%
TOTAL	372	404	247	308	412	417	423	2,583	

==== 2014 ====
Two seats for full three year terms were available.

SELECTMEN	Pct.1	Pct.2	Pct.3	Pct.4	Pct.5	Pct.6	Pct.7	TOTAL	Pct
Blanks	183	215	170	139	226	217	245	1395	15.2%
BRENDAN KEOGH	167	422	97	188	221	198	176	1469	16.0%
MARY E. GILBERT	375	88	75	124	129	151	112	1054	11.5%
DENNIS J. TEEHAN, JR	295	196	163	261	289	292	301	1797	19.5%
CHERYL A. SCHOENFELD	186	104	130	97	157	167	264	1105	12.0%
KENNETH P. GILCHRIST	8	23	47	15	19	31	15	158	1.7%
DENNIS J. GUILFOYLE	88	236	298	220	409	330	318	1899	20.7%
DANIEL JON O'NEIL, JR	19	32	33	16	36	39	26	201	2.2%
THOMAS M. BONCEK	13	10	23	12	17	18	12	105	1.1%
WRITE-INS	2	0	2	0	3	1	1	9	0.1%
TOTAL	1336	1326	1038	1072	1506	1444	1470	9192	

==== 2013 ====
Two seats for full three year terms were available.

SELECTMEN	Pct.1	Pct.2	Pct.3	Pct.4	Pct.5	Pct.6	Pct.7	TOTAL
Blanks	277	170	173	191	288	310	286	1695
CARMEN E. DELLOIACONO, JR.	232	179	154	231	256	292	286	1630
MICHAEL L. BUTLER	247	165	134	204	246	287	270	1553
Write-ins	2	4	1	2	6	5	6	26
TOTAL	758	518	462	628	796	894	848	4904

==== 2012 ====
One seat for a full three-year term available.

SELECTMEN	Pct. 1	Pct. 2	Pct. 3	Pct. 4	Pct. 5	Pct. 6	Pct. 7	TOTAL	Pct
Blanks	137	58	61	93	83	116	65	613	32.1%
JAMES A. MACDONALD	182	163	151	152	180	240	203	1271	66.6%
Miscellaneous Write-ins	2	1	0	4	5	6	6	24	1.3%
TOTAL	321	222	212	249	268	362	274	1908	

==== 2011 ====
Two seats for full three year terms were available.

SELECTMEN	Pct.1	Pct.2	Pct.3	Pct.4	Pct.5	Pct.6	Pct.7	TOTAL	PCT
Blanks	107	128	105	192	122	150	146	950	14.3%
ROBERT B. O'CONNELL	25	59	66	141	88	62	82	523	7.9%
SARAH MACDONALD	407	216	140	389	233	223	270	1,878	28.3%
GEORGE PANAGOPOULOS	224	127	98	200	158	128	220	1,155	17.4%
PAUL REYNOLDS	341	220	147	418	200	255	267	1,848	27.9%
SABINO J. CELATA	24	46	30	46	36	42	44	268	4.0%
Miscellaneous Write-ins	0	0	0	2	1	0	1	4	0.1%
TOTAL	1,128	796	586	1,388	838	860	1,030	6,626	100.0%

==== 2010 ====
Two seats for full three year terms were available.

SELECTMEN	Pct.1	Pct.2	Pct.3	Pct.4	Pct.5	Pct.6	Pct.7	TOTAL	PCT
Blanks	253	133	139	210	151	141	158	1,185	18.7%
CARMEN E. DELLOIACONO, JR.	178	216	186	324	215	224	269	1,612	25.5%
MICHAEL L. BUTLER	302	196	140	379	167	199	245	1,628	25.7%
ROBERT W. DESMOND	69	74	58	127	100	65	97	590	9.3%
DEREK J. MOULTON	180	150	237	224	150	165	197	1,303	20.6%
Miscellaneous Write-ins	2	1	0	2	1	0	2	8	0.1%
TOTAL	984	770	760	1266	784	794	968	6,326	1

==== 2009 ====
One seat for a full three-year term was available.

SELECTMEN	Pct.1	Pct.2	Pct.3	Pct.4	Pct.5	Pct.6	Pct.7	TOTAL	%
Blanks	55	29	35	82	44	56	66	367	11.4%
SABINO J. CELATA	51	80	72	152	112	109	151	727	22.6%
JAMES A. MACDONALD	280	267	217	449	293	271	331	2108	65.5%
Miscellaneous Write-ins	2	3	0	5	1	1	3	15	0.5%
TOTAL	388	379	324	688	450	437	551	3217	

==== 2008 ====
Two seats for full three year terms were available.

SELECTMEN	Pct.1	Pct.2	Pct.3	Pct.4	Pct.5	Pct.6	Pct.7	TOTAL	%
Blanks	158	232	198	327	263	227	248	1653	16%
SARAH MACDONALD	571	319	237	573	348	394	465	2907	28%
THOMAS R. POLITO, JR.	135	264	212	404	303	279	306	1903	19%
RUSSELL W. POOLE	54	102	43	56	75	46	60	436	4%
PAUL REYNOLDS	617	371	272	660	424	475	482	3301	32%
Miscellaneous Write-ins	1	0	0	2	3	1	3	10	0%
TOTAL	1536	1288	962	2022	1416	1422	1564	10210	100%

==== 2007 ====
Two seats for full three year terms were available.

SELECTMEN	Pct.1	Pct.2	Pct.3	Pct.4	Pct.5	Pct.6	Pct.7	TOTAL	%
Blanks	165	179	144	308	163	229	217	1405	19.6%
STEPHEN B. MACAUSLAND	101	41	22	61	51	46	70	392	5.5%
MICHAEL L. BUTLER	332	226	167	519	283	309	355	2191	30.6%
CARMEN E. DELLOIACONO, JR.	165	211	194	327	243	283	258	1681	23.5%
THOMAS R. POLITO, JR.	109	225	151	344	189	195	261	1474	20.6%
Miscellaneous Write-ins	0	0	2	11	1	2	1	17	0.2%
TOTAL	872	882	680	1570	930	1064	1162	7160	

=== Representation in the General Court ===
Year	Representative	Senator
2000	Maryanne Lewis	Marian Walsh
2001	Maryanne Lewis	Marian Walsh
2002	Maryanne Lewis	Marian Walsh
2003	Maryanne Lewis	Marian Walsh
2004	Bob Coughlin	Marian Walsh
2005	Bob Coughlin	Marian Walsh
2006	Bob Coughlin	Marian Walsh
2007	Bob Coughlin	Marian Walsh
2008	Paul McMurtry	Marian Walsh
2009	Paul McMurtry	Marian Walsh
2010	Paul McMurtry	Marian Walsh
2011	Paul McMurtry	Mike Rush
2012	Paul McMurtry	Mike Rush
2013	Paul McMurtry	Mike Rush
2014	Paul McMurtry	Mike Rush
2015	Paul McMurtry	Mike Rush
2016	Paul McMurtry	Mike Rush
2017	Paul McMurtry	Mike Rush
2018	Paul McMurtry	Mike Rush
2019	Paul McMurtry	Mike Rush
2020	Paul McMurtry	Mike Rush
2021	Paul McMurtry	Mike Rush
2022	Paul McMurtry	Mike Rush
2023	Paul McMurtry	Mike Rush

== Population ==
Historical population

Year	Pop.
1637	31 men, plus their families
1640	>200
1648	~400
1651	~100 families
Late 1650s	150+ men, plus others
1666	83 legal voters
1686	>600
1700	700–<750 (Note: In 1711, there were 45 families living north of the Charles River.)
1736	1,200
1750	1,500–1,600
1761	<1,900
1765	1,919
1775	>2,000
1790	1,659
1800	1,973

Year	Pop.
1801	2,000
1830	3,057
1837	3,532
1850	4,447
1860	6,330
1865	7,198 (Note: 27% of the population was foreign-born, and 75% of them were from Ireland. The other 25% were German-speaking.)
1870	7,342
1880	6,233
1888	6,641 (Note: In 1880, the population of East Dedham was 3,600.)
1890	7,123
1892	>7,000
1895	7,211
1899	6,641 (Note: The population decreased in 1897 when Westwood separated and became its own town. The proportion of foreign-born residents then grew to more than 28%.)
1900	7,457
1908	7,774

Year	Pop.
1910	6,641
1915	9,284
1920	10,782
1930	11,043
1940	15,136
1950	15,508
1960	18,407
1970	23,869
1980	26,938
1990	25,298
2000	23,782
2002	23,378
2010	24,729
2020	25,364
2023	24,968

== Schools ==
In 2024, students in the Dedham Public Schools spoke 36 different languages.

=== School Building / Rehabilitation Committee ===
Town Meeting created a School Building/ Rehabilitation Committee (SBRC) in 2000.

=== Dedham Storytellers ===
In 2017, the Dedham Storytellers initiative was founded as a collaboration between students in Michael Mederios' history class at Dedham High School, the Dedham Rotary Club, the Dedham Historical Society, the Dedham Council on Aging, and the Dedham High School Alumni Association. Students interviewed senior citizens who grew up in Dedham over a series of three lunches and a trip to the Historical Society. They then wrote three essays: an autobiography, a biography of the senior citizen they interviewed, and an essay about how their lives compare to those who grew up in town generations earlier. In 2025, the fifth collection of essays, which is stored at the Historical Society, was produced.

=== Dedham Middle School ===
In 2006 the new Dedham Middle School was opened next door to the existing Dedham Middle School, which previously served as Dedham High School from 1915 to 1959. The 130,000 square feet (12,000 m^{2}) Certified Green School cost $22,353,209. The 1847 Charles and Mary Brown House, which was then being used as the school administration's offices, had to be razed to make room for it.

=== Avery School ===
In 2012 a new 61,000 square feet (5,700 m^{2}) Avery Elementary School was opened at a cost of $19,285,949. Like, the Middle School, it was designed by the firm of Dore and Whittier.

The old Avery School became the Mother Brook Arts & Community Center.

=== Early Childhood Education Center ===
In 2015, the SBRC was considering where to build a new Early Childhood Education Center. The 2016 Annual Town Meeting spent two hours debating the construction of a new, stand-alone Early Childhood Education Center at the Dexter School. Despite a split vote of the School Building/ Rehabilitation Committee, and only one of the nine members of the Finance and Warrant Committee speaking in favor of it, the $18.9 million proposal passed with broad support. It was the first pre-school and kindergarten facility in the state financed with money from the state.

=== Oakdale School ===
In June 2023, the School Committee approved plans to shutter the Greenlodge School and merge it with the Oakdale School despite significant opposition to the project. On March 20, 2024, the School Committee reversed course after a public survey showed 81% respondents supported a standalone Oakdale, and only 9% supported a combined Oakdale-Greenlodge and a similar number supported a combined Oakdale-Riverdale. (Note: Of the 647 respondents, 59 preferred a combined Oakdale-Riverdale, 62 supported a combined Oakdale-Greenlodge, and 525 were in favor of a standalone Oakdale.)

In February 2025, voters rejected a proposal to tear down the existing school and build a new school on Madison Street.

=== Riverdale School ===
On August 29 and 30, 2023, the Active Transportation Working Group led a group in painting a mural on Needham Street outside the Riverdale School. The goal of the mural, which depicts rubber ducks floating down the nearby Charles River, was to slow down traffic near the school to improve safety. The image, which is an homage to the local Rotary Club's fundraiser, is expected to last between six months and two years. It was designed by Kate Bergeron and Jaimie Varasconi.

=== Ursuline Academy ===
On October 18, 2024, a mass was held in the gymnasium at Ursuline Academy to mark the transfer of sponsorship from the Ursuline Sisters to the Ursuline Education Foundation, a lay-led organization. During the mass, a silver ciborium was transferred from Sister Elisa Ryan, the prioress of the Ursuline Sisters of the Central Province, to Kate Levesque, the head of school.

The ciborium was originally used by the French Navy in the 1700s and eventually was given to a Boston priest, possibly Bishop Jean-Louis Lefebvre de Cheverus. It was used by the sisters in Charlestown before the Ursuline Convent riots in 1834, and was saved when a group of sisters hid it below a clump of asparagus in the garden. It eventually made its way into the Boston College archives before being returned to Ursuline Academy for the transfer of sponsorship.

== 375th Anniversary ==
In 2011 the Town of Dedham celebrated its 375 anniversary. A steering committee was appointed by the Selectmen to coordinate a year's worth of activities marking the occasion. The committee was composed of Marie-Louise Kehoe, Donna Greer, Nancy Baker, Mayanne Brigss, Dan Hart, Michele Heffernan, Joan Jolley, Brian Keaney, Vicky Kruckeberg, and Sarah MacDonald, with Kehoe and Greer serving as co-chairs. In September, the same month the Town was incorporated by the Great and General Court, a 375th Birthday Party was held at the Endicott Estate with over 7,500 people attending. The food, rides, games, and trolley tours (Note: The text of the tour is online.) were free for Dedham residents, and non residents paid $5 a person or $20 for a family.

Other events included a cocktail party at the Endicott Estate, an Ecumenical Church Service where each congregation gave their history, an essay contest for schoolchildren, and more.

== Awards and honors ==
Dedham Middle School Principal Debra Gatley was named the Massachusetts Secondary School Administrators' Association Principal of the Year in 2015.

In 2012 the Town Meeting created the Public Service Recognition Committee to recognize citizens who have performed outstanding acts of service to the community. In 2013 Don Gosselin was recognized before the Annual Town Meeting, and in 2014 Amy Black won the adult award and Caroline Bell won the youth award. In 2015 the winner was Bill Podolski.

In 2015, the Dedham Fire Department unveiled a plaque on the front of their headquarters honoring the line of duty death of Chief Henry J. Harrigan. During the ceremony, an alarm sounded and several firefighters left on Engine 4 to extinguish a cooking fire at a housing complex for senior citizens.

A few weeks later, the Henry J. Harrigan Medal of Honor was awarded to Lieutenant William Walsh and Firefighter Jared Blaney for "going above and beyond the call of duty and putting themselves at extreme risk" by entering a burning building on Harding Terrace to save a victim trapped inside.

In 2023, Roselyn "Rose" Murphy became the first female Eagle Scout from Dedham.

== Television and film ==
Dedham has been the setting or filming location of a number of films and television shows:

- The Endicott Estate was also featured in the 2000 film The Perfect Storm.
- The award-winning 2000 film State and Main was filmed in Dedham, and Alec Baldwin's character slept in the Endicott Estate.
- The 2014 film The Judge was filmed partly in Dedham Square, showing the Norfolk Superior Court and First Church.
- Kathryn Bigelow's 2017 film, Detroit, was filmed inside the Dedham District Court.
- The film I Care a Lot was filmed at the Norfolk County Courthouse and Norfolk County Registry of Deeds.
- In July 2023, the television show Pawn Stars came to the Endicott Estate to film an episode in their series, Pawn Stars do America. On July 26, Rick Harrison introduced the band playing at the Dedham Junior Women's Club community concert on the Estate lawn.
- Scenes from the 2023 film Finestkind were filmed in Dedham.

=== The Friends of Eddie Coyle and the Citizen's Bank robbery ===
The movie The Friends of Eddie Coyle was released on DVD in May 2009. Several key scenes had been shot in Dedham, including a bank robbery.

On June 16, 2009, just a few weeks later, the same bank was robbed in a manner reminiscent of how it was done in the film. Delroy George Henry drove up to the bank minutes before it opened. He then forced his way in the bank and tried to get the staff to open the vault. He also ordered staff to sit on the ground while brandishing a gun, just as was done in the film.

An employee sent a text message to an employee in another branch who then called the Dedham Police Department. A police officer working a detail 100 yards away responded quickly and apprehended Henry.

== Athletics ==
In 2007, the Dedham High School Marauders changed their logo from a Native American to a pirate. In 2015 discussions began about changing the logo again.

Commemorating its 30th year, the James Joyce Ramble in 2013, 2014 and 2015 was the host for the USA Track & Field National Masters 10K Championship. It was canceled in 2020 and 2021 due to COVID-19.

In 2015, Declan Harris won the Massachusetts Interscholastic Athletic Association's state wrestling championship at the 145 pound weight class, and Eric Reyes won at the 160 pound weight class. Reyes had won at 145 pounds in 2014, and at 126 pounds in 2013.

Joey Lenane won the United States Golf Association's 94th annual New England Amateur Golf Championship on July 20, 2023, during his second attempt at the tournament. The victory gave him an automatic invitation to the next U.S. Open and British Open. (Note: At the time, Lenane was a rising sophomore at North Carolina State University and an alumnus of Xaverian Brothers High School. He trained at the George Wright Golf Club in Hyde Park, Boston.)

Peter Megdal set a world record by racing 47.43 kilometers in one hour on his bicycle in 2023. The Dedham High School boys hockey team competed in the state championships at the Boston Garden on March 16, 2025.

== Free Little Libraries ==
Beginning in 2013, the Dedham Library Innovation Team began installing Little Free Libraries around Dedham. In 2021, a grant from the Dedham Cultural Council enabled a restoration and maintenance plan to be implemented by Sal D'Antonia.

Location	Theme	Artist
Town Hall	Little red schoolhouse	Dedham High School students
Dedham Square	Head in the clouds, feet in the trees	Marietta Apollonio
Endicott station	Poppies	Susan Hoy
Veteran's Road	Library in the leaves	Rev. Rali Weaver
Barnes Memorial Park	Pattern recognition	Lisa Houck
Oakdale Square	Stars and stripes	Luke Barry
Legacy Place	Our little library	Peter H. Reynolds
O'Brien Way	ABCs of literacy	Leah Badessa, Hannah Romanish, Rachel Strykowski
Dedham Corporate Center station	Celebrating Dedham Pottery	Clarissa Robyn
Terri's Market	Under the stars	Cindy Mootz
Colburn Street	Victorian roses	Sarah Edson

== Flag Day Parade ==
The Flag Day Parade, one of Dedham's most beloved traditions, was nearly cancelled following the 2008 financial crisis, but a fundraising campaign saved it. The 48th annual parade was held on June 14, 2015, with honorary Grand Marshall Bob Aldous.

In 2017, for the 50th anniversary, the parade was moved from the traditional June 14, to Saturday, June 17 to accommodate the fireworks at Memorial Park that were part of the celebration. During the COVID-19 pandemic, the parade was canceled in 2020 and 2021. In its place, an unofficial "rolling rally" of cars was held in its place along the same route.

== Other ==
In June 2025, Mother Brook became the first historic district in Dedham in more than 30 years, and the first created outside of Precienct One. The Dedham Retired Men's Club celebrated its 50th anniversary with a dinner at the Endicott Estate on April 24, 2026. They had at least 25 members who were over 90, with the oldest, Joe Masotta, at 100 years old.

=== Churches ===
An addition was added to the Fellowship Bible Church in 2005. The steeple of the First Church and Parish in Dedham was lit up to celebrate the 250th anniversary of the start of the American Revolutionary War on April 19, 2025.

=== Holidays ===
October 21, 2022, the 225th anniversary of the launching of the USS Constitution, was celebrated as Commander John A. Benda Day in Dedham following a vote at Town Meeting and a proclamation from the Select Board. Benda was the second commanding officer of the Constitution to come from Dedham after Samuel Nicholson.

In honor of the extensive Christmas light display that the Cushman and Civitarese family put on at their house for 50 years, December 3, 2023, was declared to be Rita Mae Cushman Day in Dedham.

=== Karen Read trial ===
When Karen Read was tried for the murder of John O'Keefe at the Norfolk County Courthouse in 2024, the case drew a great deal of media attention and protesters who believed Read was innocent and was being framed by the Canton Police Department. The judge in the case, Beverly Cannone, ordered a 200-foot buffer zone to be established around the courthouse to "reduce the risk of exposing witnesses or jurors in this case to such outside influences."

=== Fires ===
The owner of the home at 147 Turner Street was able to get out of the house when it caught on fire on December 8, 2024, but his cats were not. The Dedham Fire Department was able to rescue them.

== Works cited ==
- Dedham Historical Society (2001). Images of America: Dedham. Arcadia Publishing. ISBN 978-0-7385-0944-0.
- Free Public Library Commission of Massachusetts (1908). Report of the Free Public Library Commission of Massachusetts. Secretary of the Commonwealth.
- Hanson, Robert Brand (1976). Dedham, Massachusetts, 1635-1890. Dedham Historical Society.
- Knudsen, Harold M. (2025). Fisher Ames, Christian Founding Father & Federalist. Liberty Hill Publishing.
- Lockridge, Kenneth (1985). A New England Town. New York: W.W. Norton & Company. ISBN 978-0-393-95459-3.
- Massachusetts Board of Library Commissioners (1899). Report of the Free Public Library Commission of Massachusetts.
- Neiswander, Judith (2024). Mother Brook and the Mills of East Dedham. Damianos Publishing. ISBN 978-1-941573-66-2.
- Parr, James L. (2009). Dedham: Historic and Heroic Tales From Shiretown. The History Press. ISBN 978-1-59629-750-0.
- Worthington, Erastus (1827). The History of Dedham: From the Beginning of Its Settlement, in September 1635, to May 1827. Dutton and Wentworth. pp. 106–107.
