= Timeline of Dedham, Massachusetts =

This is a timeline of the history of the town of Dedham, Massachusetts.

== 17th century ==
=== 1630s ===
==== 1635 ====
- May 6, 1635 - The General Court granted permission to residents of Watertown to set off and establish new towns.

==== 1636 ====
- March 1636 - The General Court ordered that the bounds of what would become Dedham be mapped out.
- April 1636 - The committee appointed to map out the bounds reported back.
- August 18, 1636 - The colonial settlers met for the first time in Watertown. The Town Covenant was signed. (Note: Barber has the date as August 15, 1636)
- August 18, 1636 - Thomas Bartlett was ordered to begin surveying the land of the new plantation.
- August 18, 1636 - The Old Village Cemetery was set apart with land taken from Nicholas Phillips and Joseph Kingsbury.
- August 29, 1636 - The original proprietors requested additional land on both sides of the Charles River from the General Court.
- September 7, 1636 - The General Court incorporated Dedham.
- September 5, 1636 - The number of proprietors grew from 18 at the first meeting to 25 proprietors willing to set out for the new community.
- November 25, 1636 - So few people had actually moved to Dedham that the proprietors voted to require every man to move to Dedham permanently by the first day of the following November or they would lose the land they had been granted.
- November 1636 - A loophole was closed to ensure that those who were not committed to the same ideals were not admitted as townsmen.

==== 1637 ====
- 1637 - There are 31 men, plus their families, living in Dedham.
- 1637- The Fairbanks House was constructed.
- 1637 - Abraham Shaw arrived in Dedham. He was granted 60 acres (24 ha) of land as long as he erected a watermill, which he intended to build on the Charles River near the present day Needham Street bridge. (Note: Another condition of the grant was that if Shaw ever sold the mill, the Town would have the right of first refusal to purchase it back from him.)
- March 1637 -Many settlers moved to their new village.
- March 23, 1636–37 - The first town meeting held.
- April 1637 - The Town voted to begin keeping watch to prevent Indian attacks.
- May 1637 - Residents were lamenting the time and resources they were spending on patrols.
- June 3, 1637 - Ruth Morse was the first child born to white parents, John and Annis, in Dedham.
- July 18, 1637 - John Allin, Michael Metcalf, Robert Hinsdale, Eleazer Lusher, Timothy Dalton, and Allin's brother-in-law, Thomas Fisher, and others were admitted to town.
- August 11, 1637 - A total of 46 house lots had been laid out and it was voted to stop admitting new residents.
- August 11, 1637 - The Town voted to invite Peter Prudden and 15 or more of his followers to join them, but since Dedham was not geographically situated to become a center of commerce the invitation was declined.
- Late 1637 - Meetings are held to consider forming a church.

==== 1638 ====
- 1638 - First survey of the town is undertaken.
- 1638 - Abraham Shaw died before he could complete his mill.
- 1638 - Seven-year-old John Dwight disappeared in the woods near Wigwam Pond, an area known to be particularly infested with wolves. (Note: Parr has the date as March 1639, and Dwight's age as 17, not seven.)
- January 1, 1638 -The Town voted to construct a meetinghouse.
- November 1638 - The meeting house is complete.
- November 8, 1638- The church covenant was signed and the First Church and Parish in Dedham was gathered.

==== 1639 ====
- 1639 - Thomas Bartlett had stopped surveying land, work for which he was not paid.
- Late 1639 - John Phillips, though he had earlier rejected a call to be minister, decided to settle in Dedham after all.
- March 25, 1639 - Mother Brook was ordered to be dug at public expense by the Town, (Note: "Ordered yt a Ditch shalbe made at a comon charge thrugh purchashed medowe unto ye East brooke yt may bother be a ptieon fence in ye same; as also may serve for a course unto a water mille; yt it shall be found fitting to set a mille upon ye sayd brooke by ye judgement of a workman for yt purpose.") and a tax was levied on settlers to pay for it.
- April 24, 1639 - John Allin was ordained as pastor. John Hunting was ordained Ruling Elder.
- May 3, 1639 - The first seven selectmen were chosen "by general consent" and given "full power to contrive, execute and perform all the business and affairs of this whole town."
- May 17, 1639 - The first Town Clerk was elected.

=== 1640s ===
- 1640s - The town began permitting residents to fence in their strips of land in the common field.
- 1640 - There are more than 200 residents.
- 1640- Thomas Bartlett sold his holdings in Dedham and left town.
- 1641 -The first corn mill was erected by John Elderkin at a dam on East Brook next to the present day Condon Park and near the intersection of Bussey St and Colburn St.
- January 1, 1644, by unanimous vote, Dedham authorized the first U.S. taxpayer-funded public school; "the seed of American education."
- July 14, 1641 - First recorded instance of water running through Mother Brook.
- October 1641 - John Phillips became unsatisfied in his new pulpit and returned to his old church in England.
- 1642 - Only months after opening his mill, John Elderkin moved out of town. He sold half of his rights to Whiting and the other half to John Allin, Nathan Aldis, and John Dwight. (Note: Allin was the minister, Aldis the deacon, and Dwight was Whiting's father-in-law.)
- 1643 - A common tillage field of 200 acres was laid out and each man was assigned a specific length of fence to build to enclose it.
- 1644 - A sawmill was opened in Tiot.
- 1645 - Needham Street was laid out.
- 1646 - An addition is ordered to be built on the meetinghouse.
- 1646 - Jonathan Fairbanks joined the First Church and Parish in Dedham.
- 1648 - A vote is taken to purchase a bell for the meetinghouse.
- 1648 - There are approximately 400 residents.
- 1648 - John Thurston was commission by the town to build the first schoolhouse; he received a partial payment of £11.0.3 on December 2, 1650.
- 1648 to 1688 - The number of family names in town decreased from 63 to 57.
- 1649 - Joshua Fisher started Fisher's Tavern.
- October 23, 1649 - The General Court granted additional lands in what is today Medway so long as they established a separate village there within one year.

=== 1650s ===
- 1650- Dedham agreed to give up 2,000 acres (8.1 km^{2}) of what is today Natick to the "praying Indians.
- 1651 - There are approximately 100 families in Dedham.
- January 11, 1651 - Town Meeting voted to release Medfield.
- May 1651 - The General Court agreed to release Medfield.
- 1651 - A one shilling fine was imposed for taking a canoe without permission.
- January 1652 - Town Meeting voted to dig the "Great Ditch," creating the island of Riverdale.
- 1652 - Nathaniel Whiting sold his mill and all his town rights to John Dwight, Francis Chickering, Joshua Fisher, and John Morse for 250 pounds, but purchased it back the following year.
- 1652 - A bell is hung in the meetinghouse.
- January 1653 - The Town offered land to Robert Crossman if he would build a mill on the Charles where Shaw had originally intended.
- 1653 - Gunpowder begins to be stored in the meetinghouse roof.
- Disputes began arising with the Praying Indians of Natick.
- 1656 - Only three percent of the land, 3,000 acres, had been distributed, with the rest being retained by the town.
- Between 1656 and 1667, over 15,000 acres were allotted to townsmen.
- 1658 - A committee was appointed to look into setting up an ironworks within the town.
- 1658 - Jonathan Fairbanks served as selectman.

==== 1657 ====
- 1657 - Henry Phillips, a former selectman, was so upset by his allotment that he took off and moved to Boston. He led a group of dissatisfied settlers in a rare public complaint. He brought his complaint before the General Court, which was an action even more rare in a community whose covenant called for disputes to be resolved by local mediation.
- 1657 - The plastering work in the meetinghouse is complete.
- 1657 - There was still 125,000 acres remaining to be distributed to settlers.
- January 23, 1657 -The growth of the town was further limited to descendants of those living there at the time. Newcomers could settle there, so long as they were like-minded, but they would have to buy their way into the community. Land was no longer freely available for those who wished to join.
- Late 1650s There are more than 150 men, plus others, living in Dedham.

=== 1660s ===
- 1660 - New residents were not invited to sign the Dedham Covenant.
- 1660 - Five men were sent to explore the lakes near George Indian's wigwam in Wollomonopoag and to report back to the selectmen what they found.
- March 1661 - It was voted to start a new settlement at Wollomonopoag. The Town sent Richard Ellis and Timothy Dwight to go negotiate with King Phillip to purchase the title to the area.
- 1661 - Dedham gave up attempts at friendly solutions and took the Praying Indians to court, suing for title to the land the Indians were inhabiting.
- 1661 - Richard Ellis refused to serve as Town Clerk.
- 1663 - A committee dispatched to evaluate land granted in return for 2,000 acres given to the "praying Indians" of Natick submitted a bill for their expenses.
- 1663 - A decline in church membership meant nearly half the men in town were not members.
- January 1663 - A meeting was called, and the 10 men (Note: It is not known who all 10 were, but they included Anthony Fisher, Richard Ellis, Robert Weare, and Isaac Bullard.) who volunteered to go to Wollomonopoag raised several concerns about their ability to establish a village there.
- June 24, 1665 - Deadline given to Daniel Pond and Ezra Morse to erect a new corn mill on Mother Brook.
- August 1669 (Note: Hanson has the letter dated 25 May 1669. Dwight has the date of offer to be in November.) - The Town Fathers received an odd letter from King Phillip offering to negotiate for more land if they would quickly send him a "holland shirt."

=== 1670s ===
- 1670s - As the Utopian spirit of the community waned, it became necessary to impose a tax to ensure the minister was paid.
- 1670 - Less than half of residents were church members.
- May 23, 1670 - The drawing of lots took place in what is today Deerfield.

==== 1671 ====
- 1671 - Five men attempt again to start a settlement at Wollomonopoag.
- April 12, 1671 - Zachariah Smith was passing through Dedham. He was found dead the next morning.
- August 1671 - John Allin dies.
- December 1671 - William Adams has been approached several times about becoming Dedham's new minister.

==== 1672 ====
- February 17, 1672 - William Adams agrees to preach in Dedham.

==== 1673 ====
- February 3, 1673 - A referendum to build a new meetinghouse was held with voters casting a piece of white corn if they were in favor and a piece of red corn if they were opposed. The vote was nearly unanimous in favor.
- May 7, 1673 - The General Court separated the town of Deerfield, with additional lands, provided they establish a church and settle a minister within three years.
- May 27, 1673 - William Adams moves to Dedham.
- June 16, 1673 - The new meetinghouse was erected.
- September 1673 - William Adams begins preaching on a trial basis.
- October 16, 1673 The General Court separated the new town of Wrentham, Massachusetts.
- December 3, 1673 - William Adams is ordained.

==== 1674 ====
- 1674 - People began sitting in places other than those assigned for them in the meetinghouse.

==== 1675 ====
- 1675 - Laws that restricted the presence of strangers were rarely enforced.
- 1675 - The Colony took the Town to court for failing to establish a grammar school.
- 1675 - Taxpayers paid more the county and colony than they did to the town, reflecting a growing importance of the regional bodies and the cost of the colony expanding westward.
- June 26, 1675 - Captain Daniel Henchmen and a company of militiamen arrived in Dedham after the raid on Swansea.
- December 8, 1675 - Plymouth Colony governor Josiah Winslow and Captain Benjamin Church rode from Boston to Dedham to take charge of the 465 soldiers and 275 cavalry assembling there and together departed on for the Great Swamp Fight. (Note: Hanson has the date as December 9th.)

==== 1676 ====
- February 1676 - During the battle in Lancaster, Jonas Fairbanks and his son Joshua both died. Richard Wheeler, whose son Joseph was killed in battle the previous August, also died that day.
- July 25, 1676 - Pomham, one of King Phillip's chief advisors, was captured in Dedham.

==== 1677 ====
- September 1677 - John Plympton and Quentin Stockwell were captured in Deerfield and marched to Canada.
- November 1677 - When a great black boar, eight feet long, walked into town, nearly every man was assembled around it with his musket before they could subdue it. Eventually it would take 13 bullets before it was killed.

==== 1678 ====
- 1678 - Oldest known instance of the name "Mother Brook" being used.
- 1678 - Town Meeting voted not to hear any more complaints from Nathaniel Whiting about his mill.

=== 1680s ===
- 1680s - The Town fathers sought out and purchased the rights to the land from every native person who claimed to own land or hold title.
- 1681 - Residents were supposed to inform the selectmen of any worker who was expected to stay in town for more than two weeks, though the law was largely ignored.
- 1681 - The first accounting of servants took place. There were 28 servants serving in 22 of the 112 households in town.
- 1681 - The town voted to collect all deeds and other writings and store them in a box kept by Deacon John Aldis in order to better preserve them.
- 1682 - A fulling mill was opened at Saw Mill Lane by Nathaniel Whiting and James Draper.
- 1685 - William Adams dies.
- 1685 to 1692 - The church is without a minister.
- 1686 - Much of the overt Utopian spirit the founders had instilled 50 years prior had been destroyed.
- 1686 - There are more than 600 residents in town.

=== 1690s ===
- 1691 - As the county grew more powerful, the town began more closely following the law lest they get fined.
- 1691 - The Colony took the Town to court for failing to establish a grammar school.
- Late 1691 - The church voted again to accept the half-way covenant and declared that Allin was right to have tried to get them to accept it.
- March 1692 - Joseph Belcher began preaching.
- November 29, 1693 - Joseph Belcher was installed as the minister.
- 1699 -The Morse dam at present day Maverick Street was removed, and Morse was given 40 acres of land near the Neponset River at Tiot in compensation.

== 18th century ==
=== 1700s ===
- 1700 - There were between 700 and 750 residents in Dedham.
- 1700 - One of Whiting's mills burned, so the Town loaned him 20 pounds to rebuild.
- 1704 - The election of 1704 saw multiple members of the Board of Selectmen voted out of office, which was then followed by court cases and two new elections.
- 1706 - Some members of outlying areas were attending church in other towns. Town Meeting voted to grant the selectmen the power, on a case-by-case basis, to allow those individuals to deduct the money they paid for ministers outside Dedham from the taxes they paid for Dedham's minister.
- 1709 - A group who lived north of the Charles River asked to increase the tax rate by £8 so that they might hire a minister to preach to them.

=== 1710s ===
- 1711 - The first poorhouse opened.
- 1711 - Needham became its own town.
- 1713 - There was no more free land to be distributed. Anyone who wished to own land from that point forward would have to purchase it.
- 1717 - Joseph Ellis became the first moderator from outside the village center.
- 1717 -Town Meeting voted to exempt residents from paying the minister's salary if they lived more than five miles from the meetinghouse.
- May 13, 1717 - Town Meeting voted to allow those in outlying areas to stop paying for the central village's minister and to move the school around town seasonally.
- November 27, 1719 - Bellingham became its own town.

=== 1720s ===
- 1721 - Belcher came down with a "dangerous paralysis" and went to Roxbury to the home of his son-in-law, Rev. Thomas Walter.
- 1721 - Town Meeting voted to periodically move the school from place to place around the town, relieving the burden of students who lived in outlying areas.
- March 7, 1721- The sawmill village asked to establish their own church, but, the Town voted not to allow it.
- May 15, 1721 - The sawmill village asked to break away and become their own town. Town Meeting voted no.
- Autumn 1721 - Joseph Belcher became too ill to preach.
- March 6, 1722 - The residents of the Clapboardtrees section of town asked Town Meeting to be set off as a parish or their own town. After the election of 1726, when those from the central village recaptured the entire board of selectmen, they went directly to the General Court asking to be set off as a new town. The Court referred it to their net session, at which time they dismissed it.
- 1723 - Snow fell so deep that residents could not access their woodlots and had to cut the branches off of live trees to survive.
- 1723 - Samuel Dexter, was hired as the minister.
- May 1724 - The sawmill village broke away as the Town of Walpole.
- July 1725 - Displeased with the minister, a number of congregants walked out of the church.
- March 6, 1727 - The Town Meeting was so contested it took two days to finish. A secret ballot was used to elect men to fill individual seats, as opposed to voting for the entire board at the same time. Every incumbent lost their seat, the first time since 1690.
- November 1727 - Joseph Ellis, a resident of the Clapboardtrees section of town, was elected as representative to the General Court. Following the election, 49 men from the central village petitioned the General Court to say that his election was illegal but were unsuccessful; Ellis went on to serve six terms.
- 1728 - A majority of residents, which had thirty family names between them, could trace their ancestors back to 1648.
- March 1728 - The Town meeting descended into chaos when the moderator was struck by three men with muskets after he tried to adjourn a potentially illegal meeting.
- 1728 - After the brawl of 1728, and the large number of petitions sent to it, the General Court sent a committee to Dedham to investigate. They refused to consider independence, but set aside Clapboardtrees and South Dedham as a separate precinct.
- 1729 - The tax rolls stopped listing the names of the most prominent citizens first, as had been done by the rank conscious first settlers, and instead listed names alphabetically. (Note: Until 1662, the minister's name appeared first on the tax list and the elder was second until 1646.)

=== 1730s ===
- 1731 - A group of Anglicans, the future St. Paul's Church began meeting in Clapboardtrees.
- 1732 - Nathaniel Ames moved to Dedham and developed a reputation as the village eccentric.
- 1734- A 20 shilling bounty per bobcat was established in 1734, and the last person to claim it did so in 1957.
- 1735 - Residents of Clapboardtrees hired Rev. Josiah Dwight along with some like minded residents of the village.
- 1736 - There were 1,200 residents.
- 1736 - The General Court ratified the legally dubious action of Dwight's hiring.
- 1736 - Some farm land had already been worn out.
- 1737 - Clapboardtrees became the Third Precinct.

=== 1740s ===
- April 26, 1745 - George Whitefield preached in Dedham.

=== 1750s ===
- 1750 There were between 1,500 and 1,600 residents.
- 1750 - The outer precincts contained 60% of the population but 75% of the poor.
- 1756 - Samuel Colburn (Note: Colburn was a descendant of Nathaniel Colburn and John Hunting.) died in the Crown Point Expedition. Though he was not an Anglican, he left almost his entire estate to the Anglican community in Dedham to establish St. Paul's Church.
- 1756 - With the town growing and multiple schoolhouses being built, the school was essentially split into districts.
- 1756 - Following Braddock's Defeat, Colonel George Washington passed through Dedham along East Street on his way to see Governor William Shirley to obtain a military commission.
- 1758 - The first St. Paul's Church was built on Court Street, diagonally across from where the current church stands.
- 1758 - Eleven Acadians arrived in Dedham in 1758 after the British deported them from what is today Nova Scotia. Though they were Catholics, the officially Protestant town accepted them and they "were allowed harbor in town as 'French Neutrals.'"

=== 1760s ===
- 1761 - There were less than 1,900 residents.
- 1761 - St. Paul's Church was dedicated.
- October 12, 1763 - Benjamin Franklin stayed at the Ames Tavern.
- 1765 - There were 1,919 residents.
- 1765- Stagecoach service between Boston and Providence began stopping in Dedham four days a week.
- October 21, 1765 - Town Meeting instructed Samuel Dexter to opposed the Stamp Act 1765.
- July 22, 1766 - Nathaniel Ames and the Sons of Liberty erected the Pillar of Liberty on the church green at the Corner of High and Court streets. Seven months later, a 10' pillar was added with a bust of William Pitt the Younger.
- December 1, 1766 - Town Meeting voted to condemn the mob action in Boston that destroyed property.
- 1767 - Mill owners in Newton and Watertown petitioned officials for relief from the Mother Brook diversion.
- 1767 - A sill was installed where the Charles River is diverted into Mother Brook to control the flow.
- 1767 - The powder house was completed and stands today at 162 Ames Street.
- November 16, 1767 - After Parliament adopted the Townshend Acts, Town Meeting voted to join in the boycott of imported goods:

=== 1770s ===
==== 1770 ====
- 1770 - Anglican minister William Clark commented with disdain on the republican sensibilities of Dedhamites. He found their notions of liberty to be more akin to licentiousness, and asked to be transferred to congregations in Georgetown, Maine or Annapolis, Nova Scotia, but was refused by the Society for the Propagation of the Gospel.
- March 5, 1770 - On the same day Parliament voted to repeal the Townshend Acts, Town Meeting that "we will not directly or indirectly have any commerce or dealing with those few traders... who have had so little regard to the good of their country" as to oppose the boycott. It also voted that "we will not make use of any foreign tea, nor allow the consumption of it in our respective families."

==== 1771 ====
- 1771 - St. Paul's Church was plastered and permanent seats were installed.

==== 1772 ====
- 1772 - There was a severe measles outbreak.

==== 1773 ====
- 1773 - There was a severe measles outbreak.
- 1773 - Martin Draper's house fell into the river.
- December 27, 1773 - Eleven days after the Sons of Liberty dumped tea into Boston Harbor, Town Meeting gathered to "highly approve" the actions taken by the mob and to create a Committee of Correspondence to keep in touch with other communities.

==== 1774 ====
- 1774 - The year after the Boston Tea Party, the Town outlawed India tea and appointed a committee to publish the names of any resident caught drinking it.
- May 1774, Eliphalet Pond signed a controversial letter with several other addressed to Governor Thomas Hutchinson that was, in the opinion of many in Dedham, too effusive in praise given the actions the British crown had recently taken on the colonies.
- September 6, 1774 - Richard Woodward, a member of the Committee of Correspondence, hosted the gathering that later adopted the Suffolk Resolves at the Woodward Tavern.
- October 18, 1774, the first parish met to choose military officers.

==== 1775 ====
- 1775 - There were more than 2,000 residents.
- January 1775 - There was a "long debate" about whether the Town should raise a militia company at but, unable to come to a consensus, the matter was deferred until March.
- March 6, 1775 - A company of 60 minutemen was established and bound to serve for nine months.
- April 19, 1775 - A messenger came "down the Needham road" with news about the battle in Lexington. Within an hour of the first notice, the "men of Dedham, even the old men, received their minister's blessing and went forth, in such numbers that scarce one male between sixteen and seventy was left at home."
- May 29, 1775 - The Town voted to hire an additional 120 minutemen.
- June 17, 1775 - 17 Dedham men fought at the Battle of Bunker Hill.
- July 1775 - Abigail Adams came to visit Sam Adams' wife, Betsy, who was living in Dedham. Abigail also attended the First Church and Parish in Dedham to hear Jason Haven preach.

==== 1776 ====
- April 1776 - Residents stoned the Anglican church and then took it for use as a military storehouse.
- April 4, 1776 - George Washington spent the night at Samuel Dexter's home on his way to New York.
- May 1776 - Town Meeting voted that "if the Honourable Congress should, for the safety of the Colonies, declare their independence of the Kingdom of Great Britain, they, the said Inhabitants, will solemnly engage with their lives and fortunes to support them in the measure."

==== 1777 ====
- January 9, 1777 - John Adams stayed at the home of Dr. John Sprague as he rode to Baltimore to attend the Second Continental Congress.
- March 1777 - Rev. William Clark, who held controversial Tory views, announced that he would cease preaching; such an action was easier to swallow than eliminating prayers for the king.
- May 19, 1777 - Clark, along with Samuel White, Tim Richards Jr., and Daniel Webb, were charged by the Selectmen with being traitors to the American Revolution.
- May 21, 1977 - Clark was surrounded by a mob as he went home, but "escaped on my parole."
- June 5, 1777 - Clark was arrested and held for a day at the Woodward Tavern in a room with a picture of Oliver Cromwell.

=== 1780s ===
- June 18, 1784 - Thomas Jefferson ate breakfast at the Ames Tavern.
- 1786 - Nathaniel Kingsbury, Dedham's representative in General Court, was instructed to support laws to reform the practice of law or to simply abolish the profession of lawyer all together.
- 1787 - Mother Brook's fourth mill was established at present day Stone Mill Drive.
- The school districts were officially established by law.

=== 1790s ===
- 1790 - Nathaniel Ames was elected to the General Court but refused to serve.

==== 1791 ====
- 1791 - Nathaniel Ames was elected to the General Court. Upon his election, Ames noted in his diary that he accepted "upon their acceptance to dispense with my attendance... I consider myself as a nominal Representative only to save the Town from being fined."

==== 1792 ====
- 1792 - William Montague became pastor at St. Paul's Church.
- 1792 - Montague began laying out streets and house lots on the Colburn grant. The first street Montague laid out, modern day Church Street, (Note: It was known at the time as New Street.) was the first street in Dedham to be laid out with house lots on either side, as opposed to simply being a road to connect one farm to another.
- 1792 - St. Paul's Church offered their building for use of the courts, but it was in such poor condition that the county declined.

==== 1793 ====
- March 26, 1793 - Norfolk County was created, with Dedham as the shiretown.

==== 1794 ====
- January 7, 1794 - It was so cold in the Norfolk County Courthouse, which lacked any sort of heating, that they moved to the Woodward Tavern across the street.
- October 1794 - Timothy Gay (Note: Timothy Gay, Jr. was the jail keeper and was indicted, but acquitted, in the escape of Jason Fairbanks.) deeded land to the county for the creation of a jail next to his tavern on Highland Street.

==== 1795 ====
- 1795- The jail was completed.
- February 1795 - The jail received its first prisoner.
- 1975 -Charles Bulfinch was hired to design a turret for the courthouse.
- 1795 - The first post office was established in Jeremiah Shuttleworth's West India Goods shop on High Street at the site of the present day Dedham Historical Society building.

==== 1796 ====
- 1796 - A new company was charted by the General Court granting Calvin Whiting the right to deliver water from Federal Hill to house in the High Street and Franklin Square areas using hollowed out pine logs.
- 1796 - The Columbian Minerva newspaper was established by Benjamin and Nathaniel Heaton.

==== 1797 ====
- 1797 - St. Paul's tried to move their church to Franklin Square, but it collapsed.
- Late 1797 - The Heaton brothers sold the Columbian Minerva to Herman Mann.

==== 1798 ====
- 1798 - St. Paul's was reconstructed using various portions of an abandoned church in Stoughton.
- July 4, 1798 - Fisher Ames hosted an Independence Day party for 60 residents that was complete with patriotic songs and speeches. The attendees wrote a complimentary letter to President John Adams, pledging their support should the new nation go to war with France.
- October 1798 - David Brown, Benjamin Fairbanks and about 40 others erected a large liberty pole on the Hartford Road. Brown received the harshest penalty ever imposed under the Alien and Sedition Acts while Fairbanks got the lightest. (Note: Hanson has the fine as five shillings.)

== 19th century ==
- Late 1800s - First large number of Italians moved into Dedham.

=== 1800s ===
- 1800 - A fire truck made by Paul Revere was purchased by a group of citizens and donated to the Town as "a public utility and a very great security against the calamities of fire."
- 1800 - A group of tinsmiths from Connecticut, including Calvin Whiting (Note: Whiting also owned a company that delivered fresh water to homes via hollowed out logs.) and Eli Parsons, began a business at the corner of Lowder and High Streets. They attracted additional businesses, including a dry good store. The area became known as Connecticut Corner. (Note: The term Connecticut Corner has generally fallen out of use in Dedham, but it is listed as a historic district in Dedham. The historic district generally runs down High and Bridge Streets from slightly past Lowder Street to slightly past Common Street. It encompasses the Town Common and the houses around it.)
- 1800 - Colburn Gay of Dedham wished to marry Sarah Ellis of Walpole. The laws at the time said that a wedding must take place in the town of the bride, however Gay insisted that Rev. Thomas Thatcher preside. Thatcher was the minister in Dedham's third parish, however, and could not officiate outside of the town's borders. To resolve this dilemma the couple stood on the Walpole side of Bubbling Brook, and Thatcher stood on the Dedham side. They were married across the stream.
- Alexander Hamilton was the guest of Fisher Ames.
- May 18, 1801 - Jason Fairbanks murdered Elizabeth Fales.
- August 5, 1801 - Fairbanks' murder trial begins. Interest in the case involving two prominent families was so great that the trial was moved to the First Parish Meetinghouse across the street from the courthouse.
- August 8, 1801 - Fairbanks was found guilty and sentenced to death.
- August 17, 1801 - Fairbanks escaped from jail along with several others.
- September 10, 1801 - Fairbanks was returned to Dedham and was hanged. In addition to the military presence, "the 10,000 people who showed up at the Town Common to witness the execution were five times the town’s population at the time."
- 1802 - The Norfolk and Bristol Turnpike forced the moving and reorienting the Colburn family home. It originally sat across what is today the road, and was moved to a position on the new corner where the Knights of Columbus building is today on the northwest corner of the Washington Street-High Street intersection.
- 1802 - A local mason named Martin Marsh built his brick home at what is today 19 Court Street and was then right on one of the new turnpikes.
- April 1802 - Rev. Joshua Bates was called to serve as associate pastor.
- December 30, 1802 - Bates was offered a lifetime appointment to the Dedham pulpit, over the objections of some members.
- A Masonic lodge opened.
- March 16, 1803 - Bates was ordained "before a very crowded, but a remarkably civil and brilliant assembly."
- May 17, 1803 - Jason Haven died.
- July 20, 1803 - Gouverneur Morris visited Fisher Ames.
- 1805 - A vote was taken to expand the meetinghouse, but nothing came from it.
- August 12, 1805 - Martin Marsh saw the traffic flowing daily past his house and quickly turned his home into a tavern.
- 1807 - A second votes was taken to expand the meetinghouse, but nothing came from it either.
- 1807 - Nathaniel Ames discovered the Town was using the taxes he paid for the support of the church to pay the First Church's minister, and not his new Anglican church minister. The tax collector told him it was a bad law and refused to follow it, which prompted Ames to retort that he was as big of a tyrant as Napoleon Bonaparte.
- 1808 - Fisher Ames had enough with Rev. Bates and joined Dedham's Anglican church instead.
- 1809 - A mill at the Fourth Privilege at Mother Brook burned down but was rebuilt with a new raceway and foundation.
- March 1809 - The Mother Brook Mill-owners Association and their counterpart on the Charles went to the Supreme Judicial Court and petitioned for Commissioners of Sewers (Note: Elijah Brigham of Westboro, Jonas Kendall of Leominster, and Loammi Baldwin of Cambridge were appointed by the Court in October 1809.) to determine the proper amount of water to be diverted into Mother Brook.
- July 4, 1809 - A group of Republicans dragged the old town cannon to just below Bates' bedroom window and blew it in the middle of the night.
- September 1, 1809 - The Mother Brook Mill-owners Association incorporated to protect their interests.

=== 1810s ===
- June 4, 1810 - In an expression of public outrage, a number of Dedham citizens assembled" and founded the Society in Dedham for Apprehending Horse Thieves.
- 1811 - A committee was formed to look into complaints that the Norfolk Cotton Manufactory did not provide enough water for downstream mills to use.
- 1812 - After the War of 1812 brought ruin to the Norfolk Cotton Manufactory, the mill was purchased by Benjamin Bussey.
- 1814 - A fifth privilege was granted on Mother Brook in what is today Hyde Park.
- 1814 - The Dedham Bank was founded.
- 1817 - During his tour of the country, President James Monroe visited Dedham and stayed at the home of future Congressman Edward Dowse.
- 1818 - Rev. William Montague left Dedham. (Note: Burgess has his departure as being in 1815.)
- 1818 - Itinerant Methodist ministers begin holding services in private homes in Dedham.
- 1818 - Bates asked to be dismissed from the First Church to accept the presidency of Middlebury College. It is assumed that, due to his differing political beliefs and his politically tinged sermons, that many in the congregation were glad to let him go. His last sermon was delivered February 5, 1818.
- March 1, 1818 - The pulpit committee at First Church introduced Alvan Lamson for the first time.
- July 13, 1818 - The pulpit committee held a meeting to discuss the search for a minister. The committee favored Lamson, but many congregants asked for someone else.
- August 31, 1818 - Two meetings were held at First Church. The first, of the parish, voted to call Lamson by a vote of 81–44. (Note: Those voting in favor, it was later pointed out, owned 80% of the taxable property in the town.) The second, of the church, rejected Lamson by a vote of 17–15. The legality of both meetings would later be called into question.
- September 27, 1818 - Rev. Ganet of Cambridgeport preached at the Sunday service and read a letter of acceptance from Lamson. Several members of the congregation angrily stormed out of the meetinghouse, a few fainted, and one woman threw a violent fit.
- October 14, 1818 - First Church sent letters to 15 other churches calling for a council to consider the situation. (Note: Hanson has the number at 13 churches.) All those invited were either already Unitarian or soon would be.
- October 29, 1818 - The council announced that, after hearing the arguments of both sides the previous day, it would proceed to ordain Lamson. At the ordination ceremony, several deacons and other congregants got up and walked out. After Lamson's ordination, the conservative members who opposed Lamson removed all of the church's portable assets, including parish records, funds, and the valuable silver used for communion with them. They also removed cash, bonds, promissory notes, leases, and accounts. The communion silver was kept in a closet within the church, but disappeared after someone entered through a window.
- November 18, 1818 - A second council was held, this time with congregational churches participating. It expressed a mild condemnation of the parish for appointing a minister against the wishes of the church, though some council members pushed for stronger language.
- 1819 - The Commonwealth sued the Town for failing to hire a grammar school teacher.
- January 29, 1819 - The conservative breakaway members of the church began advertising for contractors to build them a new meetinghouse.
- March 1819 - Judge Samuel Haven published a 100-page pamphlet outlying the argument against Lamson. In it, he used derogatory and insulting language to describe his opponents.
- December 1, 1819 - Haven was arrested after being sued for libel.
- December 30, 1819 - The dedication of the Allin Congregational Church took place in a blizzard.

=== 1820s ===
- February 1820 - Baker v. Fales was heard. In the case, the remaining members of the First Church, brought a suit of replevin against the breakaway church. (Note: The first legal proceeding, largely inconsequential to the ultimate outcome, as whether or not a writ of replevin was appropriate.) They asked a court to order that the records, funds, silver, and other items be returned.
- October 1820 - Baker v. Fales was appealed to the Supreme Judicial Court
- February 1821 - The court unanimously ruled that "[w]hatever the usage in settling ministers, the Bill of Rights of 1780 secures to towns, not to churches, the right to elect the minister, in the last resort."
- 1822 - Baptists begin holding services in Dedham.
- 1823 - Horace Mann opened a law practice in Dedham.
- 1824 - Holes are drilled in the side of a rock to set the proper level of Mother Brook.
- July 4, 1825 - Masonic ceremonies, bell ringing and cannon fire accompanied the laying of the cornerstone of the new Norfolk County Courthouse.
- February 20, 1827 - The new courthouse was dedicated.
- 1828 - A Town House was built on Bullard Street.

=== 1830s ===
- 1832 - Moll Pitcher asked a workman for a sip of his cider. When he refused, she broke her clay pipe in two and told the worker that the same thing would happen to his neck. She also said that the Nanhattan Street house he was working on would burn to the ground, which it did years later.
- 1836 - Railroads arrived in Dedham.
- December 3, 1831 - An agreement was made where one-third of the Charles River flow would be diverted to Mother Brook, and two-thirds would remain in the Charles for use by downstream owners.
- 1832 - President Andrew Jackson stopped for lunch at the Norfolk House.
- October 30, 1832 - A fire broke out in the stables of what would become the Phoenix hotel and destroyed both.
- January 7, 1834 - There was another fire in the stables at the Phoenix Hotel.
- 1835 - The stone mill was erected on present day Stone Mill Drive.
- Dover broke away to become its own town.

=== 1840s ===
- 1840s - The Irish began moving to Dedham following the Great Famine.
- 1842 - The last stagecoach went out of business.
- 1842 - The first resident Methodist pastor, Rev. Joseph Pond, arrived in Dedham.
- 1843 - A Methodist church was completed on Milton Street near the intersection with Walnut Street.
- 1843 - The first Baptist Church opened near Maverick Street.
- May 15, 1843 - The first Catholic Mass in Dedham was celebrated in the home of Daniel Slattery, (Note: Slattery was born in Ireland in 1805 and moved to Dedham while still young. He married Catherine Doggett of Dedham on April 14, 1837 at the Cathedral of the Holy Cross.) with eight Catholics present.
- 1844 - The School Committee began recommending that the town establish a high school.
- 1845 - There were more than 500 people employed in local industries.
- 1845 - St. Paul's Church was consecrated.
- The Temperance Hall Association, which was part of the temperance movement that opposed alcohol, purchased the old Norfolk County Courthouse and set it up as an assembly hall.
- 1846 - A firehouse in East Dedham was constructed on Milton Street near the Old Stone Mill.
- 1846 - The Catholic community in Dedham was established enough that the town became part of the mission of St. Joseph's Church in Roxbury.
- 1848 - The Norfolk County Railroad connected Dedham and Walpole.
- September 20, 1848 - A young Congressman named Abraham Lincoln gave a speech at the Norfolk House while in Massachusetts to campaign for Zachary Taylor.
- 1849 - The hands of the clock were stopped at the hour of Daniel Slattery's wife's death. The unusual occurrence of a Catholic funeral mass elicited much interest around the town.

=== 1850s ===
- 1850s -A proposal was made by James Tisdale to take portions of Dedham, Dover, and Walpole to create a new town of Waldeddo, but nothing came from it.
- 1850s - Germans began moving to Dedham in large numbers.
- 1850 - Under threat of a lawsuit, the town meeting voted to "instruct the Town's School Committee to hire a building and teacher, and establish a High School according to law." A sum of $3,000 was appropriated to support it.
- 1854 - Renovations to the courthouse added gas lights to the building and running water from an on-site well.
- January 7, 1850 - A third fire broke out at the Phoenix Hotel.
- September 15, 1851 - Dedham High School opened with 42 students.
- 1852 - A new Baptist church was built at the corner of Milton and Myrtle Streets.
- 1854 - The Boston and New York Central ran through town.
- 1854 - Dedham High moved to the town house on Bullard Street.
- December 10, 1855 - A new high school was dedicated on Highland Street.
- 1856 - The cornerstone of the first St. Mary's was laid on Washington Street between Spruce and Marion Streets.
- 1857 - St. Mary's Church was completed. It could seat 700 people.
- 1856 - St. Paul's Church burned down.
- Easter Sunday, April 12, 1857 - Father Patrick O'Beirne said Mass for the first time at St. Mary's.
- 1858 - A committee was complaining that the Town House was "neither in location, size, or style, sufficient to meet the reasonable requirements of the town."
- 1858 - The fourth St. Paul's Church was completed.
- May 13, 1858 - Members of the various town ball teams in the Boston area met at the Phoenix Hotel to form the Massachusetts Association of Baseball Players. The association developed a set of rules that came to be known as the Massachusetts Game.

=== 1860s ===
- 1860 - The courthouse was fireproofed to protect county records. (Note: The original design had brick floors on top of a layer of salt covering a wooden subfloor, providing little protection from a fire originating in the cellar.)
- 1860 - A Catholic priest was available to say mass in South Dedham every other week.
- April 1861 - Several days after the fall of Fort Sumter, a mass meeting was held in Temperance Hall which opened with a dramatic presentation of the American flag. A total of 47 men signed up to serve in the war at that meeting, forming Dedham's first military unit since the Dedham militia was disbanded in 1846.
- April 1861 - The women of the town immediately began working on producing supplies for the troops at the outbreak of war. In a span of 24 hours, they sewed 100 flannel shirts, of which 60 were sent to the state and 40 were reserved for Dedham soldiers. In the next two weeks, they made an additional 140 shirts, 140 pairs of flannel underwear, 126 towels, 132 handkerchiefs, 24 hospital shirts, 70 pincushions, 70 bags, and a handful of needlebooks.
- June 1861 - The Dedham Company was designated as Company F of the 18th Massachusetts Infantry Regiment by the Adjunct General of Massachusetts.
- August 23, 1861- Dedham's troops were shipped out to the front lines near Washington, D.C.
- 1861-1854 - During the Civil War, the Dedham Transcript wrote that "Almost to a man," the Catholic men of Dedham "answered Lincoln's call," and sadly "no church in Dedham lost so many men in proportion to their numbers as did St. Mary's." Their patriotism and deaths did much to counter the anti-Catholic bias that existed in town.
- 1863 - The Norfolk County Courthouse was remodeled and a dome was added.
- August 3, 1863 - St. Catherine's Church in South Dedham was dedicated as part of St. Mary's parish.
- April 1865 - The first notice of Abraham Lincoln's death was posted on a buttonwood tree in front of the home of Jeremiah Shuttleworth, today the Dedham Historical Society.
- 1863 - There was an attempted burglary of the Dedham Bank with the would be thieves using gunpowder.
- 1866 - The Town abolished all school districts by purchasing all 11 buildings for a total of $49,180 and returned their value to the taxpayers of the respective districts.
- 1867 - The Farrington farm was laid out into house plots by the Elmwood Land Company and became the Endicott neighborhood.
- 1867 - It was decided that a new building should be erected to both house the town offices and to memorialize those who died in the Civil War.
- 1867 - A house was purchased on High Street by Father John Brennan and was converted into a rectory. Plans were then made for a new St. Mary's Church to be constructed at this location.
- 1869 - Gas streetlights were introduced in 1869.
- 1869 - A bell tower is added to St. Paul's Church.

=== 1870s ===
- 1870 - The Merchant's Woolen Company was the largest taxpayer in town.
- 1871 - William B. Gould moved to Dedham with his wife, Cornelia.
- 1871 - William Whiting sold the remainder of the family farm. Charles Sanderson began laying it out in a subdevelopment to become known as Oakdale.
- 1872 - Norwood broke away to become its own town.
- 1872 - The first steam fire engine was purchased.
- 1872 - The Dedham Public Library was established and first occupied rented space at the corner of Court Street and Norfolk Street.
- 1873 - The Whiting/ Turner tract of land was developed into Ashcroft.
- 1873 - Lay readers from the Anglican church began ministering to Episcopalians in the Oakdale section of town who could not get to the church easily.
- 1876 - The Church of the Good Shepard was dedicated in 1876.
- 1876 -The first police officers were appointed and worked each day from 4 p.m. to 2 a.m.
- 1876 - Town Meeting established a committee to look into establishing a new cemetery.
- 1817 - Landon Moore attempted to rob the Post Office.
- 1877 - Albert W. Nickerson first arrived in Dedham in 1877.
- October 20, 1877 - Town Meeting appropriated $8,150 to purchase more than 39 acres of land to establish Brookdale Cemetery.
- July 1878 - St. Mary's Church was out of repair and had a mortgage debt of $3,000.
- October 28, 1878 - St. Raphael's Chapel was established on Thomas Street in East Dedham with the territory that had been broken off from St. Mary's. Dedicated by Archbishop Williams, St. Raphael's sat about 400 people.

=== 1880s ===
- 1880s - Father Robert J. Johnson was publicly raising the issue of discrimination against Catholics in the public schools. In 1885, as a member of the School Committee, (Note: Johnson served two terms, from 1884 to 1890.) he claimed the principal of the Avery School ridiculed Catholic students, and several years later had a lengthy debate with a Protestant minister via letters in the Dedham Standard about the "rank misrepresentation of the Catholic Church" in a history book adopted by the School Committee.
- February 1880 - It was announced that A.W. Nickerson, a Protestant who had business in Boston, had paid off St. Mary's $800 debt, allowing the congregation to commence work on a new building.
- October 17, 1880 - The cornerstone of the present St. Mary's Church was laid by Archbishop John Williams. A crowd of between 4,000 and 5,000 people attended, and special trains were run from Boston and Norwood to accommodate all those who wished to attend. It was one of the largest gatherings in Dedham's history.
- December 25, 1880 - The final fire destroyed the Phoenix Hotel. (Note: White was also the jailkeeper at the nearby Norfolk County Jail.)
- 1881 - The Boston and Providence Railroad company built a station in Dedham Square out of Dedham Granite.
- 1882 - The Dedham Water Company was chartered.
- 1884 - There were 400 students in the Sunday School classes at St. Mary's.
- 1886 - Dedham celebrated its 250th anniversary.
- 1886 - The railroad built a new bridge over High Street and placed a granite plaque there to commemorate both the new bridge and the 250th anniversary of the town's incorporation.
- 1886 - The Old Avery Oak was donated to the Dedham Historical Society.
- 1886 - Albert W. Nickerson hired Henry Hobson Richardson to build him a castle on the estate and hired Frederick Law Olmsted to do the landscaping on what was John Lothrop Motley's boyhood home.
- 1886 - The Public Library built a permanent home in 1886 at the corner of Church and Norfolk Streets using funds left by Hannah Shuttleworth. The building, made of Dedham Granite and trimmed with red sandstone, opened in 1888.
- October 24, 1886 - The first mass was said in the lower church at St. Mary's.
- October 3, 1887 - Students moved into the new high school on Bryant Street.
- December 17, 1887 - St. Raphael's Church burned to the ground and the congregation was merged back into St. Mary's.
- 1888, the 97 farms in town produced a product valued at $5,273,965, up from only $192,294 in 1885.

=== 1890s ===
- 1890 - Electric streetlights are introduced.
- 1890 - There were an estimated 2,000 parishioners at St. Mary's, including 957 Irish, 250 English-speaking Canadians, 58 French,19 Italians and 1 Portuguese.
- 1890 - St. Catherine's, by now in the separate town of Norwood, became its own parish with 1,500 parishioners.
- June 1890 - Father John H. Fleming arrived at St. Mary's and began a 33-year tenure as pastor.
- April 28, 1891 - Temperance Hall burned down.
- 1892-1895 - Following plans developed by Gridley J. F. Bryant, the courthouse was enlarged again to its present H-shaped configuration, adding wings to the southern facade that matched those added in 1863 to the north. The 1863 dome was replaced at that time with the present one, and the interior of the building was given a decorative treatment with Greek motifs.
- 1895 - Fairbanks Park was developed.
- January 11, 1895 - The citizens of the town gathered in Memorial Hall to celebrate the 250th anniversary of the founding of the first free, tax supported public school in the nation.
- 1896 - Hugh C. Robertson moved the Dedham Pottery plant from Chelsea to Dedham.
- 1897 - The firehouse on Bussey Street was constructed and the firehouse on Milton Street was discontinued.
- 1897 - Westwood broke away to become its own town.
- 1898 - The Dedham Infirmary, also known as the Poor Farm, built a home on Elm Street.

== 20th century ==
=== 1900s ===
- Around 1900 - Dr. Harry K. Shatswell of School Street built and drove a "steam powered horseless carriage" through the streets of town.
- 1900 - Theodore Burgess purchased three French automobiles for himself and his wife, who is thought to be the first woman to drive in Massachusetts.
- 1900 Louis D. Brandeis moved into 194 Village Avenue.
- 1900-1901 - William B. Gould served as commander of the Charles W. Carroll Post 144 of the Grand Army of the Republic.
- September 9, 1900 - The upper church at St. Mary's dedicated by Archbishop Williams. In addition to Williams, Archbishop Sebastiano Martinelli, the papal delegate to the United States, attended, as did Bishop Denis Mary Bradley of New Hampshire.
- 1901 - An unusual double marriage ceremony took place at St. Mary's where two sisters, Frances and Mary Curtis, married two men during a single mass.
- 1904 - The East Street home of Henry Bradford Endicott burned to the ground. The fire department was not able to get to the estate in time as they were dealing with three other fires simultaneously, including one at the fire house. Henry cleared the ashes away and built the Endicott Estate.
- 1906 - A firehouse was constructed on Westfield Street, near High Street.
- 1906 - Firefighters began wearing uniforms.
- 1907 - St. John's Church opened in Oakdale Square.

=== 1910s ===
- 1911 - The 1852 Baptist church in East Dedham added a bell tower to the church.
- 1913 - The old wooden rectory next to St. Mary's Church was town down so a new rectory could be built of Dedham Granite (Note: Parr has the date as 1915.)
- 1914 - The Riverdale Congregational Church was completed.
- 1914-1917 - During World War I, 642 men from Dedham served and 18 died.
- 1915 - A new Dedham High School opened on Whiting Ave.
- September 28, 1915 - Henry Weston Farnsworth was the first American to die in World War I.
- 1917 - William B. Gould and his sons appeared in their military uniforms in an issue of the NCAA's magazine, The Crisis.
- 1919 - Charles Logue, who built numerous churches in the Greater Boston area as well as Fenway Park, died in the arms of his son while inspecting the roof of St. Mary's.

=== 1920s ===
- 1920 - The first fire chief was appointed.
- 1920 - A man's skeleton was found hanging from a tree in the woods near Wigwam Pond.
- February 12, 1920 - Henry Bradford Endicott died and left the Endicott Estate to his widow, Louise Clapp Colburn.
- 1921 - The local American Legion post moved into the Charles and Mary Shaw House. They purchased the house with a $35,000 donation from Henry B. Endicott.
- May 31, 1921 - The Sacco and Vanzetti trial opened.
- 1922 - The Noble and Greenough School moved from Boston to Dedham.
- 1923 - After the department purchased its first police motorcycle, Abe Rafferty was appointed the first motorcycle officer.
- 1923 - A body was unearthed on the eastern shore of Wigham Pond when workers were digging a foundation for a house.
- April 28, 1923 - The morning of Fr. Fleming's funeral, St. Mary's Church was packed with "throngs" of people, including scores of priests, and dignitaries from the church, state, county, and town, as well as representatives from fraternal societies. A low mass was said at 8 am for the children of the parish, and a solemn Requiem Mass was said at 10 am.
- May 25, 1923 - William B. Gould died and was interred at Brookdale Cemetery. The Dedham Transcript reported his death under the headline "East Dedham Mourns Faithful Soldier and Always Loyal Citizen: Death Came Very Suddenly to William B. Gould, Veteran of the Civil War."
- 1927 - A stone bench and memorial plaque were installed on the site where the first settlers disembarked from their canoes.
- 1928 - A representative town meeting was established.

=== 1930s ===
- 1930s - The Recreation Department was established to build and staff three playgrounds around town.
- 1930 - The Christian Science moved from the Odd Fellows Hall, where they had been meeting since 1920, to the Masonic Hall.
- 1932, The Christian Science church bought Nathaniel Ames' house, moved it to the back of the lot, and built a new church.
- 1932 - A parochial school was started at St. Mary's by Father George P. O'Connor and run by the Sisters of St. Joseph.
- 1933 - The Department of Public Works was created.
- June 16, 1935 - The cornerstone for the new St. Mary's School was laid using the same golden trowel and ivory handle that was used in 1880 for the church.
- 1936 - During the tercentenary celebrations, Olympians Ellison "Tarzan" Brown and Johnny Kelley ran in a "mug hunt."
- 1936 - The Police Department had 18 officers.
- September 1936 - St. Mary's School completed construction.
- 1936 - St. Mary's was one of the largest parishes in the Archdiocese of Boston with 6,000 parishioners, four priests, and six nuns. The Sunday School alone had over 1,300 pupils.
- December 1938 - The cornerstone of the Christian Science church was laid.
- September 1938 - Over 450 trees on public land alone were felled by the New England Hurricane of 1938.

=== 1940s ===
- March 3, 1940 - The first service was held in the new Christian Science church.
- October 19, 1940 - A fire at the Log Cafe on Bridge Street resulted in the death of Chief Henry J. Harrigan.
- 1941 - The last blacksmith in town went out of business.
- 1941 - The first Recreation Commission was elected.
- 1942 - The Dedham Pottery company closed.
- 1943 - Father Mark C. Driscoll became pastor of St. Mary's, and two years later became a monsignor.
- 1944 Katherine Endicott inherited the Endicott Estate.

=== 1950s ===
- 1951 - The train station in Dedham Square was demolished and the stones were used to build an addition to the main branch of the Dedham Public Library.
- 1954 - The Rust Craft Greeting Card Company moved to Dedham from Kansas City.
- February 1954 - The Poor Farm closed.
- January 24, 1954 - It was announced that an increase in the school population at St. Mary's required more space.
- August 31, 1954 - Hurricane Carol knocked down the East Dedham firehouse's 80 foot bell tower.
- 1956 - The American Legion moved from the Charles and Mary Shaw House to 155 Eastern Avenue. The Dedham Public Schools then used the house as their administrative offices.
- 1957 - Joseph Demling, a resident of Macomber Terrace, walked into Town Hall with the carcass of the 35 pound bobcat. He asked for a $20 bounty on the animal, citing a by-law passed by the Town Meeting in 1734. The Town originally balked, suggesting that the animal came from Needham, but eventually paid Demling the money he requested.
- 1957 - The first transatlantic direct dial telephone call was made by Sally Reed in Dedham, Massachusetts to her penpal, Ann Morsley, in Dedham, Essex.
- 1957 Ursuline Academy moved from Boston's Back Bay to a 28-acre (110,000 m^{2}) parcel in Upper Dedham.
- 1958 - The new St. Mary's School was complete.
- 1958 - William B. Gould's diary is discovered.
- 1959 - A new Dedham High School is built at Stone Park. The old building became the Dedham Middle School.

=== 1960s ===
- 1960s - There were 10 playgrounds around town.
- 1960 - St. Susanna's parish was established to serve the needs of Riverdale Catholics. When St. Susanna's opened it had 300 families, while 2,500 stayed at St. Mary's.
- 1960 - St. Luke's Lutheran Church expanded their chapel in West Roxbury in 1917 before building a new church at 950 East Street, on the site of the former Endicott School.
- Summer 1964 - The new convent at St. Mary's was completed. When it opened on Avery Street, 15 nuns moved in and there was space for 22. The old convent was torn down, and a parking lot was put in its place.
- August 18, 1964 - A 17-year-old Dedhamite was driving in the rain and missed a left hand turn from Whiting Avenue onto East Street. His car smashed into the east wing of the Fairbanks House with the rear bumper flush with the wall. The 1957 sedan remained in the house overnight until it could be removed the next day. The accident prompted a stone wall to be erected which prevented another car from hitting the house in 1973.
- 1965 - Town Meeting voted to declare East Dedham Square "blighted" and undertake an urban renewal project. The measured passed by a single vote more than was needed to reach the two-thirds majority required. The project was scaled back from 26 to 14 acres, but nine residential properties were taken, forcing the relocation of 42 families.
- March 1, 1967 - Ma Riva's Sub Shop opened in Dedham Square. It eventually would become D'Angelos.
- March 25, 1967 - Katherine Endicott died without any children and willed the Endicott Estate to the town for "public educational purposes, public recreational purposes, or other exclusively public purposes."
- June 14, 1967 - The Flag Day Parade began, which quickly became one of Dedham's most beloved traditions.
- 1969 - Monsignor Charles F. Dewey became pastor of St. Mary's.

=== 1970s ===
- 1970s - The Dedham Pottery building burned to the ground.
- The Baptist Church in East Dedham built a new church on the same site.
- July 1972 - The Old Avery Oak was toppled in a storm, nearly striking Police Chief Walter Carroll's car.
- 1973 - It was announced that St. Mary's School would close in 1975.
- December 1973 - The Dedham Police Department investigated the sighting of several unidentified flying objects over town.
- 1975 - Father Edward Banks, S.J. arrived at St. Mary's.

=== 1980s ===
- September 1985 - A tree in front of the Dedham Historical Society, upon which hung many important notices, was toppled during Hurricane Gloria.
- 1987 - The 1835 stone mill was converted into condominiums.

=== 1990s ===
- 1990s - After sitting mostly vacant for many years, the British School of Boston, and the Rashi School, a Boston area Reform Jewish K-8 independent school, rented out St. Mary's School.
- 1992 - The Riverdale Congregational Church closed.
- 1993 - The Ames Schoolhouse was added to the National Register of Historic Places.
- 1994 - A difficult fire broke out on Rockland Street. A woman was trapped inside, and was rescued by members of Engine Company 3. The Henry J. Harrigan Medal of Honor was established to honor the members of the engine company for their bravery.
- 1994 - Roslindale's Grace Baptist Church merged with East Dedham's Baptist church, and the new congregation became known as Fellowship Bible Church.
- 1996 - Father (later bishop) John Anthony Dooher and Father Chris Hickey arrived at St. Mary's within weeks of each other. Mass attendance increased by 50% that year alone, and in 1997 it was over 2,500.

== 21st century ==
=== 2000s ===
- 2000 - Attendance at Sunday mass at St. Mary's was 2,614, making it the 11th most active parish of the 357 parishes then in the archdiocese.
- 2000 - Town Meeting created a School Building/ Rehabilitation Committee (SBRC).
- 2001-2002 - St. Mary's performed the 8th most sacraments in the Archdiocese of Boston.
- 2006 - The new Dedham Middle School was opened.
- 2007 - The Dedham High School Marauders changed their logo from a Native American to a pirate.
- August 27, 2009 - The first movie was shown at Legacy Place. The first film was Inglourious Basterds, and the first preview was for Shutter Island, a movie partially filmed in Dedham.

=== 2010s ===
- 2010 - St. Mary's School was razed.
- 2010 - St. Mary's sold the parking lot across High Street to the Town of Dedham and a housing developer. The proceeds were used to demolish the old school building, and to re-purpose the lower church. Half of the lower portion of the church became a clubhouse for the LifeTeen program, and the other half became a multipurpose gathering space known as Mary Hall.
- Fall 2010 - The Jewish Rashi School, a $30 million building on the 162-acre campus of Hebrew SeniorLife's NewBridge on the Charles, opened.
- September 2011 - A 375th Birthday Party was held at the Endicott Estate with over 7,500 people attending.
- 2012 - A new 61,000 square feet (5,700 m^{2}) Avery Elementary School was opened at a cost of $19,285,949.
- March 2012 - The Board of Selectmen created a Charter Advisory Committee to review the Town's governing document and to recommend changes.
- 2012 - Town Meeting created the Public Service Recognition Committee to recognize citizens who have performed outstanding acts of service to the community.
- 2013-2015 - Commemorating its 30th year, the James Joyce Ramble was the host for the USA Track & Field National Masters 10K Championship.
- 2013 - The Dedham Library Innovation Team began installing Little Free Libraries around Dedham.
- August 2013 - The Charter Advisory Committee presented their recommendations to the Board of Selectmen.
- Fall 2013 - Town Meeting approved all but one recommended changes to the charter, calling for term limits.
- 2014 - At the Town Election, voters approved five of six proposed amendments to the charter, with the only exception being an increase in the term of the Town Clerk from three to five years.
- November 2014 - Town Meeting rejected a $40 million proposal to buy a 490,000 square feet (46,000 m^{2}) portion of the former Rust Craft Greeting Card building at 100 Rustcraft Road for use as a Town Hall, Senior Center, and Police Station.
- November 2014 - The Town Meeting voted to purchase the 33,000 square feet (3,100 m^{2}) Ames Schoolhouse for $5.85 million and renovate it to be used as a Town Hall and Senior Center.
- 2015 - There were discussions about changing the Dedham High School logo again.
- 2015 - St Mary's was painted for the first time in 25 years.
- 2015 - Dedham Middle School Principal Debra Gatley was named the Massachusetts Secondary School Administrators' Association Principal of the Year.
- 2015, Declan Harris won the Massachusetts Interscholastic Athletic Association's state wrestling championship at the 145 pound weight class, and Eric Reyes won at the 160 pound weight class. Reyes had won at 145 pounds in 2014, and at 126 pounds in 2013.
- June 14, 2015 - The 48th annual Flag Day Parade, one of Dedham's most beloved traditions, was held with honorary Grand Marshall Bob Aldous.
- 2016 -St. Mary's had 2,700 families as parishioners.
- 2016 - Town Meeting approved an $18.9 million new Early Childhood Educational Center.
- May 20, 2017 - The Fairbanks House had a public celebration of the 400th wedding anniversary of Jonathan and Grace Fairbanks.
- June 17, 2017 - For the 50th anniversary of the Flag Day celebrations, the parade was moved from the traditional June 14, Flag Day, to Saturday, June 17 to accommodate the fireworks at Memorial Park that were part of the celebration.

=== 2020s ===
- 2020 - A new Charter Advisory Committee was appointed.
- April 2020 - The James Joyce Ramble was canceled due to the COVID-19 pandemic.
- June 19 and 20, 2020 - Most departments moved from the old town hall into the Ames Schoolhouse.
- November 9, 2020 - The Parks and Recreation Commission renamed a 1.3 acre park as the William B. Gould Memorial Park.
- 2021 - A grant from the Dedham Cultural Council enabled a restoration and maintenance plan for the Free Little Libraries that was to be implemented by Sal D'Antonia.
- March 5, 2021 - A ceremonial groundbreaking took place for the new public safety building.
- April 2021 - The James Joyce Ramble was canceled due to the COVID-19 pandemic.
- May 28, 2023 - A statue of William B. Gould was unveiled in East Dedham.

== See also ==
- History of Dedham, Massachusetts
- Timelines of other municipalities in the Greater Boston area of Massachusetts: Cambridge, Haverhill, Lawrence, Lowell, Lynn, New Bedford, Salem, Somerville, Waltham, Worcester

== Works cited ==
- Dedham Historical Society; Dedham Square Circle (2010). "Historic Dedham Village: A Self-guided Walking Tour" (PDF) (1 ed.). Town of Dedham Economic Development Department. p. 12.
- Bowers, Claude Gernade (1925). Jefferson and Hamilton: The Struggle for Democracy in America. Houghton Mifflin.
- Morris, Gouverneur (1888). The Diary and Letters of Gouverneur Morris: Minister of the United States to France... C. Scribner's Sons.
- Byrne, William; Leahy, W. A.; Dowling, Austin; Young, E. J. A.; Finen, J. E. (1899). Introductory. The Hurd & Everts co. pp. 323–324.
- Gould IV, William B. (2002). Diary of a Contraband: The Civil War Passage of a Black Sailor (paperback ed.). Stanford University Press. ISBN 0-8047-4708-3.
- Robinson, David (1985). The Unitarians and the Universalists. Greenwood Publishing Group. ISBN 0313248931.
- Alexander, Adele Logan (July 2000). Homelands and Waterways: The American Journey of the Bond Family, 1846-1926 (Amazon Kindle ed.). Knopf Doubleday Publishing Group. ISBN 978-0-307-42625-3.
- Lord, Robert Howard; Sexton, John E.; Harrington, Edward T. (1944). History of the Archdiocese of Boston, 1886-1943. Sheed & Ward.
- Johnson, Robert J.; Cooke, George Willis (1889). Sectarian School-books: A Series of Letters. A. Mudge & Son, Printers.
- Dwight, Benjamin Woodbridge (1874). The History of the Descendants of John Dwight, of Dedham, Mass. J. F. Trow & son, printers and bookbinders.
- Abbott, Katharine M. (1903). Old Paths And Legends Of New England (PDF). New York: The Knickerbocker Press. pp. 290–297.
- Burgess, Ebenezer (1840). Dedham Pulpit: Or, Sermons by the Pastors of the First Church in Dedham in the XVIIth and XVIIIth Centuries. Perkins & Marvin.
- Hurd, Duane Hamilton (1884). History of Norfolk County, Massachusetts: With Biographical Sketches of Many of Its Pioneers and Prominent Men. J. W. Lewis & Company.
- Slafter, Carlos (1905). A Record of Education: The Schools and Teachers of Dedham, Massachusetts 1644-1904. Dedham Transcript Press. "1642-3."
- Slack, Charles (2015). Liberty's First Crisis: Adams, Jefferson, and the Misfits Who Saved Free Speech. Atlantic Monthly Press. ISBN 978-0802123428.
- Steinberg, Theodore (January 29, 2004). Nature Incorporated: Industrialization and the Waters of New England. Cambridge University Press. ISBN 9780521527118.
- Tritsch, Electa Kane (1986). Building Dedham. Dedham Historical Society.
- Dedham Historical Society (2001). Images of America: Dedham. Arcadia Publishing. ISBN 978-0-7385-0944-0.
- Hanson, Robert Brand (1976). Dedham, Massachusetts, 1635-1890. Dedham Historical Society.
- Parr, James L. (2009). Dedham: Historic and Heroic Tales From Shiretown. The History Press. ISBN 978-1-59629-750-0.
- Smith, Frank (1936). A History of Dedham, Massachusetts. Transcript Press, Incorporated.
- Lockridge, Kenneth (1985). A New England Town. New York: W.W. Norton & Company. ISBN 978-0-393-95459-3.
- Lockridge, Kenneth A.; Kreider, Alan (1966). "The Evolution of Massachusetts Town Government, 1640 to 1740". The William and Mary Quarterly. 23 (4): 549–574. doi:10.2307/1919125. JSTOR 1919125.
- Brown, Richard D.; Tager, Jack (2000). Massachusetts: A concise history. University of Massachusetts Press. ISBN 978-1558492493.
- Barber, John Warner (1848). Historical Collections: Being a General Collection of Interesting Facts, Traditions, Biographical Sketches, Anecdotes, &c., Relating to the History and Antiquities of Every Town in Massachusetts, with Geographical Descriptions. Lazell. pp. 455–463.
- Worthington, Erastus (1827). The history of Dedham: from the beginning of its settlement, in September 1635, to May 1827. Dutton and Wentworth.
- Worthington, Erastus (1900). Historical sketch of Mother Brook, Dedham, Mass: compiled from various records and papers, showing the diversion of a portion of the Charles River into the Neponset River and the manufactures on the stream, from 1639 to 1900. Dedham, MA: C.G. Wheeler.
- Levy, Barry (1997). "Girls and Boys: Poor Children and the Labor Market in Colonial Massachusetts". Pennsylvania History: A Journal of Mid-Atlantic Studies. 64: 287–307. JSTOR 27774064.
- Lamson, Alvan (1839). A History of the First Church and Parish in Dedham, in Three Discourses. Herman Mann.
- Simon, James F. (March 10, 2003). What Kind of Nation: Thomas Jefferson, John Marshall, and the Epic Struggle to Create a United States. Simon and Schuster. ISBN 978-0-684-84871-6.
