= Aquinas College (Massachusetts) =

Historic women's college, 1956–2000

Coordinates: 42°21′27.3″N 71°11′39.5″W

- Type: Women's private college
- Active: 1956–2000
- Location: Milton and Newton, Massachusetts, USA
- Language: English

Aquinas College was a private women's college in Milton, Massachusetts, and 15 Walnut Park, Newton, Massachusetts. It was closed in 2000.

Its Newton campus was then used by The Rashi School, the Boston-area Reform Jewish K-8 Independent School. The school became vacant again when The Rashi School moved to their permanent home in nearby Dedham, Massachusetts, in 2010. In 2015, the city of Newton purchased the property to "house the preschool program and create additional school space to relieve overcrowding and facilities issues at several elementary schools".

Records are available at: Registrar's Office, Regis College, Box 15, 235 Wellesley Street, Weston, MA 02493.
