= History of Dedham, Massachusetts =

The History of Dedham, Massachusetts may refer to:

- The history of Dedham by time:
  - History of Dedham, Massachusetts, 1635–1699
  - History of Dedham, Massachusetts, 1700-1799
  - History of Dedham, Massachusetts, 1800–1899
  - History of Dedham, Massachusetts, 1900–1999
  - History of Dedham, Massachusetts, 2000–present
  - Timeline of Dedham, Massachusetts
- The history of Dedham by topic:
  - History of education in Dedham, Massachusetts
  - History of rail in Dedham, Massachusetts
  - Lifestyles of early settlers of Dedham, Massachusetts
  - Early government of Dedham, Massachusetts
- The history of Dedham by war:
  - Dedham, Massachusetts in the American Revolution
  - Dedham, Massachusetts in the American Civil War
