= Dedham Fire Department =

Fire department in Massachusetts, US

Operational area
- Country: US
- State: Massachusetts
- Town: Dedham

Agency overview
- Established: 1858
- Employees: 68 (2023)
- Annual budget: $7,925,821 (2023)
- Staffing: Career
- Fire chief: Bob DeVincent
- IAFF: 1735

Facilities and equipment
- Stations: 2
- Engines: 3

Website
- Official website
- IAFF website

The Dedham Fire Department is the fire department for Dedham, Massachusetts.

== History ==
=== Early history ===
A vote of Town Meeting to purchase a bell for the meetinghouse was made in 1648, but a bell was not hung until February 1652. The bell was rung not only to alert residents of a fire, but also to announce the start of public meetings, to announce a death, and to signal the start of church services.

In the 1600s, each resident was cautioned to keep a ladder handy in case he may need to put out a fire on his thatched roof or climb out of harm's way should there be an attack from the Indians. It was also decreed that if any man should tie his horse to the ladder against the meetinghouse then he would be fined sixpence.

In 1796, a new company was charted by the General Court granting Calvin Whiting the right to deliver water from Federal Hill to houses in the High Street and Franklin Square areas using hollowed out pine logs. The water cost $5 a year and was transported to homes in pipes made of hollow pine logs. The flow was not sufficient to bring it into the second story of a house, or to put out a fire.

=== Connecticut Corner ===
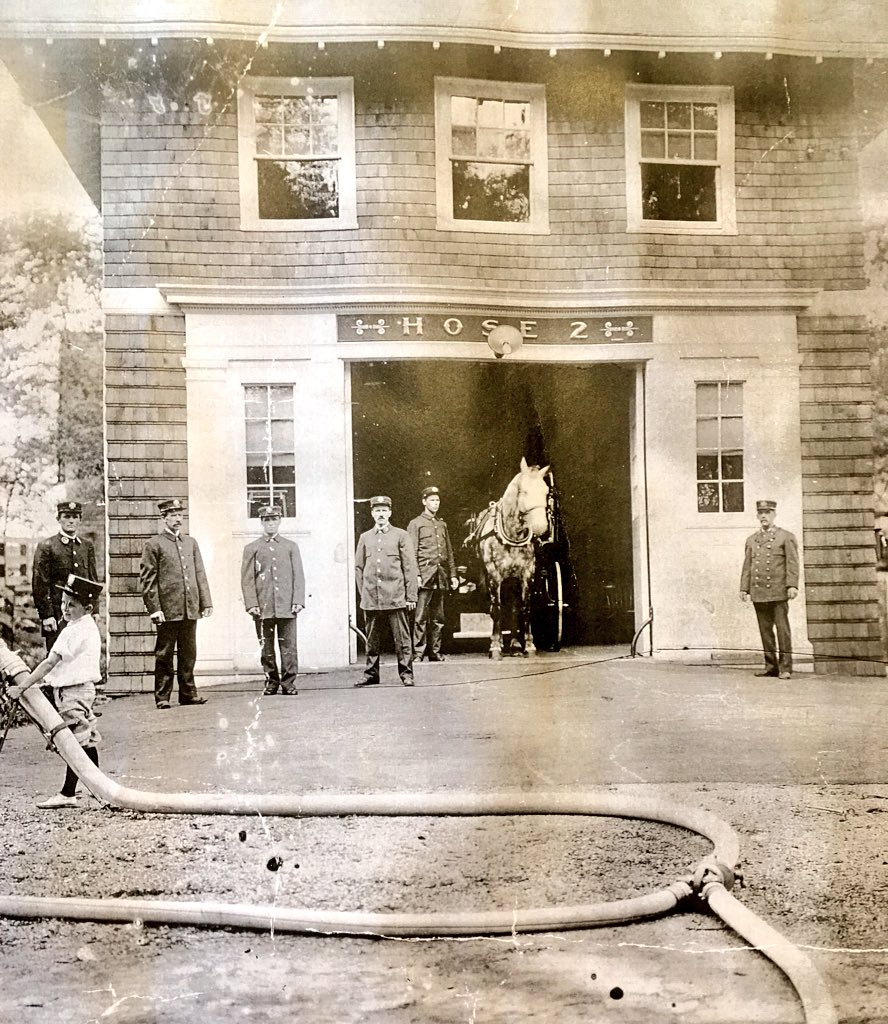
The firehouse on Westfield Street.

A fire truck made by Paul Revere was purchased by a group of citizens and donated to the Town in 1800 as "a public utility and a very great security against the calamities of fire." It was known as Hero No. 1. It was stationed at the Connecticut Corner firehouse.

A firehouse was constructed on Westfield Street, near High Street, in 1906. The lower level had horse stalls, a stable room, a hose wagon, and engine room, and an opening to the paddock in the rear. The second story had a sleeping room, a company room, a lavatory, a bath, and a hay and grain room. The building housed horse drawn steamer engines. It went out of service sometime in the 20th century, but still exists as a private residence.

=== Central village ===
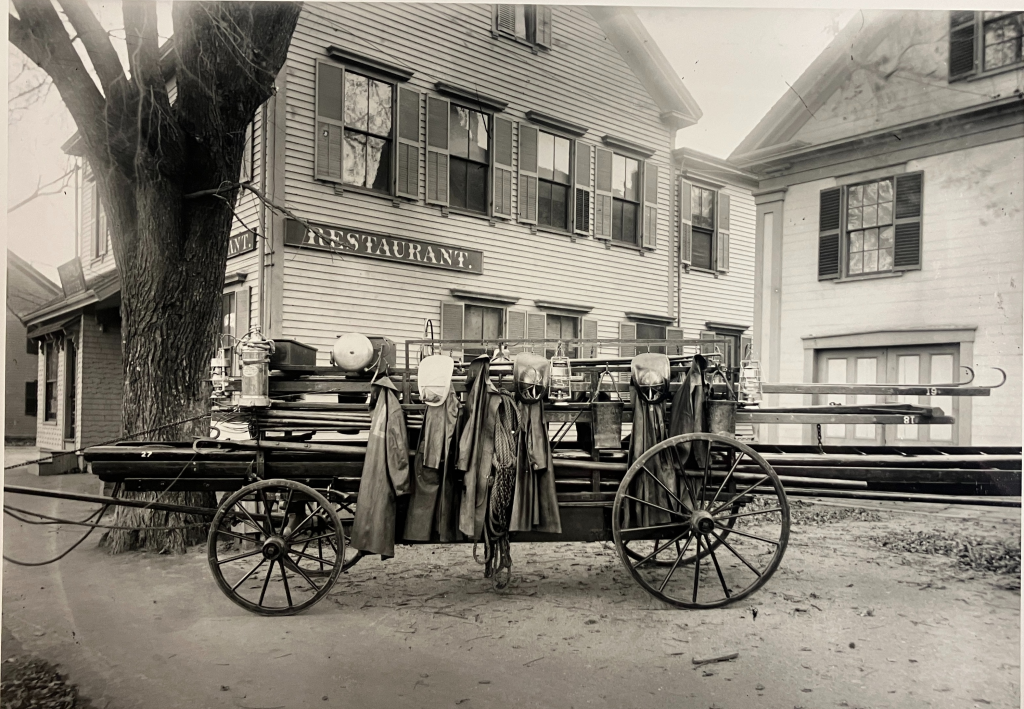
The original Water Witch and its engine house which stood on Washington Street near School Street.

A second hand tub, the Good Intent No. 2, was purchased in 1802 and stationed in the central village. The third engine, the Enterprise, was purchased in 1826 for the central village. In 1831, Town Meeting purchased eight more engines, including the Niagara and Water Witch, for the central village. The Water Witch's engine house stood on Washington Street, near School Street.

The central fire house was built at the corner of Washington and Bryant Streets. It housed Steamer Number 1, Hose Number 1, and Hook and Ladder Number 1. Both Hose Number 1, which carried 1,000' of hose, and Hook and Ladder Number 1, were drawn by two horses.

=== East Dedham ===
A firehouse in East Dedham was constructed in 1846 on Milton Street near the Old Stone Mill. (Note: A statue of William B. Gould is now on the site.) Hose Number 3 (Note: Hose No. 3, which had 300' of house, was built by J.V. Fell, J. Wally & Brother, and J. Lynas.) was purchased by the town for the Milton Street station in 1891. That building also housed a supply wagon.

On November 25, 1895, Town Meeting had a "long, lively and at times laughable discussion" regarding the needs of the fire department in East Dedham. It was ultimately voted to appropriate $3,000 to purchase a lot on Bussey Street from Edgar Harding for the purposes of housing the fire house there instead of on Milton Street. However, they rejected a motion to appropriate $300 to move the fire house from Milton Street to the new lot and instead referred the matter back to a committee. The firehouse on Bussey Street went into service in 1897 and Hose No. 3 was moved to this location.

The East Dedham firehouse had a bell that rang out when a fire was in progress. On Christmas Eve, 1880, the Church of the Good Shepherd in Oakdale Square's new bell was rung for the first time. As the sound the bell made was similar to the sound the Fire Department's bell made, a crowd gathered and expected to see a conflagration.

Hurricane Carol knocked down the firehouse's 80-foot bell tower on August 31, 1954. It flew across the station and landed on 219 Bussey St, the house next door, where Maria Guerriero was feeding her one-year-old son, Joseph. It also crushed three cars parked on Bussey St.

On the first Sunday of December, a truck from the East Dedham station brings Santa Claus to the Civitarese-Cushman House for the lighting of their annual Christmas light display.

== Modernization ==
In the early days of fire services in Dedham, each engine had its own company of men attached to it and keen was the rivalry existing between the organizations. The Norfolk House was often selected for the annual meetings and dinners of the different companies.

In 1858, the Fire Department was first organized. The first steam engine was purchased in 1872. The Dedham Water Company was founded in 1882, and provided hydrants for firefighters to use. Prior to their introduction, those attempting to put out fires were dependent upon private wells, small town reservoirs scattered around town, and streams and rivers.

Starting in 1905, the Dedham Fireman's Relief Association starting hosting an annual fundraiser at Memorial Hall to benefit firefighters who were injured or killed in the line of duty. (Note: The fundraisers continued for at least 8 years.) The first professional fire chief was appointed in 1920. Prior to that there was a four-member Board of Fire Engineers who had charge over fires.

Chief Henry J. Harrigan oversaw the changeover from horse-drawn apparatus to motorized trucks in 1919. Firefighters began wearing uniforms in 1906.

As of 2016, the department still used a telegraph system to report instances of fire. Each of the several fire alarm call boxes has a unique number associated with it and the department may sound a horn to announce the location of the fire, or other information. If the horn sounds box 2-2-2-2, that means the Dedham Public Schools have been canceled due to snow.

== Modern stations ==
Today, the department has two stations: one in Dedham Square and one in East Dedham.

=== Public Safety Building ===
After most of the Town's administrative offices move into the Ames Schoolhouse, the town hall was demolished and a combined public safety building for both the Dedham Police Department and Fire Department was built.

On March 5, 2021, a ceremonial groundbreaking took place for the new building. The new building at 26 Bryant Street was opened for the first time on March 12, 2023. The public was invited to take tours following the ribbon cutting.

Inside the statue of William B. Gould are three photos of the ribbon cutting of the Public Safety Building. (Note: The first photo shows Deputy Police Chief Mike Buckley, State Representative Paul McMurtry, Select board member Erin Boles Welch, Select board member Kevin Coughlin, Select board member Dennis Teehan Jr., Select board member Dimitria Sullivan, Joe Albanese from Commodore Builders, retired firefighter John Brown. The second shows retired firefighter John Brown, James MacDonald, Select board member Jim MacDonald, retired Fire Chief Jim Driscoll, retired firefighter Artie Kirohn, retired firefighter Kenny Pike, retired Deputy Fire Chief John Fontaine, retired firefighter Bob Reissfelder, and retired firefighter Al Romanish. The third shows retired Deputy Fire Chief John Fontaine, retired firefighter Bob Reissfelder, retired firefighter Al Romanish, former Select board member Mike Butler, Town Manager Leon Goodwin, Planning board member Jessica Porter, Building, Planning, and Construction Committee chairman Jim Sullivan, Police Chief Mike D’Entremont, Fire Chief Bill Spilanne, Assistant Town Manager Nancy Baker, retired Police Chief Dennis Teehan Sr., Business Manager for the Police Department Karen Camerano.)

== Notable fires ==
=== 1800s ===
- October 30, 1832 – A fire broke out in the stables of what would become the Phoenix hotel and destroyed both.
- January 7, 1834 – There was another fire in the stables at the Phoenix Hotel.
- Dedham station burned down in 1837, destroying a great deal of rolling stock in the process, and necessitating a temporary return to horses instead of steam engines.
- A second fire at Dedham station occurred in 1849, leaving only the walls standing.
- January 7, 1850 – A third fire broke out at the Phoenix Hotel.
- The Maverick Woolen Mill suffered two fires, one in 1854 and one in 1859. The 1854 fire destroyed a storehouse, a press room, and an office. The later fire caused $75,000 in damage when it burned down two wooden structures that housed the spinning and carding departments and a dye house. It also destroyed a four boiler engine that produced 40 horsepower along with the gas element. The Dedham Gas Company was located next door to the mill.
- December 25, 1880 – The final fire destroyed the Phoenix Hotel.

=== 1900s ===
- For most of the 20th century, youth would steal (and later construct their own) farm wagons and burn them in Oakdale Square to celebrate the 4th of July. The fires would often grow so large and so intense that windows in the Square would crack and tar would melt.
- A 1904 fire burned the home of Henry Bradford Endicott on East Street burn to the ground. The fire department was not able to get to the estate in time as they were dealing with three other fires simultaneously, including one at the fire house.
- In 1905, arsonists set Ashcroft station ablaze twice in two weeks.
- During the lunch break at the Cochrane Mill, a fire broke out on April 4, 1911 that quickly engulfed the mill. There were 25 employees inside, including one who was taking a nap.
- The dry meadows fire in 1923 burned for weeks.
- Ashcroft station was destroyed by arson on June 29, 1937.
- At the 1940 Log Cafe fire, Chief Henry J. Harrigan was killed when the floor he was standing on collapsed.
- Another fire broke out in the mill on May 2, 1984. This time, the mill was owned by the United Waste Company.
- After the Rockland Street fire in 1993, the Henry J. Harrigan Medal of Honor was established to honor the bravery of the members of Engine three. One of the recipients was William Spillane, who would go on to become chief of the department.

=== 2000s ===
- Following a 2015 fire on Harding Terrace, two more members of the department, Lieutenant William Walsh and Firefighter Jared Blaney, were awarded the Harrigan Medal of Honor.
- The owner of the home at 147 Turner Street was able to get out of the house when it caught on fire on December 8, 2024, but his cats were not. The Dedham Fire Department was able to rescue them.
- When the home at 29 Granite Street caught fire on February 10, 2025, the owner was able to get outside but then became trapped in the backyard. Firefighters were able to rescue her and bring her to safety.

== Chiefs ==
Name	Years of service	Notes
Augustus Bradford Endicott		First chief of the department.
George A. Guild	1877–1892	(Note: Descendant of John Guild, one of Dedham's first settlers. At age 17, he joined Hero Company One. Starting in 1859, he operated a jewelry shop in the old Dixon house on High Street in Dedham Square. In 1891, he moved to Washington Street when Dedham Savings demolished the building to construct 601–603 High Street. The watch sign that hung above his shop window is now in the collection of the Dedham Museum and Archive. He retired in June 1901 and died on November 18, 1901.)
Everett J. Winn		
Henry J. Harrigan	(Note: Chief by 1913.)–1940	
John Hartnett	c. 1960s	
John O’Brien		
Jack Donovan		
Robert Cullinane		
James Driscoll	–2009	(Note: Became lieutenant in 1978 and was named Acting Fire Chief in 2001.)
William Cullinane	2009–2014	(Note: Joined the department in September 1978. He was promoted to lieutenant in 1997, deputy chief in 1999, and chief in the summer of 2009.)
William Spillane	December 29, 2014–April 30, 2026	(Note: Joined the department in 1984 and was promoted to lieutenant in 1999. He was appointed Acting Chief on August 13, 2012 and sworn in as permanent chief on December 29, 2014.)
Bob DeVincent	May 1, 2026-present	

== Henry J. Harrigan Medal of Honor ==
In 1994, a difficult fire broke out on Rockland Street. A woman was trapped inside, and was rescued by members of Engine Company 3. The Henry J. Harrigan Medal of Honor was established to honor the members of the engine company for their bravery. The medal was awarded for a second time in 2015 to Lieutenant William Walsh and Firefighter Jared Blaney for "going above and beyond the call of duty and putting themselves at extreme risk" by entering a burning building on Harding Terrace to save a victim trapped inside.

A plaque was unveiled in Harrigan's honor outside the main firehouse on October 18, 2015, the 75th anniversary of his death, in a ceremony organized by Deputy Chief John Fontaine. (Note: Fontaine credited his wife, Mary, with doing much of the research.)

Both Harrigan and Joseph C. Nagle, who pulled Harrigan from the blaze, were posthumously awarded the Medal of Honor. Harrigan's granddaughter, Joan Sullivan Gray, accepted the award on his behalf. Nagle's daughter, Ellen Rea, accepted the award on his behalf. The ceremony was attended by three former fire chiefs, several retired members of the department, as well as six selectmen, a state senator, a state representative, and the assistant town manager.

== Works cited ==
- Abbott, Katharine M. (1903). Old Paths And Legends Of New England (PDF). New York: The Knickerbocker Press. pp. 290–297.
- Austin, Walter (1912). Tale of a Dedham Tavern: History of the Norfolk Hotel, Dedham, Massachusetts. Priv. print. at the Riverside Press.
- Clarke, Wm. Horatio (1903). Mid-Century Memories of Dedham. Dedham Historical Society.
- Cook, Louis Atwood (1918). History of Norfolk County, Massachusetts, 1622–1918. Vol. 1. S.J. Clarke publishing Company. p. 425.
- Dedham Historical Society (2001). Images of America: Dedham. Arcadia Publishing. ISBN 978-0-7385-0944-0.
- Dedham Tercentenary Committee (1936). Dedham Tercentenary 1636-1936. The Transcript Press.
- Hanson, Robert Brand (1976). Dedham, Massachusetts, 1635–1890. Dedham Historical Society.
- Neiswander, Judith (2024). Mother Brook and the Mills of East Dedham. Damianos Publishing. ISBN 978-1-941573-66-2.
- Parr, James L. (2009). Dedham: Historic and Heroic Tales From Shiretown. The History Press. ISBN 978-1-59629-750-0.
- Smith, Frank (1936). A History of Dedham, Massachusetts. Transcript Press, Incorporated.
- Warren, Charles (1931). Jacobin and Junto: Or, Early American Politics as Viewed in the Diary of Dr. Nathaniel Ames, 1758–1822. Harvard University Press.
