= Civitarese-Cushman House =

Coordinates: 42°15′06″N 71°09′01″W

The Civitarese-Cushman House is a home in East Dedham, Massachusetts known for its elaborate Christmas light displays.

The house, located at 121 Garfield Avenue, was first decorated by Nick and Roberta Civaterese in 1973. The tradition was continued after their death by their daughter, Rita-Mae Cushman. As of 2003, four generations of the family were involved in setting up the display. The family begins in August, on Nick Civitarese's birthday, by pulling out the lights and checking the bulbs. It takes three months to assemble the display.

The family allows public access to the yard for viewing of the lights. Cushman will often stand outside in the yard at night, greeting visitors and offering them hot chocolate and cookies. Generations of families have come to see the displays, with parents who came as children often bringing their own children. Families will often take photos in the yard that they then use as their Christmas cards.

New lights were added to the display every year until 2020, when the house's electrical system maxed out. The display now constitutes thousands of lights, inflatables, figurines, dolls, music, and other decorations. The family has so many decorations that not all of them can be put out. The electrical bill rises significantly, which upsets Cushman's husband, but she tells him that "I don't drink, I don't smoke, I don't go places anymore. This is my big joy, my big pleasure."

The lights are lit on the first Sunday of December and stay lit for a few days after Christmas. On opening day, the Dedham Fire Department brings Santa Claus on a firetruck to greet children and allow them to sit in the large sleigh in the backyard. Santa then returns on the other Sundays of December as well.

== Legacy ==
December 3, 2023, the opening day of the 50th season, was declared to be Rita Mae Cushman Day in Dedham by act of Town Meeting and proclamation of the Select Board. Cushman won the 2016 Public Service Recognition Award in part for her efforts decorating her home and the greater East Dedham community.
