= Public Service Recognition Award =

Service award in Dedham, Massachusetts

The Public Service Recognition Award is an honor bestowed by the Town of Dedham, Massachusetts to recognize citizens who have performed outstanding acts of service to the community. It is presented "to a citizen or citizens of Dedham who by his/her actions best exemplifies the spirit of public service through their sharing of time, talent, and energy for the betterment of our Community." Winners receive an original painting of the Fairbanks House, America's oldest timber-frame house.

The founding chairman of the committee has said that "There are far too many unsung heroes in our community. Our goal is to sing some of their praises and give them the recognition they deserve for the good works they do day in and day out." Donald Gosselin, the first recipient of the award, said in his acceptance speech that "Any program that encourages volunteering is a great benefit to our community." He added that there wasn't "enough capacity in this auditorium" to recognize all of the volunteers in town.

In 2012, Town Meeting created the Public Service Recognition Committee to select the winner and present the award immediately before the Spring Annual Town Meeting. This committee has seven members, appointed by the Town Moderator, with one from each of the town's seven precincts. Nominations are solicited from members of the public.

== Winners ==
Year	Adult	Youth
2013	Donald Gosselin	Not awarded
2014	Amy Black	Caroline Bell
2015	Bill Podolski	Not awarded
2016	Rita Mae Cushman	Jakob Farnham and Kyle Fonseca
2017	Tim Kelleher	
2018	Dimitria Sullivan	Eric and Jack Linari
2024	Carol Flavell	Lauren Peloquin
2025	Bob LoPorto	Christopher Figueroa

== Committee chairmen ==
Year	Chairman
2013	Brian Keaney
2014	Susan Fay
2015	Susan Fay
2016	Marianne Martin
2018	Cheryl Schoenfeld
2024	Alison Sullivan
