= James Joyce Ramble =

10-km race in Dedham, Massachusetts, US

- Location: Dedham, Massachusetts (United States)
- Distance: 10 km (6.2 mi)
- Established: 1984
- Participants: 2,000

The James Joyce Ramble is a 10-kilometer race held in Dedham, Massachusetts, a suburb of Boston. The race is held each year in April, following soon after the Boston Marathon. The race is named for Irish writer James Joyce, and actors are hired to recite the works of Joyce along the course as runners and walkers pass by. The race now draws over 2,000 runners each year, many of whom stick around the Boston area after the Boston Marathon.

== History ==
The race was created in 1984, by founder Martin Casimir Hanley of Dedham. At the time, he was reading Joyce's comic novel Finnegans Wake and found the book as difficult as running a road race. The first race was held on March 26, 1984, with a total of 244 runners. Starting in 1989, the race began to have a human rights focus as well, raising money for a different human rights charity each year.

== Course ==
The 10K race loops around Dedham. The race starts and finishes at the Endicott Estate. Participants venture down High Street and Highland Street as they approach Noble and Greenough School. The runners then soon encounter Dedham Square, the home to many local businesses, the Dedham Historical Society, and the Norfolk Superior Court. The participants then pass the Fairbanks House on the corner of Whiting Avenue and East Street. Built in 1637 this house is the oldest wood-framed house still standing in North America. Turning on to East Street, top runners will return to the Endicott Estate to cross the finish line approximately a half-hour after the start of the race.

== Joyce readings along the course ==
Costumed actors read James Joyce works along the racecourse. When the race was initiated in the 1980s, there was approximately one reader per mile. Now, there are as many as 35 readers each year, spread out along the course. Six Joycean works have been selected, and the story being told changes each of the six miles of the race. The works, in the order in which they are read are: Finnegans Wake, Ulysses, A Portrait of the Artist as a Young Man, Exiles, Dubliners, and "The Dead".

In 2014, to celebrate the 100th anniversary of the publishing of Dubliners, three dozen actors read from the book.

== Related events ==
=== Take A Walk ===
In conjunction with the James Joyce Ramble, there is an event called “Take a Walk” to benefit the Dana Farber Cancer Institute. The walk has the same starting line as the race (Endicott Estate) and participants collect pledges for the cancer institute. Top fundraising participants receive gift certificates to local merchants.

=== The North Star Children’s Ramble ===
A literary-themed race for children ages 4–12 on the same day as the James Joyce Ramble, which is named after Dedham resident and best-selling children's book author/illustrator Peter H. Reynolds. The race is held at the Endicott Estate, with short dashes for younger children, and laps around the perimeter of the estate for older children. Originally overseen by the Dedham Youth Commission, the race is now run by the non-profit Reynolds Center for Teaching, Learning & Creativity. Each participant receives a goody bag, with a variety of items, including a book.

=== Post-race ===
After the race, there is an awards ceremony complete with winner recognition, prize money (varying each year), and refreshments. There are often local musicians performing after the race as well.

== Sponsors ==
Annual sponsors of the event have included Subaru of New England, Dedham Savings Bank, FableVision, Harpoon Brewery, National Amusements, and The Norfolk & Dedham Group.

== Philanthropies the race supports ==
Since 1989, part of the James Joyce Ramble's mission has been the protection of human rights. Organizers have supported such controversial writers as Václav Havel, Xu Wenli, Burma's Aung San Suu Kyi, and many others. Since the start of the Iraq War, the Ramble has turned their human rights focus to the support of journalists, including the late Daniel Pearl of The Wall Street Journal and Jill Carroll of the Christian Science Monitor. The organizers of the James Joyce Ramble have made great strides to help protect the First Amendment rights of journalists all over the world. Besides fighting for human rights, all the financial proceeds from the race, Take a Walk and the Children's Ramble are donated to the Dana Farber Cancer Institute.

== National status ==
Commemorating its 30th year, the James Joyce Ramble in 2013, 2014, 2015, 2016 and 2017 was the host for the USA Track & Field National Masters 10K Championship.
