= Henry J. Harrigan =

Henry J. Harrigan (circa 1873-1940) was the first permanent fire chief of the Dedham Fire Department in Dedham, Massachusetts.

== Fire department ==
As the first permanent chief of the department, Harrigan succeeded Everett J. Winn.

Harrigan oversaw the changeover from horse-drawn appartatus to motorized trucks in 1919. At a convention of fire chiefs from around New England, Harrigan spoke of the importance of constructing water wells as an aid in fighting forest fires. Years later, at the request of a government engineer, he identified several spots away from hydrants where holes could be dug and then fed with riverlets and springs.

During the Dedham's tercentenary celebrations in 1936, Harrigan and the rest of the department led a group of nearly 20 fire trucks from around the Commonwealth in a parade.

== Log Cafe fire ==
Shortly after 2am on October 19, 1940, a fire at the Log Cafe on Bridge Street was called in. The fire destroyed the Cafe and Breed's boathouse. The high winds fanned the flames and fire departments from Boston and Needham arrived on scene to assist.

Knowing that those under his command, many with wives and children, were inside the building, Harrigan entered to inspect the progress of the fire. The floor beneath him gave way, causing him to fall 15 feet, stunning him and causing him to become overcome by smoke and heat. Fireman Joseph C. Nagle, "despite the blinding smoke and flames, rushed into the building and carried Chief Harrigan outside, "suffering burns and smoke inhalation in the process.

Nagle was brought to the Dedham Emergency Hospital, and a firefighter worked on Harrigan with a pulmanator before he was taken to the Faulkner Hospital by several police officers in an ambulance. Harrigan, a 47-year veteran of the force, died slightly after 4am. Harrigan's funeral at St. Mary's Church was attended by 1,500 people, including chiefs from 100 cities and towns.

== Personal life ==
Harrigan's parents were born in Ireland, but he was born in Dedham. He attended the Dedham Public Schools. He married Mary Loiuse Maher of Malden; together they had four daughters. In addition to being a firefighter, he also worked as a blacksmith.

== Legacy ==
In 1994, a difficult fire broke out on Rockland Street. A woman was trapped inside, and was rescued by members of Engine Company 3. The Henry J. Harrigan Medal of Honor was established to honor the members of the engine company for their bravery. (Note: The medal was awarded for a second time in 2015 to Lieutenant William Walsh and Firefighter Jared Blaney for "going above and beyond the call of duty and putting themselves at extreme risk" by entering a burning building on Harding Terrace to save a victim trapped inside.)

A plaque was unveiled in his honor outside the main firehouse on October 18, 2015, the 75th anniversary of his death, in a ceremony organized by Deputy Chief John Fontaine. (Note: Fontaine credited his wife, Mary, with doing much of the research.) Both Harrigan and Nagle were posthumously awarded the Medal of Honor. Harrigan's granddaughter, Joan Sullivan Gray, accepted the award on his behalf. (Note: Nagle's daughter, Ellen Rea, accepted the award on his behalf.) The ceremony was attended by three former fire chiefs, several retired members of the department, as well as six selectmen, a state senator, a state representative, and the assistant town manager.

At the ceremony, Chief William Spillane, himself a winner of the Harrigan Medal of Honor, said Harrigan exemplified the qualities of a natural leader and a firefighter.”

== Works cited ==
- Smith, Frank (1936). A History of Dedham, Massachusetts. Transcript Press, Incorporated.
