= Rashi School =

PreK-8 Reform Jewish Independent School in Dedham, Massachusetts

The Rashi School
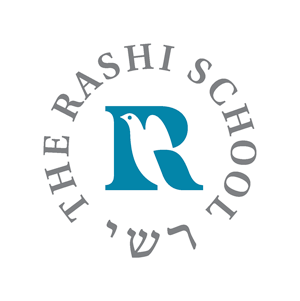

Location
- Dedham, Massachusetts
- Coordinates: 42.2676°N 71.1971°W

Information
- Established: 1986
- Head of school: Emily Charton
- Grades: PreK-8
- Enrollment: 230+
- Team name: The Rashi Rams
- Website: The Rashi School

The Rashi School is an independent, Reform Jewish private school in Dedham, Massachusetts. It offers both secular and Jewish education. Founded in 1986, the school currently enrolls more than 230 students in grades Pre-K–8. As of 2025, the student-teacher ratio was 6:1.

== Etymology ==
The school is named after Shlomo Yitzchaki, an Ashkenazi rabbi who is typically known today by the acronym Rashi. He was a medieval French rabbi and author of a comprehensive commentary on the Talmud and Torah.

== History ==
In 1982, Rabbi Henry Zoob formed a committee to explore interest in a Jewish Reform day school. After a four-year planning process, the Rashi School opened in 1986, enrolling 16 students in kindergarten and first grade.

In 1999, the Rashi School introduced its core values: Ruach (Spirit), Kavod (Respect), Kehillah (Community), Tzedek (Justice), and Limud (Learning).

In 2006, the school's eighth-grade class took its first trip to Israel. The trip is now an annual tradition and a culminating event of Jewish Studies at the Rashi School.

In 2010, The Rashi School moved to its permanent campus in a wooded 162 acre site on the banks of the Charles River, within Newbridge on the Charles Campus for Hebrew Senior Life.

== Location ==
=== Past locations of The Rashi School ===
1986–1988	Temple Shalom, Newton
1988–1989	Bigelow Middle School, Newton
1989–1993	Mishkan Tefila, Chestnut Hill
1993–1998	High Rock School, Needham
1998–2000	Former St. Mary's School, Dedham
2000–2010	Walnut Park / Jackson Road, Newton
2010–Present	NewBridge on the Charles Campus, Dedham

=== Dedicated location ===
The school's permanent location on the Hebrew Senior Life campus was opened on October 17, 2010.

The building is a LEED (Leadership in Energy and Environmental Design)-certified "green" building.

== Heads of School ==
1986–1992	Rabbi Richard "Rim" Meirowitz
1992–2002	Jennifer Miller
2002–2003	Shlomit Lipton (interim)
2003–2008	Rabbi Joe Eiduson
2008–2015	Matt King, Ed.D.
2015–2018	Mallory Rome
2018–2019	Robert "Bud" Lichtenstein (interim)
2019–2024	Adam W. Fischer
2024–Present	Emily Charton

== See also ==
- History of education in Dedham, Massachusetts
