= Ames Schoolhouse =

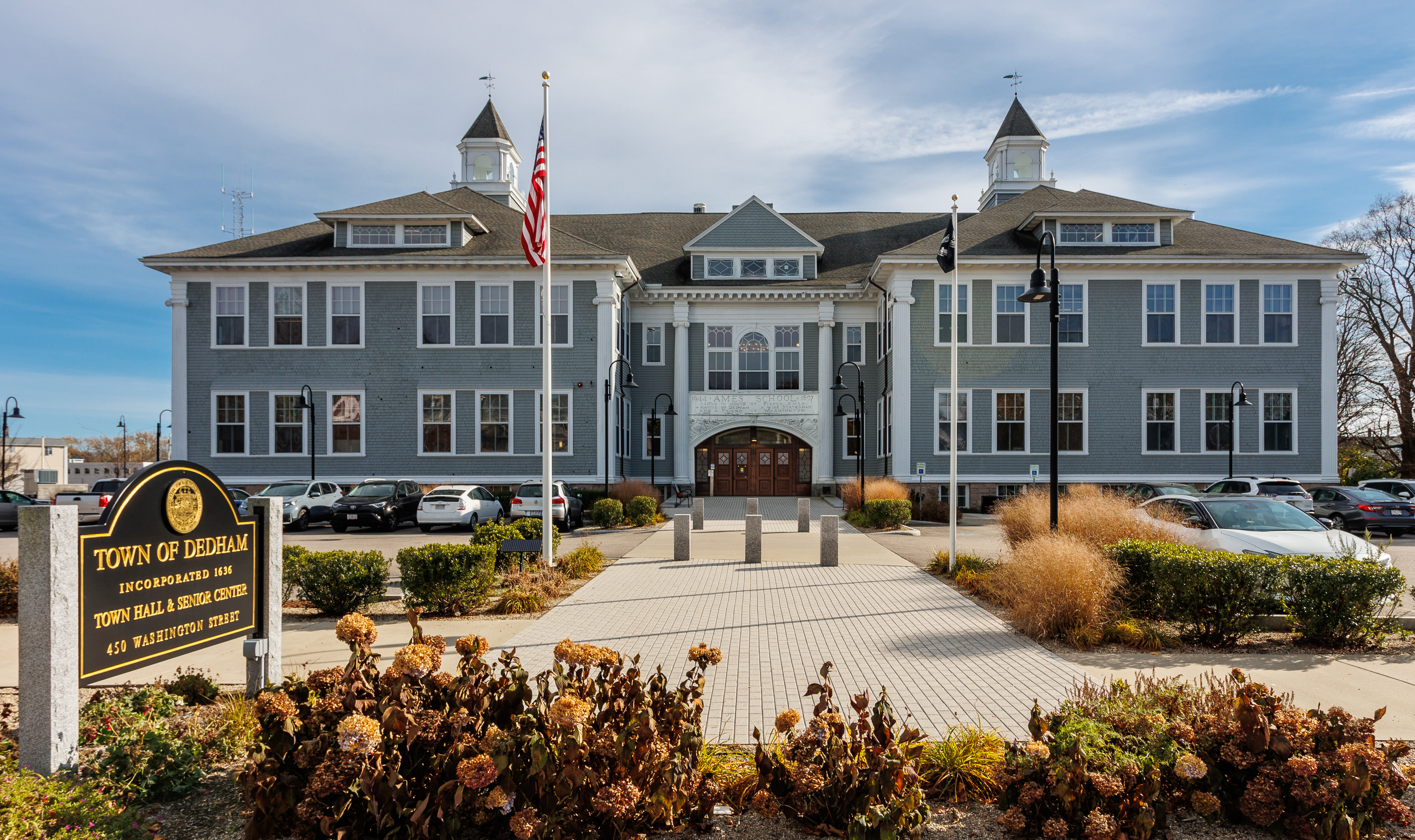
- Interactive map of the Ames Schoolhouse area

General information
- Architectural style: Colonial Revival; Shingle Style
- Location: 450 Washington St., Dedham, Massachusetts, United States
- Construction started: 1897
- Completed: June 1898
- Renovated: 2016-2017
- Owner: Town of Dedham

Technical details
- Floor count: 3
- Floor area: 33,000 sq. ft.

Design and construction
- Architects: Luther Greenleaf; Albert W. Cobb

Renovating team
- Renovating firm: Turowski2 Architecture
- Ames Schoolhouse
- U.S. National Register of Historic Places
- Location within Massachusetts Location within the United States
- Coordinates: 42°14′43″N 71°10′29″W
- Built: 1898
- Architect: Greenleaf, Luther; Cobb, Albert W.
- Architectural style: Colonial Revival; Shingle Style
- NRHP reference No.: 83004284
- Added to NRHP: March 31, 1983

The Ames Schoolhouse is an historic school building at 450 Washington Street in Dedham, Massachusetts. It was originally part of the Dedham Public Schools. It currently serves as the town hall and senior center for the Town of Dedham.

== Description ==
The Colonial Revival structure was built in 1897. It was named in honor of American Revolution-era politician Fisher Ames. It is a large H-shaped building, with a central section flanked by symmetrical projecting bays on either side. It has a hip roof with a deep dentillated eave, and pilastered corners. The main entrance is set under broad arch at the center, with a Palladian window above. Above the front door is the following inscription:

1644 AMES SCHOOL 1897
Named in honor of Fisher Ames. A native of Dedham,
a wise statesman. And a friend of Washington. "With a
united government well administered, we have nothing to
fear and without it nothing to hope."

The building was dedicated in June 1898. On the first floor, in addition to the master's room and teachers' room, were eight classrooms. Each classroom was 28' by 36' and was designed for 56 students. At the southern end of the second floor were four classrooms, the library, and a chemical lab. The northern end housed the main hall with a stage and two dressing rooms.

In 1937, it was painted and renovated by the Works Progress Administration. The building was listed on the National Register of Historic Places in 1983 and sold in the same year. It was an office building for the next three decades.

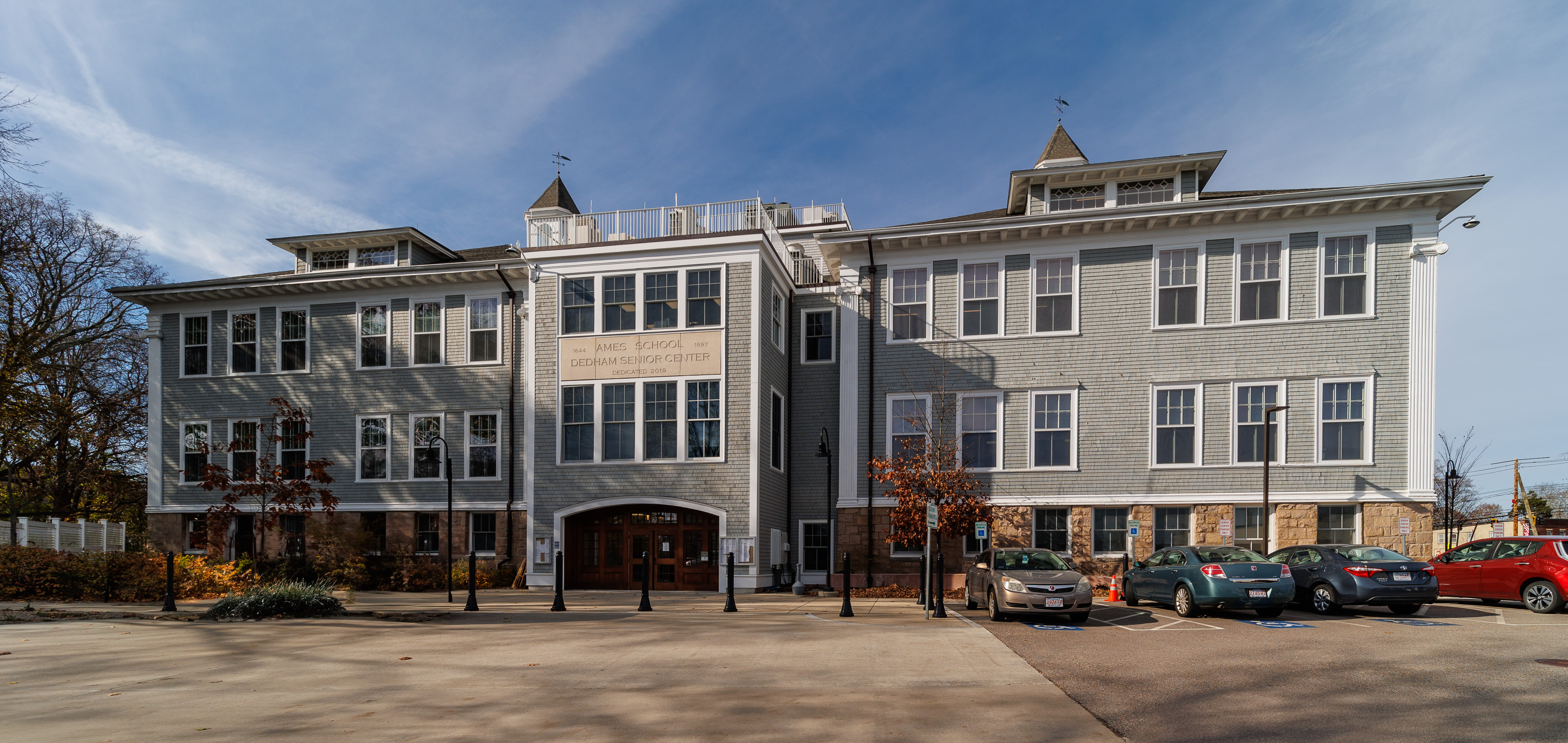
Southeast facade, facing Providence Highway.

At the 2014 Spring Annual Town Meeting, the Town of Dedham voted to repurchase the building for $5.85 million and renovate it to be used as a Town Hall and Senior Center. (Note: The project manager was Atlantic Construction and Management, Inc. and the architect is Turowski2 Architecture, Inc. CTA Construction Co. Inc. was the contractor and Sherwood Consulting & Design, LLC. served as the civil engineer for the project. The landscape architect was Mila Landscape Architects, LLC, and the structural engineer was B+AC, LLC. RDK Engineers were the project's engineers.) The project was long overdue and over budget. On June 19 and 20, 2020, most departments moved from the old town hall into the Ames Schoolhouse. The annual town election was delayed in 2020 due to the COVID-19 pandemic, and so the Town Clerk's office remained at the old town hall until the end of June.

The senior center portion of the building includes an outdoor patio, arts and crafts room, fitness center, media room, lounge, and more.

== See also ==
- National Register of Historic Places listings in Norfolk County, Massachusetts

== Works cited ==
- Smith, Frank (1936). A History of Dedham, Massachusetts. Dedham, Massachusetts: The Transcript Press, Inc.
- Dedham Historical Society (2001). Images of America: Dedham. Arcadia Publishing. ISBN 978-0-7385-0944-0.
