= Fisher-Whiting House =

Historic home in Dedham, Massachusetts

Coordinates: 42°14′14″N 71°09′04″W

The Fisher-Whiting House is an historic home in Dedham, Massachusetts originally built around 1669 by Anthony Fisher, Jr. (Note: Son of Anthony Fisher.) Located at 218 Cedar Street, it is the second oldest house in Dedham after the Fairbanks House.

Originally the house was a single story and had an L-shaped floor plan. In 1761, Jonathan and Mary Fisher made the house square and added a second story. Today, the house is an example of colonial era architecture.

Anthony Fisher built the house on a 60-acre lot in the 1660s, though the exact date is not certain. (Note: The Dedham Times, while noting that researchers have offered different dates, puts the house at "around 1669." Parr has the house being built in 1664.) Anthony left it to his son, Josiah Fisher, after his death in 1670. Josiah bequeathed the home and 60 acres to his grandson, Jonathon, in 1736.

Jonathan sold the house in 1765 to Dr. John Sprague who did not live there but used it as a rental property. Sprague sold the house in 1791 to Joseph Whiting, who deeded it to Edward Whiting in 1804. Edward deeded it to Edwin Whiting, his nephew, in 1844. The house and land were sold to a property developer in 1872. Sally Dresser Church purchased the home, which was in disrepair, in 1872 and planned to demolish it. She was persuaded to renovate the home instead.

When the Town of Dedham celebrated their 375th anniversary in 2011, the house was included in the celebrations. Students from Dedham High School drew an outline of the house for inclusion in a coloring book of historic places around town.

== Gallery ==
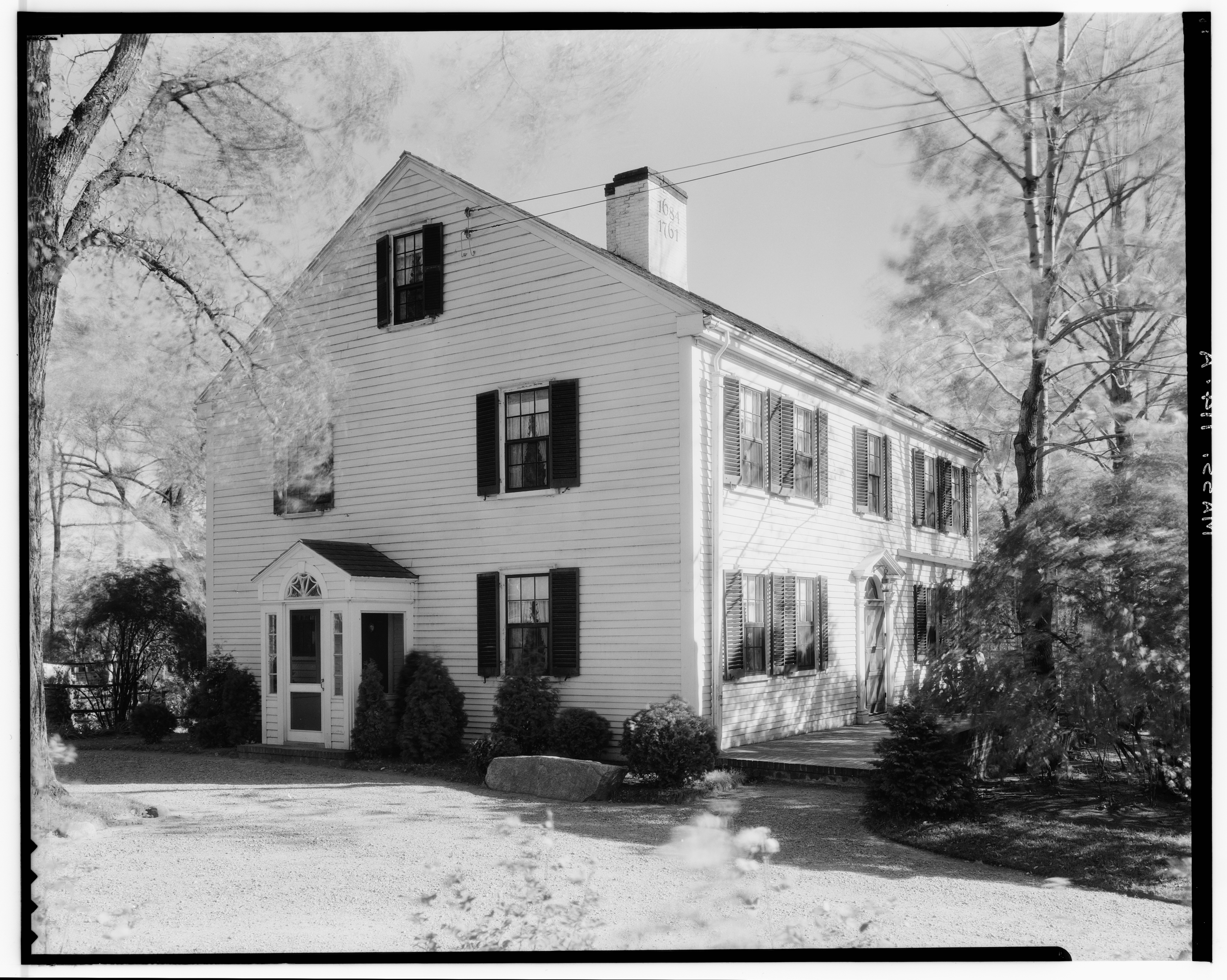
General view from north. - Fisher-Whiting House, 1933

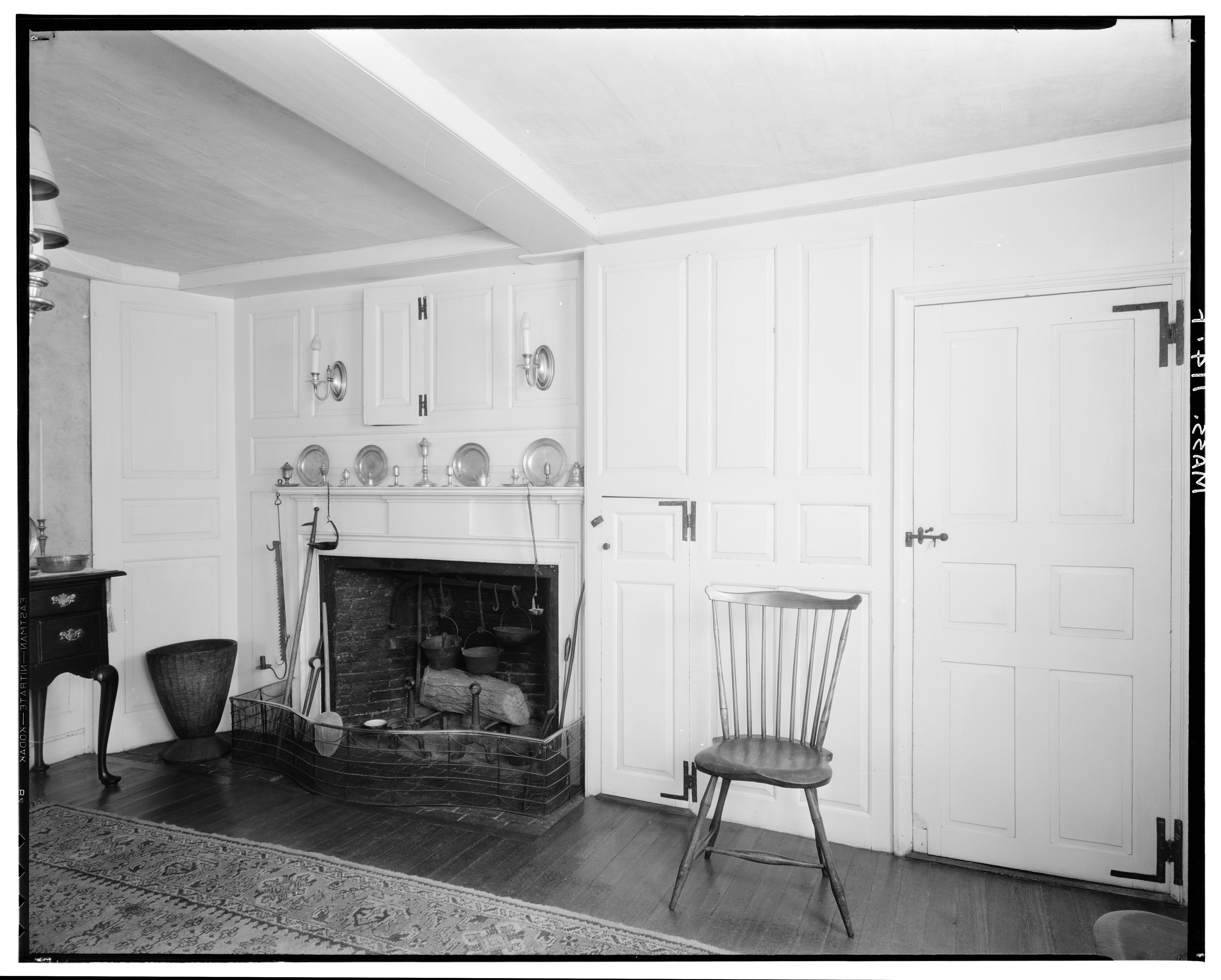
Fireplace wall in first-floor Dining Room. - Fisher-Whiting House, 1933

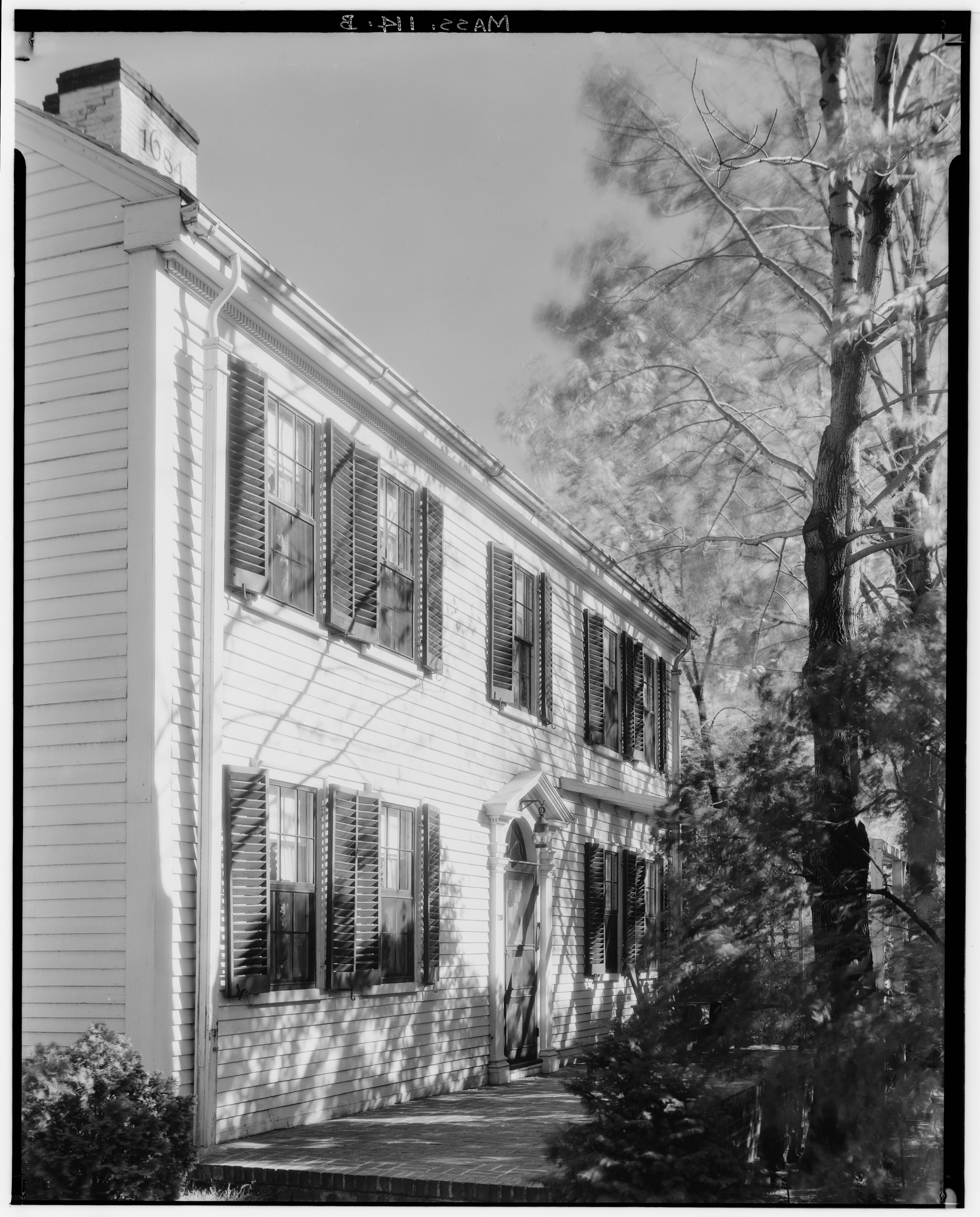
Detail of front, from North. - Fisher-Whiting House, 1933

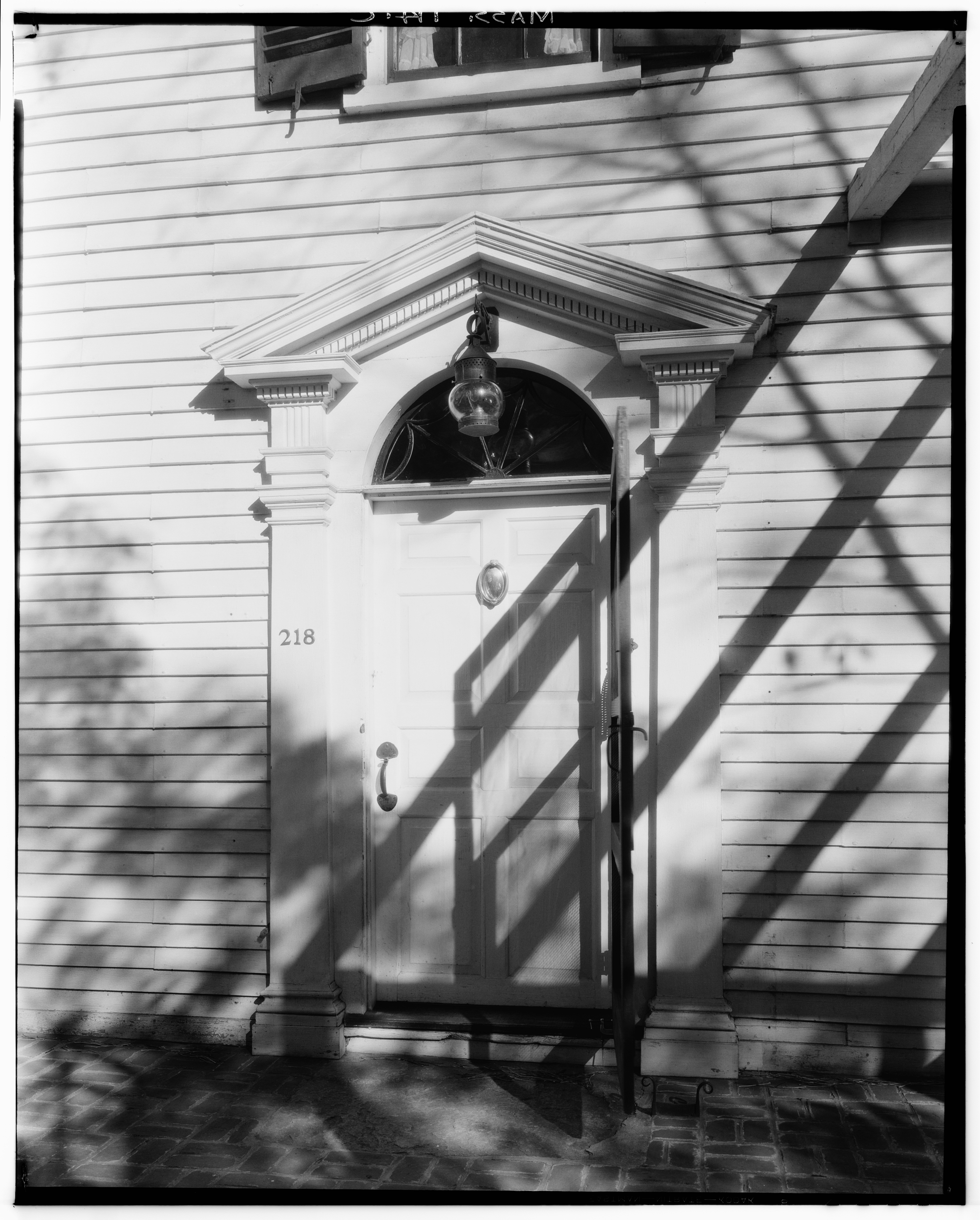
Detail of Front (N.W.) Entrance, - Fisher-Whiting House, 1933

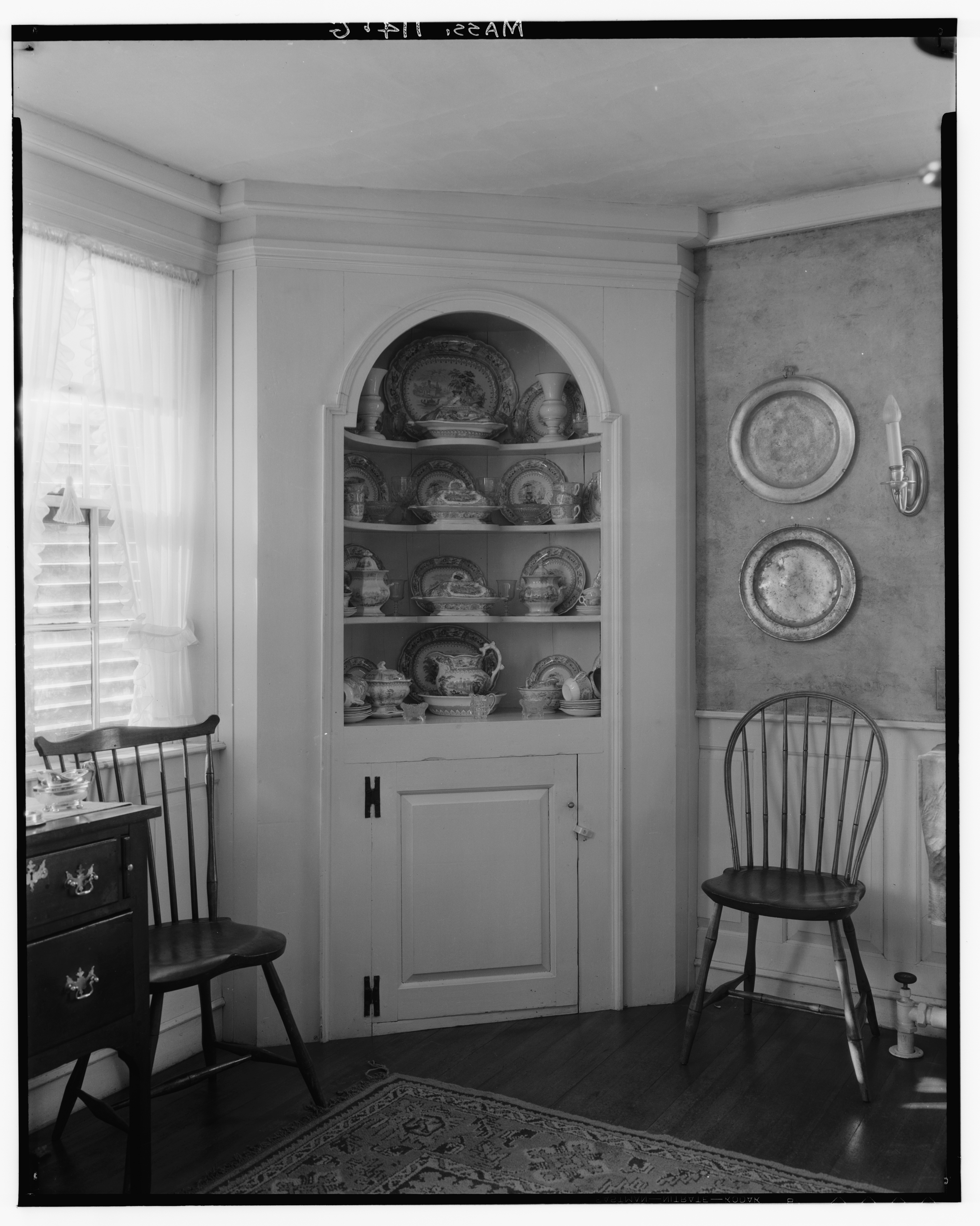
Corner Cupboard, North Corner, Dining Room. - Fisher-Whiting House, 1933

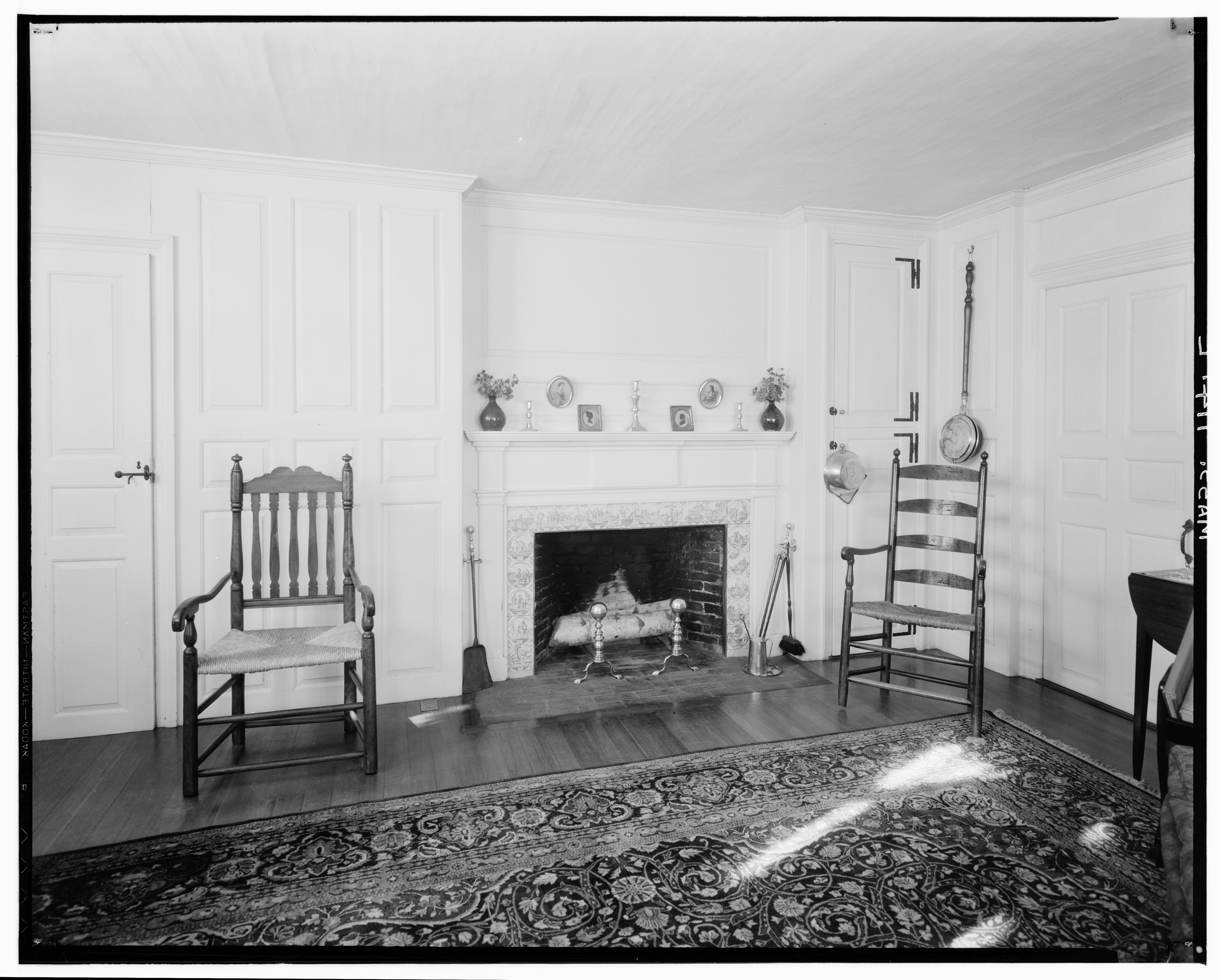
Paneled end of Parlor, 1st floor, N.W. Room (1761) - Fisher-Whiting House,1933

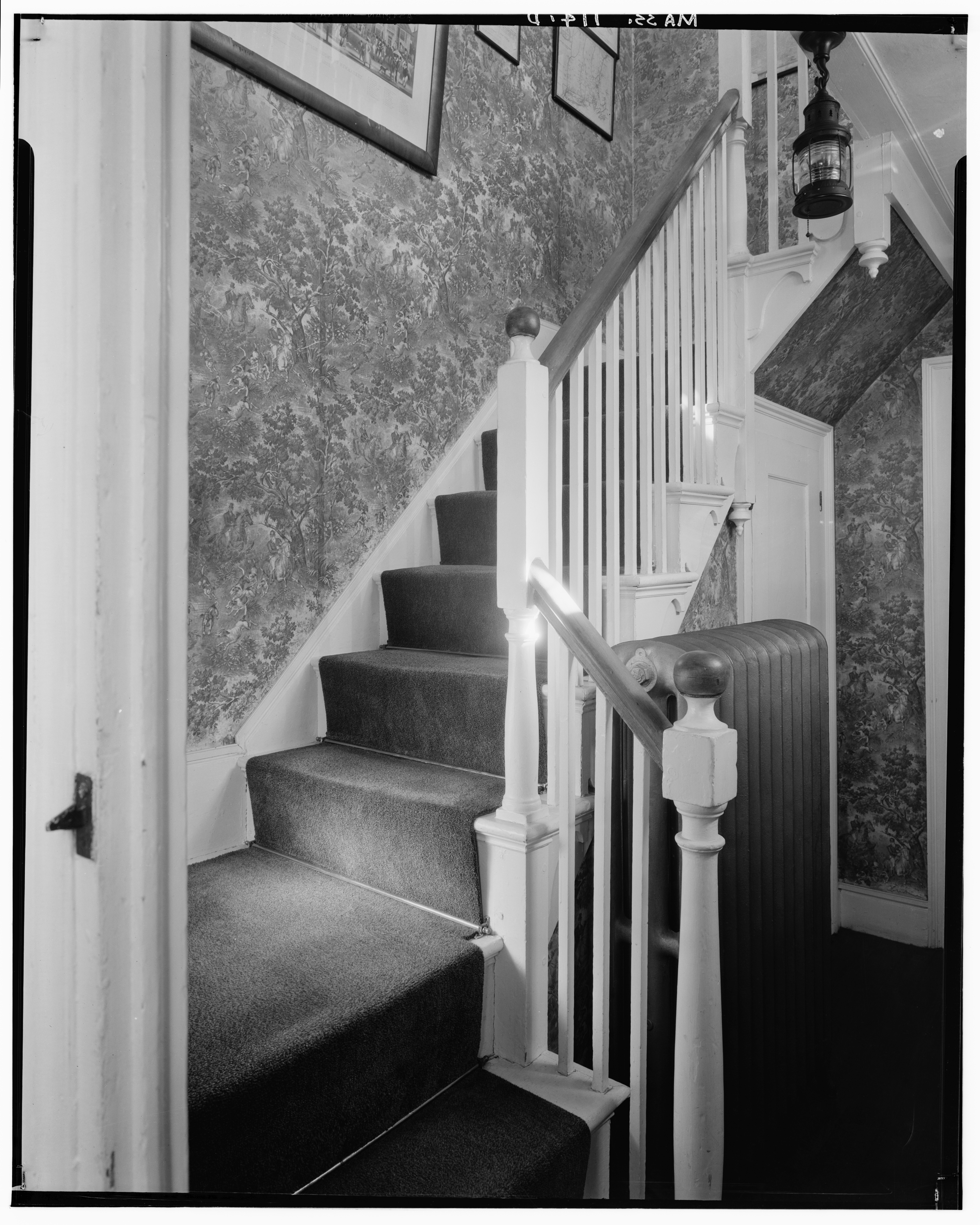
Entrance Hall and Front Staircase. - Fisher-Whiting House, 1933
