= Commodore (United States) =

U.S. naval rank from 1794 to 1985

- Rank flag (pennant style) of a Commodore during World War II

- World War II–era USN commodore insignia; since the early 1980s, worn by USN Rear Admiral (lower half)
- Country: United States of America
- Service branch: United States Navy; United States Coast Guard; United States Public Health Service Commissioned Corps; NOAA Commissioned Officer Corps
- Rank: One-star
- NATO rank code: OF-6
- Pay grade: O-7
- Formation: 1794
- Abolished: 1985
- Next higher rank: Rear admiral
- Next lower rank: Captain
- Equivalent ranks: Rear admiral (lower half); Brigadier general

Commodore was an early title and later a rank in the United States Navy, United States Coast Guard and also has been a rank in the United States Public Health Service Commissioned Corps and the National Oceanic and Atmospheric Administration Commissioned Officer Corps (NOAA Corps) and its ancestor organizations. For over two centuries, the designation has been given varying levels of authority and formality.

Since 1985, it is no longer a specific rank within active-duty or reserve forces or in the Public Health Service Commissioned Corps or NOAA Corps, but it remains in use as an honorary title within the U.S. Navy and U.S. Coast Guard for those senior captains (pay grade O-6) in command of operational organizations composed of multiple independent subordinate naval units, e.g., multiple independent ships, submarines, or aviation squadrons.

However, "commodore" is a rank that is actively used in the United States Coast Guard Auxiliary, the civilian volunteer branch of the Coast Guard, for the ranks of District Commodore, Vice National Commodore, and National Commodore.

== History ==
=== Early days ===
19th-century commodore insignia

Use of the term "commodore" dates from 1775 in the then–Continental Navy, the predecessor of the modern U.S. Navy, when it was established (but not used) as a courtesy title reserved for captains in command of a fleet or squadron.

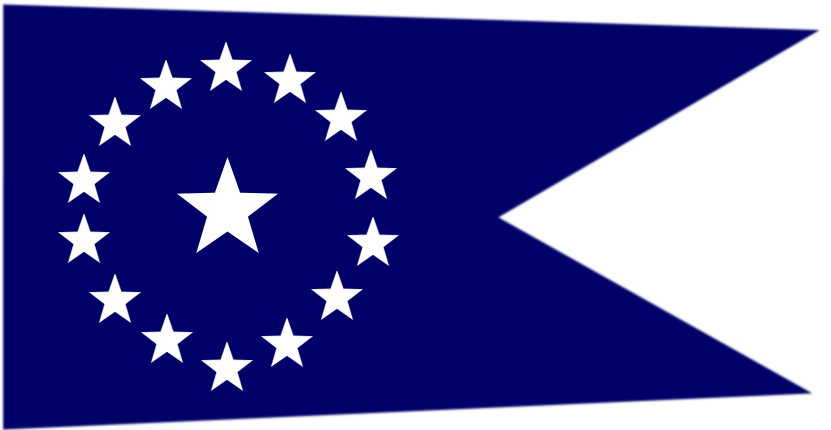
Broad Pennant of a US Commodore 1812

The first U.S. naval officer to become a commodore was John Barry, a senior officer of the Navy, appointed in 1794 after the former Continental Navy was reorganized into what would become the current U.S. Navy.

Because the U.S. Congress was originally unwilling to authorize more than four officer ranks in the navy (captain, master commandant, lieutenant, and midshipman) until 1862, considerable importance was attached to the title of commodore. Captain Isaac Hull, chafing at not being able to progress further in rank, wrote in 1814 that, if no admirals were to be authorized, something should be done to prevent, "...every midshipman that has command of a gunboat on a separate station taking upon himself the name of Commodore".

Like its Royal Navy counterpart at the time, the U.S. Navy commodore was not a higher rank, but a temporary assignment for navy officers, as Herman Melville wrote in his 1850 novel, White-Jacket.

An American commodore in the early period, like an English commodore or a French chef d'escadre, was an officer (generally, but not exclusively, a captain) assigned temporary command of more than one ship. He continued his permanent or regular rank during the assignment. Once employed as a commodore, however, many jealously held onto the impressive title after their qualifying assignment ended. The Navy Department tried to discourage such continuing usage because it led to confusion and unnecessary rivalries.

Eventually the title of commodore was defined more strictly, and was reserved for captains so designated by the Navy Department, although the practice of retaining the title for life added some confusion.

=== Rank of flag officer ===
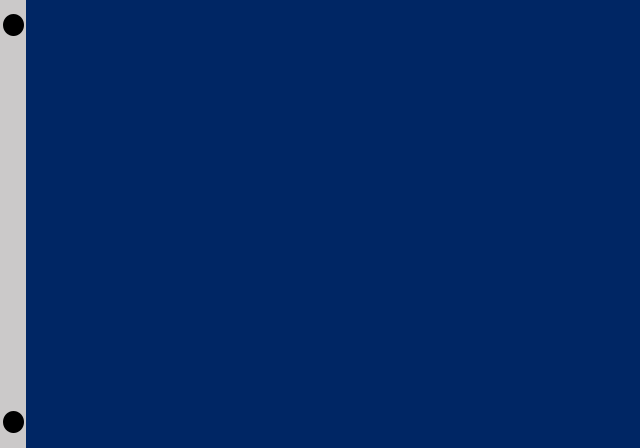
Flag of a Navy Senior Flag Officer (later Commodore) 1857-1865

In 1857, Congress established the grade of flag officer. This generic title was intended "to promote the efficiency of the Navy", but differed little from the previous practice. The first flag officer appointed was Charles Stewart, who was appointed as "Senior Flag Officer" in 1857. The Act to Further Promote the Efficiency of the Navy, passed on December 21, 1861, gave the president the authority to appoint squadron commanders with the "rank and title" of flag officer. On January 3, 1862 Charles H. Bell, William W. McKean, Louis Goldsborough and Samuel Dupont were promoted to Flag Officer, followed by David Farragut on January 17, 1862.

The rank of flag officer was short lived because it was replaced by commodore in July 1862.

=== American Civil War ===
Commodore of the Union Navy, 1864–1865 variant.

Flag of a US Commodore 1865

Because of the acute need for officers at the beginning of the American Civil War, naval tradition was ignored and commodore became for the first time a permanent commissioned rank in the U.S. Navy. Eighteen commodores were authorized on July 16, 1862. The rank title also lost its "line command" status when, in 1863, the chiefs of the bureaus of Medicine and Surgery, Provisions and Clothing, Steam Engineering, and Construction and Repair were all given the rank of commodore.

=== Disestablishment ===
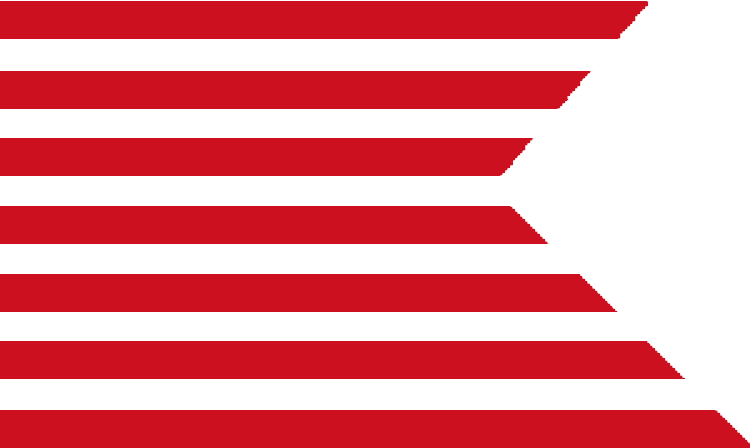
Short lived Broad Pennant of a US Navy Commodore 1870-

The rank of commodore continued in the Navy until March 3, 1899, when "An Act To reorganize and increase the efficiency and the personnel of the Navy and Marine Corps" redefined the list of officers on the active list and did not include the rank of commodore, effectively disestablishing the rank for active line officer, but not on the retirement list.

According to Laws Relating to the Navy, 1919, the step was taken, "…on account of international relationships, the consideration of which caused the Navy Department to regard the complications confronting it as inimical to the honor and dignity of this nation, because of the adverse effect upon its high ranking representatives in their association with foreign officers". In short, U.S. Navy commodores were not being treated as flag officers by other navies, or given the respect that the Navy Department thought was their due.

Commodore's Broad Pennant 1876 Navy Regulations

As it would have been expensive to increase the pay of all the former commodores to the level of rear admirals, the U.S. Congress at the time specified that the junior rear admirals which were referred to as rear admirals in the "lower half" of seniority, would have pay equal to brigadier generals of the U.S. Army. If there were an odd number of total rear admirals, the lower half of rear admirals was to be the larger. All rear admirals, regardless whether they are in the lower half or the upper half of seniority, were considered equal to major generals, and flew a blue flag with two-stars, and were entitled to a 13-gun salute. The U.S. Supreme Court later held that the rank of commodore had been removed from the U.S. Navy, leaving it without an actual rank equivalent to brigadier general. This act disgruntled all the brigadier generals, who could now be outranked by officers who were their juniors in terms of service. This was a point of inter-service controversy for many years, especially after 1916, when the U.S. Army made its brigadier generals equivalent to the rear admirals in the lower half of seniority. This made the rear admirals in the upper half of seniority, the only ones to be equal to that of a major general.

=== World War II and the Cold War ===
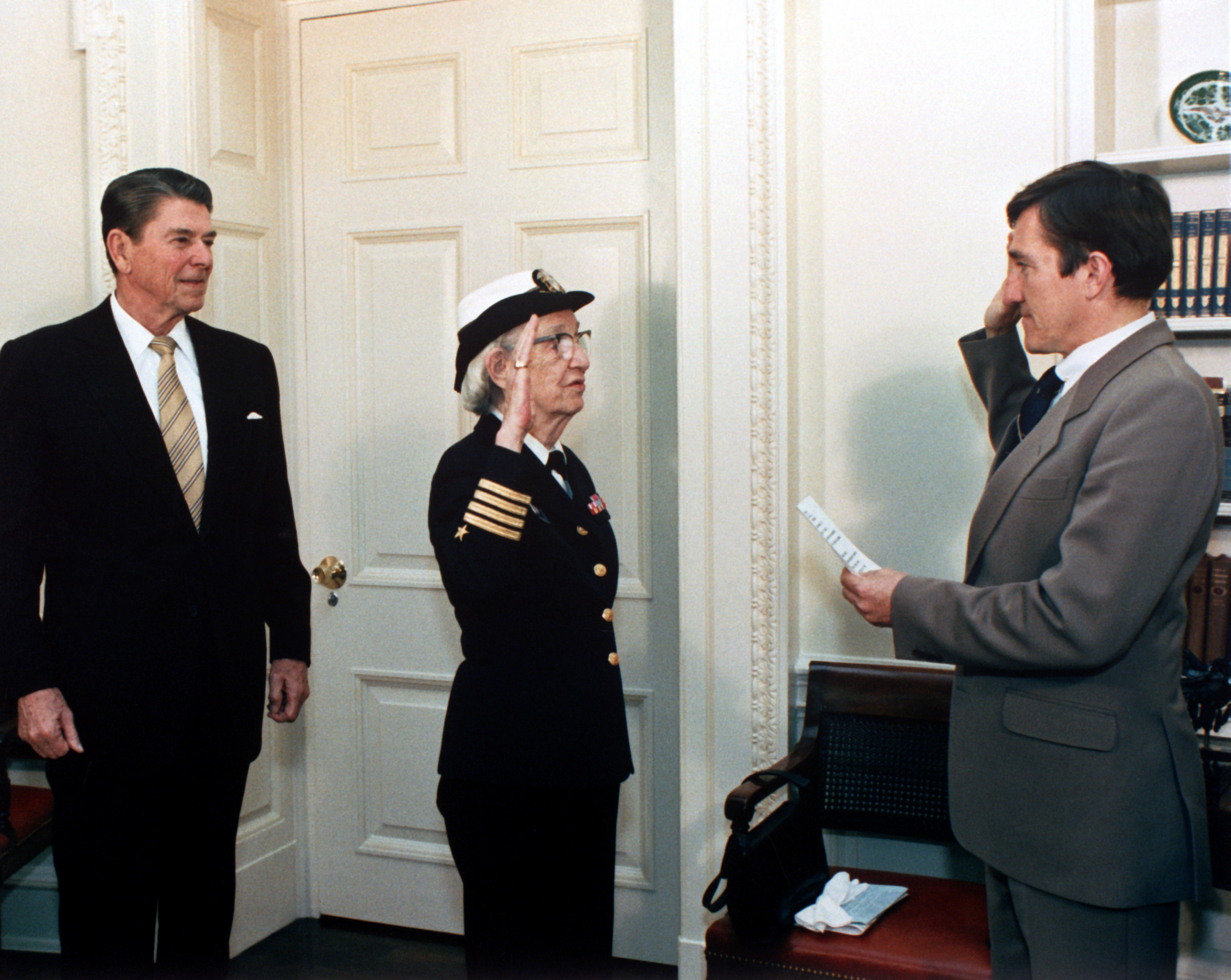
Grace Hopper being promoted to the rank of commodore in 1983

During the huge expansion of the U.S. Navy during World War II, the Department of the Navy was concerned that the appointment of more flag officers would create a glut of admirals whenever peacetime was achieved. However, some Navy and Coast Guard captains, although not yet selected for rear admiral, were holding commands of significantly higher responsibility than they had earlier and this needed to be recognized. The COMINCH of the U.S. Navy and Chief of Naval Operations, Admiral (later Fleet Admiral) Ernest J. King, proposed bringing back the older rank of "commodore" for these officers. President Franklin D. Roosevelt agreed, making the suggestion that the title be revived.

As a result, the one-star officer rank for the U.S. Navy and the U.S. Coast Guard was re-established in April 1943 with the title of "commodore". In actual practice, some officers on admiral's staffs were also promoted to the rank of commodore. By the end of the War in the Pacific in August 1945, there were over 100 commodores in the U.S. Navy and U.S. Coast Guard. With respect to the U.S. Coast Guard, it should be understood that during World War II, the much-expanded Coast Guard was transferred from the Department of the Treasury to the Department of the Navy and was involved in combat operations in both anti-submarine warfare and amphibious warfare, thousands of miles away from home, and not just in its usual role of defending the coasts of the United States, detaining smugglers, lifesaving, and search and rescue operations.

After World War II, and with the rapid drawdown in size of both the Navy and the Coast Guard, very few of the wartime commodores were ever promoted to rear admiral. All promotions to commodore ceased in 1947, and nearly all of the commodores who had held the one-star rank had either been promoted to rear admiral or had retired from the Navy by 1950. According to the 1949 edition of the Official Register of Commissioned Officers of the United States Navy, updated to January 1, 1949, the last two commodores on active duty were Tully Shelley (b. 1892) and Antoine O. Rabideau (b. 1884). Shelley retired in July 1949 and was promoted on retirement to rear admiral retroactive to April 3, 1945. Rabideau apparently died July 19, 1970, and his headstone shows him to have held the rank of rear admiral. However, as the Cold War evolved, the Navy began to rebound from its immediate post–World War II reductions. This expanding Navy saw growth in several mission areas, and the reintroduction and designation of senior captains in command of units comprising multiple ships (e.g., "flotillas"), multiple aviation squadrons (e.g., "air groups") or other similar organizations became increasingly commonplace, leading to increased use of the title of commodore for those senior captains occupying these highly responsible positions.

=== 1982 commodore admiral/1983 rear admiral (lower half) ===
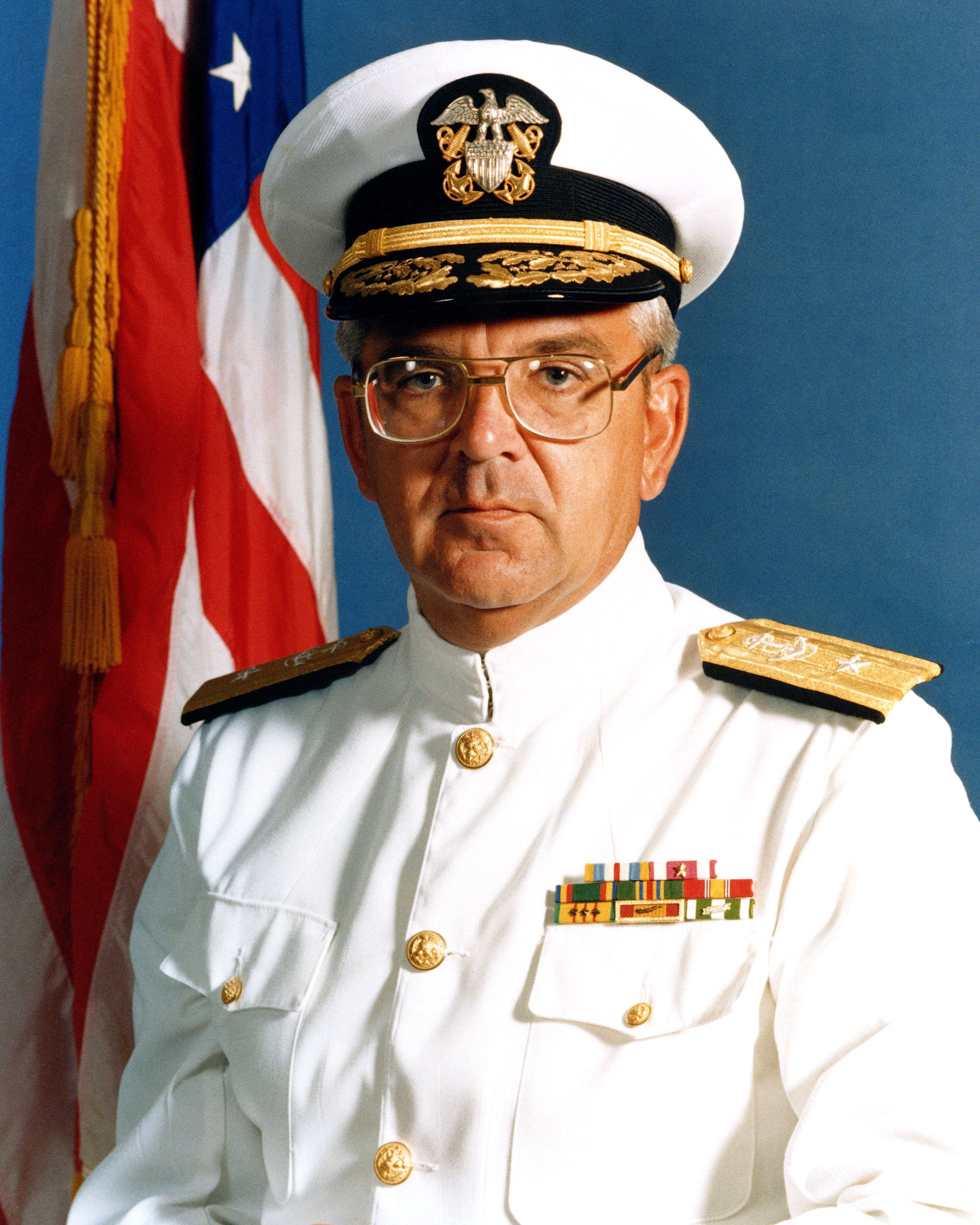
Commodore Charles F. Clark (US Navy) in 1984, with one-star insignia.

In the late 1970s and early 1980s, following years of objections and complaints by the U.S. Army, U.S. Air Force, and U.S. Marine Corps, efforts were begun to reinstate commodore as an official rank in the U.S. Navy and U.S. Coast Guard with a pay grade of O-7, replacing "rear admiral (lower half)", which were Navy and Coast Guard flag officers who were paid at the one-star rank of an O-7 and carried the relative seniority of a one-star officer, but who, due to the elimination of the rank of commodore at the end of World War II, wore the same two-star rank insignia as a full, or "upper half," rear admiral, an O-8.

In 1982, the rank of commodore was finally and officially reintroduced in the U.S. Navy and the U.S. Coast Guard as the O-7 rank. The one-star officer's rank and insignia for Navy and Coast Guard officers was thence re-established with the initial title of commodore admiral.

Later in 1982, following numerous objections by USN officers to the Chief of Naval Operations and USCG officers to the Commandant of the Coast Guard that this new title was unwieldy and confusing, the rank of "commodore admiral" was simplified to "commodore".

However, this action still failed to stem the confusion and the objections of senior officers in the naval services. This was because the U.S. Navy had long assigned the title (although not the rank) of commodore to selected captains holding major operational sea-going commands. Since at least the late 1940s, "commodore" had been used as a "position title" for senior navy captains who commanded air groups and air wings (other than those officers commanding carrier air groups/carrier air wings, who were historically known and referred to as "CAGs"), destroyer squadrons, submarine squadrons, amphibious squadrons, patrol boat flotillas, patrol hydrofoil missile ship squadrons, special warfare groups, construction regiments, and other large seagoing commands. The U.S. Coast Guard had never previously used the title.

In 1983, the one-star U.S. Navy and U.S. Coast Guard admiral rank was changed back to its original O-7 pay grade title of "rear admiral" with the discriminator in seniority and protocol purposes of "Rear Admiral (lower half)," and a rank title abbreviation of RDML versus the O-8 rank title abbreviation of RADM. The rank of commodore / commodore admiral was officially abolished in 1985.

From then on, commodore has remained a title for U.S. Navy captains in command of more than a single unit (other than captains commanding carrier air wings, who retained their traditional title of "CAG") and all U.S. Navy and U.S. Coast Guard one-star admirals were subsequently referred to as rear admiral. U.S. Navy and U.S. Coast Guard rear admirals (lower half) continued to wear the single star for collar insignia and applicable shoulder insignia (i.e., flight suits, jackets, etc.), a single silver star on top of solid gold background shoulder board insignia, and a single broad gold sleeve stripe insignia for dress blue uniforms (service dress blue, full dress blue and dinner dress blue) of all USN and USCG flag officers in pay grade O-7, and for the service dress white and full dress white uniforms of female USN flag officers in pay grade O-7.

The term "commodore" again reverted, and continues to this day, to that of an honorary title versus an actual rank for the limited number of captains in command of multiple units.

== Present-day title usage ==
=== Military ===
==== U.S. Navy ====
The U.S. Navy no longer maintains a rank of commodore, but the term has survived as an honorary title. Modern-day commodores are senior captains in the U.S. Navy. In Naval Aviation, they hold major operational command of functional or "type" air wings or air groups (exclusive of carrier air wings) such as strike fighter wings, electronic attack wings, patrol and reconnaissance wings, airborne early warning wings, strategic communications wings, various helicopter wings, training air wings, or tactical air control groups; in the Surface Warfare community, they lead surface squadrons, destroyer squadrons, littoral combat ship squadrons, amphibious squadrons, mine countermeasures squadrons, and naval beach groups; in the Submarine Warfare community they lead submarine squadrons and the unmanned undersea vehicle group; in the Special Warfare / Special Operations community they lead special warfare (SEAL) groups; in the Expeditionary Combat Force communities they lead maritime expeditionary security groups (MESGs), explosive ordnance disposal (EOD) groups, and naval construction regiments and groups (Seabees) within the Civil Engineer Corps.

With the exception of the naval construction regiments and groups that are commanded by senior captains of the U.S. Navy's Civil Engineer Corps, all other commodores are senior captains who are warfare-qualified unrestricted line (URL) officers in that combat specialty (e.g., naval aviators and naval flight officers commanding "functional" or "type" air wings or air groups, surface warfare officers commanding destroyer squadrons, etc.).

In contrast to the U.S. Air Force (USAF), the U.S. Navy does not use USAF's same wing/group/squadron structure where "groups" are subordinate to "wings." Within the USN component of Naval Aviation, a "group" is considered equal to a wing if commanded by an O-6, and senior to a wing if commanded by an O-7 or O-8 (e.g., carrier strike group, patrol & reconnaissance group). This same model applies to surface warfare officers commanding destroyer or littoral combat ship squadrons, submarine warfare officers commanding submarine squadrons, SEAL officers commanding special warfare groups, etc.). These O-6 commanded units will typically report to a higher command echelon "group" led by a USN Flag Officer.

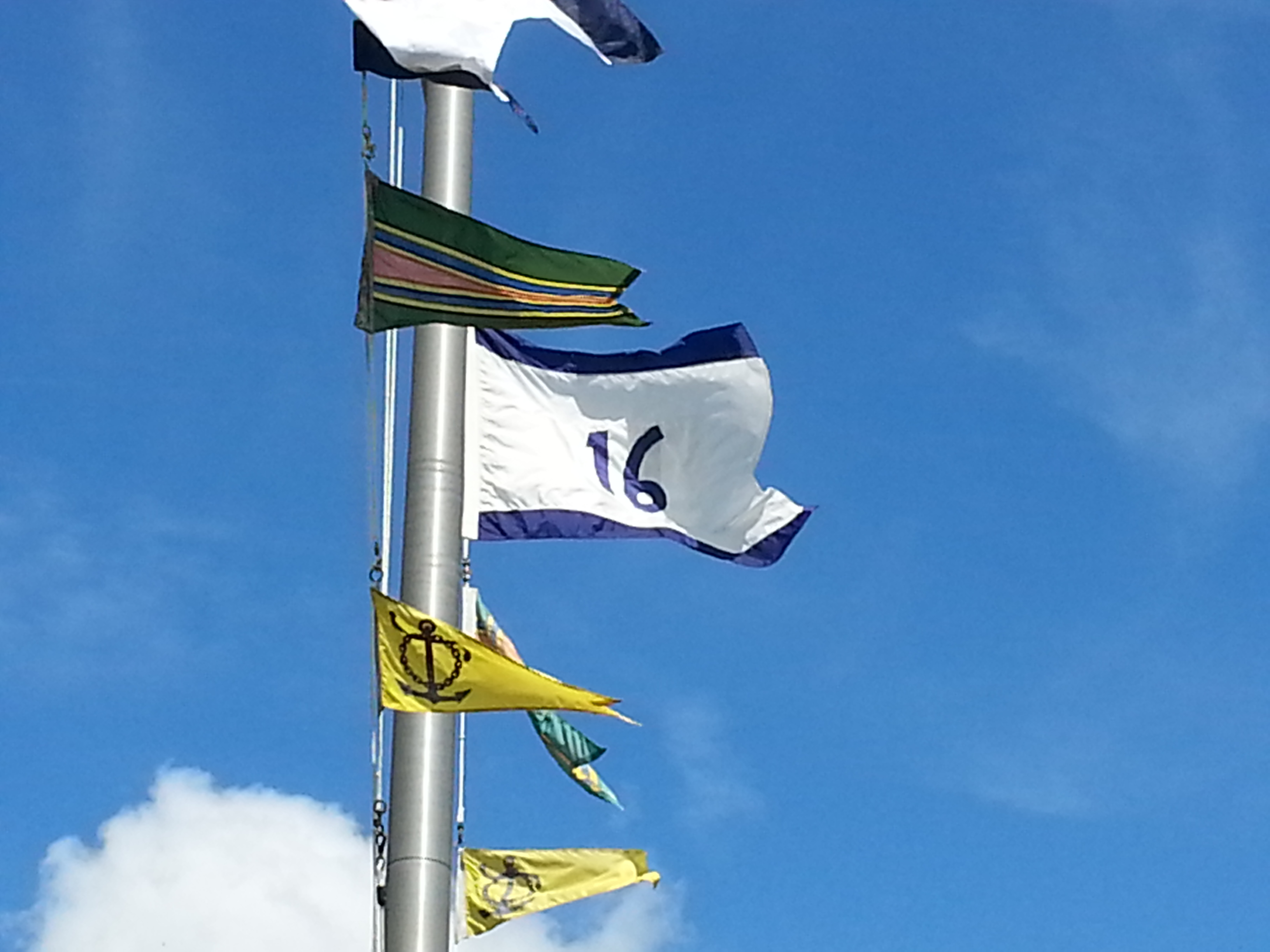
The command pennant of the Commander, Submarine Squadron 16 (COMSUBRON 16) above the squadron's headquarters at Naval Submarine Base Kings Bay, Georgia.

Captains assigned to a commodore billet employ the term "commander" in their organizational command title, this in keeping with the naval tradition of officers commanding a single ship, unit or installation being referred to as a "commanding officer" or "CO", while those captains and flag officers commanding multiple ships, multiple aviation squadrons, multiple air wings, task forces, fleets, etc., being known as a "commander" (but not to be confused with the USN / USCG rank of commander). Captains in this latter category are referred to, both orally and in correspondence, as "commodore", but continue to wear the rank insignia of a captain.

Captains in command of carrier air wings continue to use the traditional title of "CAG" which dates from when these units were known as carrier air groups.

While technically not flag officers, captains holding a commodore billet are authorized a blue and white broad pennant, also known as a "command pennant", which is normally flown from their headquarters facilities ashore and/or from ships on which they are embarked when they are the senior officer present afloat (SOPA). Depending on the type of aircraft, it may also be displayed as a plate or decal when embarked on that aircraft, or painted on one of the aircraft in one of their subordinate squadrons that also displays their name on the fuselage. This swallow-tailed pennant has a white field bounded by two horizontal blue stripes, with the numerical designation or the initials of the command title in blue centered on the white field.

In the U.S. Navy, commodore billets are considered to be O-6 "major command" assignments for Captains, on par with the commanding officers of major combatant vessels (e.g., aircraft carrier, battleship, guided missile cruiser, amphibious assault ship), commanders of carrier air wings, and commanding officers of major shore installations (e.g., naval air station, naval station, naval base, naval support activity, etc.). In the other U.S. armed services, the level and scope of responsibility of a USN Captain in a commodore billet is equivalent to that of the Commanding Officer of a Marine Regiment, Marine Aircraft Group (MAG) or Marine Expeditionary Unit (MEU) in the U.S. Marine Corps; a wing commander in the U.S. Air Force (even when the USN command is designated as a "Group"); a delta commander in the U.S. Space Force, or a brigade commander, special forces group commander, or O-6 level post commander/installation commander in the U.S. Army.

==== U.S. Coast Guard ====
The U.S. Coast Guard presently designates the USCG captain commanding those U.S. Coast Guard cutters and other afloat and ashore USCG units comprising Patrol Forces Southwest Asia (PATFORSWA) as a "commodore". PATFORSWA is headquartered at Naval Support Activity Bahrain in Manama, Bahrain and its primary area of responsibility is the Arabian Gulf / Persian Gulf, as well as other areas coinciding with that of the Commander, United States Naval Forces Central Command (COMUSNAVCENT) / United States Fifth Fleet (COMFIFTHFLT). It is currently the only commodore billet in the U.S. Coast Guard and this usage mirrors the USN's use of the title "commodore".

=== Auxiliary components of uniformed services ===
==== U.S. Coast Guard Auxiliary ====
In the U.S. Coast Guard Auxiliary variants of "commodore" are used as position titles for high level leadership positions (e.g. National Commodore, Deputy National Commodore, District Commodore etc.). While Coast Guard Auxiliarists do not hold military ranks per se, it is not usual to address an auxiliarist by position title. These very senior members of the USCG Auxiliary do use "Commodore" (abbreviated "COMO") as a form of address (e.g. Commodore John Smith; or COMO John Smith).

The National Commodore wears insignia similar to that of a Coast Guard vice admiral (three stars), the Vice National Commodore and the four Deputy National Commodores wear insignia similar to that of a rear admiral upper half (two stars), and the eight Assistant National Commodores and each District Commodore wear insignia similar to that of a rear admiral lower half (one star). There also several Deputy Assistant National Commodores but these members wear insignia similar to that of a Coast Guard captain and are not addressed as "Commodore."

The Coast Guard Auxiliary also occasionally bestows the title of "Honorary Commodore" as a mark of high esteem. Recipients of this honor include actor and Coast Guard veteran Lloyd Bridges (who was an active member of the Auxiliary and served as its national celebrity spokesman in the 1970s) and television personality Al Roker (who produced the documentary series Coast Guard Alaska).

==== U.S. Maritime Service ====
The United States Maritime Service uses the rank of commodore for their one-star flag officers, with the two-star rank being simply designated as "rear admiral". The rank is usually given to the president of one of the seven federal and state maritime academies who had not attained flag rank during his/her active duty naval career.

== Civilian use ==
=== Commodore in Yachting Leadership ===
Civilian yacht clubs, yachting associations and fellowships with formal hierarchical structures, began to use the title "commodore" in countries around the world for their presidents in the early twentieth century along with "vice commodore" in the same manner as "vice president,"and "rear-commodore" and "port captain' or "international bridge member" in the same manner as board members.

Commodores, Vice-Commodores and Rear-Commodores are also known as civilian Flag officers because they have an Epaulettes, Regalia and Maritime flags with designated symbols and number of stars for their ranks. Many of the clubs that are more than a century old, such as the Los Angeles Yacht Club have formal ceremonies, where Commodores from more than 100 surrounding yacht clubs and flag officers of the U.S. Navy and U.S Coast Guard attend a ceremony at the beginning of the year. The ceremony includes a bagpipe entrance, a presentation of the country flag by commissioned officers of the country's navy, and a cannon shot upon the raising of each individual officer's flags on a flag staff (also known as Flagpoles) for each flag officer (Commodore, Vice Commodore, Rear Commodore) as their term of office officially begins. Sometimes a trumpet fanfare is also include for special occasions like ribbon cutting in 2019 for the 50th Transpacific Yacht Race. Salutes are given to Commodores for special ceremonies, including Opening Days of the Racing Season.

== Popular use ==
=== Commodore as mascot or nickname ===
The athletic teams of Vanderbilt University of the Southeastern Conference use "Commodore" as their mascot, the nickname of the university's founder and namesake Cornelius Vanderbilt.

Gulf Coast State College in Panama City, Florida, also uses the Commodore mascot for its sports teams.

Bayside High School (Queens) located in the Bayside neighborhood of the New York City borough of Queens also uses the Commodore as its mascot.

=== Commodore as a title of recognition by State of Rhode Island ===
The state of Rhode Island has a group of select individuals, appointed by the governor, known as Rhode Island Commodores. Rhode Island Commodores function as ambassadors for the state and promote its economy and attractions. It is similar to the title Kentucky Colonel, but less commonly awarded.

== See also ==
- Air commodore
- Commodore (rank)
- Commodore-in-Chief
- Commodore admiral
- Rear admiral (lower half)
- Fleet captain
- Senior captain
