= Elizabeth Clay =

Elizabeth Clay may refer to:

- Liz Clay (born 1995), Australian 100m hurdler
- Elizabeth Campbell Fisher Clay (1871–1959), American artist and painter

== See also ==
- Elisabeth Clay (born 2000), American submission wrestler and Brazilian jiu-jitsu practitioner
