= Leon A. Edney =

American admiral (born 1935)

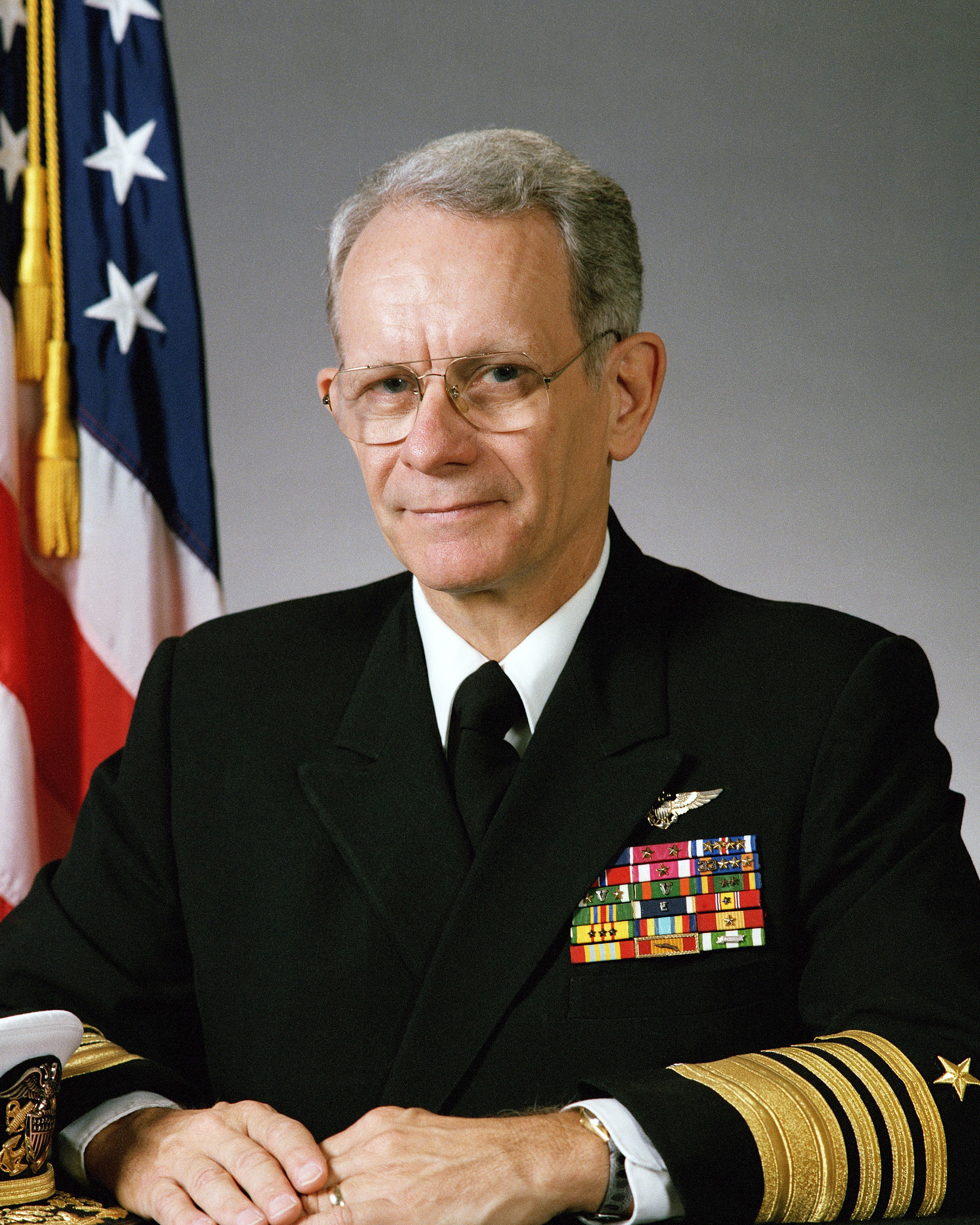
- Edney in 1988
- Born: March 1, 1935 (age 91); Dedham, Massachusetts, US
- Military career
- Allegiance: United States
- Branch: United States Navy
- Service years: 1957–1992
- Rank: Admiral
- Commands: Supreme Allied Commander Atlantic; United States Atlantic Command; Vice Chief of Naval Operations; Carrier Group 1 USS Constellation (CV-64); USS Ponchatoula (AO-148); Carrier Air Wing Two; Attack Squadron 27
- Conflicts: Vietnam War
- Awards: Defense Distinguished Service Medal (2); Navy Distinguished Service Medal (2); Legion of Merit (3); Distinguished Flying Cross (5); Bronze Star Medal

Leon Albert "Bud" Edney (born March 1, 1935) is a former United States Navy officer. A native of Dedham, Massachusetts, he retired from the navy as an admiral after serving as Vice Chief of Naval Operations from 1988 to 1990.

== Naval career ==
Designated a naval aviator in 1958, Edney's first operational flying tours were with Air Antisubmarine Squadrons 27 and 24. Following his graduate studies at Harvard, he served a two-year tour in Washington, D.C., as a special assistant to the deputy chief of naval operations for research and development. In 1965, Edney transitioned to light attack jet aircraft and was assigned to Attack Squadron 164. In 1970, he was assigned to the staff of the chief of naval operations as the Western Hemisphere plans officer in the Political-Military Plans Division. He was selected as a White House Fellow in 1970 and served as a special assistant to the secretary of transportation. In 1971, Edney was named executive officer of Attack Squadron 27 and assumed command of the squadron the following year.

Edney assumed command of Carrier Air Wing Two, embarked in the aircraft carrier USS Ranger (CV-61) in 1974. He then became the commanding officer of the fleet oiler USS Ponchatoula (AO-148) two years later. He then served as chief of staff for commander, Cruiser Destroyer Group Five before assuming command of the aircraft carrier USS Constellation (CV-64) in January 1980. Under his command, Constellation participated in RIMPAC '80 exercise with navies from the Pacific basin before deploying to the Western Pacific in April 1980. During this deployment, Constellation remained on station in the Indian Ocean for 110 straight days in support of U.S. foreign policy. In June 1981, Edney was designated a commodore admiral and became the sixty-ninth Commandant of Midshipmen at the United States Naval Academy. In March 1984, he became Commander, Carrier Group 1 and made another deployment to the Western Pacific embarked in Constellation the following year.

Following his assignment as commander, Carrier Group 1, Edney served as the assistant deputy chief of naval operations for air warfare; director, Aviation Plans and Requirements Division; and later director, Office of Program Appraisal for the secretary of the navy. In 1987, he became the chief of naval personnel, and the deputy chief of naval operations for manpower, personnel, and training. He was promoted to admiral and assumed duties as the vice chief of naval operations in August 1988, and as such was directly responsible to the chief of naval operations for the command of the navy's operating forces and the administration of its shore establishment.

In May 1990, Edney assumed duties as NATO's Supreme Allied Commander Atlantic, and commander in chief, United States Atlantic Command. He retired on 1 August 1992.

Edney's personal awards and decorations include the Defense Distinguished Service Medal, the Navy Distinguished Service Medal with gold star, the Legion of Merit with two gold stars, Distinguished Flying Cross with four gold stars, Bronze Star Medal, Meritorious Service Medal with gold star, Air Medal with gold numeral 8 and bronze numeral 30 Navy Commendation Medal with Combat V, and the Republic of Vietnam Gallantry Cross with gold star, as well as various campaign and unit awards. During his career he has accumulated more than 5,600 flight hours, flown 340 combat sorties, and made more than 1,000 carrier landings.

Edney is married to the former Margon Beck of Hastings, Nebraska. They have two daughters, Merrie and Jaimie.

== Civilian activities ==
Edney retired in August 1992 and was appointed as an éminence grise for the Center for Naval Analyses and the National Defense University. In April 1997 Charles R. Larson selected Edney to fill the post of Distinguished Professor of Leadership at the United States Naval Academy. In this position, Edney was charged with "teaching core leadership and ethics courses and promoting moral development and leadership education" to academy students.

In addition to his duties as a Capstone Senior Fellow, Edney serves as a senior fellow at the Center for Naval Analyses, and is director of the Armed Forces Benefit Services, Inc. and the Retired Officers Association. He has also in recent years been awarded government contracts to perform education services for the National Defense University.

In 1986 Edney was presented with the Outstanding Alumni Award from Dedham High School. Edney serves on the board of advisors for the Jewish Institute for National Security Affairs.

Edney was named Veteran of the day on July 30, 2021 by the Veteran's Administration.

== Awards and decorations ==
Edney's decorations and medals include:

| Badge | Naval Aviator Badge | | | |
| 1st Row | Defense Distinguished Service Medal with one bronze oak leaf cluster | Navy Distinguished Service Medal with one gold award star | | Legion of Merit with two award stars |
| 2nd Row | Distinguished Flying Cross with four award stars | Bronze Star | Meritorious Service Medal with award star | Air Medal with three award stars and bronze Strike/flight numerals 33 |
| 3rd Row | Navy and Marine Corps Commendation Medal with two award stars and Valor device | Navy and Marine Corps Achievement Medal with Valor device | Navy Unit Commendation with two bronze service stars | Navy Meritorious Unit Commendation |
| 4th Row | Navy "E" Ribbon | National Defense Service Medal with service star | Vietnam Service Medal with three service stars | Navy Sea Service Deployment Ribbon |
| 5th Row | Vietnam Gallantry Cross with gold star | Vietnam Armed Forces Honor Medal, 2nd class | Vietnam Gallantry Cross Unit Citation | Vietnam Campaign Medal |
| Badge | Office of the Joint Chiefs of Staff Identification Badge | | | |

== Notes ==
Military offices
| Preceded by Huntington Hardisty | Vice Chief of Naval Operations; 1988–1990 | Succeeded by Jerome L. Johnson |
