= Jerome L. Johnson =

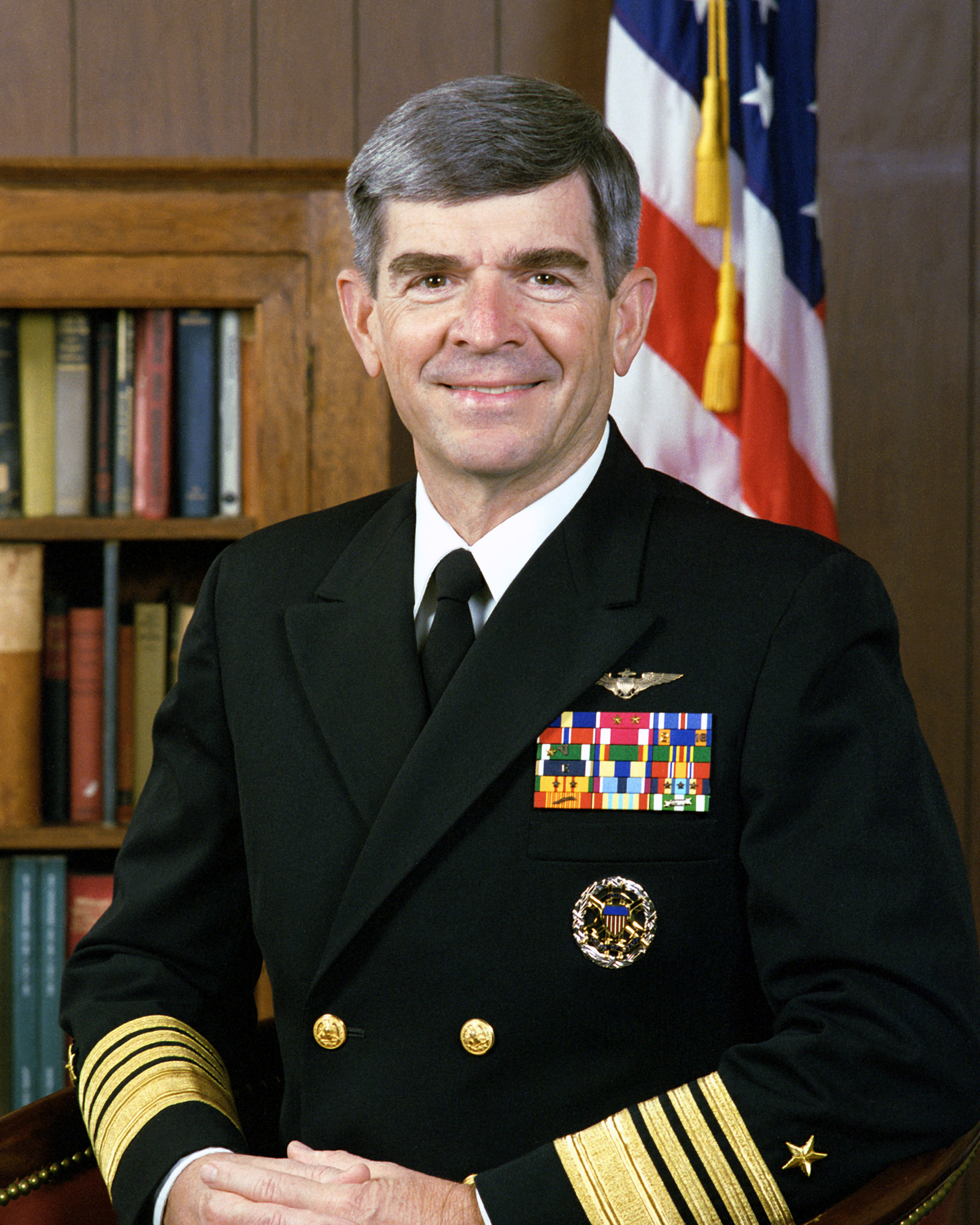
- Admiral Jerome L. Johnson
- Born: September 21, 1935 (age 91)
- Military career
- Allegiance: United States
- Branch: United States Navy
- Service years: 1956–1992
- Rank: Admiral
- Nickname: Jerry
- Commands: Vice Chief of Naval Operations; United States Second Fleet; Carrier Group 4 USS Coral Sea; USS San Jose; VFA-27
- Conflicts: Vietnam War
- Awards: Navy Distinguished Service Medal; Legion of Merit (3); Distinguished Flying Cross; Bronze Star Medal

Jerome LaMarr Johnson (born September 21, 1935) is a retired four-star admiral of the United States Navy who commanded the United States Second Fleet, Joint Task Force 120, and NATO's Striking Fleet Atlantic from 1988 to 1990. He served as Vice Chief of Naval Operations from 1990 to 1992.

Johnson has endorsed the false conspiracy theory that the 2020 presidential election was rigged to favor Joe Biden and claims that the United States "has taken a hard left turn toward Socialism and a Marxist form of tyrannical government."

== Early life and career ==
A Texas native, Johnson graduated from Texas A&M University in 1956; he would become the third A&M graduate to reach 4-star rank. He then entered the Naval Aviation Cadet Program and was commissioned and designated a Naval Aviator. He served on active duty for almost 38 years. His commands at sea included Attack Squadron Twenty-Seven (VA-27), the combat stores ship USS San Jose, the aircraft carrier USS Coral Sea, Carrier Group 4, the United States Second Fleet, and NATO's Striking Fleet Atlantic.

Johnson is a graduate of the Naval Postgraduate School in Monterey, California, and the National Intelligence University in Washington, D.C. The latter later awarded him an honorary doctorate.

His final assignment was as the Vice Chief of Naval Operations. Before his retirement from active service, he became the navy's "Gray Eagle," the longest-serving Naval Aviator on active duty.

== Awards and decorations ==

Naval Aviator insignia
Navy Distinguished Service Medal	Legion of Merit with two gold award stars	Distinguished Flying Cross
Bronze Star Medal	Meritorious Service Medal	Air Medal with gold award numeral 2 and bronze strike/flight numeral 18
Navy and Marine Corps Commendation Medal with Combat V and gold award star	Navy Unit Commendation	Navy Meritorious Unit Commendation
Battle Effectiveness Award 4th awards	Navy Expeditionary Medal	National Defense Service Medal
Vietnam Service Medal with two service stars	Humanitarian Service Medal	Sea Service Deployment Ribbon with three bronze service stars
Vietnam Gallantry Cross with palm	South Vietnam Armed Forces Honor Medal 1st class	Vietnam Campaign Medal
Joint Chiefs of Staff Identification Badge

== Post-military career ==
After his military career, Johnson served for a decade as the President and Chief Executive Officer of the Navy-Marine Corps Relief Society. Founded in 1904, the non-profit provides financial, educational, and other assistance to active-duty and retired sailors, Marines, and their eligible family members. During his tenure, the Society disbursed more than $670 million in interest-free loans, grants, and tuition assistance for naval service families. Johnson stepped down in June 2003.

From 2002 to 2004, he served as Chairman of the Board of the 385,000-member Military Officers Association of America (MOAA).

Johnson serves as Chairman of the Board of Directors for Smiths Detection Inc., and Smiths Interconnect Inc; Vice President and Board of Directors for Wärtsilä Defense Inc; Trustee for the National Museum of Naval Aviation at Naval Air Station Pensacola, Florida; and the Board of Advisors for the Jewish Institute for National Security Affairs.

== Personal life ==
Johnson was married to Joy Johnson for 59 years until her death in 2014. They have three adult children. Johnson and his second wife, Marsha, reside in Fort Myers, Florida.

== See also ==
- Gray Eagle Award

== Notes ==
Military offices
Preceded by Leon A. Edney	Vice Chief of Naval Operations; 1990–1992	Succeeded by Stan Arthur
