= Josiah Fisher =

American politician

Josiah Fisher (born c. 1654 (Note: He was 16 years old when his father died in 1670.)-1736) represented Dedham, Massachusetts, in the Great and General Court. He served as selectman for five terms beginning in 1697.

Fisher was 16 years old when his father, Anthony, died and left him the family estate. He was the grandson of Anthony Fisher. Upon his death in 1736, he left his home, known today as the Fisher-Whiting House, to his grandson, Jonathan.

== Works cited ==
- Worthington, Erastus (1827). The History of Dedham: From the Beginning of Its Settlement, in September 1635, to May 1827. Dutton and Wentworth. p. 1.
