= George F. Close =

United States Army general

- Born: George Francis Close, Jr. November 28, 1946 (age 79); Dedham, Massachusetts
- Education: Pepperdine University
- Spouse: Marcia McCann Evans
- Children: 2
- Military career
- Allegiance: United States
- Branch: United States Army
- Service years: 1966–2000
- Rank: Major General
- Conflicts: Vietnam War; Operation Uphold Democracy

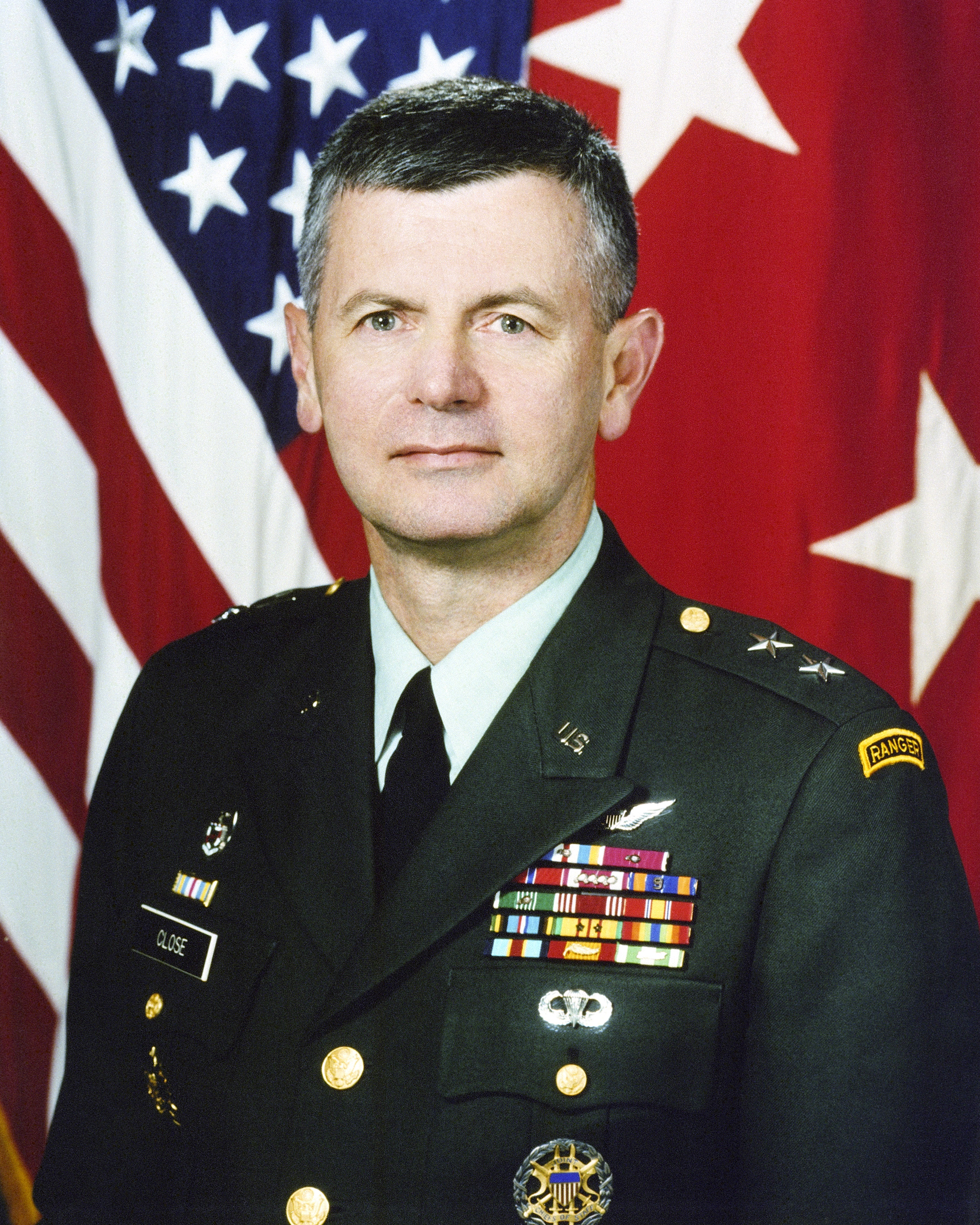
Official portrait, July 1997

George Francis Close Jr. (born 27 November 1946) is a retired United States Army major general who began his service as a private in 1966 and was commissioned through Officer Candidate School in 1967. His career included combat service in Vietnam, infantry command, and senior assignments in Haiti, at United States Southern Command in Panama, and on the Joint Staff at the Pentagon. He served concurrently as SOUTHCOM’s director of operations and director of Joint Interagency Task Force South, and completed his active-duty career as the Joint Staff’s director for operational plans and interoperability.

Following his military service, Close held senior corporate leadership roles in the United States and the Middle East, including oversight of logistics and security services supporting U.S. operations in Iraq and Afghanistan.

== Early life and education ==
Close grew up in an Irish Catholic family in Dedham, Massachusetts, the eldest of five children of George Francis Close Sr., an automobile mechanic, and Rosaleen Close, née Maguire. His mother immigrated from Enniskillen, Northern Ireland, to Brooklyn, New York, in 1928.

His father served 42 months in the United States Army Air Forces during World War II, including service in England with the Eighth Air Force, known as the “Mighty Eighth.” His maternal uncle, Staff Sergeant Patrick F. Maguire, was a B-17 ball-turret gunner with the 305th Bomber Group. He was killed in action over Germany on September 9, 1944, and is buried at Lorraine American Cemetery in Saint-Avold, France. His brother, Paul Michael Close, served with the United States Marine Corps in Vietnam and received the Purple Heart after being wounded in action.

Close graduated from Dedham High School in 1964, where he played baseball, football and varsity basketball. He helped the basketball team reach the 1964 Tech Tournament at the old Boston Garden, its first appearance in 17 years, since 1947. Dedham defeated Charlestown 59–36 before losing to Braintree in the second round. He later earned a Bachelor of Science in business management from Pepperdine University.

== Military career ==
Close was drafted into the United States Army and began service on January 27, 1966, as a private (Pvt.), at the age of 19. He completed basic combat training (BCT) at Fort Ord, California, followed by advanced individual training (AIT) at Fort Carson, Colorado. He then attended Officer Candidate School at Fort Benning, Georgia, graduating with Class 8-67 and receiving his commission on Mar 27, 1967. He graduated from Ranger School in 1967 and earned the Ranger Tab. He served as an instructor at the Mountain Ranger Camp in Dahlonega, Georgia, from 1967 to 1968, teaching the mountain phase of Ranger School. Following that assignment, he attended flight school at Fort Wolters, Texas, before deploying to Vietnam.

Close served in Vietnam from 1968 to 1969, flying UH-1 Huey helicopters while stationed at Sóc Trăng in the Mekong Delta of South Vietnam. His assignments included commanding the 2nd Platoon of the 121st Aviation Company, serving as an assistant operations officer in the 13th Aviation Battalion, and serving as operations officer of the 121st Aviation Company.

After returning from Vietnam, Close attended Pepperdine University in Los Angeles under the GI Bill, earning a Bachelor of Science in Business Management.

In Germany, Close served with the 3rd Infantry Division. His assignments included command of Headquarters and Headquarters Company, 1st Brigade; aide-de-camp to the division’s commanding general; and command of the division’s Headquarters and Headquarters Company.

Close subsequently joined the 9th Infantry Division at Fort Lewis, Washington. There he served successively as executive officer of the 3rd Battalion, 47th Infantry; operations officer (S-3) of the 3rd Brigade; deputy operations officer (G-3) of the division; and executive officer of the 2nd Brigade serving.

As a lieutenant colonel, Close commanded an infantry battalion in the 25th Infantry Division (Light) at Schofield Barracks, Hawaii: the 1st Battalion, 5th Infantry, later the 3rd Battalion, 21st Infantry. Hw commanded the battalion during Exercise Team Spirit in South Korea in 1985. After battalion command, Close served on the Army’s personnel staff in Washington, D.C., and, as a lieutenant colonel, as senior aide-de-camp to the Secretary of the Army, John Marsh.

As a colonel, Close commanded an infantry (airborne) brigade in the 6th Infantry Division (Light) at Fort Richardson, Alaska. The division’s “Arctic Light” mission combined rapid-deployment readiness with the defense of Alaska. Close then became chief of the Operational Requirements Division in the Joint Staff’s J-7 directorate, working with the Joint Requirements Oversight Council.

In 1994, Secretary of the Army Togo D. West Jr. participated in Close’s promotion ceremony to brigadier general. Close served as senior military assistant to the secretary before joining the 10th Mountain Division at Fort Drum, New York, as an assistant division commander, a position he held from 1994 to 1995.

In September 1994, the United States launched Operation Uphold Democracy, a United Nations-authorized intervention to restore Haiti’s elected president, Jean-Bertrand Aristide, who had been overthrown in a 1991 military coup. During the operation, Close served as deputy commander of Joint Task Force 190 and commanded Task Force Mountain. He coordinated the planning, deployment and operations of a 22,000-person joint task force, helping establish the conditions for the elected government’s return. Aristide returned to Haiti on October 15, 1994.

From 1995 to 1997, Close served concurrently as Director of Operations (J-3) at United States Southern Command and director of Joint Interagency Task Force South in Panama. In these roles, he oversaw the training and operations of U.S. air, land, and sea forces in Latin America and the Caribbean and coordinated interagency drug interdiction efforts throughout the 33 countries in the region.

From 1997 to 2000, Close served as director for operational plans and interoperability, J-7, on the Joint Staff, reporting to the chairman of the Joint Chiefs of Staff. His responsibilities included war plans, joint doctrine, exercises and training, lessons learned, and professional military education. He also served as the chairman of the Joint Chiefs of Staff’s executive agent for implementing Joint Vision 2020.

== Post-military career ==
Following his retirement from the Army in 2000, Close held executive positions in technology, logistics and security companies. His early roles included vice president positions at Reynolds and Reynolds. He later joined DynCorp International, where he oversaw operations in Afghanistan and Iraq and held senior leadership positions in law enforcement, security and Middle East operations. His work included managing logistics, construction and base-support services for U.S. forces in southern Afghanistan.

Close subsequently served as president and chief executive officer of International Development Solutions, president of Hayat Logistics Services, and chief executive officer of Olive Group North America. These roles involved security services for the U.S. government and efforts to support State Department operations in Iraq. In 2016, he became president of The SPECTRUM Group, a consulting firm serving U.S. and international clients in defense, security and government-related fields.
