= Dedham High School =

- 140 Whiting Avenue; Dedham, Massachusetts 02026; United States

Information
- School type: Comprehensive public high school
- Established: May 12, 1851; 175 years ago
- Superintendent: Nan Murphy
- CEEB code: 220675
- NCES School ID: 250405000548
- Principal: James P. Forrest
- Teaching staff: 69.2
- Grades: 9–12
- Enrollment: 719 (2024–2025)
- Student to teacher ratio: 10.4
- Campus size: 11.3878 acres (4.6085 ha)
- Campus type: Suburban
- Colors: Maroon and gray
- Athletics conference: Tri-Valley League
- Mascot: The Marauders
- Rival: Norwood High School
- Accreditations: New England Association of Schools and Colleges
- Newspaper: The Dedham Mirror
- Feeder schools: Dedham Middle School
- Website: School website

Dedham High School is a public high school in Dedham, Massachusetts, United States, and a part of the Dedham Public Schools district. The school was founded in 1851 by the oldest public school system in the country. It earned a silver medal from U.S. News & World Report in 2017, ranked as the 48th-best high school in Massachusetts.

In the 2010s, the school saw growth in both the number of students taking Advanced Placement courses and in qualifying scores on the exams. It ranks in the top 10 of Massachusetts high schools with 26.6 percent of students taking at least one AP exam during the 2015–16 school year. The school's athletic program offers 26 varsity sports with a mascot known as the Marauder, and 26 co-curricular clubs and activities. Each student receives a personal computer from the school.

== History ==
=== 1800s ===
As early as 1827, the Commonwealth of Massachusetts required all towns with more than 500 families to establish a free public high school. Beginning in 1844 the School Committee repeatedly began recommending that the town establish a high school. It was not until 1850 when, under threat of a lawsuit, that the town meeting voted to "instruct the Town's School Committee to hire a building and teacher, and establish a High School according to law." A sum of $3,000 was appropriated to support it.

The new school was opened on September 15, 1851 with 42 students. Charles J. Capen, a private high school teacher, was hired to teach at the new school, and his classroom in the Masonic Hall above William Field's dry good store was rented by the town. (Note: Capen was musically talented and was the organist of the First Church and Parish in Dedham. He was also community minded and often volunteered around town. He had a son, Charles L., who later studied music in Germany. Capen lived on the south side High Street, two houses to the west of Eastern Avenue.) The building, located at 25 Church Street, was previously Miss Emily Hodge's Private School. The school used this space from 1851 to 1854, at which point it was moved to the Town House on Bullard Street. (Note: The store and school building was then converted into a private residence, which was occupied by Dr. Maynard.)

In 1894, the alumni association presented the school with a gift of 350 books as the nuculeus of the Slafter Reference Library, named in honor of principal Carlos Slafter. The books were chosen from a selection of American and English authors as well as many standard reference books. The school committee purchased a special oak book case for the collection and placed a silver plate upon it stating:

Slafter Reference Library
Dedham High School
Formed in grateful recognition of the service of
Carlos Slafter
Principal of the High School 1852–1892
Given by the Alumni Association November 27, 1894

=== 1900s ===
In 1958, the student council adopted a dress code at the school. By 1973, much of the code had been eliminated, including skirts for girls and neckties for boys, but there remained a ban on blue jeans; jeans of other colors were allowed. A student protest on February 15, 1973, which included a walkout of classes and became known as "Dungaree Day," led to a repeal of the ban.

The population of the school peaked in 1972 with more than 2,100 students in grades 9–12, but declined in the following years. The then-middle school (housed in the 1915 High School building), however, was at capacity, and so from 1996 until the new middle school opened in 2007, Dedham High School served grades 8–12.

=== Buildings ===
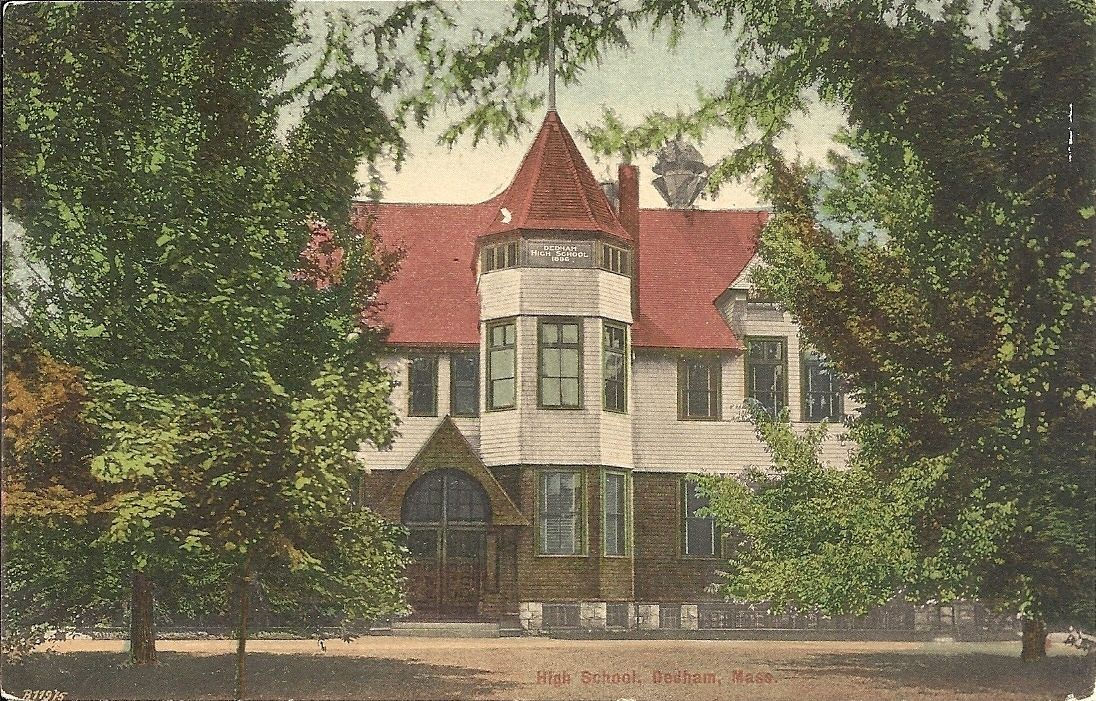
A postcard of the building that housed Dedham High School in Dedham, Massachusetts from 1886 to 1915 on Bryant Street

After moving from Masonic Hall, the classes were held at the Town House for one year until, in 1855, a new school was built on Highland Street and dedicated on December 10. A new school was built on Bryant Street in 1887, and students moved in on October 3. That building was 80' long and 77' wide. After 1915, when the high school moved to Whiting Avenue, the building housed the Ames Junior High School, and today it is the site of the Public Safety Building.

From 1916 to 1959 the high school was located at 70 Whiting Avenue. Governor Calvin Coolidge took part in the dedication ceremony on March 31, 1917. Students first occupied the school in the spring of 1916. It was three stories tall, plus a basement, and was built of water-struck brick and featured terra cotta trimming. It later served as the Dedham Middle School.

In 1932 a new wing was added at a cost of $200,000. It contained an auditorium dedicated to George Frederick Joyce, who was connected to the school for 25 years and principal for 21 of them, on May 12, 1933. Later, this wing was used as the Oakdale Junior High School.

Special laws were passed by the Massachusetts General Court in 1957 allowing the town to use Stone Park across the street to build a new high school. Classes began at 140 Whiting Avenue in 1959, and continue to the present. The building cost $2 million to construct, but even before the building opened town officials knew that it would be too small to house all of the students of the post-war baby boom.

An addition to this building was constructed in 1967, which consisted of a new academic wing with 28 new classrooms and an additional gymnasium. Plans also included the construction of a new athletic practice field and tennis courts along High Street. (Note: The Mucciaccio Pool would also be built in this location in 1975.) Land was taken by eminent domain for the expansion, including the mansion once owned by R.O. Storrs.

In 1976 a new library, a larger cafeteria, modern science laboratories, swimming pool, and more classrooms were added. The old cafeteria was converted into an auto body shop, and is currently the home of the town's Facilities Department.

The library was renovated and expanded in 1999, and the C-Wing of the school was renovated with state-of-the-art new science labs in 2002. The superintendent and other central administrators have offices in renovated classrooms in the B-wing, and the town's Youth Commission has offices in the A-wing.

=== Principals ===
There have been 18 principals of Dedham High School, a position currently held by James Forrest. The longest serving was Carlos Slafter, who served for 40 years, and who hired his own daughter as a teacher. Peter Smith served twice, from 1976 to 1987 and from 1997 to 2000.

| Years | Principal | Length of service |
|---|---|---|
| 1851-1852 | Charles Capen | 1 year |
| 1852-1892 | Carlos Slafter | 40 years |
| 1892-1913 | George Joyce | 21 years |
| 1913-1918 | William Sprague | 5 years |
| 1918-1919 | William Lee Jr. | 1 year |
| 1919-1953 | Ralph Eaton | 34 years |
| 1953-1955 | Harold Cowan | 2 years |
| 1955-1962 | Lawrence Brown | 7 years |
| 1962-1973 | Thomas O'Donnell | 11 years |
| 1973-1976 | John Benn | 3 years |
| 1976-1987 | Peter Smith | 11 years |
| 1987-1992 | Anthony Zonfrelli | 5 years |
| 1992-1997 | Denise Walsh | 5 years |
| 1997-2000 | Peter Smith | 3 years |
| 2000-2008 | Alan Winrow | 8 years |
| 2008-2011 | Jacob Santamaria Jr. | 3 years |
| 2011-2017 | Ron McCarthy | 6 years |
| 2017- | James Forrest | |

=== MCAS ===
Between 2006 and 2013, scores on the Massachusetts Comprehensive Assessment System improved 20%. In 2012, 91% of students scored proficient or higher on the English Language Arts portion. For the math and science portions, the numbers were 89% and 79%, respectively, both of which were at least 10% higher than the state as a whole. In the biology subject exam, Dedham High School has ranked as one of the best in the state, with three students earning perfect scores.

=== College courses ===
Students taking some honors or AP courses can dual-enroll for college credit at the nearby Massachusetts Bay Community College. The three credits can then be transferred to another state college or some private colleges, allowing students to place out of those classes in college. Courses eligible for dual enrollment include English 4, calculus, pre-calculus, world and U.S. history, psychology, biology, chemistry, anatomy and physiology, and environmental earth science.

=== Mass Math + Science Initiative ===
More than 260 sophomores, juniors, and seniors, which amounts to nearly half of those classes, are taking at least one Advanced Placement course. In 2009 the school joined the Mass Math + Science Initiative, a program sponsored by Mass Insight Education, and by 2012 the number of students who have scored a qualifying score on the exam had risen by 57%. By 2013, the number of qualifying scores had risen 68% to 141. During the 2015–16 school year, 26.6 percent of students took at least one AP exam.

=== Technology ===
The town of Dedham has made a substantial commitment to making sure every student has access to the latest educational technology. Beginning in 2011, each incoming freshman was provided with a new netbook computer to use in class and take home at night. While the computers remain the property of the school district, students are responsible for them. As the district has a policy of replacing computers every five years, and since one of the machines would be nearly depreciated by the time a student is graduated four years later, the district allows students to keep the computers after commencement.

The original plan was to provide each new freshman with a netbook until, four years later, the entire school would be outfitted with them. In the 2012–2013 school year freshmen were given netbooks, while sophomores received iPads. The schedule was accelerated beginning with the 2013–2014 school year, when freshmen received netbooks while all sophomores, juniors, and seniors received iPads. Eventually all students will be issued iPads.

Parents are asked to pay a $100 technology fee to help cover the cost of the equipment. However, for students who receive free or reduced price lunch, the fee is waived. The program may be extended in future years to include middle school students as well.

=== Dedham Storytellers ===
In 2017, the Dedham Storytellers initiative was founded as a collaboration between students in Michael Mederios' history class at Dedham High School, the Dedham Rotary Club, the Dedham Historical Society, the Dedham Council on Aging, and the Dedham High School Alumni Association. Students interviewed senior citizens who grew up in Dedham over a series of three lunches and a trip to the Historical Society. They then wrote three essays: an autobiography, a biography of the senior citizen they interviewed, and an essay about how their lives compare to those who grew up in town generations earlier. In 2025, the fifth collection of essays, which is stored at the Historical Society, was produced.

== Athletics ==
=== Sports ===
Dedham High School participates in the Tri-Valley League (TVL) of the Massachusetts Interscholastic Athletic Association. Dedham High School joined the TVL for the 2017–18 school year, leaving behind the Bay State Conference after 58 years of membership. They were previously invited to join in 2009, but declined the offer. Dedham's enrollment had shrunk to 719 during the 2015–16 school year, when the move was announced, nearly one-third the size of some larger schools in the Bay State Conference, such as Newton North, Framingham, and Weymouth.

- Fall
  - Cheerleading
  - Boys' cross country
  - Girls' cross country
  - Field hockey
  - Football
  - Golf
  - Boys' soccer
  - Girls' soccer
  - Volleyball
- Winter
  - Boys' basketball
  - Girls' basketball
  - Cheerleading
  - Boys' ice hockey
  - Girls' ice hockey
  - Boys' indoor track
  - Girls' indoor track
  - Swimming
  - Wrestling
- Spring
  - Baseball
  - Boys' lacrosse
  - Girls' lacrosse
  - Boys' outdoor track
  - Girls' outdoor track
  - Softball
  - Boys' tennis
  - Girls' tennis

=== Championships ===
Dedham has had some sports success such as a D3 Wrestling state title in 2018 and 2026. The girls field hockey won several Tri Valley League and Bay State League titles in the 2000s, and also a state championship in 2003. Dedham football also went undefeated in the regular season in 1988 with a 10–0 record.

In 2022, both the boys and girls varsity soccer teams played, but lost, in the state championships.

=== Thanksgiving Day football rivalry ===
Dedham High School began playing Norwood High School in an annual football contest in 1920. As of 2023, Dedham has won 42 games, Norwood has won 50, and there have been two ties.

Over the years, there have been several notable incidents. In 1946, thousands of fans swarmed the field for about 20 minutes after a Norwood touchdown pass was brought back on an offensive interference penalty. During the closing minutes of the game, the crowd threw stones and other objects at the officials. The Dedham Police Department had to escort them off the field after the game.

In 1956, seven boys from Norwood High School threw bottles of blue and white paint, the school colors, through the windows of Dedham's School Department administration building to celebrate their team's win the day before. While they admitted to the paint, they denied being involved with the smashing of 22 windows at Dedham High School on Thanksgiving Day.

Several days after the assassination of John F. Kennedy, the 5th annual torchlight procession and rally was canceled the night before the game, but Dedham beat Norwood at home, 30–0.

=== Mascot ===
As the town of Dedham is the seat of Norfolk County, the school's athletic teams informally used the name "Shiretowners" until 1968. In that year, students voted on a new name for the school's mascot. Senior Kenneth Martin proposed the Marauders, after Merrill's Marauders, which were immortalized in the 1962 film of the same name. The proposal beat two other finalists and an American Indian was chosen as the mascot. The name and the colors of crimson and gray were retained, but the logo changed to a pirate in 2007.

=== Stone Park ===
Most teams play at Veteran's Memorial Field at Stone Park, which was rededicated on Thanksgiving Day, 2011, following a major upgrade and renovation. A new track and field was installed on the site in 2023, beginning shortly after the June commencement ceremonies; it was completed in the fall. It is also used by the Pop Warner football program, the school band, and other students.

The land where the stadium and school stand was originally donated by Col. Eliphalet Stone. Stone deeded 49,897 sq. ft of land to the Dedham Improvement Society, an unincorporated organization, on June 2, 1884, to be used as a park.

On January 2, 1895, Town Meeting took the property, per Stone's instructions, and purchased an adjoining parcel for from Louise M. Morse for $8,750, bringing the entire parcel up to 6.25 acres. It was later expanded again to 8.49 acres. Town Meeting appropriated $2,500 on September 16, 1895, and the land was graded and developed with a cinder track of .2 miles and a dressing house. The original land donated by Stone became a playground of 250' by 425'. In 1957, the Great and General Court of Massachusetts passed laws allowing the town to use the land to build a new high school.

== Co-curricular activities ==
Dedham High School currently offers 26 co-curricular activities:

- Art Club
- Chamber Singers
- Chess Club
- Color Guard
- Computer Club
- Debate Team
- Drama Club
- ECHO - literary magazine
- Fashion Club
- French Club
- Global Citizens
- Jazz Band
- Link Crew
- Marching Band
- The Mirror - student newspaper
- National Honor Society
- Math Team
- Peer Leaders
- String Ensemble
- Students Against Destructive Decisions
- Science Team
- Sexuality and Gender Alliance
- Student Council
- Winter Percussion
- Women Empowerment Club
- Youth and Government

=== Senior class play ===
The senior class at Dedham High School has a long tradition of putting on a play, usually a musical, as one of their final efforts as a class. Tryouts are usually held in December, and the production is staged in mid-March. While the play has been held annually since at least the late 1960s, the tradition is much older than that. Connie Hines, a member of the class of 1948, tried out for a role in her senior class play but did not make the cut. After graduation she went on to Hollywood and starred in a number of television shows, including Mr. Ed.

- 1980s
  - 1980 - Fiddler on the Roof
  - 1981 - WhatareyagonnadonowJim?
  - 1982 - South Pacific
  - 1983 - Oklahoma
  - 1984 - The Wizard of Oz
  - 1985 - Guys and Dolls
  - 1986 - Grease
  - 1987 - Chicago
  - 1988 - Peter Pan
  - 1989 - Little Shop of Horrors
- 1990s
  - 1990 - Leader of the Pack
  - 1991 - Man of La Mancha
  - 1992 - Oliver!
  - 1993 - Starmites
  - 1994 - The Wiz
  - 1995 - Hello, Dolly!
  - 1996 - Bye Bye Birdie
  - 1997 - Damn Yankees
  - 1998 - Zombie Prom
  - 1999 - Joseph and the Amazing Technicolor Dreamcoat
- 2000s
  - 2000 - Once Upon a Mattress
  - 2001 - Little Shop of Horrors
  - 2002 - Peter Pan
  - 2003 - My Fair Lady
  - 2004 - Big
  - 2005 - Bye Bye Birdie
  - 2006 - Beauty and the Beast
  - 2007 - Seussical
  - 2008 - Copacabana
  - 2009 - The Wiz
- 2010s
  - 2010 - Zombie Prom
  - 2011 - Bye Bye Birdie
  - 2012 - Anything Goes
  - 2013 - Footloose
  - 2014 - High School Musical
  - 2015 - Legally Blonde
  - 2016 - Cinderella
  - 2017 - Strange Case of Dr Jekyll and Mr Hyde
  - 2018 - The Wonderful Wizard of Oz
  - 2019 - Guys and Dolls

In the 2020s, the play stopped being just for graduating seniors and instead became a spring musical for the entire study body.

- 2020s
  - 2020 - Mama Mia (Did not open due to Covid-19)
  - 2021 - The Addams Family Musical
  - 2022 - Hairspray
  - 2023 - Cinderella (Beane musical)
  - 2024 - Mean Girls
  - 2025 - Chicago

== Demographics ==
According to Massachusetts Department of Elementary and Secondary Education annual statistics, for the 2024-2025 academic year, the demographic enrollment distributions for race, gender and grade level at Dedham High School are as follows:

Total number of enrolled students: 719
Total number of full-time equivalent educators: 69.2
Therefore, the student to teacher ratio for this school is 10.4:1

Enrollment by Race/Ethnicity (2024-2025)
| Race | Enrolled Pupils* | % of District |
|---|---|---|
| African American | 85 | 11.8% |
| Asian | 19 | 2.6% |
| Hispanic | 141 | 19.6% |
| Native American | 0 | 0% |
| White | 448 | 62.3% |
| Native Hawaiian, Pacific Islander | 0 | 0% |
| Multi-Race, Non-Hispanic | 26 | 3.6% |
| Total | 719 | 100% |

* Approximate number of enrolled pupils is calculated based on total number of students in district, multiplied by reported percentage, and rounded to nearest whole student.

Enrollment by gender (2024-2025)
| Gender | Enrolled pupils | Percentage |
|---|---|---|
| Female | 351 | 48.82% |
| Male | 364 | 50.63% |
| Non-binary | 4 | 0.56% |
| Total | 719 | 100% |

Enrollment by Grade
| Grade | Pupils Enrolled | Percentage |
|---|---|---|
| 9 | 148 | 20.58% |
| 10 | 174 | 24.2% |
| 11 | 197 | 27.4% |
| 12 | 188 | 26.15% |
| SP* | 12 | 1.67% |
| Total | 719 | 100% |

* SP = Special Education Beyond Grade 12

== Notable alumni ==
- Elizabeth Campbell Fisher Clay, noted artist
- George F. Close, US Army officer
- Leon A. Edney, former Supreme Allied Commander, NATO Atlantic Forces, United States Atlantic Command, Commodore Admiral, US Navy
- Charles A. Finn, oldest priest in the United States and son of the oldest resident of Dedham
- Joseph R. Fisher (1921–1981), Marine Corps colonel, Navy Cross recipient
- Denise Garlick, Representative in the Massachusetts General Court, Class of 1972
- Connie Hines, actress, Class of 1948
- Maryanne Lewis, former Representative in the Massachusetts General Court
- Paul McMurtry, Representative in the Massachusetts General Court, Class of 1984
- Betty Jo Nelsen, former member and minority leader of the Wisconsin State Assembly
- George F. Williams, U.S. Representative

== Works cited ==
- Dedham Historical Society (2001). Images of America: Dedham. Arcadia Publishing. ISBN 978-0-7385-0944-0.
- Smith, Frank (1936). A History of Dedham, Massachusetts. Transcript Press, Incorporated.
- Clarke, Wm. Horatio (1903). Mid-Century Memories of Dedham. Dedham Historical Society.
