= Brigadier general (United States) =

Military rank of the United States

Brigadier General
- One-star insignia of the rank of Brigadier General. Style and method of wear may vary between different uniforms and different service branches.

- Shoulder boards
- Country: United States
- Service branch: United States Army; United States Marine Corps; United States Air Force; United States Space Force
- Abbreviation: BG (USA); BGen (USMC); Brig Gen (USAF, USSF)
- Rank group: General officer
- Rank: One-star
- NATO rank code: OF-6
- Pay grade: O-7
- Formation: 1775
- Next higher rank: Major General
- Next lower rank: Colonel
- Equivalent ranks: Rear admiral (Lower Half) in the other uniformed services which use naval ranks

In the United States Armed Forces, a brigadier general is a one-star general officer in the United States Army, Marine Corps, Air Force, and Space Force.

A brigadier general ranks above a colonel and below a major general. The pay grade of brigadier general is O-7. It is equivalent to the rank of rear admiral (lower half) in the other United States uniformed services which use naval ranks. It is abbreviated as BG in the Army, BGen in the Marine Corps, and Brig Gen in the Air Force and Space Force.

The Civil Air Patrol also uses this grade for its National Vice Commander and some past National commanders.

== History ==
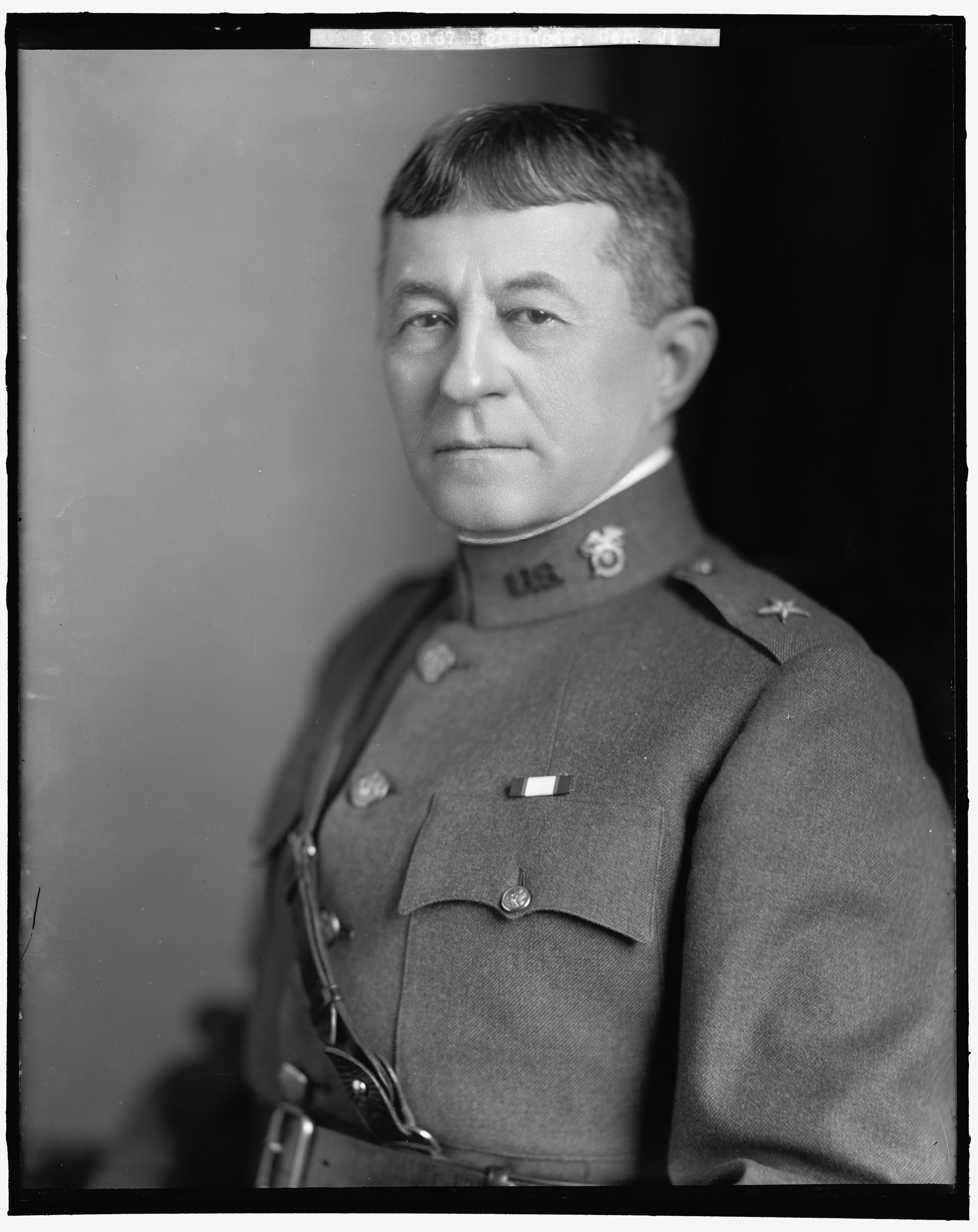
Brigadier General John B. Bellinger, photographed in 1905. Note the one-star shoulder insignia.

The rank of brigadier general has existed in the U.S. military since the inception of the Continental Army in June 1775. To prevent mistakes in recognizing officers, a general order was issued on July 14, 1775, establishing that brigadier generals would wear a ribbon, worn across the breast, between coat and waistcoat, pink in color. Later, on June 18, 1780, it was prescribed that brigadier generals would instead wear a single silver star on each epaulette. At first, brigadier generals were infantry officers who commanded a brigade; however, over the course of the 19th and 20th centuries, the responsibilities of the rank expanded significantly.

During the period from March 16, 1802, to January 11, 1812, the rank of major general was abolished and brigadier general became the highest rank in the U.S. Army. Foreseeing the need for an expanded general staff in case of war, which seemed imminent, Congress restored the rank of major general in January 1812.

The insignia for a brigadier general is one silver star worn on the shoulder or collar, and has not changed since the creation of the rank two centuries ago. Since the Mexican–American War, however, the lower rank of colonel has been the normal rank appointed to command a brigade that is organic to a division (e.g., the 1st Brigade of the 94th Infantry Division, vice the 187th Infantry Brigade). While separate brigades (e.g. the 187th, commanded by then-BG William Westmoreland in Korea) were traditionally commanded by brigadier generals, this practice has ceased in recent history.

Today, an Army or Marine Corps "BG" or "BGen," respectively, typically serves as deputy commander to the commanding general of a division or division-sized units and assists in overseeing the planning and coordination of a mission. A Marine Expeditionary Brigade (MEB), as the medium capability (and sized) scalable Marine Air Ground Task Force (MAGTF) with up to 20,000 Marines, is normally commanded by a Marine BGen. An Air Force brigadier general typically commands a large wing or serves as the deputy commander for a NAF. Additionally, one-star officers of all services may serve as high-level staff officers in large military organizations.

== Statutory limits ==
U.S. law explicitly limits the total number of general officers who may be on active duty. The total number of active duty general officers is capped at 219 for the Army, 64 for the Marine Corps, 171 for the Air Force, and 21 for the Space Force. The President or Secretary of Defense may increase the number of slots for one branch, so long as they subtract an equal number from another. Some of these slots are reserved by statute.

U.S. brigadier general rank flags

Flag of a United States Army brigadier general

Flag of a United States Army Chaplain's Corps brigadier general

Flag of a United States Army Medical Department brigadier general

Flag of a United States Marine Corps brigadier general

Flag of a United States Air Force brigadier general

Flag of a United States Space Force brigadier general

== Promotion, appointment and tour length ==
For promotion to the permanent grade of brigadier general, eligible officers are screened by a promotion board consisting of general officers from their branch of service. This promotion board then generates a list of officers it recommends for promotion to general rank. This list is then sent to the service secretary and the Joint Chiefs for review before it can be sent to the President, through the Secretary of Defense, for consideration. The President nominates officers to be promoted from this list with the advice of the Secretary of Defense, the service secretary, and if applicable, the service's chief of staff or commandant. The President may nominate any eligible officer who is not on the recommended list if it serves in the interest of the nation, but this is uncommon. The Senate must then confirm the nominee before the officer can be promoted. Once the nominee is confirmed, they are promoted to that rank once they assume or hold an office that requires or allows an officer of that rank. For positions of office reserved by statute, the President nominates an officer for appointment to fill that position. For all five uniformed services, because the grade of brigadier general is a permanent rank, the nominee may still be screened by an in-service promotion board. The rank does not expire when the officer vacates a one-star position. Tour length varies depending on the position, by statute, or when the officer receives a new assignment. The average tour length of a one-star billet is two to four years.

== Retirement ==
Other than voluntary retirement, statute sets a number of mandates for retirement. All brigadier generals must retire after five years in grade or 30 years of service, whichever is later, unless selected or appointed for promotion, or reappointed to grade to serve longer. Otherwise, all general and flag officers must retire the month after their 64th birthday. However, the Secretary of Defense can defer a general or flag officer's retirement until the officer's 66th birthday and the President can defer it until the officer's 68th birthday. Because there are a finite number of general officer positions, one officer must retire before another can be promoted. As a result, general and flag officers typically retire well in advance of the statutory age and service limits, so as not to impede the upward career mobility of their juniors.

== See also ==
- Rear admiral
- Commodore admiral
- List of brigadier generals in the United States Regular Army before February 2, 1901
- List of United States military leaders by rank
- United States Army officer rank insignia
- United States Marine Corps officer rank insignia
- United States Air Force officer rank insignia
