= Anthony Fisher (Massachusetts politician) =

17 century New England settler & army officer

Lieutenant Anthony Fisher represented Dedham, Massachusetts in the Great and General Court. He was also a selectman for three years.

Fisher was baptized in Syleham, Suffolk in April 1591 and lived on the south bank of the River Waveney on an estate known as Wignotte. He came to America on board the Rose in 1637 and settled in Dedham. Once in Dedham he signed the Dedham Covenant. As of 2004, one of his descendants in Dedham still owned a part of his land. He briefly owned the land that came to be known as Broad Oak.

He was a member of the First Church and Parish in Dedham but was not "comfortably received into the church until March 1645 on account of his proud and haughty spirit." He was made a freeman in May 1645. In 1646, 1647, and 1671 Fisher served as a selectman. He was a Suffolk County Commissioner in 1660 and 1666. In 1649, he served in the General Court. Fisher was a Lieutenant in the colonial military.

Anthony married at least twice: (1) Alice (mother of his children), and (2) Isabel (widow of Edward Breck). He had several children, including a son named Anthony, who were all born in England. He was the father of Daniel Fisher, grandfather of Josiah Fisher, and uncle of Joshua Fisher. His father was also named Anthony.

== Works cited ==
- Worthington, Erastus (1827). The history of Dedham: from the beginning of its settlement, in September 1635, to May 1827. Dutton and Wentworth.
- Jordan, John Woolf (2004). Colonial And Revolutionary Families Of Pennsylvania. Genealogical Publishing Com. ISBN 978-0-8063-5239-8.
