= Elizabeth Campbell Fisher Clay =

American artist and painter (1871–1959)

- Born: Elizabeth Campbell Fisher; April 2, 1871; West Dedham, Massachusetts, U.S.
- Died: June 29, 1959 (aged 88); Philadelphia, Pennsylvania
- Education: Smith College; Museum of Fine Arts, Boston; New York School of Art; Art Students League of New York
- Spouse: Howard Clay (m. 1909)
- Children: 3

Elizabeth Campbell Fisher Clay (1871–1959) was an American artist and painter whose work can be broadly categorised as American Impressionist. Clay studied art in Boston, New York, and Paris. After her marriage, she lived in Halifax, West Yorkshire, England and exhibited widely mainly in the north of England but also in two exhibitions at the Royal Academy of Arts London.

== Early life ==
Elizabeth Campbell Fisher was born on April 2, 1871, in West Dedham, Massachusetts to Joseph Fisher (1805‍–‍1880) and his second wife, Mary Elizabeth Campbell (1831‍–‍1899). She attended Dedham High School and had 3 siblings: her elder sister Hattie (1857‍–‍1938), later to become Lady Fisher Smith; Joseph Lyman Fisher (1861‍–‍1941) who attended Highland Military Academy in Worcester, Massachusetts; and May, her younger sister, who died in childhood (1872‍–‍1883).

== Education ==
She was a student at Smith College in Northampton, Massachusetts, graduating in literature in 1892. She then attended classes at the Museum of Fine Arts, Boston and New York School of Art. At this time she started visiting her sister, who was living in England, and had trips to Holland and the Mediterranean including Florence, Rome and Athens.

When her mother died in 1899, she went to Paris and lived on the Quai Voltaire with other students. Here she studied in the Louvre, had portrait classes and subjects for composition under Robert Henri. Returning to New England and New York the following year she joined classes with Henri and William Merritt Chase, living then in Greenwich Village and near Madison Square. Between 1901 and 1908, she traveled most of these years to Europe, studying and painting: in England and France under Alexander Jamieson; Spain and Holland with Henri. For two winters in 1906‍–‍1907 she was painting in New York with a Chase Scholarship.

Drawing inspiration from Velasquez whom she studied in Madrid and Franz Hals from Holland, her main influence was Robert Henri whose magnetic personality went on to draw together “the Eight” (John Sloan, William Glackens, George Luks, Everett Shinn, Maurice Prendergast, Ernest Lawson, Arthur B. Davies, and Henri himself) and the Ash Can School. Henri was probably the most significant art teacher of his time and amongst his pupils at that time were nearly all the promising painters who made great names for themselves afterwards in America.

== Career ==
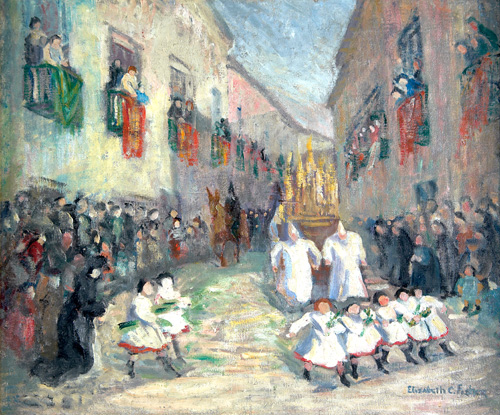
Elizabeth Campbell Fisher Clay, Holy Week in Seville, oil on canvas, 1907

Clay had a solo exhibition at Rowland's Gallery in Boston in 1908. She also exhibited in Boston at the Copley Society of Art, Boston Art Club, and City Club. In England, she continued to paint for the rest of her life. After the death of her husband in 1929 she moved to mostly floral subjects with a well-recognised, bold and skilful style. She exhibited widely for over 40 years, including the Royal Academy of Arts in 1927 and 1928; the British Society of Women Artists; Yorkshire Union of Artists; and the Royal Cambrian Academy of Art. Her work is in the collection of the Telfair Museum of Art in Savannah, Georgia.

== Marriage and family ==
In 1907 her sister Hattie was instrumental in helping romance blossom with a friend of her husband and in 1909, she married Howard Clay in Dedham, Massachusetts. He had a textile business in Halifax, England and the couple lived there after their marriage, firstly at Shibden Grange aka Godley and then moving in 1915 to Savile Place, where she spent the rest of her life. She was drawn into local politics and was Halifax Mayoress from 1917 to 1919. The couple had three children: Howard Fisher (1910‍–‍1982), who became a GP; Monica Mary (1912‍–‍1996), who became an artist herself; and Harriet Fisher (1918‍–‍2020), who became a social reformer in California.

Both Howard and Elizabeth were active on the Halifax Education Committee. In June 1930, just recently widowed, Clay laid the stone for the Halifax High School for Girls. The official opening of the school was performed by Princess Mary, Countess of Harewood. Clay was a Unitarian, where she taught Sunday school, and was active in college settlements and boys' clubs. She opposed women's suffrage. Clay was in the Lady's Who's Who in 1938.

== Death ==
She was an artist of considerable energy and died in Philadelphia, aged 88, having just crossed the Atlantic to visit her daughter, who was teaching art there. Her daughter Harriet donated an archive of her documents to the Smithsonian Institution in 2007.
