= Commodore admiral =

1982 US Navy rank

- Country: United States
- Service branch: United States Navy; United States Coast Guard
- Abbreviation: COMO
- Formation: 1982
- Abolished: 1982
- Next higher rank: Rear admiral
- Next lower rank: Captain

Commodore admiral (COMO) was a short-lived military rank of the United States Navy and United States Coast Guard that existed for fewer than 11 months during the year 1982.

== History ==
The rank of commodore admiral was established as the Navy's one-star admiral rank, after a period of more than forty years during which all Navy and Coast Guard captains, during promotions, were advanced directly to the two-star position of rear admiral, but were still paid as one-star officers in the pay grade of O-7 while in a "rear admiral, lower half" category. This was a result of the Navy Personnel Act of 3 March 1899 that eliminated the "rank" of commodore in the US Navy. The same protocol was adopted by the US Coast Guard when it was established as a military service in its current form and title in the early 1900s.

In the early 1940s, commodore was briefly reconstituted as a one-star wartime rank in the US Navy and US Coast Guard, but most promoted captains were still advanced to the two-star insignia rank of rear admiral, lower half. With nearly all of the one-star commodore incumbents promoted to rear admiral by the end of World War II, the rank of commodore was again suspended.

The new rank of commodore admiral was created both as a means to appease the other three branches of the U.S. military, who felt that promoting USN and USCG O-6s to O-7, yet entitling them to wear the insignia of an O-8, was unfair, and also as a means of distinguishing that Navy and Coast Guard one-star admirals were in fact flag officers. This had been a major problem in World War II, when cultural mistakes had led to several US Navy commodores being regarded as senior captains by members of foreign militaries and in turn denied honors due to a U.S. flag officer.

Upon its establishment, many in the leadership of the US Navy and US Coast Guard felt that the rank of Commodore Admiral violated over a century of tradition and there were numerous petitions to the Chief of Naval Operations to eliminate the rank. As a compromise, the rank of commodore admiral was changed simply to "commodore" at the start of 1983. However, this change caused even further problems internal to the Navy because senior captains commanding multiple units, e.g., those in charge of air wings and air groups, destroyer squadrons, submarine squadrons, etc., had held the honorary title of "commodore" for decades. Also, many commodore admirals found that their mail was being redirected to the base officer's club, also known as the Commissioned Officer's Mess, Open (aka COMO). As a result, the "rank" of commodore in the USN and USCG was itself abolished as a rank in 1985. It was replaced by the new rank of rear admiral (lower half), essentially the same title as before dating back to before World War II. However, this time, officers promoted to O-7 wore one-star insignia.

The rank of commodore admiral is one of the rarest ranks in the history of United States Navy and United States Coast Guard. Only a handful of officers, mainly those captains promoted to O-7 during the year 1982, have ever held the position, such as Admiral Leon A. Edney, who was promoted while serving as the commandant of midshipmen at the U.S. Naval Academy. Another famous example was that of Rear Admiral Grace Hopper.

== See also ==
- Commodore (United States)

== Bibliography ==
- Office of the Law Revision Counsel, United States. Congress. House. United States Code, Washington: The Office, 2001.
