= Early government of Dedham, Massachusetts =

The early government of Dedham, Massachusetts describes the governance of Dedham from its founding in 1636 to the turn of the 18th century. It has been described as being both "a peculiar oligarchy" and a "a most peculiar democracy." Most freemen could participate in Town Meeting, though they soon established a Board of Selectmen. Power and initiative ebbed and flowed between the two bodies.

== Background ==
The colonial settlers met for the first time on August 18, 1636, in Watertown. By September 5, 1636, their number grew from 18 at the first meeting to 25 proprietors willing to set out for the new community. By November 25, however, so few people had actually moved to Dedham that the proprietors voted to require every man to move to Dedham permanently by the first day of the following November or they would lose the land they had been granted. A few young men without families set off to spend the winter there, including Nicholas Phillips, Ezekiel Holliman, and likely Ralph Shepard, John Rogers, Lambert Genere, Joseph Shaw, and the Morses.

The first town meeting held in Dedham was on March 23, 1637. Most of the proprietors were present, and it is believed that most of them must have been living in Dedham by then.

For the first fifty years of Dedham's existence, it enjoyed a stable, tranquil government. The town elected a group of wealthy, experienced friends as Selectmen and then heeded their judgement. It also adopted a clause in the covenant that mandated mediation, which supported stability of the society. There was not so much a system of checks and balances so much as there was system where each individual voluntarily restrained himself.

Due to its unique features it was both "a peculiar oligarchy" in that only a few men were chosen for political office and "a most peculiar democracy" in that laws of suffrage changed frequently both to restrict and to expand the franchise.

== Covenant ==
While the first settlers were subject to the General Court, they had wide latitude to establish a local government as they saw fit. The first public meeting of the plantation was held on August 18, 1636. (Note: Barber has the date as August 15, 1636) A total of 18 men were present, and the town covenant was signed. It was a diverse group and included husbandmen, wool-combers, farriers, millers, linen weavers, and butchers. Many of them barely knew each other. Eventually 125 men would ascribe their names to the document. (Note: In 1636, there were 30 signers. In 1637, there were 46. By 1656, 79 men put their names on the document.)

The covenant outlined both the social ideal they hoped to achieve and the policies and procedures they would use to reach it. As the Covenant stipulated that "for the better manifestation of our true resolution herein, every man so received into the town is to subscribe hereunto his name, thereby obliging both himself and his successors after him forever." They swore they would "in the fear and reverence of our Almighty God, mutually and severally promise amongst ourselves and each to profess and practice one truth according to that most perfect rule, the foundation whereof is ever lasting love."

They also agreed that "we shall by all means labor to keep off from us all such as are contrary minded, and receive only such unto us as may be probably of one heart with us, [and such] as that we either know or may well and truly be informed to walk in a peacable conversation with all meekness of spirit, [this] for the edification of each other in the knowledge and faith of the Lord Jesus ..." It was not to be a theocracy, however, as colonial law prohibited clergy from serving as civil officers. The church and the civil society were largely separate institutions.

Before a man could join the community he underwent a public inquisition to determine his suitability. Every signer of the Covenant was required to tell all he knew of the other men and if a lie was uncovered the man who spoke it would be instantly excluded from town.

While great effort was taken to ensure disagreements were resolved before they grew into disputes, the covenant also stipulated that differences would be submitted to between one and four other members of the town for resolution. They "eschew[ed] all appeals to law and submit[ted] all disputes between them to arbitration. This arbitration system was so successful there was no need for courts. (Note: The third paragraph of the Town Covenant stated "that if at any time differences shall rise between parties of our said town, that then such party or parties shall presently refer all such differences unto some one, two or three others of our said society to be fully accorded and determined without any further delay, if it possibly may be.") The same system was used to resolve disputes with other towns.

It was also expected that once a decision was made that all would abide by it with no further dissent or debate. For the first fifty years of Dedham's existence, there were no prolonged disputes that were common in other communities. They also agreed to pay their fair share for the common good.

== Town Meeting ==
The town meeting "was the original and protean vessel of local authority. The founders of Dedham had met to discuss the policies of their new community even before the General Court had defined the nature of town government." The early meetings were informal, with all men in town likely participating. Attendance at Meetings was considered vital for the life of the community.

Even when it did not fully exercise them, "the power of the town meeting knew no limit." The town meeting

created principles to regulate taxation and land distribution; it bought land for town use and forbade the use of it forever to those who could not pay their share within a month; it decided the number of pines each family could cut from the swamp and which families could cover their house with clapboard. The men who went to that town meeting hammered out the abstract principles under which they would live and regulated the most minute details of their lives. The decisions they made then affected the lives of their children and grandchildren.

Just as the selectmen did, they enacted bylaws, appointed special committees, and granted small favors to individual residents. It was typically the meeting to voted to accepted new residents to live within the town and appointed lower officers. Votes were generally not recorded and decisions were made by consensus.

It was often the case that even after "meetings [had] been agreed upon and times appointed accordingly" many townsmen would still arrive late to the meeting and those who arrived promptly "wasted much time to their great damage." To discourage tardiness the town set fines in 1636 of one shilling for arriving more than half an hour after the "beating of the drum" and two sixpence shilling if a member was completely absent. In 1637 those fines increased to twelve pence for being late and three shillings and four pence for not arriving at all.

The more wealthy a voter was, the more likely he would attend the meeting. However, "even though no more than 58 men were eligible to come to the Dedham town meeting and to make the decisions for the town, even though the decisions to which they addressed themselves were vital to their existence, even though every inhabitant was required to live within one mile (1.6 km) of the meeting place, even though each absence from the meeting brought a fine, and even though the town crier personally visited the house of every latecomer half an hour after the meeting had begun, only 74 percent of those eligible actually showed up at the typical town meeting between 1636 and 1644."

=== Franchise ===
A colony law required all voters to be Church members until 1647, though it may not have been enforced. Even if it were, 70% of the men in town would have been eligible to participate. The law changed in 1647 and, as it was interpreted in Dedham, all men over 24 were eligible to vote.

The colony added a new requirement that a man must own taxable property of at least 20 pounds in 1658, and increased that sum to 80 pounds in 1670. The 1658 requirement reduced the number of voters from 91 to 83 members, and the 1670 increase had a grandfather clause allowing all those who previously were qualified to keep the franchise. Those not covered, however, may have to wait until they were 40 until they had accumulated enough wealth to earn the right to vote.

From 1648 to 1670, 60% to 90% of men had the right to vote. In 1686, only 25% of the taxpayers had an estate worth 80 pounds so, with those grandfathered in, only 50% of men could vote. In 1691, the property requirement was lowered back to 20 pounds bringing the percentage of men eligible to vote up from 40% to 70%.

In provincial elections, only church members could vote, limiting the share of men to 50% in 1662. The number continued to fall from there. While in many respects Dedham and Massachusetts society resembled England, the franchise was more widespread in the colony than it was in the mother country, as were the powers of local elected officials. Regardless of whether or not they were able to vote, records indicate that all men were able to attend and speak.

One needed to be present to vote, however. As some proprietors never moved to Dedham, they effectively gave up their say over how the Town would be run. Others, for whatever reason, chose not to attend. John Ellis attended meetings in Watertown but his name does not appear in the records as an attendee for nearly two years after moving to Dedham. Ezekiel Holliman felt he had been wronged by the Town and so boycotted the meetings in protest before selling his land and leaving town in July 1637.

== Selectmen ==
Year first elected	Selectman	Total years served
1639	Edward Allen	3
1639	John Kingsbury	12
1639	John Luson	2
1639	Eleazer Lusher	29
1639	John Dwight	16
1639	Robert Hinsdale	3
1639	John Bachelor	2
1640	Ralph Wheelock	1
1640	John Hayward	9
1641	Samuel Morse	2
1641	Thomas Wight	6
1641	Nathan Aldis	3
1641	Michael Metcalf	1
1641	Francis Chickering	15
1642	Henry Chickering	6
1643	Peter Woodward	16
1643	Michael Powell	4
1644	William Bullard	2
1644	Timothy Dwight	24
1645	Joseph Kingsbury	2
1645	Henry Phillips	1
1646	Anthony Fisher	2
1646	Edward Richards	9
1649	Joshua Fisher	21
1650	Daniel Fisher	32
1651	Nathaniel Colburn	5
1654	John Gay	1
1658	John Hunting	15
1658	Jonathan Fairbanks	1
1661	Richard Everett	1
1661	John Bacon	4
1661	Henry Wright	10
1661	Ralph Day	2
1661	Daniel Pond	14
1663	Thomas Fuller	14
1664	William Avery	8
1673	Richard Ellis	9
1675	John Aldis	12
1675	John Farrington	2
1677	Thomas Battelle	5
1678	Thomas Metcalf	10
1681	Nathaniel Stearns	5
1684	William Avery	22
1687	Peter Woodward	1
1688	Timothy Dwight	1
1688	James Thorpe	1
1690	John Fuller	5
1690	Daniel Fisher	9
1690	Ezra Morse	4
1690	Joseph Wight	18
1692	Asahel Smith	3
1692	Nathaniel Chickering	1
1693	Samuel Guild	20
1693	Eleazer Kingsbury	10
1694	Nathaniel Bullard	2
1697	Josiah Fisher	5
1698	Samuel Gay	1
1698	Robert Avery	1
1699	Jonathan Metcalf	1

The whole town would gather regularly to conduct public affairs, but it was "found by long experience that the general meeting of so many men ... has wasted much time to no small damage and business is thereby nothing furthered." In response, on May 3, 1639, seven selectmen were chosen "by general consent" and given "full power to contrive, execute and perform all the business and affairs of this whole town." The first board was established just a month after the ordination of church leaders, a process that was preceded by every member of the church confessing their innermost thoughts, desires, and ambitions.

Though John Allin could not be elected due to his position as the minister, those who were, were clearly very closely connected with him. Four of them, Edward Allen, Eleazer Lusher, John Luson, Robert Hinsdale, were founding members of the church. John Kingsbury was under the control of Allin's former pastor, George Phillips, and John Dwight would become Allin's business partner at the water mill. John Bachelor didn't have a direct link to Allin, but was probably elected due to his previously serving as a selectman in Watertown in 1636.

The leaders they chose "were men of proven ability who were known to hold the same values and to be seeking the same goals as their neighbors" and they were "invested with great authority." The empowering of several selectmen to administer the affairs of the town was soon seen by the whole colony to have great value, and after the General Court approved of it, nearly all towns began choosing selectmen of their own.

Soon the selectmen "enjoyed almost complete control over every aspect of local administration." They met roughly 10 times a year for formal sessions, and more often in informal subcommittees. When the Massachusetts Body of Liberties was adopted and recognized boards of selectmen for the first time, they granted them additional powers including the power to lay out roads, supervise education, and exercise social control.

They also served as a court, determining who had broken by-laws and issuing fines. Almost all townsmen would have to appear before them at one point or another during the year to ask for a swap of land, to ask to remove firewood from the common lands, or for some other purpose. In 1652 they were given responsibility for the school and held it until 1789 when a school committee was created.

In theory, the selectmen shared the power to appoint men to positions with the Town Meeting but they retained "a strong initiative" to act on their own. As the selectmen became more active, the Town Meeting became "essentially passive. It lacked initiative, its veto was quiescent," and its broad powers were not exercised. It was the selectmen who called for a gathering of the Town Meeting and they generally called very few. The board also prepared the agenda for the meeting, which gave them a degree of control over it.

The selectmen wrote most of the laws in the town and they levied taxes on their fellow townsmen. They could also approve expenditures. The selectmen were charged with deciding who sat where in the meetinghouse. When difficult problems arose, the selectmen would often appoint a special committee to look into the matter and report back.

If a man served three terms and met with the satisfaction of the community, he tended to stay on the board for many years following. In 1671, the board had 100 years of cumulative experience. During early years, roughly one in three men would serve as selectman at some point during their lives but, by 1736, fewer than one in six would.

=== Demographics ===
Selectmen were "the most powerful men in town. As men, they were few in number, old, and relatively rich and saints of the church." It was not required that a man be wealthy to serve, but it improved his chances of getting elected. Even those who were among the wealthiest, however, still had lifestyles that were remarkably similar to those with less as the spectrum of wealth was narrow. Throughout the 17th century the selectmen, "particularly those elected again and again for ten or twenty years, owned considerably more land than the average citizen. Selectmen who served between 1640 and 1740 were almost always among the wealthiest 20 percent of the town. In any given year a majority of a particular board were among the richest 10%."

Men who were not members of the church were still allowed to hold town office. However, in light of the "high rate of admissions, the townsmen may have assumed that [they] would be members soon enough." A large majority of those who served were members, however.

The men chosen to serve were consistently sent back to serve multiple year-long terms on the board. Between 1637 and 1639 there were 43 different men chosen as selectmen; they served on average eight terms each. In that time period there were 10 men who served an average of 20 terms each. They made up only 5% of the population but filled 60% of the seats on the Board. An additional 15 men served an average of 10 terms each, filling 30% of the seats. These 15 usually left office only when they had an early death or they removed from town. If a man served more than three terms he could usually count on returning for many more.

The burdens of office could take up to a third of their time during busy seasons. They served without salary and came up through the ranks of lower offices. In return they became "men of immense prestige" and were frequently selected to serve in other high posts. During the 17th century, the selectmen were "an artificial aristocracy." Chances are either they or their fathers may have immigrated from England with slightly more wealth than average. Some helped write the covenant or helped convince the General Court to incorporate the plantation as a town. Their status as an aristocrat rested upon their status as a leader of a Utopian community, however, not because they had immense wealth.

=== Election of 1669 ===
The Town gathered on January 4, 1669, to elect selectmen for the year. At the end of the meeting, Peter Woodward was declared one of the winners. Many supporters of Anthony Fisher alleged fraud, however, and Woodward refused to serve until the question was resolved. The Town met again on January 8, and this time voted by secret ballot. Fisher was elected.

== Relationship between Town Meeting and Selectmen ==
=== Early years ===
While the Meeting soon appointed selectmen to handle most of the town's affairs, it was the meeting that created the Board and the Meeting could just as easily dissolve it. However, "its theoretical powers were for the most part symbolic" and "[f]ormal review of the acts and accounts of the executive was sporadic and at best perfunctory."

After creation of the Board of Selectmen, meetings were generally called only twice a year and usually did not stray far from the agenda prepared for them by the selectmen. In fact, the Meeting would often refer issues to the Selectmen to act upon or to "prepare and ripen the answer" to a difficult question. Town Meeting typically took on only routine business, such as the election of officers or setting the minister's salary, and left other business to the selectmen.

Though the Meeting gave "full power" to the Selectmen when they were first established, the Meeting periodically voted to either affirm, deny, or revise those powers. The Meeting would occasionally vote on the actions of the Selectmen, and choose to either approve or disapprove of them, but never overturned a substantive decision made by the board. In practice, they existed as a legislative veto of the selectmen's power. In the exercise of legislative, appointive, financial, judicial, and administrative power, the selectmen were the superior of town meeting.

In 1660, the Meeting voted against a motion to give the current Selectmen the same powers the previous board had and, to underscore their disapproval, then voted the entire Board out of office. It was the only time an entire board of seven selectmen was voted out. After Edmund Andros was deposed as administrator of the Dominion of New England on April 18, 1689, following news that James II of England was overthrown, the people of Dedham rejected every selectman who served during Andros' rule. Of the eight men who served from 1687 to 1689, only one would ever be returned to the board and he served only for a single year. Five new men, all of whom supported the 1689 Boston revolt and who had just a collective total of two years serving on the board, replaced those who had a total of 50 years service between them.

=== Town Meeting reasserts control ===
Metric	1636 to 1686	1687 to 1736
Average turnover	1.88 of 7 (27%)	2 of 5 (40%)
Average recruitment of new selectmen	.7 of 7 (10%)	1.1 of 5 (22%)
New men recruited	35	55
Average terms served	7.6	4.8
Percent who serve more than 10 terms	35%	7%
Average cumulative experience of the board	55 years	25 years

In the late 1600s and early 1700s, Town Meeting began to assert more authority and fewer decisions were left to the judgment of the selectmen. Over the course of 30–40 years, small innovations brought the initiative back to the meeting and away from the board. It brought back a balance of power between the two bodies which, in theory, had always existed, but which in practice had been tilted to the selectmen.

One of the most prominent ways they did so was by calling for more meetings. In the first 50 years of existence, town meetings were held on average about twice a year but by 1700 it was held four or five times each year. The agenda also grew longer and included an open ended item that allowed them to discuss any item they liked, and not just the topics the selectmen placed upon the warrant.

It also asserted more control over finances by appointing a treasurer, constables, and assessors, as well as authorizing every tax imposed. It also gave much greater scrutiny to the appropriations and revenues requested by the board. Town Meeting also began appointing a committee to audit the finances of the town each year beginning in 1726.

Following a practice that was sporadic beginning 1690, Town Meeting also regularly began electing a moderator after 1715 to preside. During the same time period, Town Meeting began appointing officials to handle duties that were previously left to the selectmen. Town Meeting also began writing and adopting by-laws, taking back a practice that had long been left to the selectmen.

By taking on small tasks, like granting favors to residents, and large ones, like deciding to expand the meetinghouse, the town meeting demonstrated a lack of confidence in their leaders. It also became increasing likely in the years following 1658 for incumbent selectmen to be voted out of office and for new men to be elected in their place. Despite this, Selectmen were still respected in the community and the selectmen still came from the ranks of wealthier residents, partly because they needed to have the free time to devote to the office.

The Board of Selectmen was originally created to take some of the workload off of the Town Meeting, but now the meeting was increasing the burden on itself. To resolve this problem, they began creating ad hoc committees to look into and resolve specific issues. The number of selectmen was also reduced from seven to five during this time.

== Town Clerks ==
The first Town Clerk was elected on May 17, 1639.

Year first elected	Town Clerk	Total years served
1639	Edward Alleyn	2
1641	Eleazer Lusher	23
1643	Michael Powell	4
1657	Joshua Fisher (Note: He also served in 1658, 1662, and 1663.)	4
1661	Timothy Dwight	10
1681	Nathaniel Sterns	5
1687	Thomas Battelle	2
1690	John Fuller	4
1694	William Avery	15

== Representation in the General Court ==
Year	Representative	Notes
1641	Michael Powell	
1642	Henry Chickering	
1643	Henry Chickering	
1644	Francis Chickering; Henry Chickering	
1645	Francis Chickering; John Hayward	
1646	Francis Chickering	
1647	John Kingsbury; Francis Chickering	
1648	Michael Powell; Francis Chickering	
1649	Francis Chickering; Anthony Fisher	
1650	Francis Chickering	
1651	Francis Chickering; Henry Chickering	
1652	Francis Chickering	
1653	Joshua Fisher	
1658	Joshua Fisher	
1662	Joshua Fisher	
1663	Joshua Fisher	
1664	Joshua Fisher	
1665	Peter Woodward	
1667	Joshua Fisher	
1668	Joshua Fisher	
1669	William Avery; Peter Woodward	
1670	Peter Woodward	
1671	Joshua Fisher; Daniel Fisher	
1672	Joshua Fisher	
1683	John Aldis	
1691	Timothy Dwight	
1692	Timothy Dwight	
1696	John Fuller	
1697	Thomas Metcalf	
1698	Asahel Smith	
1699	Josiah Fisher	

For 45 of the first 50 years of Dedham's existence, one of the 10 selectmen who served most often also served in "the one superior [the town] recognized, the General Court." In colonial Massachusetts, each town sent two deputies to the General Court each year. Three men, Joshua Fisher, Daniel Fisher, and Eleazer Lusher, virtually monopolized the post between 1650 and 1685.

A group of notable clergy from around the colony, including Dedham's John Allin, wrote a petition to the General Court in 1671 complaining that the lawmakers were contributing to anti-clerical sentiment. They asked for the General Court to endorse the authority of the clergy in spiritual matters, which by implication included the half-way covenant. The General Court complied but 15 members, including Joshua Fisher and Daniel Fisher, dissented.

== Works cited ==
- Hanson, Robert Brand (1976). Dedham, Massachusetts, 1635-1890. Dedham Historical Society.
- Worthington, Erastus (1827). The history of Dedham: from the beginning of its settlement, in September 1635, to May 1827. Dutton and Wentworth.
- Lockridge, Kenneth (1985). A New England Town. New York: W.W. Norton & Company. ISBN 978-0-393-95459-3.
- Whittemore, Henry (1967). Genealogical Guide to the Early Settlers of America: With a Brief History of Those of the First Generation and References to the Various Local Histories, and Other Sources of Information where Additional Data May be Found. Genealogical Publishing Com. ISBN 978-0-8063-0378-9.
- Jordan, John Woolf (2004). Colonial And Revolutionary Families Of Pennsylvania. Genealogical Publishing Com. ISBN 978-0-8063-5239-8.
- Goodwin, Nathaniel (1982). Genealogical Notes Or Contributions to the Family History of Some of the First Settlers of Connecticut and Massachusetts. Genealogical Publishing Com. ISBN 978-0-8063-0159-4.
- Carter, Jane Greenough Avery; Holmes, Susie Perry (1893). Genealogical Record of the Dedham Branch of the Avery Family in America. Press of Avery & Doten. pp. 19–34.
- Dwight, Benjamin Woodbridge (1874). The History of the Descendants of John Dwight, of Dedham, Mass. J. F. Trow & son, printers and bookbinders.
- Lockridge, Kenneth A.; Kreider, Alan (1966). "The Evolution of Massachusetts Town Government, 1640 to 1740". The William and Mary Quarterly. 23 (4): 549–574. doi:10.2307/1919125. JSTOR 1919125.
- Mansbridge, Jane J. (1980). Beyond Adversary Democracy. New York: Basic Books.
- Smith, Frank (1936). A History of Dedham, Massachusetts. Transcript Press, Incorporated.
- Barber, John Warner (1848). Historical Collections: Being a General Collection of Interesting Facts, Traditions, Biographical Sketches, Anecdotes, &c., Relating to the History and Antiquities of Every Town in Massachusetts, with Geographical Descriptions. Lazell. pp. 455–463.
- Brown, Richard D.; Tager, Jack (2000). Massachusetts: A concise history. University of Massachusetts Press. ISBN 978-1558492493.
- Fisher, Phillip A. (1898). The Fisher Genealogy: A Record of the Descendants of Joshua, Anthony, and Cornelius Fisher, of Dedham, Mass., 1630-1640. Massachusetts Publishing Company. ISBN 978-0-608-32125-7.
