= Dedham Covenant =

The Dedham Covenant was a covenant that governed the early settlement of Dedham, Massachusetts. It mandated that only those with similar, Puritan, community values could live in the town and set about a method for mediating disputes. It also required each resident to pay their fair share of taxes for the common good. Eventually 125 men would sign the covenant.

== Background ==
In 1635 there were rumors in the Massachusetts Bay Colony that a war with the local Indians was impending and a fear arose that the few, small, coastal communities that existed were in danger of attack. This, in addition to the belief that the few towns that did exist were too close together, prompted the Massachusetts General Court to establish two new inland communities, Dedham and Concord.

As Puritans, the first settlers came to Massachusetts in order to live and worship as they pleased. While they were subject to the General Court, they had wide latitude to establish a local government as they saw fit. The first public meeting of the plantation was held on August 18, 1636. (Note: Barber has the date as August 15, 1636.) A total of 18 men were present, and the town covenant was signed. The covenant outlined both the social ideal they hoped to achieve and the policies and procedures they would use to reach it. Eventually, 125 men would ascribe their names to the document. In 1636, there were 30 signers. In 1637, there were 46. By 1656, 79 men put their names on the document.

The Covenant was intended to extend beyond the lifetimes of those who wrote it and to be binding upon all residents in perpetuity. The Covenant was no longer enforced nor served as the guide for every decision by the time the town reached its 50th anniversary. It lasted well into the second generation which was, according to one commentator, "longer than anyone had a right to expect".

== Commitment to shared ideals ==
The covenant stipulated that only those "may be probably of one heart with us," in essence those who held the same Puritan Christian beliefs, could be admitted to the community. They swore they would "in the fear and reverence of our Almighty God, mutually and severally promise amongst ourselves and each to profess and practice one truth according to that most perfect rule, the foundation whereof is ever lasting love." While it was drafted by the first settlers of the town, new members would be admitted on an equal footing if they held the same community values.

None who were not committed to this ideal, nor those considered morally unfit, were to be admitted as townsmen. If the need arose, they were to be expelled. The commitment in the Covenant to allow only like-minded individuals to live within the town explains why "church records show no instances of dissension, Quaker or Baptist expulsions, or witchcraft persecutions."

The requirement to only allow those who were of a similar mind made it easier to lived a shared ideal. The goal was to create a godly community, thus ensuring that God's favor would be upon them. It was not to be a theocracy, however, as colonial law prohibited clergy from serving as civil officers. The church and the civil society were largely separate institutions.

== Mediation ==
The Covenant mandated mediation when disputes arose between residents. While great effort was taken to ensure disagreements were resolved before they grew into disputes, the covenant also stipulated that differences would be submitted to between one and four other members of the town for resolution. They "eschew[ed] all appeals to law and submit[ted] all disputes between them to arbitration." This arbitration system was so successful there was no need for courts. The same system was used to resolve disputes with other towns.

As a result, residents were sometimes expected to endure unpleasant situations for the greater good in a self-sacrificial way. Once a decision was made, all were to abide by it with no further dissent or debate. For the first fifty years of Dedham's existence, there were no prolonged disputes that were common in other communities.

== Signers ==
The Covenant was first signed on August 15, 1636. Five signers of the covenant, John Allen, Thomas Carter, Timothy Dalton, Samuel Morse, and Ralph Wheelock, were university graduates.

The 125 signatories of the Covenant, in the order in which they signed, are:

1. Robert Feake
2. Edward Alleyn
3. Samuel Morse
4. Philemon Dalton
5. John Dwight
6. Lambert Generye
7. Richard Euered [Everett]
8. Ralph Shepheard
9. John Huggin
10. Ralph Wheelock
11. Thomas Cakebread
12. Henry Phillips
13. Timothie Dalton
14. Thomas Carter
15. Abraham Shawe
16. John Coolidge
17. Nicholas Phillips
18. John Gaye
19. John Kingsbury
20. John Rogers
21. Francis Austen
22. Ezekiel Holliman
23. Joseph Shawe
24. William Bearstowe
25. John Haward
26. Thomas Bartlet
27. Ferdinandoe Adams
28. Daniell Morse
29. Joseph Morse
30. John Ellice
31. Jonathan Fairbanks
32. John Eaton
33. Michaell Metcalfe
34. John Morse
35. John Allin
36. Anthony Fisher
37. Thomas Wight
38. Eleazer Lusher
39. Robert Hinsdell
40. John Luson
41. John Fisher
42. Thomas Fisher
43. Joseph Kingsberye
44. John Batchelor
45. Nathaniell Coaleburne
46. John Roper
47. Martin Philips
48. Henry Smyth
49. John Fraerye
50. Thomas Hastings
51. Francis Chickering
52. Thomas Alcock
53. William Bullard
54. Jonas Humphery
55. Edward Kempe
56. John Hunting
57. Tymothie Dwight
58. Henry Deengaine
59. Henry Brocke
60. James Hering
61. Nathan Aldus
62. Edward Richards
63. Michaell Powell
64. John Elderkine
65. Michaell Bacon
66. Robert Onion
67. Samuell Milles
68. Edward Colver
69. Thomas Bayes
70. George Bearstowe
71. John Bullard
72. Thomas Leader
73. Joseph Moyes
74. Jeffery Mingeye
75. James Allin
76. Richard Barber
77. Thomas Jordan
78. Joshua Fisher
79. Christopher Smith
80. John Thurston
81. Joseph Clarke
82. Thomas Eames
83. Peter Woodward
84. Thwaits Strickland
85. John Guild
86. Samuell Bulleyne
87. Robert Gowen
88. Hugh Stacey
89. George Barber
90. James Jordan
91. Nathaniell Whiteing
92. Beniamine Smith
93. Richard Ellice
94. Austen Kalem
95. Robert Ware
96. Thomas Fuller
97. Thomas Payne
98. John Fayerbanke
99. Henry Glover
100. Thomas Hering
101. John Plimption
102. George Fayerbanke
103. Tymoth Dwight
104. Andr Duein
105. Joseph Ellice
106. Ralph Freeman
107. Joh: Rice
108. Danll Ponde
109. John Hovghton
110. Jonathan Fayerbank Jr.
111. James Vales
112. Thomas Metcalfe
113. Robert Crossman
114. William Avery
115. John Aldus
116. John Mason
117. Isaac Bullard
118. Cornelus Fisher
119. John Partridge
120. James Draper
121. James Thorpe
122. Samuell Fisher
123. B. Benjamin Bullard
124. Ellice W. Woode
125. Thomas Fisher

== Text ==
I The Society Covenant in these terms, viz.

1. We whose names are hereunto subscribed, do in the fear and reverence of our almighty God, mutually and severally promise amongst ourselves and each to other, to profess and practice one faith, according to that most perfect rule, the foundation whereof is everlasting love.

2. That we shall by all means labor to keep off from us, all such as are contrary minded; and receive only such unto us, as be such, as may be probably of one heart with us; as that we either know, or may well and truly be informed to walk in a peaceable conversation with all meekness of spirit, for the edification of each other in the knowledge and faith of the Lord Jesus; and the mutual encouragement unto all temporal comforts in all things; seeking the good of each other, of all which may be derived true peace.

3. That if at any time difference shall arise between parties of our said town, that then such party and parties, shall presently refer all such difference unto one, two, or three others of our said society, to be fully accorded and determined, without any further delay if it possibly may be.

4. That every man that now, or any time hereafter, shall have lots in our town, shall pay his share in all such rates of money and charges as shall be ims upon him rateably in proportion with other men, as also become freely subject unto all such orders and constitutions, as shall be necessarily had or made, now at any time hereafter from this day forward, as well for loving and comfortable society in our said town, as also for the prosperous and thriving condition of our said fellowship, especially respecting the fear of God, in which we desire to g and continue, whatsoever we shall by his loving favor take in hand.

5. And for the better manifestation of our true resolution herein, every man so received, to subscribe hereunto his name, thereby obliging both himself and his successors after him for ever as we have done.

== Works cited ==
- Barkalow, Jordon B. (September 2004). "Changing Patterns of Obligation and the Emergence of Individualism in American Political Thought". Political Research Quarterly. 57 (3): 491–500. doi:10.1177/106591290405700313. S2CID 143984937.
- Barber, John Warner (1848). Historical Collections: Being a General Collection of Interesting Facts, Traditions, Biographical Sketches, Anecdotes, &c., Relating to the History and Antiquities of Every Town in Massachusetts, with Geographical Descriptions. Lazell. pp. 455–463.
- Brown, Richard D.; Tager, Jack (2000). Massachusetts: A concise history. University of Massachusetts Press. ISBN 978-1558492493.
- Hill, Don Gleason, ed. (1892). The Early Records of the Town of Dedham, Massachusetts. 1636–1659. Vol. 3. Dedham Transcript.
- Lockridge, Kenneth (1985). A New England Town. New York: W.W. Norton & Company. ISBN 978-0-393-95459-3.
- Lutz, Donald S. (1998). Colonial origins of the American Constitution: a documentary history. Liberty Fund. ISBN 978-0-86597-156-1.
- Mansbridge, Jane J. (1980). Beyond Adversary Democracy. New York: Basic Books. ISBN 9780465006571.
- Smith, Frank (1936). A History of Dedham, Massachusetts. Transcript Press, Incorporated.
