= History of education in Dedham, Massachusetts =

The history of education in Dedham, Massachusetts covers schools and schooling from the establishment of the first public school in America to the present. It includes the history of the Dedham Public Schools, several Catholic schools, and other private schools. It also includes two institutions of higher education.

== First public school ==
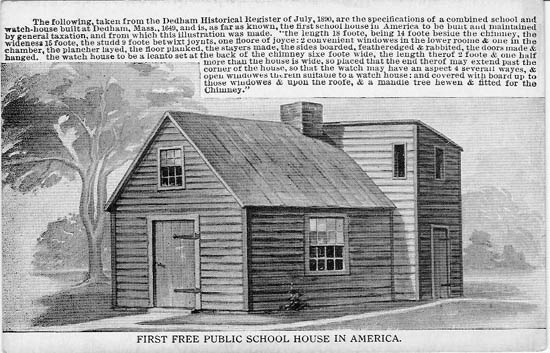
The first taxpayer-funded public school in the United States was in Dedham, Massachusetts

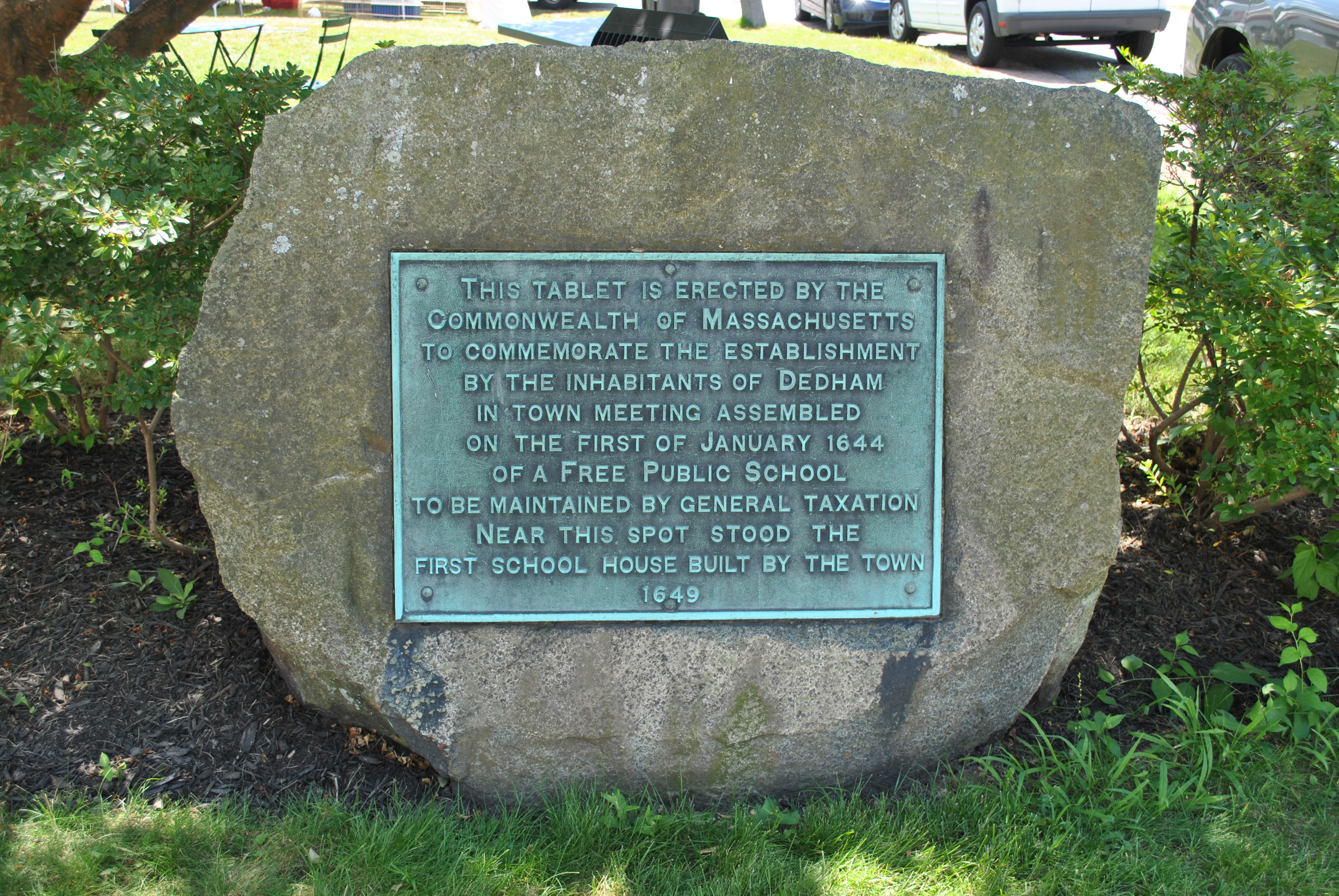
Stone plaque marking the site of the first public school in America. Located on First Church Green in Dedham, Massachusetts

On January 1, 1644, by unanimous vote, Dedham authorized the first U.S. taxpayer-funded public school; "the seed of American education." Its first teacher, Rev. Ralph Wheelock, was paid 20 pounds annually to instruct the youth of the community. John Thurston was commissioned by the town to build the first schoolhouse in 1648 for which he received a partial payment of £11.0.3 on December 2, 1650. The details in the contract require him to construct floorboards, doors, and "fitting the interior with 'featheredged and rabbited' boarding" similar to that found in the Fairbanks House.

By the later part of the century, however, a sentiment of anti-intellectualism had pervaded the town. Residents were content to allow the minister to be the local intellectual and did not establish a grammar school as required by law. As a result, the town was called into court in 1675 and then again in 1691.

Other schools, including Boston Latin School and the Town of Rehoboth have claimed to be the first public school, but Dedham's was the first to be supported exclusively by tax dollars. Lt. Governor Roger Wolcott led a committee that heard the claims of several cities and towns, including the presentation made by Dedham's Don Gleason Hill and Rev. Carlos Slafter. Governor Frederic T. Greenhalge and the Governor's Council. confirmed that Dedham's was the first. On June 17, 1898, a monument was unveiled on the grounds of the First Church Green, near the site of the original schoolhouse.

=== First schoolhouse ===
The first classes were likely in the meetinghouse. The first schoolhouse was built in present-day Dedham Square near the First Church and Parish in Dedham by Thomas Thurston at a cost of £11 3 pence. Approved at a town meeting in January 1648–9, it measured 15' by 18' with two windows and a fireplace. Each boy was responsible for providing his share of firewood during the colder months. The building likely resembled contemporary schools in the English countryside with a raised platform, wooden wainscoting, and high windows. The teacher's desk would look like a pulpit and students would sit on plank seats.

The schoolhouse also included a watchtower at one end to prevent Indian attack. Placing the school next to the church was deliberate and symbolized the need for both academic and moral instruction. It stood for nearly 50 years, although in 1661 school was kept in the house of the teacher, Francis Chickering.

=== Other early educational efforts ===
The early residents of Dedham were so committed to education that they donated £4.6.6 to Harvard College during its first eight years of existence, a sum greater than many other towns, including Cambridge itself.

On March 16, 1695, Dedham and several other towns established a 300-acre School Farm in what is today Wellesley, Massachusetts, near Wellesley College. It did not prove to be profitable, and so it was sold on March 13, 1699, for 50 pounds.

== Dedham Public Schools ==
On January 2, 1643, the Town Meeting set aside land for three public purposes: a school, a church, and a training field. Two years later, on January 1, 1645, by unanimous vote, the Town of Dedham authorized the first taxpayer-funded public school in the United States. It is believed the success of Dedham's school helped convince the Great and General Court to enact a law mandating schools in every community. Dedham's delegates to that body also served on the local School Committee.

School was held year round, with students attending from 7 a.m. to 5 p.m. in the summer and 8 a.m. to 4 p.m. in the winter. Initially held in the village center, the school began travelling around town as families moved to outlying areas. From 1717 to 1756, school was held in different parts of town according to population and taxation. In 1762, for example, it was held in the village for 166 days, in South Dedham for 79 days, in Clapboard Trees, for 69 days, and in the West Precinct for 52 days. When in the outer precincts, classes were often held in private homes, but in some parts of Dedham residents privately built schoolhouses. One such school, in Springfield, was built by residents before that part of town had even organized as a parish. In addition, both boys and girls attended dame schools.

Many schools were built in the years following 1897, and were adorned through purchase and donation with a number of works of art. In 1896, the Avery School began running a program to teach illiterate adults how to read. There was also in the 1840s a Lyceum that put on plays in addition to the usual public education programs.

=== Establishment of a high school ===
As early as 1827 the Commonwealth of Massachusetts required all towns with more than 500 families to establish a free public high school. Beginning in 1844 the School Committee repeatedly began recommending that the town establish a high school. It wasn't until 1850 when, under threat of a lawsuit, that the town meeting voted to "instruct the Town's School Committee to hire a building and teacher, and establish a High School according to law." A sum of $3,000 was appropriated to support it.

=== Kindergartens ===
A kindergarten supported by private subscription was established at the Ames School in 1893 and ran until 1896. In that year the town appropriated money for kindergartens at the Ames, Avery, and Oakdale Schools, but they did not last long.

=== Teachers ===
The first teacher, Rev. Ralph Wheelock, was paid 20 pounds annually to instruct the youth of the community. Descendants of these students would become presidents of Dartmouth College, Yale University, and Harvard University.

Michael Metcalf was hired as a teacher in 1656 at the age of 70 and John Swinerton was hired in 1663. Joshua Fisher and Thomas Battle also taught during the early years of the school. Battle, Metcalf, and Fisher were all farmers who stepped in to teach when a professional teacher could not be found. As they had their own farms to manage in addition, their pay was not docked unless they missed an entire week's worth of classes. Until he left to minister to the people of the new community of Wrentham in 1671, Rev. Samuel Man also served as teacher.

Sir Joseph Belcher, the son of Rev. Joseph Belcher, was the first teacher to travel to the various precincts to hold classes. In 1766, Manasseh Cutler, a future congressman and "father of Ohio University," began teaching.

Charles J. Capen started a private school in 1849 and then became the first high school teacher when it was established the following year.

=== School Committee and administration ===
The school was originally controlled by the town meeting but, in 1652, it was put under the control of the Selectmen. In 1789, as the town was split into districts, a school committee was formed. Clergymen were elected to oversee the schools. In the mid-1800s, the school committee consisted of Rev. Alvan Lamson, Rev. Samuel Babcock, and Rev. Calvin Durfee. While living in Dedham, Horace Mann served on the School Committee.

In 1880, the growth of the schools required that a professional superintendent of schools be hired to oversee them. I. Freeman Hall, who had previously taught in Quincy, was hired. His successors through 1936 include Abner J. Phipps, Henry E. Crocker, Guy Channel, Oscar S. Williams, Roderick W. Hine, (Note: According to Smith, "most of the improvements in the curriculum of the Dedham Schools were made during the superintendency of Mr. Hine.") and John C. Anthony.

From 1956 to 2004, the administration's offices were housed in the "White House" originally built by Charles and Mary Shaw at the corner of East Street and Whiting Avenue. In 2004 they moved to the B-wing of Dedham High School as the house was razed to make room for the new Dedham Middle School.

=== Finances ===
The teacher's salary was paid by taxes. For every boy between the ages of four and 14, a tax of between three-and-a-half to five shillings was assessed, depending on how far from the school the family lived. Families who lived more than 2.5 miles from the meetinghouse were exempt from the tax until their children started attending. This covered between 25% and 50% of the total cost, with the rest made up by a tax on the estates of the entire population. In the years following the passage of the Old Deluder Satan Law, Dedham was occasionally fined for not spending enough money of its school but, for the most part, the appropriations to the school were generous.

The schoolmaster's salary was initially set at £20 and was raised in 1695 to £25. As there was little specie in the colony at the time, salaries were instead paid in wheat and corn. Michael Metcalf, for example, received five pounds of each crop at every six months. Not until 1696 did teachers receive actual money for their labor. While the salary was not high, teachers earned a great deal of respect. Records show that teachers were given the honorary title of "sir" at a time when most men were not even referred to as "mister."

The first donation to the school was made by Dr. Henry Deengaine of Roxbury. His deathbed will, taken verbally by John Eliot and approved by Governor John Winthrop, left £3 to the school. In 1680, Dr. William Avery gave £60, and the Honorable Samuel Dexter left $170 in his will. Dexter requested that his bequest, along with several other sums previously donated for the school but were used to hire soldiers instead, be returned to the school. The town agreed to the terms but this fund, along with other school funds, subsequently disappeared. A fund established by Deacon Nathaniel Kingsbury in 1749 had a corpus of £100, the interest of which was to be used for the schools.

On January 1, 1744–5, school trust funds had a balance of £236, 2s, 8d. By 1749–50, the account had £345, 8s, which was loaned out to 12 men in sums between £5 and £100.

=== Districts ===
With the town growing and multiple schoolhouses being built, the school was essentially split into districts in 1756. The districts were not established by law, however, until 1789. As early as 1848, Rev. Dr. Alvan Lamson of the First Church and Parish in Dedham was making the argument that the districts should be abolished and Horace Mann said that the law allowing districts was "beyond comparison, the most pernicious law ever pass in the Commonwealth on the subject of schools." The districts were discontinued in 1866 when the Town purchased all 11 buildings for a total of $49,180 and returned their value to the taxpayers of the respective districts.

== Catholic schools ==
=== St. Mary's School and Asylum ===
In 1866 the Sisters of Charity founded the St. Mary's School and Asylum at what was formerly the Norfolk House. The property was sold to them (Note: Actually sold to Ann Alexis Shorb, Andrea Corry, and Aloysia Reed as trustees.) for $1 by Martin Bates who, out of a "spirit of vindictiveness," gave it to the Sisters because the Town of Dedham would not purchase the run down building from him at his asking price. Bates, who was not Catholic, had previously tried selling the building at auction, but could find no buyer willing to pay a price equal to his mortgage. At news of the sale, the Dedham Gazette wrote in an editorial:

Whatever prejudices may naturally exist against the establishment of a Roman Catholic School in so central a location, the community cannot but feel that the transformation of a building recently used only for the indiscriminate sale of liquors into an institution founded for 'promoting virtue, learning and piety in the town of Dedham' is an object worthy only of the most exalted motives, and in this view should be accepted as a public blessing.

The school was situated far away from the homes of many parishioners of the local Catholic Church, St. Mary's, and thus they did not send their children to it. Since they did not send their children to it, they did not support it financially either. The school held a number of fundraisers, but with the heavy debt of the parish the school closed on June 27, 1879. It would have cost the parish $1,500 a year to keep it open. The closure was intended to be temporary, but it never reopened. The building was sold in 1905.

=== St. Mary's Parish School ===
Rev. Robert J. Johnson, pastor of St. Mary's Church, the parish purchased a large lot of land to one day be used as a school. Several decades later, a parochial school was started in 1932 by Father George P. O'Connor and run by the Sisters of St. Joseph.

For the first few years the school was limited by the lack of space, and classes were held in the convent. On June 16, 1935, the cornerstone for a new school was laid using the same golden trowel with ivory handle that was used in 1880 for the church. A crowd of 500 attended the ceremony.

In September 1936, the new building on High Street was open. On Sunday, January 24, 1954, it was announced that an increase in the school population required more space. The new school was constructed on the Greenhood Estate on High Street, which had been purchased several years before. The cost of the 16-room school was estimated to be $450,000.

A new addition was constructed in 1958, and the student population grew to 650. In 1966 it had over 800 students. It was in the 1960s that the 8th grade was added. The school had two classes per grade, with both nuns and laity as teachers. The school had a debt of $250,000, but it was paid off by 1966.

In December 1973, the pastor, Monsignor Charles Dewey, announced the school would close in 1975. At the time, 9 nuns taught 16 classes comprising 525 students. The graduating class had 85 students and two teachers. The building was razed in 2010.

=== Ursuline Academy ===
The first Ursuline Academy in the Boston area opened in Charlestown in 1819. In 1957, the growing school relocated to a 28-acre campus on Federal Hill in Dedham. It provides education in all areas and offers over 20 clubs and 15 varsity sports. The Boston Globe has praised Ursuline's athletes, the Bears, as winning the Singelais Award for maintaining a 3.0 GPA or higher and excelling in their chosen activity.

On October 18, 2024, a mass was held in the gymnasium at the academy to mark the transfer of sponsorship from the Ursuline Sisters to the Ursuline Education Foundation, a lay-led organization. During the mass, a silver ciborium was transferred from Sister Elisa Ryan, the prioress of the Ursuline Sisters of the Central Province, to Kate Levesque, the head of school.

The ciborium was originally used by the French Navy in the 1700s and eventually was given to a Boston priest, possibly Bishop Jean-Louis Lefebvre de Cheverus. It was used by the sisters in Charlestown before the Ursuline Convent riots in 1834, and was saved when a group of sisters hid it below a clump of asparagus in the garden. It eventually made its way into the Boston College archives before being returned to Ursuline Academy for the transfer of sponsorship.

== Other private schools ==
=== East Dedham evening schools ===
==== 1870s ====
In 1870, an evening school was established in East Dedham for those who could not attend the day school because they were busy working in the mills along Mother Brook. Students ranged in age from nine to 35 years old, and met on Tuesday, Thursday, and Saturday evenings for an hour and a half.

Some students were learning to read and write for the first time, and others were learning English. During the first seven weeks it was offered, there was an average of 120 students attending each session. This was approximately 25% of the entire workforce in the mills. Royal O. Storrs, the overseer of the mills, was a major contributor to the school.

==== 1880s ====
In 1882, there was a public debate about whether or not the Town should provide an evening school in East Dedham. There was a general reluctance to pay for a school in the neighborhood that would educate immigrants and their children.

Volunteers began a night school at the Avery School two nights a week from January to March, when the reduced daylight resulted in shorter hours at the mills. Students, between the ages of 15–40, were limited to 40 though 86 expressed a desire to attend. Each paid 10 cents per class with the money raised was used to purchase stationary.

Attendance began to drop, however, as the volunteer teachers were not reliably attending. It was argued that if they were being paid, perhaps they would show up as "regularly as the scholars under their instruction." One letter to the editor of the Dedham Transcript arguing that the Town should pay for such a school said that

When eighty-six young men from one mill, in one section of town... declare their desire to brave the stormy nights of winter, each after a hard day's work that they may attend an irregular evening schoool, it convinces me... that this is a real bone fide desire on their part to devote themselves to improvement, and to become good, intelligent, qualified, citizens.

A Town-funded evening school was established in Mechanic's Hall a few years later but, pay records for the teachers show "suggest that it was very irregular, at best."

=== The Dedham Inn ===
Until the Dedham Inn burned down in 1939, Barbara Thorley taught a kindergarten in the building.

=== Dedham Country Day School ===
Frances L. Faulkner founded The Norfolk School in 1903 as a kindergarten and primary school near the Dedham-Westwood line. Students could attend the school through the 8th grade by 1922. It changed its name to the Dedham Country Day School in 1930 and the cornerstone of the present building was laid on Sandy Valley Road in 1949.

=== Noble and Greenough School ===
Noble and Greenough was founded in 1866 by George Washington Copp Noble, in Boston, Massachusetts, as an all-boys preparatory school for Harvard University. It became known as Noble & Greenough in 1892. In 1922, the school moved from Boston to its current location in Dedham. The property had previously been the estate of Albert W. Nickerson. The grounds were designed by Frederick Law Olmsted. The school discontinued its lower school at this time, which caused parents to start the Dexter School, to fill the gap created. In 1975, Nobles began admitting girls.

=== Rashi School ===
The Rashi School, an independent, Reform Jewish private school was founded in 1986. In 1998, they moved to the St. Mary's Parish School building. They moved to Newton in 2000, but opened a permanent campus in 2010. The school in on a wooded site on the banks of the Charles River, within Newbridge on the Charles Campus for Hebrew Senior Life.

=== British International School of Boston ===
In September 2000, the British International School of Boston opened in the St. Mary's Parish School building. Just 10 days after it opened, the headmistress was killed by a drunk driver. In 4 years the enrollment jumped from 25 to 250 students, and the school moved to a location in Jamaica Plain.

== Higher education ==
The Society of African Mission's American Province was established in 1941 amidst significant growth in vocations. In 1945, the society had acquired land in Dedham, Massachusetts to hold a new minor seminary, a location chosen because of its proximity to Boston, which had a large Catholic population.

Queen of Apostles Seminary was incorporated on 26 December 1945 by the SMA's inaugural US provincial superior Ignatius Lissner and opened in 1946 to educate and train college-age SMA seminarians. Fr. James McConnell, SMA, was the seminary's first president, and Fr. Michael Moran, SMA, initially served as treasurer and clerk.

The seminary closed in the early 1960s and was used to house an art collection owned by the Society, which still maintained a priest residence across the street. In the late 1980s, the building was purchased by Northeastern University and has served ever since as the university's Dedham satellite campus. The Northeastern Huskies field hockey and track and field teams compete at a sports complex on the site.

== Works cited ==
- Austin, Walter (1912). Tale of a Dedham tavern: history of the Norfolk hotel, Dedham, Massachusetts. Riverside Press.
- Byrne, William; Leahy, W. A.; Dowling, Austin; Young, E. J. A.; Finen, J. E. (1899). Introductory. The Hurd & Everts co. pp. 323–324.
- Clarke, Wm. Horatio (1903). Mid-Century Memories of Dedham. Dedham Historical Society.
- Hanson, Robert Brand (1976). Dedham, Massachusetts, 1635-1890. Dedham Historical Society.
- Hurd, Duane Hamilton (1884). History of Norfolk County, Massachusetts: With Biographical Sketches of Many of Its Pioneers and Prominent Men. J. W. Lewis & Company.
- Lockridge, Kenneth (1985). A New England Town. New York: W.W. Norton & Company. ISBN 978-0-393-95459-3.
- Neiswander, Judith (2024). Mother Brook and the Mills of East Dedham. Damianos Publishing. ISBN 978-1-941573-66-2.
- Parr, James L. (2009). Dedham: Historic and Heroic Tales From Shiretown. The History Press. ISBN 978-1-59629-750-0.
- Slafter, Carlos (1905). A Record of Education: The Schools and Teachers of Dedham, Massachusetts 1644-1904. Dedham Transcript Press. "1642-3."
- Smith, Frank (1936). A History of Dedham, Massachusetts. Transcript Press, Incorporated.
