= Dedham Public Schools =

School district in Massachusetts, US

Dedham Public School System

Location
- 100 Whiting Avenue, Dedham Massachusetts United States

District information
- Grades: PK–12
- Established: 1644; 382 years ago
- Superintendent: Nan Murphy
- Asst. superintendent(s): Ian Kelly
- Schools: 7
- Budget: $35,979,808 (FY17)
- NCES District ID: 2504050

Students and staff
- Students: 2,687 (2018-19)
- Teachers: 230.30 (on FTE basis)
- Student–teacher ratio: 11.67:1

Other information
- Website: www.dedham.k12.ma.us

The Dedham Public School System (Dedham Public Schools) is a PK–12 graded school district in Dedham, Massachusetts. It is the oldest public school system in the United States.

== History ==
On January 2, 1643, the town meeting set aside land for three public purposes: a school, a church, and a training field. Two years later, on January 1, 1645, by unanimous vote, the Town of Dedham authorized the first taxpayer-funded public school in the United States, "the seed of American education." It is believed the success of Dedham's school helped convince the Great and General Court to enact a law mandating schools in every community. Dedham's delegates to that body also served on the local School Committee.

The early residents of Dedham were so committed to education that they donated £4.6.6 to Harvard College during its first eight years of existence, a sum greater than many other towns, including Cambridge itself. By the later part of the 17th century, however, a sentiment of anti-intellectualism had pervaded the town. Residents were content to allow the minister to be the local intellectual and did not establish a grammar school as required by law. As a result, the town was called into court in 1675 and then again in 1691.

School was held year round, with students attending from 7 a.m. to 5 p.m. in the summer and 8 a.m. to 4 p.m. in the winter. Initially held in the village center, the school began travelling around town as families moved to outlying areas. From 1717 to 1756, school was held in different parts of town according to population and taxation. In 1762, for example, it was held in the village for 166 days, in South Dedham for 79 days, in Clapboard Trees, for 69 days, and in the West Precinct for 52 days. When in the outer precincts, classes were often held in private homes, but in some parts of Dedham residents privately built schoolhouses. One such school, in Springfield, was built by residents before that part of town had even organized as a parish. In addition, both boys and girls attended dame schools.

The grammar schools prepared students to attend the Latin school which, in turn, prepared students to attend Harvard College. Harvard was established in 1636, the same year Dedham was, and the town supported the university generously in its early years.

In early days, boys were expected to rule their own paper, make their own rulers, frame their own slates, and older boys took turns building a fire one hour before class began. Many made their own ink, pewter ink stands, or quill pens. Girls took turns dusting and sweeping the room and furniture.

Many schools were built in the years following 1897, and were adorned through purchase and donation with a number of works of art. In 1896, the Avery School began running a program to teach illiterate adults how to read. There was also in the 1840s a Lyceum that put on plays in addition to the usual public education programs.

=== First public school ===
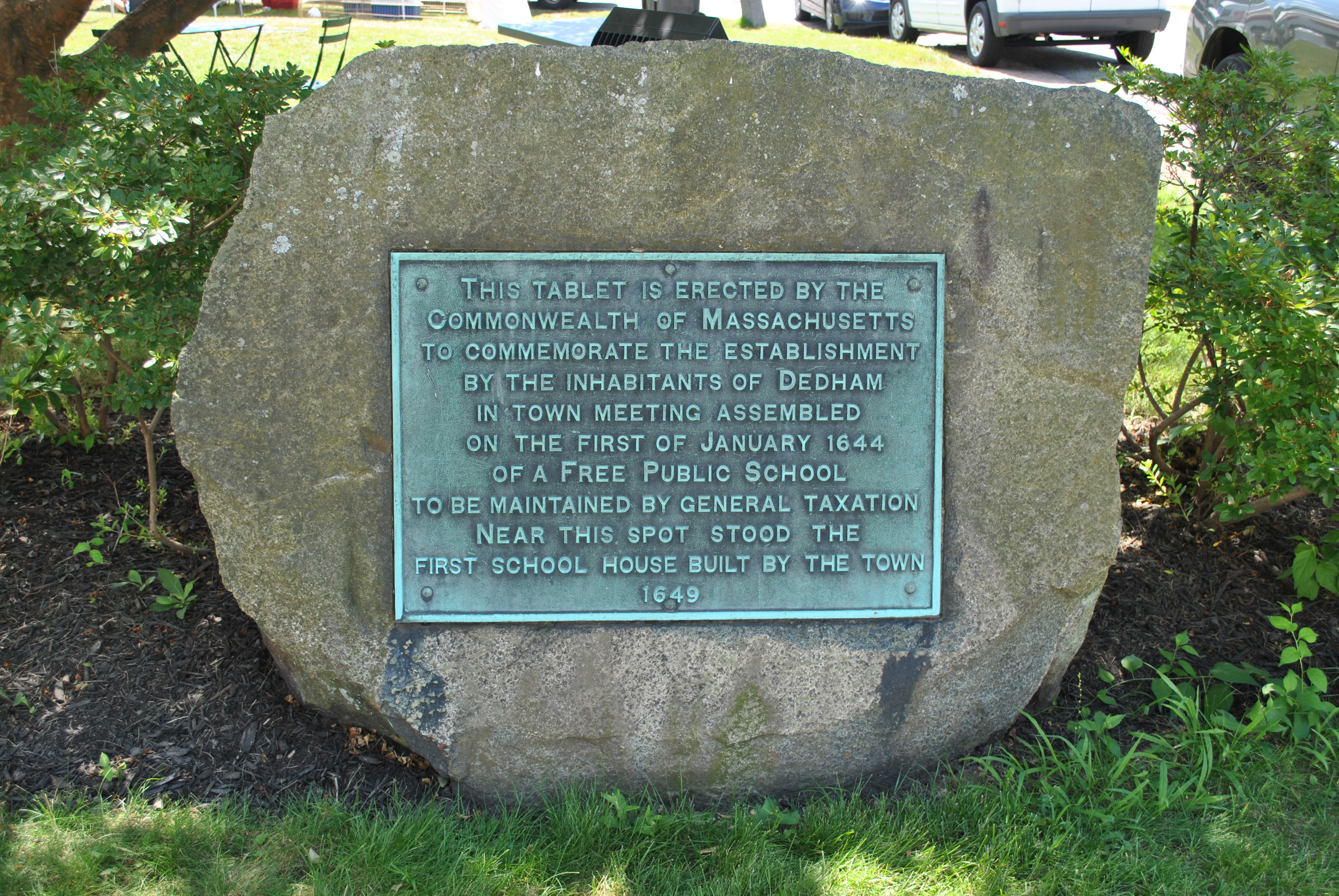
Stone plaque marking the site of the first American public school located on First Church Green in Dedham, Massachusetts

Other schools, including Boston Latin School and the Town of Rehoboth have claimed to be the first public school, but Dedham's was the first to be supported exclusively by tax dollars. On June 25, 1894, the Great and General Court passed a Resolve to erect a monument commemorating the site of the first public school. Lt. Governor Roger Wolcott led a committee that heard the claims of several cities and towns, including the presentation made by Dedham's Don Gleason Hill and Rev. Carlos Slafter.

Wolcott's committee presented Dedham's claims to Governor Frederic T. Greenhalge and the Governor's Council. The governor and council, in accordance with the law, then confirmed that Dedham's was the first. On June 17, 1898, a monument was unveiled on the grounds of the First Church Green, near the site of the original schoolhouse. Hill gave an address in which he noted the school stood in proximity to several important religious, civil, and historical buildings and monuments.

=== First schoolhouse ===
The first classes were likely in the meetinghouse. The first schoolhouse was built in present-day Dedham Square near the First Church and Parish in Dedham by Thomas Thurston at a cost of £11 3 pence. Approved at a town meeting in January 1648–9, it measured 15' by 18' with two windows and a fireplace. Each boy was responsible for providing his share of firewood during the colder months. The building likely resembled contemporary schools in the English countryside with a raised platform, wooden wainscoting, and high windows. The teacher's desk would look like a pulpit and students would sit on plank seats.

The schoolhouse also included a watchtower at one end to prevent Indian attack. Placing the school next to the church was deliberate and symbolized the need for both academic and moral instruction. It stood for nearly 50 years, although in 1661 school was kept in the house of the teacher, Francis Chickering.

=== Curriculum ===
==== 1600s and 1700s ====
Early students studied reading, writing, and arithmetic, and as much Latin as the teacher could manage. In the arithmetic book used, one or two problems were shown as examples under each rule, and the teachers provided the rest. There were no problems for students to solve. Reading was taught using the English primer and then a Psalter.

Spelling was not taught at first, but eventually the "Youth's Instructor in the English Tongue" was used. In addition to spelling, it also touched upon penmanship, reading, arithmetic, business forms, and bills of exchange. Eventually, spelling contests became a popular winter entertainment for students. In 1784, the schools began teaching geography. A special penmanship teacher, John L. Howard, was hired in 1904.

Girls were taught to read and write, as well as sewing, but they did not study math as they had no need for it. Needlework, including patchwork, samplers, and embroidery, were taught as early as 1780.

==== 1800s ====
In the early 1800s, students would be marched from the schoolhouse to the First Church and Parish in Dedham every six weeks on Thursday. There they would listen to the Rev. Joshua Bates's preparatory lecture in advance of Sunday's Lord's Supper. On the Monday following, Bates would visit the school to quiz students on the catechism. Semiannually, students would spend a half day reciting the catechism. Those with the best recitations were awarded small pamphlets with marble covers.

John Wilson taught an evening writing course for adults in the mid-1800s. Children attended school in those days from 9 a.m. to 12 p.m. and then again from 2 p.m. to 5 .m. Each winter, the schools would hold a sleighing party for the children, led by Alden Bartlett's "Naiad Queen" which featured a high dasher on which was painted a mermaid. (Note: Bartlett lived at the corner of Washington and High streets.) It was followed by Sanford Carroll's party sleigh, and then others. Students would occasionally go on field trips to exhibitions in Boston, at Temperance Hall, or at the Town House.

The first sewing teacher, hired at the Avery School in 1868, was Jane S. Small. It expanded to other schools, was discontinued for a time, and resumed in 1888 under the tutelage of Mary Elizabeth Cormerais.

Asa Fitz, an itinerant music teacher, visited the Dedham schools once or twice a year in the mid-1800s. Fitz taught primary school students by rote exercise and taught popular melodies to older students, but did not teach any of them to read music. From 1873 to 1879, Charles Edward Whiting was hired to teach music two days a week. Maria T. Delano taught music in the high school from 1873 to 1884. From 1884 to 1898 it was taught by Arthur Wilder Thayer.

After the Commonwealth mandated that drawing be taught in 1870, Henry Hitchens was hired to teach Dedham's teachers how to instruct in the art form. In 1877, May Flagg Taft, Hitchen's future wife, was hired as a drawing teacher in the high school. She was replaced in 1887 by Anna Rebecca (née Bullard) Slafter who previously taught in the village school.

For seven weeks in the summer of 1891, the schools ran a sloyd program at the old high school building on Highland Street. It was so successful that it was instituted as part of the regular curriculum in 1893. When Annie G. Spencer was hired to teach the Manual Training course, Dedham became the first town in Norfolk County to teach an industrial training program. William Ware Locke took over in 1898.

A program of physical education was introduced in 1893 when Olive F. Moakler began teaching the Ling System of gymnastics.

==== 1900s ====
Marion Spaulding began teaching Domestic Science in 1909. The chemistry lab was especially outfitted with a gas stove and cooking utensils for the class. The following year, Alfred C. Cobb began teaching woodworking, including mechanical drawing, bench work, lathe work, and pattern making.

A stamp saving program was instituted in 1901. Margaret Warren and Emily Ames visited the Avery and Quincy Schools once a week for several years. Students would deposit with them a sum of money and receive a stamp indicating the value in return. When their deposits totaled $3 the money was deposited into a savings account and a savings book was issued to students. In 1902, 237 students saved $331. A state law passed in 1911 explicitly allowed schools to do this and a program was set up with the Dedham Institution for Savings. The bank would later set up a branch for students that was open during lunch hours in the high school cafeteria.

Jessie M. Moulton was hired as the school nurse on January 1, 1912, and conducted 5,684 examinations in her first year.

=== School farm and kindergartens ===
On March 16, 1695, Dedham and several other towns established a 300-acre School Farm in what is today Wellesley, Massachusetts, near Wellesley College. It did not prove to be profitable, and so it was sold on March 13, 1699, for 50 pounds.

A kindergarten supported by private subscription was established at the Ames School in 1893 and ran until 1896. In that year the town appropriated money for kindergartens at the Ames, Avery, and Oakdale Schools, but they did not last long.

=== Establishment of a high school ===
As early as 1827 the Commonwealth of Massachusetts required all towns with more than 500 families to establish a free public high school. Beginning in 1844 the School Committee repeatedly began recommending that the town establish a high school. It wasn't until 1850 when, under threat of a lawsuit, that the town meeting voted to "instruct the Town's School Committee to hire a building and teacher, and establish a High School according to law." A sum of $3,000 was appropriated to support it.

=== Teachers ===
The first teacher, Rev. Ralph Wheelock, was paid 20 pounds annually to instruct the youth of the community. Descendants of these students would become presidents of Dartmouth College, Yale University, and Harvard University.

Michael Metcalf was hired as a teacher in 1656 at the age of 70 and John Swinerton was hired in 1663. Joshua Fisher and Thomas Battle also taught during the early years of the school. Battle, Metcalf, and Fisher were all farmers who stepped in to teach when a professional teacher could not be found. As they had their own farms to manage in addition, their pay was not docked unless they missed an entire week's worth of classes. Until he left to minister to the people of the new community of Wrentham in 1671, Rev. Samuel Man also served as teacher.

Sir Joseph Belcher, the son of Rev. Joseph Belcher, was the first teacher to travel to the various precincts to hold classes. In 1766, Manasseh Cutler, a future congressman and "father of Ohio University," began teaching.

Charles J. Capen started a private school in 1849 and then became the first high school teacher when it was established the following year.

=== School Committee and administration ===
The school was originally controlled by the town meeting but, in 1652, it was put under the control of the Selectmen. In 1789, as the town was split into districts, a school committee was formed. Clergymen were elected to oversee the schools. In the mid-1800s, the school committee consisted of Rev. Alvan Lamson, Rev. Samuel Babcock, and Rev. Calvin Durfee. While living in Dedham, Horace Mann served on the School Committee.

In 1880, the growth of the schools required that a professional superintendent of schools be hired to oversee them. I. Freeman Hall, who had previously taught in Quincy, was hired. His successors through 1936 include Abner J. Phipps, Henry E. Crocker, Guy Channel, Oscar S. Williams, Roderick W. Hine, (Note: According to Smith, "most of the improvements in the curriculum of the Dedham Schools were made during the superintendency of Mr. Hine.") and John C. Anthony.

From 1956 to 2004, the administration's offices were housed in the "White House" originally built by Charles and Mary Shaw at the corner of East Street and Whiting Avenue. In 2004 they moved to the B-wing of Dedham High School as the house was razed to make room for the new Dedham Middle School.

=== Finances ===
The teacher's salary was paid by taxes. For every boy between the ages of four and 14, a tax of between three-and-a-half to five shillings was assessed, depending on how far from the school the family lived. Families who lived more than 2.5 miles from the meetinghouse were exempt from the tax until their children started attending. This covered between 25% and 50% of the total cost, with the rest made up by a tax on the estates of the entire population. In the years following the passage of the Old Deluder Satan Law, Dedham was occasionally fined for not spending enough money of its school but, for the most part, the appropriations to the school were generous.

The schoolmaster's salary was initially set at £20 and was raised in 1695 to £25. As there was little specie in the colony at the time, salaries were instead paid in wheat and corn. Michael Metcalf, for example, received five pounds of each crop at every six months. Not until 1696 did teachers receive actual money for their labor. While the salary was not high, teachers earned a great deal of respect. Records show that teachers were given the honorary title of "sir" at a time when most men were not even referred to as "mister."

The first donation to the school was made by Dr. Henry Deengaine of Roxbury. His deathbed will, taken verbally by John Eliot and approved by Governor John Winthrop, left £3 to the school. In 1680, Dr. William Avery gave £60, and the Honorable Samuel Dexter left $170 in his will. Dexter requested that his bequest, along with several other sums previously donated for the school but were used to hire soldiers instead, be returned to the school. The town agreed to the terms but this fund, along with other school funds, subsequently disappeared. A fund established by Deacon Nathaniel Kingsbury in 1749 had a corpus of £100, the interest of which was to be used for the schools.

On January 1, 1744–5, school trust funds had a balance of £236, 2s, 8d. By 1749–50, the account had £345, 8s, which was loaned out to 12 men in sums between £5 and £100.

=== Districts ===
With the town growing and multiple schoolhouses being built, the school was essentially split into districts in 1756. The districts were not established by law, however, until 1789. As early as 1848, Rev. Dr. Alvan Lamson of the First Church and Parish in Dedham was making the argument that the districts should be abolished and Horace Mann said that the law allowing districts was "beyond comparison, the most pernicious law ever pass in the Commonwealth on the subject of schools." The districts were discontinued in 1866 when the Town purchased all 11 buildings for a total of $49,180 and returned their value to the taxpayers of the respective districts.

== Students ==
In 2024, students in the Dedham Public Schools spoke 36 different languages.

=== Enrollment by school ===
Enrollment by School (2012–13)
	PK	K	1	2	3	4	5	6	7	8	9	10	11	12	Total
Dedham High School	-	-	-	-	-	-	-	-	-	-	180	172	210	203	765
Dedham Middle School	-	-	-	-	-	-	-	227	190	225	-	-	-	-	642
Avery School	-	-	57	52	44	51	45	-	-	-	-	-	-	-	249
Greenlodge School	-	-	51	61	57	71	76	-	-	-	-	-	-	-	316
Oakdale School	-	-	60	54	70	69	65	-	-	-	-	-	-	-	318
Riverdale School	-	-	40	33	40	40	45	-	-	-	-	-	-	-	198
Early Childhood Center	113	225	-	-	-	-	-	-	-	-	-	-	-	-	338
District	113	225	208	200	211	231	231	227	190	225	180	172	210	203	2,826

Enrollment by School (2014–15)
	PK	K	1	2	3	4	5	6	7	8	9	10	11	12	Total
Dedham High School	-	-	-	-	-	-	-	-	-	-	165	180	184	171	700
Dedham Middle School	-	-	-	-	-	-	-	230	233	217	-	-	-	-	680
Avery School	-	-	70	77	56	66	43	-	-	-	-	-	-	-	312
Greenlodge School	-	-	70	65	55	55	60	-	-	-	-	-	-	-	305
Oakdale School	-	-	49	60	59	54	64	-	-	-	-	-	-	-	286
Riverdale School	-	-	46	35	34	35	37	-	-	-	-	-	-	-	187
Early Childhood Center	109	194	-	-	-	-	-	-	-	-	-	-	-	-	306
District	109	194	238	237	204	210	204	230	233	217	165	180	184	171	2,776

== Schools ==
The district operates seven schools. The Early Childhood Education Center serves students in pre-school and kindergarten. There are four neighborhood elementary schools: Avery, Greenlodge, Oakdale, and Riverdale. All four elementary schools feed into Dedham Middle School which houses grades six, seven, and eight, and Dedham High School serves students in grades nine through 12.

=== Dr. Thomas J. Curran Early Childhood Education Center ===
The Dr. Thomas J. Curran Early Childhood Education Center (ECEC) is located at 1100 High Street and serves children in pre-school and kindergarten. The current principal is Kristen Cannon.

Ground was broken on October 23, 2017, for the new ECEC at the former site of the Dexter Elementary School. It was the first pre-school in the state to receive funding from the Massachusetts School Building Authority. The school, which has 51,000 square feet, cost nearly $30 million. A ribbon cutting for the new school took place on April 29, 2019.

=== Avery School ===
The current Avery School, located at 336 High Street, was opened in 2012 and serves children from East Dedham and some from Oakdale. The principal is Jacqueline Mendonsa.

==== History ====
On May 17, 1784, the Avery School was established as the Mill School. The residents of Mill Village (Note: Mill Village is known today as East Dedham.) had asked to be set apart from the schools of the town and for the taxes they paid for schools to instead be directed to a new school in their community. Students in Mill Village were attending eight weeks of school annually by 1807 or 1808. It was later known as Mill Village School, the Grove School, and then District Number 3. It was named in 1867 in honor of Dr. William Avery who had left £60 in 1680 to benefit a Latin School.

The vast majority of employees who worked in the mills along Mother Brook were children under 16. Newspaper ads specifically sought families with multiple children or children alone to come and work in the mills. The school only had daytime instruction, leaving those children who worked during the day no opportunity for evening classes.

The Commonwealth of Massachusetts mandated that every child under the age of 15 attend school for three out of the preceding 12 months before they could be employed in 1836. In 1852, a new law was passed requiring every child between the ages of eight and 14 to attend school for at least 12 weeks. This law was regularly ignored by mill owners. As it was incumbent on parents to send their children, officials were likely unwilling to penalize the impoverished parents who chose to send their children to work instead of class.

By the 1860s, the summer session lasted for 20 weeks, but when large numbers of children began being hired, the neighborhood school was shut down. In 1872, it was estimated that there were over 150 children who were not receiving an education in East Dedham. One resident believed that "this, in a town within ten miles of the Hub of the Universe, is, to say the least, scandalous."

Previous principals include Doris Howard, (Note: Howard's daughter, Ethel Howard Lincoln, wrote the screenplay for a 1920 film that was filmed in Dedham.) Clare Sullivan, and Edward Paris.

==== Buildings ====
The first school building was on Walnut Street, across the street from the home of Dr. F. L. Babcock. A new school was built in 1825 on High Street. At that time, there were 30 students. Another school was constructed in 1844 at what is today 123 High Street. (Note: Thomas Barrows was on the building committee.) In 1894, the town purchased additional contiguous land to expand the lot. A new school was constructed in 1921 for $200,000. Today, that building houses the Mother Brook Arts and Community Center.

=== Greenlodge School ===
The Greenlodge School, located at 191 Greenlodge St, was opened in the 1950s and serves children from the Greenlodge and Manor neighborhoods. The principal is Jenny McGowan.

=== Oakdale School ===
The Oakdale School, located at 147 Cedar St, was opened in 1902 and serves children from Oakdale. It was first opened in 1873 in a rented room in Sanderson Hall in Oakdale Square. A new school was then built across the street in what is today Oakdale Common in 1878. The current school was built in 1902, but the old school was used to relieve overcrowding until the addition was built in 1952. It was named for its neighborhood, having previously been a forest of largely oak trees known as Whiting's Woods.

The original block of the 1902 school building was designed by the Boston architectural firm of Hartwell and Richardson in the Queen Anne style popular between 1880 and 1910. Hartwell & Richardson were also responsible for the design of the former Dedham Institution for Savings building at 601-603 High Street in Dedham, along with many other significant institutional and residential commissions throughout the region.

=== Riverdale School ===
The Riverdale School, located at 143 Needham St, was opened in the 1922 and serves children from Riverdale and Upper Dedham. The principal is Edward Paris. The first Riverdale School was built in 1885 at the corner of Needham and Pine Streets. The windows in the one-room schoolhouse were nearly six feet off the ground, and it accommodated 26 students. Julia Kennedy was the first teacher. It was named for the nearby Riverdale estate of Albert W. Nickerson, which is today Noble and Greenough School.

=== Dedham Middle School ===
The Dedham Middle School, located at 70 Whiting Avenue, was opened in 2007. Karen Hillman is principal and George Benzie is the vice principal. Dedham Public Schools is a 1:1 district, where every student is issued a school-owned Google Chromebook. Previously the middle school was housed in a since demolished building next door.

=== Dedham High School ===
Dedham High School was founded in 1851 and in 2013 earned a silver medal from U.S. News & World Report, one of only 30 schools in Massachusetts to do so. James Forrest is Principal.

In recent years the school has seen tremendous growth in both the number of students taking Advanced Placement courses and in qualifying scores on the exams. The schools athletic program offers 26 varsity sports with a mascot known as the Marauders, and 26 co-curricular clubs and activities. Each student also receives a Google Chromebook from the school.

== Teachers ==
Teachers in the Dedham Public Schools include:

- Francis Chickering
- Caleb Ellis
- Samuel Man
- Horace Mann
- Michael Metcalf
- Alexander Wheelock Thayer
- Ralph Wheelock

== School Committee ==
Notable School Committee members include:

- Rev. Alvan Lamson
- Rev. Samuel Babcock
- Rev. Calvin Durfee.
- Horace Mann
- Royal O. Storrs
- Robert K. Coughlin

== Closed schools ==
There are a number of schools that have closed within the current borders of the Town of Dedham: the Ames School, the Quincy School, the Dexter School, the Burgess School, and the Endicott School.

=== Ames School ===
The Ames School grew out of the first school established in 1644. The first building, referenced in early records as simply "the school near the meetinghouse" eventually came to be known as the First Middle School, District District Number One, the Town School, and the Centre School. New school buildings followed in the coming centuries, with one built in 1695, (Note: This school was built in the same location.) 1754–5, (Note: This school was built in the same location. Austin has the year as 1753.) 1801, (Note: This two story school, built of brick, was taken by the First Church and Parish in Dedham in 1821, a decision that was upheld by the Supreme Judicial Court, and torn down in 1825.) 1822, (Note: This school was built on the northwestern side of School Street, near the intersection with Court St. In 1837 it was "raised and a stay put under it." The school and land were sold after the 1858-9 school was built. John Wilson taught in this school until 1857. His classroom was eventually divided in half and Rebecca Bullard began teaching in the new classroom. A Miss Evelyth also taught in the school until her untimely death.) 1858–9, and 1894–5.

As the number of pupils grew, the 1822 school room was divided in half to make an additional classroom. When that became insufficient, the cigar manufactory next door was purchased and turned into a primary school. The original school had a bell that would call students in from recess. After it closed as a school, Enos Foord converted the building into a double tenement which stood until at least 1903. The 1859 school was built on Washington St. After it closed, it was converted into a residence that was owned in 1936 by Ralph Eaton, the principal of Dedham High School from 1919 to 1953.

The 1859 building was built on the same site as the 1898 building. The first two floors had four classrooms each. Each class was designed for 50 pupils. The third floor of the French-roofed building had a large hall.

The current Colonial Revival structure was built in 1897. On June 17, 1898, it was named in honor of Fisher Ames. (Note: Slafter has the 1859 building being named for Ames.) It is a large H-shaped building, with a central section flanked by symmetrical projecting bays on either side. It has a hip roof with a deep dentillated eave, and pilastered corners. The main entrance is set under broad arch at the center, with a Palladian window above. In 1937, it was painted and renovated by the Works Progress Administration. The Ames School building was closed and sold in the 1980s. The building was listed on the National Register of Historic Places in 1983.

At the 2014 Spring Annual Town Meeting, the Town of Dedham voted to repurchase the building for $5.85 million and renovate it to be used as a Town Hall and Senior Center.

==== Teachers ====
John Wilson taught in the center village grammar school in 1849. (Note: Wilson lived on Ames Street and sang in the choir at the First Church and Parish in Dedham.) Wilson was known to smack children with a rattan to keep order in the classroom. When he left in 1857, he was replaced by Rev. George Newcomb, a Methodist minister. (Note: Newcomb lived on School Street.) Newcomb was replaced by Oliver Bryant, who previously taught at the Avery School. When Bryant switched schools, he moved into Newcomb's home. Bryant left for a job at the Chauncy Hall School in Boston.

Sophia Foord taught in the school in 1833.

In the mid-1800s, the school was visited by Moses Grant Jr. and Charles Spear.

=== Burgess School ===
The Burgess Schoolhouse, also known as District Number 11 and the Westfield School District, was located on Westfield Street near Schoolmaster Lane. The simple one story building had red shutters and plank seats with no backs. A new schoolhouse, named in honor of Rev. Ebenezer Burgess, was built around 1840 and sold 1899.

=== Dexter School ===
The Dexter School in Upper Dedham for many years was leased out to private companies and The Education Collaborative. It was named in 1867 in honor of Rev. Samuel Dexter, a minister at the First Church and Parish in Dedham and a leading citizen of the town. In 2019, a new Early Childhood Education Center was opened in a new building on that site.

=== Endicott School ===
The East Street School, also known as District Number 5, was renamed the Endicott School in honor of John Endicott in 1867. In 1955, the Town sold the land for $1 to St. Luke's Lutheran Church.

=== Quincy School ===
==== First Building ====
The Quincy School was built in to accommodate the new German residents of East Dedham who were settling in the area. The Avery School was already in the neighborhood, but it was becoming overcrowded. The May 1872 Town Meeting appropriated funds to build a two-room schoolhouse for 60 children ages five to 10. In the 1880s, it had to be expanded to four rooms. The lot had been purchased from the German Quincy Homestead Association on July 6, 1872, for $750. The school was named in honor of Boston Mayor Josiah Quincy who was the trustee of the Homestead Association.

==== Second building ====
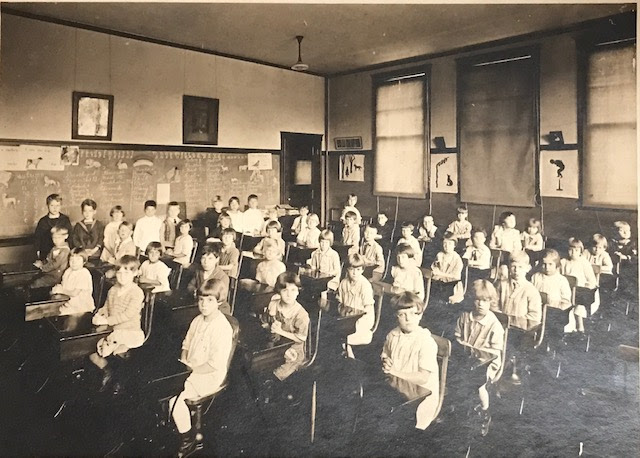
Jenny McManus' first grade classroom at the Quincy School in 1926.

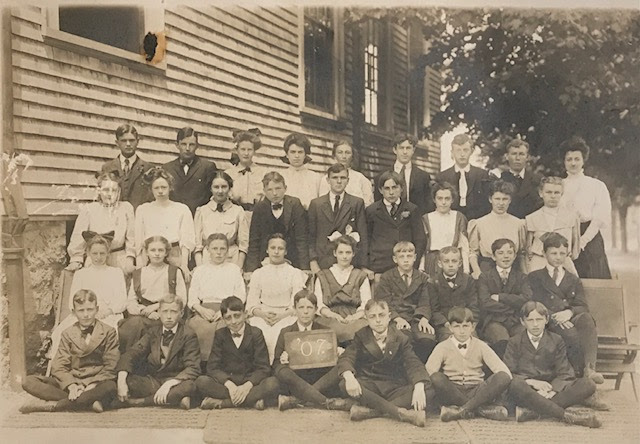
Students in the Quincy School class of 1907

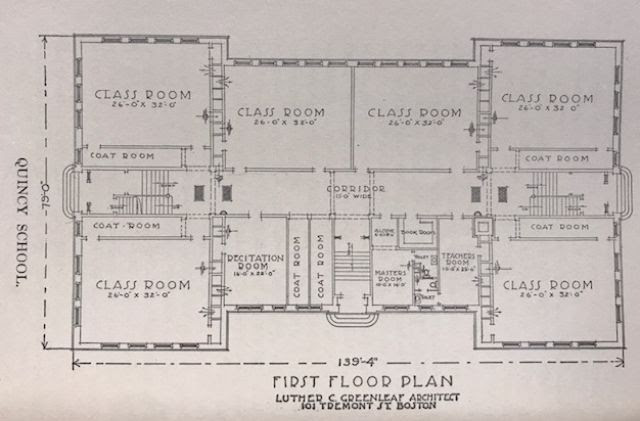
Floor plan of the Quincy School

In April 1909, Town Meeting voted to appropriate $60,000 to build a new school and $6,000 for furnishings, fittings, and grading. The original school, it was said at the time was "only held together by the last coat of paint [and had] clearly outlived its usefulness."

The new school was completed on budget and built at the intersection of Greenhood, Quincy, and Bussey Streets. It was dedicated on June 4, 1910. Within the two-story building were ten rooms. It measured 79' by 140' and was made of brick with sandstone trimming. The interior was outfitted with hard pine.

The first floor had six classrooms, each 26 by 32 feet. It also had a recitation room, measuring 16 x 22 feet, a master's office, and the teacher's room. The second floor had four classrooms and an assembly hall that could seat 500. The basement housed the boiler and coal rooms, a manual training room, a domestic science room, and boys' and girls' play rooms. Every classroom included a coatroom. The architect was Luther C. Greenleaf of Boston.

The new school was used until 1982 when declining enrollment and Proposition 2½ forced its closure. Town Meeting authorized the sale of the property to a developer in 1982, but only after off-duty police officers and firefighters were able to find and bring enough Town Representatives to reach a quorum.

=== Non-Dedham schools ===
There were a number of schools built on land that was once in Dedham, but have since become other communities. They include the Damon School, named for Deacon Samuel Damon who left $1,000 to the Town of Dedham. The income of the fund was to be used to support the worthy poor. The school, which is now in Hyde Park, was named for him in 1867 and was previously known as the Low Plain School, the Readville School, and District Number Four.

The Colburn School, now in Westwood, was named for Warren and Dana P. Colburn who both attended the school. They authored a book on arithmetic. Prior to being named for them in March 1867, it was known as the Clapboardtrees School, the West Dedham School and District Number Eight. Also in Westwood is the Fisher School, named in honor of Daniel Fisher, the colonial Speaker of the Massachusetts House of Deputies, and Ebenezer Fisher, a 19th-century representative to the Great and General Court. The latter Fisher gave $1,000 to benefit the schools of West Dedham. It previously was known as the Clapboardtrees School and District Number Nine. The Islington School was named for the neighborhood in which it resided.

In Norwood, there are competing histories for the naming of the Everett School. Slafter credits it to Edward Everett, who died two years before its naming in 1867 and whose family came from South Dedham. Fanning claims it was for Israel Everett, a Revolutionary War veteran and in whose honor it was named in December 1851. Previously it was known as the South Dedham School, the North District School, District Number Six, and the North District of the Second Parish School. The Balch School was named in honor of Rev. Thomas Balch, a Colonial minister in South Dedham in 1867. A new school was built on the same site in 1913 and is also known as the Balch School.

In Walpole, the Union School taught pupils from Dedham, Walpole, and Medfield. It was built in 1867 and was gone prior to 1905. It was also known as the Walpole Corner School and District Number Ten.

== Associated organizations ==
The Dedham High School Alumni Association keeps graduates of the High School connected to the school and supports the current students and teachers.

The Dedham Education Foundation distributes funds from their endowment to award grants to teachers for or classroom activities or other teacher initiatives and ideas. These include including storytellers, authors-in-residence, art enrichment, literacy and reading programs, social skills programs, and other multi-cultural programs. The Foundation has funded field trips such as Museum of Science, Plimoth Plantation, and The Blue Hills Trailside Museum. Funds have been provided for student performances including live theater productions, drama club, and both the middle and high school choruses. Also, Science Museum presentations and learning kits have been made available through Foundation funding.

The Dedham Educational Partnership works to strengthen the home and school partnership by providing e-mail newsletters for each of the schools' Parent-Teacher Organizations.

== See also ==
- History of education in Dedham, Massachusetts

== Works cited ==
- Austin, Walter (1912). Tale of a Dedham Tavern: History of the Norfolk Hotel, Dedham, Massachusetts. Priv. print. at the Riverside Press.
- Clarke, Wm. Horatio (1903). Mid-Century Memories of Dedham. Dedham Historical Society.
- Dedham Historical Society (August 11, 2001). Images of America: Dedham. Arcadia. ISBN 9780738509440.
- Fanning, Patricia J. (October 16, 2002). Norwood: A History. Arcadia Publishing. ISBN 978-1-4396-3055-6.
- Parr, James L. (2009). Dedham: Historic and Heroic Tales From Shiretown. The History Press. ISBN 978-1-59629-750-0.
- Slafter, Carlos (1905). A Record of Education: The Schools and Teachers of Dedham, Massachusetts 1644-1904. Dedham Transcript Press. "1642-3."
- Smith, Frank (1936). A History of Dedham, Massachusetts. Transcript Press, Incorporated.
- Hanson, Robert Brand (1976). Dedham, Massachusetts, 1635-1890. Dedham Historical Society.
- Neiswander, Judith (2024). Mother Brook and the Mills of East Dedham. Damianos Publishing. ISBN 978-1-941573-66-2.
