= Joshua Fisher (Massachusetts politician) =

American colonial politician

Lieutenant Joshua Fisher (c. 1620-August 10, 1672) was a politician from Dedham, Massachusetts and a member of the Massachusetts House of Deputies. He was a blacksmith, saw mill owner, and tavern keeper.

== Personal life ==
Fisher was born c. 1620 and baptized in April 1621 at Syleham.

He came to New England with his uncle, Anthony Fisher, and cousin Daniel Fisher when he was 16 years old. He traveled a year ahead of his father, and Dedham accepted him on November 1, 1637, on the condition that his father arrive the next summer. Soon after he signed the Dedham Covenant. He became a freeman on May 2, 1649. His father, also named Joshua, and his brother, John, left Dedham and moved to Medfield, Massachusetts by 1664.

In 1639, he joined the First Church and Parish in Dedham. He married Mary Aldis, the daughter of Nathan Aldis, in 1643. After her death in 1653, he married Lydia Oliver, a widow from Boston in 1654. He had four sons and five daughters. One son, also named Joshua, was involved in Dedham's contested Selectmen's election of 1704.

In Dedham, he once disagreed with a decision of the Town of Dedham to build a road over his land and, in accordance with the practice of the town, sent the issue to mediation. In 1656–1657, his estate was valued at £216.10s. This was up from 1651, when his homestead was appraised at £40.36s.

He died in Dedham on August 10, 1672. His estate was valued at £1,145.06.05. He left his widow one third of all his land, or a pension of £10 a year. The rest went to his surviving children.

He had nine children, all born in Dedham: Mary, Joshua, Hannah (born 1647), Abigail, Joshua, John, Hannah (born 1653), Vigilance, and James.

== Public service ==
In 1640, Fisher joined the Ancient and Honorable Artillery Company of Massachusetts, becoming a second sergeant in 1648. In October 1648, the town petitioned the Great and General Court to appoint Fisher a Lieutenant and Eleazer Lusher a captain in the town's trainband. He would thenceforth be known throughout the colony as Lieutenant Fisher.

Fisher served in the Great and General Court of Massachusetts as a representative from Dedham for nine years between 1653 and 1672. Being elected to the post showed the great esteem in which the people of Dedham held Fisher as it was the one body the townsmen recognized as superior to their own town meeting.

In colonial Massachusetts, each town sent two deputies to the General Court each year. Fisher was one of ten men who served in the role from the time of the town's founding in 1636 to 1686 and, after 1650 was one of three, including Eleazer Lusher and Daniel Fisher, who "virtually monopolized the post." In 1671, he and Daniel were among a small minority of the General Court who voted against giving doctrinal authority to clergy.

He was also town clerk for a total of four years, having first been elected in 1657. (Note: Bedini has it as 1656.) He was made a selectman on November 23, 1656. He would serve in that role for a total of 21 years. (Note: Bedini has it as 22 years.)

In 1660, he was sent by the town with several others to purchase the land that became the Town of Wrentham from the native peoples who lived there.

== Career ==
=== Surveyor ===
On January 7, 1649 – 1650, Fisher was charged by town meeting with surveying the town and drawing a map that showed the various property lines. Following this appointment, he is regularly appointed as the town's surveyor. Following the colony's assignment to Dedham of 8,000 acres at Pocumptuck, Fisher, Ensign John Euerard, and Jonathan Danforth were appointed to survey the grant. While engaged in this effort, he became the first in the region to use a compass while surveying.

He drew the line between Sudbury and Watertown, Massachusetts in 1650 and also the line between Dedham and Dorchester in 1670. Dorchester hired him to draw a map of their town in 1661 and then again in 1670. Also in 1670, he ran the line from "Blue Hill to Plymouth."

Fisher surveyed the border of Massachusetts and Plymouth Colony. In 1664 and then again in 1670. He also appointed with several other to lay out the town of Mendon, Massachusetts. After the town of Natick was set off from Dedham, Fisher surveyed that new community.

Fisher laid out the property of Mr. ALcock and Mr. Bradstreet, and settled a dispute between Mr. Z. Gold and Governor John Endecott. He also laid out Endecott's farm on the Ipswich River.

=== Tavern ===
After Michael Powell left Dedham for Boston in 1649, it left the town without a tavern keeper. Fisher then opened Fisher's Tavern in what is present day Dedham Square, on Bullard Street, near "the keye where the first settlers' landed." This public house featured the "Great Room" with a large fieldstone fireplace. In the summer, the room was filled with asparagus, smoke tree, and green shrubs. On the high desk, next to the quill pens, was the tavern's account book.

Fisher brewed his own malt liquor and had a tap room at his house and a drinking room at the brew house. Given the distance from Boston, the General Court agreed on May 9, 1649, to free Dedham from the tax levied on wine. They also granted Fisher the right to serve "strong waters." Should anyone get drunk at his establishment, though, he would be fined 10 shillings. A colony law also required him to close down during the time church services were held.

His tavern was passed down through his son, Joshua, to his grandson, also named Joshua. From there it passed to his son-in-law, Nathaniel Ames.

=== Land ===
Fisher was granted eight acres (3.2 ha) of land in 1642, which was the standard amount Dedham gave to single men. He also received a lot of six acres (2.4 ha), and then another lot the following year. On March 7, 1652 – 1653, when the town divided 500 acres (200 ha), he received 15 acres (6.1 ha).

The colony granted him 300 acres (120 ha) upon the Medfield line in return for services performed but sold it to Nicholas Wood. He had previous received another grant of either 900 or 500 acres (360 or 200 ha) to the west, but sold it to Edmund and William Sheffield. He once purchased land from William Avery. In 1662, he leased some meadows in Dorchester.

=== Other ===
When he first arrived in Dedham, Fisher worked as a blacksmith. Fisher and Lusher owned a saw mill on the Neponset River that is depicted on the seal of the Town of Walpole, Massachusetts. They were granted permission to open it on March 4, 1658 – 1659.

Fisher agreed to shingle the meetinghouse on January 17, 1651-2 and to have it done by June 24, 1652, in return for £15 but was ultimately paid £20.

In 1652, Nathanial Whiting sold his mill on Mother Brook and all his town rights to Fisher, John Dwight, Francis Chickering, and John Morse for 250 pounds, but purchased it back the following year.

== Works cited ==
- Lockridge, Kenneth (1985). A New England Town. New York: W.W. Norton & Company. ISBN 978-0-393-95459-3.
- Worthington, Erastus (1827). The history of Dedham: from the beginning of its settlement, in September 1635, to May 1827. Dutton and Wentworth. p. 29.
- Hanson, Robert Brand (1976). Dedham, Massachusetts, 1635-1890. Dedham Historical Society.
- The Fisher Genealogy: A Record of the Descendants of Joshua, Anthony, and Cornelius Fisher, of Dedham, Mass., 1630-1640. Massachusetts Publishing Company. 1898. ISBN 978-0-608-32125-7.
- Worthington, Erastus (1900). Historical sketch of Mother Brook, Dedham, Mass: compiled from various records and papers, showing the diversion of a portion of the Charles River into the Neponset River and the manufactures on the stream, from 1639 to 1900. Dedham, MA: C.G. Wheeler.
- Fisher, Phillip A. (1898). The Fisher Genealogy: A Record of the Descendants of Joshua, Anthony, and Cornelius Fisher, of Dedham, Mass., 1630-1640. Massachusetts Publishing Company. ISBN 978-0-608-32125-7.
