= Moses Grant Jr. =

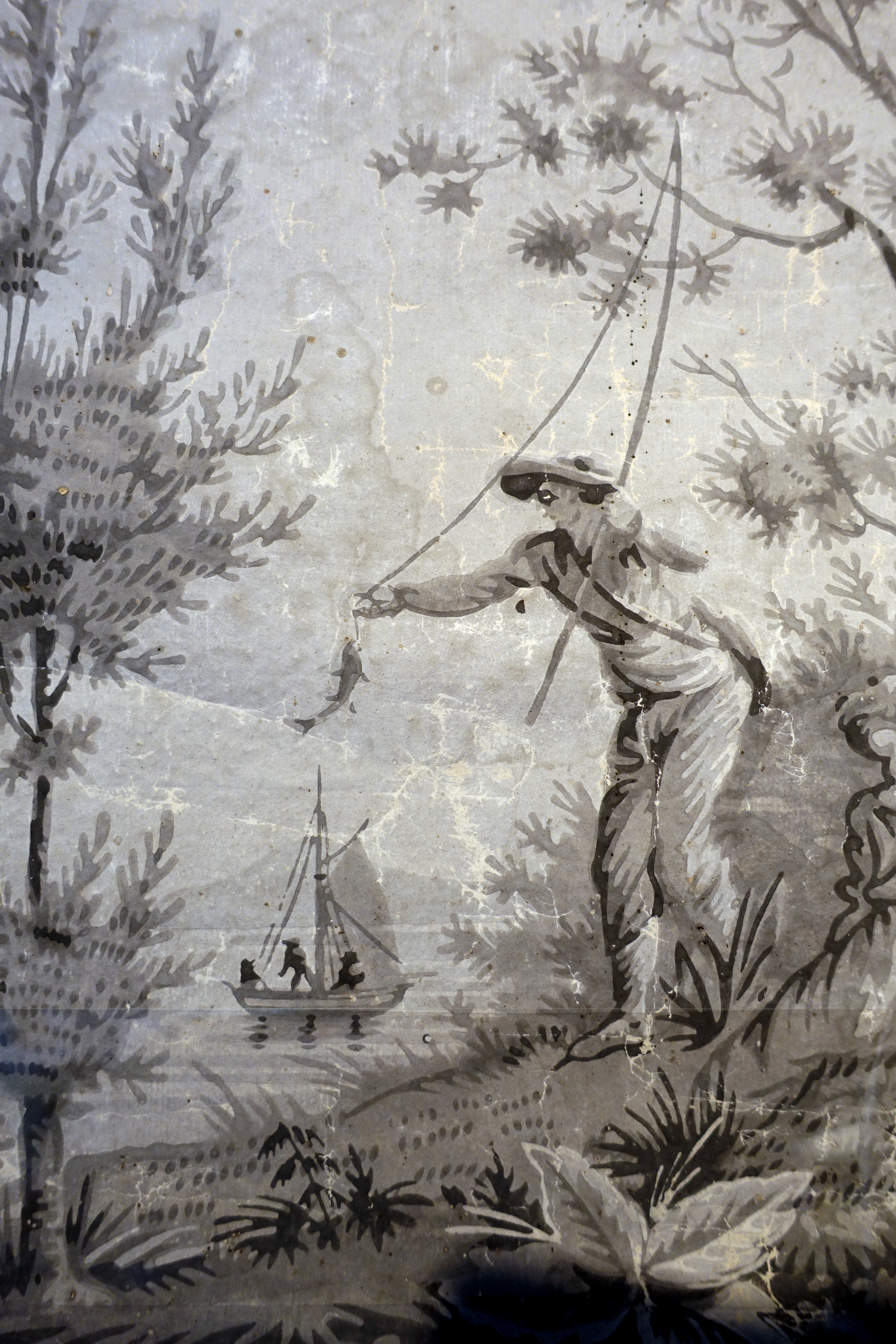
Wallpaper fragment by Moses Grant Jr., & Co., Boston, 1811-1817

Moses Grant Jr. (July 25, 1785 - July 22, 1861) was a businessman born in Boston, Massachusetts, where he inherited his father's successful wallpaper business, selling English, French, American, and Cantonese wallpapers. He was a founder of the Massachusetts Bible Society, a Deacon at the Brattle Street Church, and President of the Boston Temperance Society.

He would frequently visit the Centre School in Dedham. He had charge of the Farm School on Thompson Island.

== Works cited ==
- Global Trade and Visual Arts in Federal New England, Patricia Johnston, Caroline Frank, University of New Hampshire Press, page 171, Nov 4, 2014.
- Massachusetts Bible Society biography
- Boston Public Library archives
