= John Kingsbury =

New England settler (died 1660)

John Kingsbury (died September 12, 1660) was an early resident of Watertown, Massachusetts and a founder of Dedham, Massachusetts. He represented Dedham in the Great and General Court in 1647.

== Public service ==
Kingsbury was admitted as a freeman in Watertown on March 3, 1635/6 and settled in Dedham in 1636. He was one of the 12 men who petitioned the General Court to incorporate Dedham as a separate town, though they asked for it to be called Contentment.

He held various town offices in Dedham, including pound keeper. Kingsbury was a town proprietor and was elected to the very first board of selectmen in 1639. He served as selectman for 12 years in total. Kingsbury also signed the Dedham Covenant. He was appointed by the Massachusetts Bay Colony to end small causes.

After selecting John Allin as pastor of the First Church and Parish in Dedham, Kingsbury's name was put forth with those of Ralph Wheelock, John Hunting, and Thomas Carter, to be ruling elder, with Hunting eventually being selected. Some of the land he owned is in what is today Needham, Massachusetts

== Personal life ==
Kingsbury was born in Boxford, Suffolk to John Kingsbury and traveled to Massachusetts with his older brother and sister-in-law in the early 1630s. He had a wife, Margarett.

Kingsbury had a brother, Joseph, also of Dedham.

== Works cited ==
- Worthington, Erastus (1827). The history of Dedham: from the beginning of its settlement, in September 1635, to May 1827. Dutton and Wentworth.
- Smith, Frank (1936). A History of Dedham, Massachusetts. Transcript Press, Incorporated.
- Lockridge, Kenneth (1985). A New England Town. New York: W.W. Norton & Company. ISBN 978-0-393-95459-3.
- Kingsbury, Frederick John (1905). The Genealogy of the Descendants of Henry Kingsbury, of Ipswich and Haverhill, Mass. Hartford Press. p. 82.
