= George Barbour (politician) =

Massachusetts politician

George Barbour (1615 – 1685) represented Medfield, Massachusetts in the Great and General Court of Massachusetts. He was a signer of the Dedham Covenant.

== Works cited ==
- Hill, Don Gleason, ed. (1892). The Early Records of the Town of Dedham, Massachusetts. 1636–1659. Vol. 3. Dedham Transcript.
