= Robert Hinsdale =

Colonial American Puritan cleric (1617–1675)

Robert Hinsdale (died September 18, 1675) was a founder of Dedham, Medfield, and Deerfield, Massachusetts who died in the Battle of Bloody Brook.

== Early and personal life ==
Coat of Arms of Robert Hinsdale

He was born in England, likely in Essex, and was a parishioner of Rev. John Rogers. He emigrated to Dedham, Massachusetts, becoming a proprietor of that town in 1637.

Hinsdale married as his first wife, probably in England, Ann Woodward, the daughter of Peter Woodward of Dedham. (Note: Hinsdale and Peter Woodward both served on the Dedham Board of Selectmen.) With her he had six sons and two daughters: Elizabeth, Barnabas, Samuel, Gamaliel, Mary, (Note: Mary married Daniel Weld.) Experience, John, and Ephraim. Ann was a sensitive and timid woman and she fainted when asked to make a public profession of her faith to join the First Church and Parish in Dedham on June 2, 1639. She died June 4, 1666.

Hinsdale married for a second time around 1668 to Elizabeth Hawks, the widow of John Hawks of Hadley. (Note: On June 25, 1683, after Hinsdale's death, Elizabeth married Thomas Dibble of Windsor, Connecticut. She died September 25, 1689.) They had no children. Elizabeth was a woman of different mold from Ann. The union did not prove a happy one and they soon parted. At court on March 30, 1674, they were charged with living separately and with "lascivious and wanton carrage." Elizabeth refused to answer the charges and appears to have gotten off clear. The court found Hinsdale guilty, however, and ordered him whipped ten stripes on the naked body. The court also imposed a fine for which his sons became responsible and which the court refused to remit after his death.

The inventory of Robert Hinsdale's estate was taken October 22, 1676. His son Ephraim was surety for Elizabeth, his step mother.

== Dedham ==
Early Dedham records show Hinsdale was a faithful attendant on town meetings and he appears to have been a valuable and public spirited member of the community. He was elected a member of the very first Board of Selectmen on July 18, 1637 and was reelected on May 17, 1639, December 31, 1639, and January 1, 1645. On March 13, 1639, he was admitted freeman of Massachusetts Colony.

He was one of the eight founders of the First Church and Parish in Dedham on November 8, 1638. It took months of discussions before a church covenant could be agreed upon and drafted. The group established thirteen principles, written in a question and answer format, that established the doctrine of the church. With the doctrinal base was agreed upon, 10 men, including Hinsdale, were selected to seek out the "living stones" upon which the congregation would be based. The group began to meet separately and, one by one, they would leave the room so that the others could elect or reject them. They decided that Hinsdale and five others, John Allen, Ralph Wheelock, John Luson, John Fray, and Eleazer Lusher were suitable to form the church. He has been described as a "pillar of the church" in Dedham.

On January 1, 1645, he was part of a unanimous vote to establish the first public school in the United States, what has become the Dedham Public Schools. They agreed to raise the sum of twenty pounds per annum in support of the school. In 1645, he was chosen a member of the Ancient and Honorable Artillery Company of Massachusetts, the oldest military organization in this country.

== Medfield ==
On November 14, 1649, he was appointed one of a committee of Dedham citizens to organize a new town which afterwards came to be Medfield, Massachusetts. He was one of those who negotiated a payment of £50, payable by the Medfield settlers to the Dedham proprietors, for the rights to all the lands in Medfield.

He was among the first thirteen who took up houselots at Medfield and his homestead there was on what is now North Street in 1652. Soon after the town granted him 46 acres of land near what was later known as Collin's Mill. He started his life n Medfield as he left it in Dedham, as a respected and prosperous member of the community.

Hinsdale was chosen one of its first Selectmen and served six years in that capacity. He was active in organizing the first Medfield church. In 1659, he purchased a bell and brought it up for the use of the town.

Hinsdale had a series of unfortunate events in Medfield, however. He built a mill there, but it was burned by Indians in 1676. On August 20, 1663, he and his wife Ann conveyed his 90-acre farm in Medfield to Jeremiah Tauke, a citizen and clothworker of London, as payment for a £153 debt. He had mortgaged all his other land in Medfield in 1656 and eventually turned it over to Samuel Shrimpton, a wealth merchant.

== Deerfield ==
About 1667, he removed with his family to the Connecticut Valley, settling first at Hadley, Massachusetts. It was there in 1672 when he was released from military duty on account of age and a sore leg. He was an original proprietor in the 8,000 acre grant given to the Dedham people at Deerfield. Being a remote outpost, the settlement was vulnerable to attack.

He drew lot 31 in 1671, the site of the Willard House in the early 1900s. He and his four sons were inhabitants of Deerfield by November 13, 1673 and he began clearing his land for agriculture. Samuel was actually the first colonial settler of the land, having begun squatting there around 1669. All the sons followed their father to Medfield, and then some traveled on to Hadley, Massachusetts or Hatfield, Massachusetts before arriving in Deerfield.

Hinsdale was the deacon of the first church there and one of the principal and most active citizens. He and his son Samuel, Sampson Frary, John Farrington, and Samuel Daniel were the only men of the original 32 Dedham proprietors of Pocumtuck, the native people's name for the area, who became actual settlers of Deerfield. The others sold out their rights.

Hinsdale and his three sons, Samuel, Barnabas, and John, were slain by King Phillip and his men at the Battle of Bloody Brook on September 18, 1675. Eight women of Deerfield were made widows that day, including the four wives of Robert and his three oldest sons.

== Works cited ==
- Lockridge, Kenneth (1985). A New England Town. New York: W.W. Norton & Company. ISBN 978-0-393-95459-3.
- Smith, Frank (1936). A History of Dedham, Massachusetts. Transcript Press, Incorporated.
- Worthington, Erastus (1827). The history of Dedham: from the beginning of its settlement, in September 1635, to May 1827. Dutton and Wentworth. p. 29.
- Hanson, Robert Brand (1976). Dedham, Massachusetts, 1635-1890. Dedham Historical Society.
