= John Dwight (died 1661) =

New England settler (1601-1661)

John Dwight (c. 1601–1661) was one of the first settlers of Dedham, Massachusetts and progenitor of the Dwight family.

== Personal life ==
Coat of Arms of John Dwight

Dwight was born in Woolverstone, England circa 1601 and came to Massachusetts in 1635. He originally settled in Watertown, Massachusetts before becoming one of the original incorporators of Dedham, Massachusetts the following year. He brought his wife, Hannah, and children, including Timothy Dwight. He was married twice, first to Hannah, with whom he had five children: Hannah, Timothy, John, Mary, and Sarah. Hannah was named for her mother, and Timothy was possibly named for a family member or for their minister, Timothy Dalton. Mary was born while at sea on their way to Massachusetts.

After Hannah died on September 5, 1656, Dwight married Elizabeth Ripley on January 20, 1658. They did not have any children together, and she died on July 17, 1660 by drowning herself. Dwight died January 24, 1661.

As a high ranking family man with strong religious convictions, Dwight was awarded 12 acres of land when he first settled in Dedham, the maximum allowed. As a selectman, he received large grants of land. As was typical of long serving selectmen, Dwight was comparatively well off. He was able to give his son a house and plot of land as a gift and yet still die with an estate valued at £500. He was able to acquire the wealth due his high standing in the community, marked by service to the town and church.

It made him one of the richest men in Dedham. His estate grew to be quite sizable by the time he died, giving his heirs more than they possibly could have imagined had the family remained in England. He passed on both his wealth and prestige to his son Timothy, marking the start of a family that was known for both wealth and prestige.

His brother, Timothy, traveled from England to Dedham shortly after Dwight. He lived in Dedham until 1650 when he became one of the first settlers of Medfield, Massachusetts and built the Dwight-Derby House. When Timothy moved to Medfield, Dwight purchased Timothy's most valuable lands to be able to finance the move.

== Founder of Dedham ==
Dwight was on the very first Board of Selectmen in Dedham. He served for 16 years with his final term ending in January 1653/54. He was "one of the highest ranked men" in the town. Dwight was one of just ten men, or 5% of the population, who made up 60% of the leadership of the town. Though service on the board was not always continuous, with men taking the occasional year or two off, they were always asked to contribute to important projects or committees during those times. He also served as tax surveyor, surveyor of highways, fence viewer for East Street, and in a number of other positions.

Tradition holds that either Dwight or John Rodgers, both signers of the petition seeking the establishment of the town, asked the Great and General Court to name to name the town Dedham—not Contentment, as was originally asked—after their hometown of Dedham, Essex.

== Career ==
Dwight was a part owner of a mill on Mother Brook, the first man made canal in America. In 1642, John Elderkin, who built the mill, sold half of his rights to Nathaniel Whiting and the other half to John Allin, Nathan Aldis, and Dwight. (Note: Allin was the minister, Aldis the deacon, and Dwight was Whiting's father-in-law.) They operated the mill "in a rather stormy partnership" until 1649 when Nathaniel Whiting became the sole owner. The Town was displeased with the "insufficient performance" of the mill under Whiting's management. In 1652, Whiting sold his mill and all his town rights to Dwight, Francis Chickering, Joshua Fisher, and John Morse for £250, but purchased it back the following year.

== Works cited ==
- Worthington, Erastus (1827). The history of Dedham: from the beginning of its settlement, in September 1635, to May 1827. Dutton and Wentworth.
- Smith, Frank (1936). A History of Dedham, Massachusetts. Transcript Press, Incorporated.
- Dwight, Benjamin Woodbridge (1874). The History of the Descendants of John Dwight, of Dedham, Mass. J. F. Trow & son, printers and bookbinders.
- Goodwin, Nathaniel (1982). Genealogical Notes Or Contributions to the Family History of Some of the First Settlers of Connecticut and Massachusetts. Genealogical Publishing Com. ISBN 978-0-8063-0159-4.
- Hanson, Robert Brand (1976). Dedham, Massachusetts, 1635-1890. Dedham Historical Society.
- Worthington, Erastus (1900). Historical sketch of Mother Brook, Dedham, Mass: compiled from various records and papers, showing the diversion of a portion of the Charles River into the Neponset River and the manufactures on the stream, from 1639 to 1900. Dedham, MA: C.G. Wheeler.
- Lockridge, Kenneth (1985). A New England Town. New York: W.W. Norton & Company. ISBN 978-0-393-95459-3.
