= John Bacon (Dedham) =

John Bacon (died 1683) was a prominent early settler and selectmen in Dedham, Massachusetts.

The son of Michael Bacon, he was likely born in England and emigrated to Dedham in 1640 with his father. His father had moved to Ireland about seven years before they moved to the Massachusetts Bay Colony. From his father's will, he inherited land in Dorchester and most of Michael's land in Dedham.

He frequently served in a number of positions and on a number of committees, including four years as selectman beginning in 1661. Bacon was one of the signers of the petition of the town of Dedham against the Indians of Natick that was sent to the governor, his council, and General Court on May 7, 1662. Previously, he surveyed and laid out the 2,000 acres that had been granted to the Indians but then revoked.

When a dispute arose about the allotment of land, Bacon signed the petition stating asking for mediation. He ran afoul of local laws in 1671 for attempting to sell some of his land to a non-Dedhamite without permission.

He was a member of Captain Timothy Dwight's company in King Philip's War and was stationed at the garrison in Wrentham in 1676. He married Rebecca Hall on December 17, 1651, and together they had nine children: John, Rebecca, Daniel, Sarah, Samuel, Thomas, Susanna, Mary, and Stephen. He resided in Dedham until his death on June 17, 1683. At the time of his death, he owned 24 cattle, a relatively modest sized herd that was typical of Dedham in that era.

== Works cited ==
- Baldwin, Thomas Williams (1915). Bacon Genealogy: Michael Bacon of Dedham, 1640, and His Descendants. Higginson Book Company. ISBN 9780832830112.
- Lockridge, Kenneth (1985). A New England Town. New York: W.W. Norton & Company. ISBN 978-0-393-95459-3.
- Worthington, Erastus (1827). The history of Dedham: from the beginning of its settlement, in September 1635, to May 1827. Dutton and Wentworth.
