= Henry Chickering =

Henry Chickering was an early settler of Dedham, Massachusetts who served in the Great and General Court of Massachusetts and for six years on the Dedham Board of Selectmen.

He may have been the brother of Francis Chickering, with whom he served in the General Court. He was granted land in Salem, Massachusetts in 1640 and was made a freeman in 1641. Chickering was a deacon of the First Church and Parish in Dedham. With his wife, Ann, he had a son, John.

== Works cited ==
- Worthington, Erastus (1827). The history of Dedham: from the beginning of its settlement, in September 1635, to May 1827. Dutton and Wentworth.
