= John Gay (Dedham) =

New England settler (died 1688)

John Gay (died March 4, 1688) was an early settler and selectman in Dedham, Massachusetts.

Coat of Arms of John Gay

Gay emigrated to America with John Winthrop on the Mary and John on May 30, 1630. He settled first in Watertown, Massachusetts and was a grantee in the Great Dividends and in the Beaver Brook plowlands, owning altogether forty acres. He was admitted freeman on May 6, 1635. With his wife, Joanna, (Note: Joanna died August 14, 1691. She is said in family tradition to have been widow Baldwicke before her marriage to John Gay.) he had 11 children.

With others of Watertown, he was one of the founders of the plantation of Dedham, Massachusetts. He was one of those who petitioned for incorporation of the town on September 6, 1636 and signed the Dedham Covenant. He served as selectmen in 1654 and in a variety of other positions, including constable and member of the county grand jury.

In 1661, Gay was the richest man in Dedham. His wealth dwindled in his later years, though, with much of it likely going to his sons, until he was in near poverty at the time of his death. Gay died March 4, 1688. His will in the Suffolk records was dated December 18, 1686 and was proved December 17, 1689. His estate was valued at £91 5s 8d.

== Works cited ==
- Lockridge, Kenneth (1985). A New England Town. New York: W.W. Norton & Company. ISBN 978-0-393-95459-3.
- Worthington, Erastus (1827). The history of Dedham: from the beginning of its settlement, in September 1635, to May 1827. Dutton and Wentworth.
