= Joseph Kingsbury (Dedham) =

New England settler (1600-1676)

Joseph Kingsbury (c. 1600–1676) was an early settler and selectman from Dedham, Massachusetts.

== Personal life ==
Kingsbury was born in Boxford, Suffolk to John Kingsbury. He traveled to Massachusetts in the early 1630s with his younger brother, John Kingsbury, and his wife Millicent, whom he married in Boxford in 1628. He had a daughter, Sarah, born in 1635. Their second daughter, Mary, was the second child ever born in Dedham on September 1, 1637. Their third child, Elizabeth, was born in 1638. Four boys then followed, including Joseph, born 1640, John, born in 1643, Eleazer, born in 1645, and Nathaniel, born in 1650.

== Dedham ==
Kingsbury was one of the ten men who were selected to seek out the "living stones" upon which First Church and Parish in Dedham would be founded. He was found to be "stiff" and "too much addicted to the world," however, and was not selected to be a founding member in 1638. He was later admitted in 1641. Some sources suggest he was displeased with the church after giving the church a valuable plot of land and receiving swamp land in return.

The first portion of the Old Village Cemetery was set apart at the first recorded meeting of the settlers of Dedham on August 18, 1636, with land taken from Kingsbury and Nicholas Phillips. He signed the Dedham Covenant.

He died in 1676.

== Works cited ==
- Kingsbury, Frederick John (1905). The Genealogy of the Descendants of Henry Kingsbury, of Ipswich and Haverhill, Mass. Hartford Press. p. 82.
- Smith, Frank (1936). A History of Dedham, Massachusetts. Transcript Press, Incorporated.
- Worthington, Erastus (1827). The history of Dedham: from the beginning of its settlement, in September 1635, to May 1827. Dutton and Wentworth. p. 29.
- Lockridge, Kenneth (1985). A New England Town. New York: W.W. Norton & Company. ISBN 978-0-393-95459-3.
