= Fisher School–High Street Historic District =

Historic district in Massachusetts, United States

- U.S. National Register of Historic Places
- U.S. Historic district
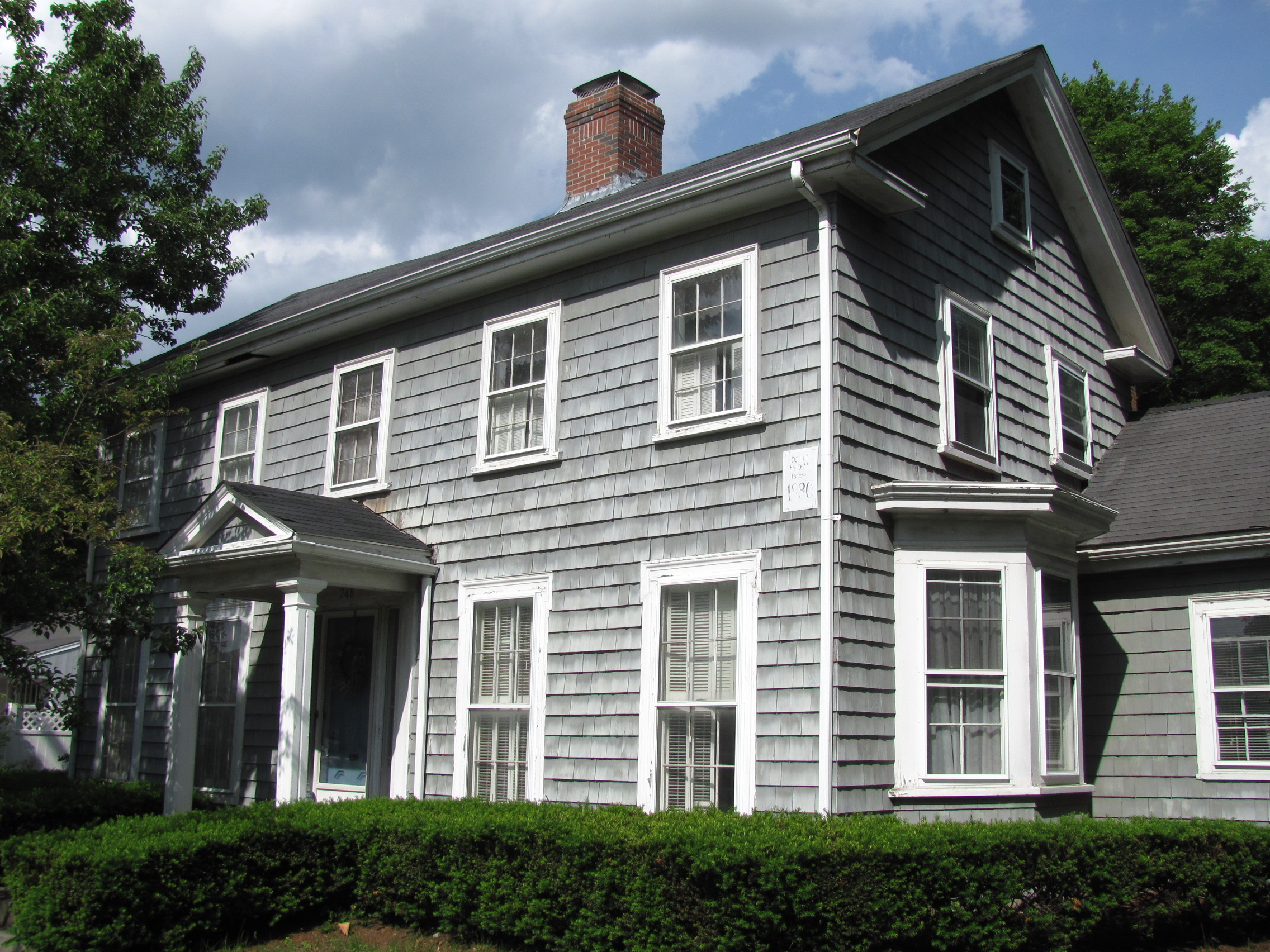
- 748 High Street

- Location within Massachusetts Location within the United States
- Location: Westwood, Massachusetts
- Coordinates: 42°13′24″N 71°13′25″W
- Area: 40 acres (16 ha)
- Built: 1809
- Architectural style: Federal, Greek Revival
- NRHP reference No.: 00000687
- Added to NRHP: June 30, 2000

Fisher School–High Street Historic District is a historic district at 748–850; 751-823 High Street in Westwood, Massachusetts. It includes a relatively short stretch of High Street (Massachusetts Route 109) south of Westwood's commercial heart, extending from just south of its junction with Hartford Street to the cemetery at High and Nahatan Streets. It is distinguished by its concentration of Federal and Greek Revival houses from the early 19th century. Prominent in the district is the First Baptist Church, which was built near its present location in 1809 using timbers from an earlier 1731 meeting house, and the 1845 Greek Revival Fisher School, which has been restored by the Westwood Historical Society. The school was named in honor of Daniel Fisher, the colonial Speaker of the Massachusetts House of Deputies, and Ebenezer Fisher, a 19th-century representative to the Great and General Court. The latter Fisher gave $1,000 to benefit the schools of West Dedham. It previously was known as the Clapboardtrees School and District Number Nine.

The district was listed on the National Register of Historic Places in 2000.

== See also ==
- National Register of Historic Places listings in Norfolk County, Massachusetts

== Works cited ==
- Slafter, Carlos (1905). A Record of Education: The Schools and Teachers of Dedham, Massachusetts 1644-1904. Dedham Transcript Press. "1642-3."
