= Abraham Shaw =

Abraham Shaw (1590–1638) was a colonial American settler, tailor, builder, and miner.

== Personal life ==
With his wife, Bridget, Shaw had three children, including a son, John.

== England ==
Fairbanks lived in West Yorkshire, England, where he worked in coal mines. Jonathan Fairbanks, who would later emigrate to America and live in Dedham with Shaw, was from the same parish. He mined coal in the Hipperholme and Sowerby, Yorkshire areas.

== Massachusetts ==
After moving from England to Massachusetts, Shaw settled in Watertown sometime after June 1636. His house there burned down in 1636, shortly before he moved to Dedham.

Shaw arrived in Dedham, Massachusetts in 1637. The first town meeting held in Dedham was on March 23, 1636/37, with Shaw present. (Note: Others included Edward Alleyn, Abraham Shaw, Samuel Morse, Philemon Dalton, Joseph Shaw, Ezekiel Holliman, Lambert Genery, Nicholas Phillips, Ralph Shepheard, John Gaye, Francis Austen, William Bearstow, John Rogers, Daniel Morse, John Huggins, Jonathan Fairbanks and John Dwight.)

He was granted 60 acres (24 ha) of land as long as he erected a watermill, which he intended to build on the Charles River near the present-day Needham Street bridge. (Note: The site was discovered in the 1840s when excavations on the site uncovered the remnants of a millrace.) A condition of the grant was that if Shaw ever sold the mill, the town would have the right of first refusal to purchase it back from him. Shaw died in 1638 before he could complete his mill, however, and his heirs were not interested in building the mill.

Shaw was involved in several communal projects in Dedham, including building a causeway and a bridge and measuring a meadow. Shaw lived on the opposite side of the river from Fairbanks and the other on the committee to build the bridge, but they would need access to his side so they could use his services at the mill he was building.

In November 1637, Shaw received the first grant ever given by the Massachusetts Bay Colony to explore for coal and iron. He died before he could use it, which would have entitled him to "half the benefit of coals or iron stone, which shall be found in any ground which is in the country’s disposing."

== Works cited ==
- Abbott, Katharine M. (1903). Old Paths And Legends Of New England (PDF). New York: The Knickerbocker Press. pp. 290–297.
- Hanson, Robert Brand (1976). Dedham, Massachusetts, 1635-1890. Dedham Historical Society.
- Neiswander, Judith (2024). Mother Brook and the Mills of East Dedham. Damianos Publishing. ISBN 978-1-941573-66-2.
- Worthington, Erastus (1900). Historical sketch of Mother Brook, Dedham, Mass: compiled from various records and papers, showing the diversion of a portion of the Charles River into the Neponset River and the manufactures on the stream, from 1639 to 1900. Dedham, MA: C.G. Wheeler.
