= Henry Wright (Massachusetts politician) =

Henry Wright was an early settler of Dedham, Massachusetts. As a member of the "second generation" of selectmen in Dedham, he served ten terms beginning in 1661.

When land was granted to Dedham settlers in compensation for the land given to Christian Indians in what is today Natick, Massachusetts, Wright's horse was hired to go survey the land.

== Bibliography ==
- Lockridge, Kenneth A.; Kreider, Alan (1966). "The Evolution of Massachusetts Town Government, 1640 to 1740". The William and Mary Quarterly. 23 (4): 549–574. doi:10.2307/1919125. JSTOR 1919125.
- Worthington, Erastus (1827). The history of Dedham: from the beginning of its settlement, in September 1635, to May 1827. Dutton and Wentworth.
