= Francis Chickering =

17th century New England settler

Francis Chickering was an early settler of Dedham, Massachusetts who served in the Great and General Court of Massachusetts and on that town's Board of Selectmen for 15 years. He was also a teacher in the first public school in America, today well known as the Dedham Public Schools.

He arrived in Dedham in 1637 from Suffolk, England with his wife, Ann, and admitted as a freeman in 1640. (Note: Neiswander places his arrival in 1638.) Together they had Elizabeth in 1638, Bethia in 1640, and Mercy in 1648. He was possibly the brother of Henry Chickering, with whom he served in the General Court. He was a member of the Ancient and Honorable Artillery Company.

Chickering was a part owner of a mill on Mother Brook, the first man made canal in America. The Town was displeased with the "insufficient performance" of the mill under Nathaniel Whiting's management and so, in 1652, Whiting sold his mill and all his town rights to John Dwight, Chickering, Joshua Fisher, and John Morse for £250. Whiting purchased it back the following year, however.

Though the schoolhouse was still standing, in 1661 school was kept in Chickering's home. He signed the Dedham Covenant.

He was an ancestor of Jabez Chickering and Hannah B. Chickering.

== Works cited ==
- Worthington, Erastus (1827). The history of Dedham: from the beginning of its settlement, in September 1635, to May 1827. Dutton and Wentworth. p. 29.
- Hanson, Robert Brand (1976). Dedham, Massachusetts, 1635-1890. Dedham Historical Society.
- Smith, Frank (1936). A History of Dedham, Massachusetts. Transcript Press, Incorporated.
- Worthington, Erastus (1900). Historical sketch of Mother Brook, Dedham, Mass: compiled from various records and papers, showing the diversion of a portion of the Charles River into the Neponset River and the manufactures on the stream, from 1639 to 1900. Dedham, MA: C.G. Wheeler.
- Whittemore, Henry (1967). Genealogical Guide to the Early Settlers of America: With a Brief History of Those of the First Generation and References to the Various Local Histories, and Other Sources of Information where Additional Data May be Found. Genealogical Publishing Com. ISBN 978-0-8063-0378-9.
- Neiswander, Judith (2024). Mother Brook and the Mills of East Dedham. Damianos Publishing. ISBN 978-1-941573-66-2.
