= Edward Alleyn (Massachusetts politician) =

Edward Alleyn (died 1642) was a businessman and early American politician. He served on the first board of selectmen in Dedham in 1639 and was a frequent representative to the Great and General Court beginning in 1638. He was town clerk for two years, having first been elected in 1639. As a businessman, he was involved with establishing an iron foundry.

Alleyn was a "pillar of the church" at the First Church and Parish in Dedham. In early records he was given the title of "mister," which typically indicated that he had a university degree. For his service to the community, he was later given the title of "gent."

Although several men initially complained that he had offended them, Alleyn's answers were sufficient to make him a founding member of the church.

He was killed in 1642 in Boston and buried in the Old Village Cemetery. His descendant, Dorothy Alleyne, married Jabez Chickering.

== Works cited ==
- Lockridge, Kenneth (1985). A New England Town. New York: W.W. Norton & Company. ISBN 978-0-393-95459-3.
- Smith, Frank (1936). A History of Dedham, Massachusetts. Transcript Press, Incorporated.
- Worthington, Erastus (1827). The history of Dedham: from the beginning of its settlement, in September 1635, to May 1827. Dutton and Wentworth.
- Cheney, Rev. William Franklin (1927). The Chickering-Alleyne family : a paper before the Dedham Historical Society. Boston: Thomas Todd Co.
