= Timothy Dwight (Massachusetts politician) =

Captain Timothy Dwight
- Born: c. 1629; England
- Died: 31 January 1717 (aged 87–88) [N.S.: 31 January 1718] (Note: During Dwight's lifetime, Britian used the Old Style Julian calendar. By the time of Dwight's death, the difference between the Julian calendar and the New Style Gregorian calendar was excatly a year: thus Dwight died on 31 January 1718 by the Gregorian reckoning, and on 31 January 1717 by the Julian reckoning. Unless otherwise noted, dates in this article follow the Julian calendar with New Year falling on 1 January.); Dedham, Province of Massachusetts Bay, British America
- Burial place: Old Village Cemetery
- Spouses: Sarah Perman (m. 1651; died 1652) Sarah Powell (m. 1653; died 1663) Anna Flynt (m. 1664; died 1685) Mary Edwards (m. 1686; died 1688) Esther Fisher (m. 1689; died 1690) Bethia Morse (m. 1691)
- Children: 14
- Parent: John Dwight (father)
- Relatives: Dwight family; Michael Powell (father-in-law); Daniel Fisher (father-in-law)

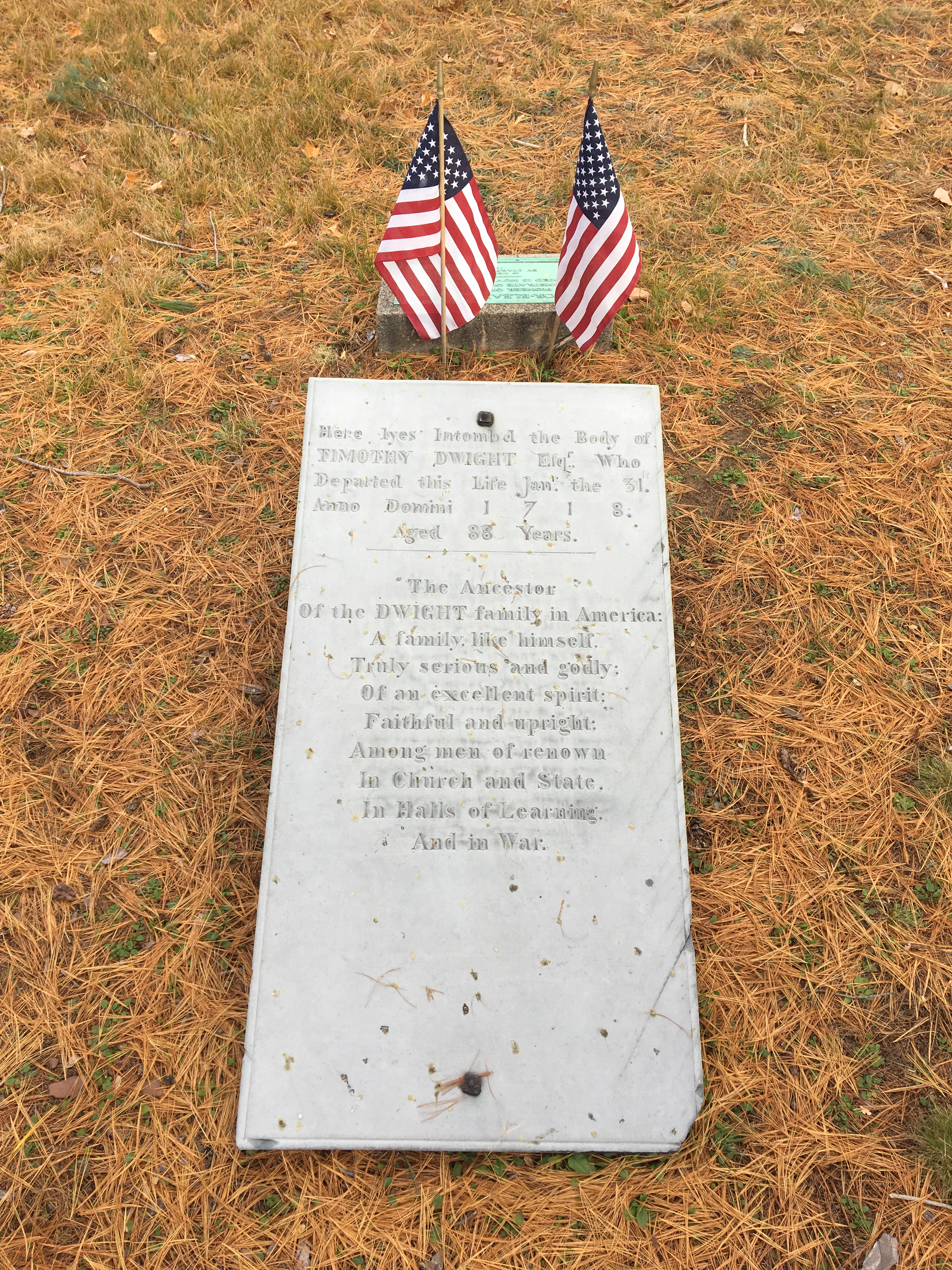
Timothy Dwight's tombstone

Captain Timothy Dwight (c. 1629 – 31 January 1717) represented Dedham in the Great and General Court of Massachusetts and was the progenitor of the Dwight family.

== Personal life ==
Dwight was born in England in 1629 to John and Hannah Dwight née Close and was brought to Dedham, Massachusetts in 1635 as a child. John Dwight was one of the first settlers of Dedham. Timothy was made a freeman in 1655 and was a member of the First Church and Parish in Dedham beginning in 1652.

Dwight was married six times and fathered 14 children.

His first marriage was to Sarah Perman née Sibley, on November 11, 1651. Sarah Sibley Dwight died in childbirth on May 29, 1652.

His second marriage was to Sarah Powell (daughter of Michael Powell (Massachusetts politician), on May 3, 1653. Four children were born to them. Sarah Powell Dwight died on June 27, 1664.

His third marriage was to Anna Flynt (Flint), niece of Leonard Hoar, on January 9, 1664 (January 9, 1665 N.S.). Ten children were born to them, including Justice Nathaniel Dwight, Reverend Josiah Dwight,[6] and Captain Henry Dwight. (See Dwight family). (Note: Flynt was born September 11, 1642. Her maternal uncle was Leonard Hoar, President of Harvard College.)

His fourth marriage was to Mary Edwards née Pooll (Poole), widow of Mathew Edwards, on January 7, 1686 (January 7, 1687 N.S.). They had no children together. Mary Pooll Dwight died August 30, 1688.

His fifth marriage was to Esther Fisher (daughter of Daniel Fisher (Massachusetts politician) on July 31, 1690. They had no children together. Esther Fisher Dwight died on January 30, 1690 (January 30, 1691 N.S.).

His sixth marriage was to Bethia Morse, on February 1, 1691 (February 1, 1692 N.S.). They had no children together. Bethia Morse Dwight died on February 6, 1717 (February 6, 1718 N.S.), just a week after her husband. They were buried together, on the same day, in the family vault.

== Military and Public Service ==
Dwight served in the Great and General Court from 1691 to 1692 and perhaps later. He also served for 10 years as Town Clerk and 25 years as selectman. His public service was praised by Rev. Samuel Dexter, who called him "a man of renown."

Dwight, with Richard Ellis, served as the agent of the Town when negotiating with King Phillip for title to the land today known as Wrentham, Massachusetts in 1660. He was also town clerk for a total of 10 years, having first been elected in 1661. He served 24 terms as selectman, beginning in 1644.

He was a cornet of a cavalry troop as a young man and later served as a captain of foot soldiers. He fought against the native peoples in the area ten times, and either killed or took prisoner nine.

== Death ==
Dwight built the first tomb in the Old Village Cemetery around 1700. In that tomb are laid his body, Eleazer Lusher, William Adams, and his wife, Bethia Dwight. He died on January 31, 1717 (January 31, 1718 N.S.), and was buried on February 7, 1717 (February 7, 1918 N.S.), the same day as his wife, Bethia, who died the day before. His pallbearers included Governor Joseph Dudley and Judge Samuel Sewall.

== Works cited ==
- Smith, Frank (1936). A History of Dedham, Massachusetts. Transcript Press, Incorporated.
- Goodwin, Nathaniel (1982). Genealogical Notes Or Contributions to the Family History of Some of the First Settlers of Connecticut and Massachusetts. Genealogical Publishing Com. ISBN 978-0-8063-0159-4.
- Dwight, Benjamin Woodbridge (1874). The History of the Descendants of John Dwight, of Dedham, Mass. J. F. Trow & son, printers and bookbinders.
- Worthington, Erastus (1827). The history of Dedham: from the beginning of its settlement, in September 1635, to May 1827. Dutton and Wentworth.
- Hanson, Robert Brand (1976). Dedham, Massachusetts, 1635-1890. Dedham Historical Society.
- Filby, P. William (2012). Passenger and Immigration Lists Index, 1500s-1900s. Gale Research.
