= Thomas Metcalf (Massachusetts politician) =

American politician

Thomas Metcalf represented Dedham, Massachusetts in the Great and General Court. He also served 10 terms as selectman, beginning in 1678.

== Works cited ==
- Worthington, Erastus (1827). The History of Dedham: From the Beginning of Its Settlement, in September 1635, to May 1827. Dutton and Wentworth. p. 1.
