= Peter Woodward (politician) =

American politician (died 1685)

Peter Woodward (died May 9, 1685) represented Dedham, Massachusetts in the Great and General Court in 1665, 1669, and 1670. He also served on the board of selectmen for 16 years, with his first term beginning in 1643 and his last ending in 1670.

His daughter, Ann, married Robert Hinsdale, probably in England. He had at least two sons, William and Peter. William, a Harvard College graduate, was hired to assist John Allin in preaching at the First Church and Parish in Dedham in 1668, but died the following June. His brother collected his salary from the church 16 years later.

He died May 9, 1685.

The Town gathered on January 4, 1669, to elect selectmen for the year. At the end of the meeting, Woodward was declared one of the winners. Many supporters of Anthony Fisher alleged fraud, however, and Woodward refused to serve until the question was resolved. The Town met again on January 8, and this time voted by secret ballot. Fisher was elected.

== Works cited ==
- Andrews, Herbert Cornelius; Hinsdale, Sanford Charles (1906). Hinsdale genealogy: descendants of Robert Hinsdale of Dedham, Medfield, Hadley and Deerfield, with an account of the French family of De Hinnisdal (Public domain ed.). A. H. Andrews. p. 208.
- Lockridge, Kenneth (1985). A New England Town. New York: W.W. Norton & Company. ISBN 978-0-393-95459-3.
- Worthington, Erastus (1827). The history of Dedham: from the beginning of its settlement, in September 1635, to May 1827. Dutton and Wentworth.
- Hanson, Robert Brand (1976). Dedham, Massachusetts, 1635-1890. Dedham Historical Society.
