= John Hayward (Massachusetts politician) =

New England settler (died 1672)

Coat of Arms of John Hayward

John Hayward (died 1672) also known as John Haward, represented Dedham, Massachusetts in the Great and General Court in 1645. He served for nine years as a Selectman in Dedham. He was elected to office before he became a member of the First Church and Parish in Dedham.

Previously he lived in Watertown, Massachusetts. Hayward died in 1672 in Charlestown.

== Works cited ==
- Whittemore, Henry (1967). Genealogical Guide to the Early Settlers of America: With a Brief History of Those of the First Generation and References to the Various Local Histories, and Other Sources of Information where Additional Data May be Found. Genealogical Publishing Com. ISBN 978-0-8063-0378-9.
- Worthington, Erastus (1827). The history of Dedham: from the beginning of its settlement, in September 1635, to May 1827. Dutton and Wentworth. p. 29.
