= Daniel Fisher (Massachusetts politician) =

American colonial politician

Ensign Daniel Fisher (1618–1683) was a politician from Dedham, Massachusetts, and Speaker of the Massachusetts House of Deputies.

== Personal life ==
Fisher was baptized in Syleham, Suffolk, England in 1618. He came to Massachusetts with his father, Anthony Fisher, and his cousin Joshua Fisher, aboard the ship Rose. He was married in 1641 in Dedham to Abigail Marrett and together they had seven children. Fisher's father, Anthony, and son, Daniel, also served in the Great and General Court. His son was said to be his "heir to his energetic ardor in the cause of freedom."

He was a member of the First Church and Parish in Dedham. He died in 1683. The Fisher School, now in Westwood, Massachusetts, was named in his honor.

== Public service ==
Fisher served in the Great and General Court of Massachusetts as a representative from Dedham. Being elected to the post showed the great esteem in which the people of Dedham held Fisher as it was the one body the townsmen recognized as superior to their own Town Meeting.

In colonial Massachusetts, each town sent two deputies to the General Court each year. Fisher was one of ten men who served in the role from the time of the Town's founding in 1636 to 1686 and, after 1650 was one of three, including Eleazer Lusher and Joshua Fisher, who "virtually monopolized the post." In 1671, he and Joshua were among a small minority of the General Court who voted against giving doctrinal authority to clergy.

He was elected Speaker of the Massachusetts House of Deputies in 1680 and served in the role for three years. After serving in the House of Deputies, Fisher was elected to the Massachusetts Council of Assistants, a body in rank just below the Governor and Deputy Governor.

Fisher was also elected to serve as a Selectman in Dedham in 1650. In total, he served in this post for 32 years. On May 27, 1647, he gave a parcel of land to the Town for use as an animal pound but reserved the right to cut the trees on it. With his sister, Lydia, he helped to hide the regicides Edward Whalley and William Goffe after they sought asylum in America in 1660.

Fisher and Eleazer Lusher were sent to purchase land from the Pocomtuc Indians who lived in what is today Deerfield, Massachusetts.

== Works cited ==
- Abbott, Katharine M. (1903). Old Paths And Legends Of New England (PDF). New York: The Knickerbocker Press. pp. 290–297.
- Goodwin, Nathaniel (1982). Genealogical Notes Or Contributions to the Family History of Some of the First Settlers of Connecticut and Massachusetts. Genealogical Publishing Com. ISBN 978-0-8063-0159-4.
- Hanson, Robert Brand (1976). Dedham, Massachusetts, 1635-1890. Dedham Historical Society.
- Lockridge, Kenneth (1985). A New England Town. New York: W.W. Norton & Company. ISBN 978-0-393-95459-3.
- Lustig, Mary Lou (2002). The Imperial Executive in America: Sir Edmund Andros, 1637–1714. Fairleigh Dickinson University Press. ISBN 978-0-8386-3936-8. OCLC 470360764.
- Slafter, Carlos (1905). A Record of Education: The Schools and Teachers of Dedham, Massachusetts 1644-1904. Dedham Transcript Press. "1642-3."
- Webb, Stephen Saunders (1998). Lord Churchill's Coup: The Anglo-American Empire and the Glorious Revolution Reconsidered. Syracuse, NY: Syracuse University Press. ISBN 978-0-8156-0558-4. OCLC 39756272.
- Worthington, Erastus (1827). The history of Dedham: from the beginning of its settlement, in September 1635, to May 1827. Dutton and Wentworth.
