= Michael Powell (Massachusetts politician) =

American politician

Michael Powell represented Dedham, Massachusetts in the Great and General Court in 1641 and 1648. His daughter, Sarah, married Timothy Dwight. He was also town clerk for a total of four years, having first been elected in 1643. He was a selectman for four years, beginning in 1641. He was the first tavern owner in Dedham.

Powell later moved to Boston and taught, without being ordained, at Second Church, Boston prior to Increase Mather.

== Works cited ==
- Goodwin, Nathaniel (1982). Genealogical Notes Or Contributions to the Family History of Some of the First Settlers of Connecticut and Massachusetts. Genealogical Publishing Com. ISBN 978-0-8063-0159-4.
- Dwight, Benjamin Woodbridge (1874). The History of the Descendants of John Dwight, of Dedham, Mass. J. F. Trow & son, printers and bookbinders. p. 102.
- Worthington, Erastus (1827). The history of Dedham: from the beginning of its settlement, in September 1635, to May 1827. Dutton and Wentworth. p. 29.
