= Ralph Wheelock =

English Puritan minister, American colonial public official (1600-1683)

The Reverend Ralph Wheelock
- Born: c. 14 May 1600; Donington, Shropshire, England
- Died: 1683; Medfield, Massachusetts Bay Colony, British America
- Education: Clare College, Cambridge, University of Cambridge (BA and MA)
- Occupations: Puritan minister, civil servant, school teacher

Ralph Wheelock (1600–1683) was an English Puritan minister, American colonial public official, and educator. He is known for having been the first public school teacher in America.

== Early life and education ==
Wheelock was most likely born in 1600 in Donington, Shropshire, England.

Wheelock was educated at Clare Hall at the University of Cambridge, where he studied alongside John Milton and John Eliot. He enrolled in 1623, obtained his Bachelor of Arts degree in 1626, and Master of Arts in 1631. He participated in the radical Puritan movement that was then centered at the University of Cambridge.

== Marriage and family ==
Coat of Arms of Ralph Wheelock

On 17 May 1630, in the church of Wramplingham St Peter and St Paul, Wramplingham, England, Wheelock married Rebecca Clarke. The two had three children in England: Mary, baptized in Banham, County of Norfolk, 2 September 1631; Gershom, baptized in the village of Eccles, County of Norfolk, 3 January 1632 (O.S); and Rebecca Wheelock, baptized in Eccles as well, on 24 August 1634.

The family sailed to the Massachusetts Bay Colony in 1636 (O.S), 6 years after the settlement of Boston, and at the peak of the "Great Migration". Ralph's wife, Rebecca, reportedly gave birth to their daughter, Peregrina, on the voyage. He and his family settled in Watertown, Massachusetts upon arrival. After moving to the town of Dedham in the winter of 1636 (O.S.), which Wheelock had a major role in establishing, children Benjamin, Samuel, Record, and Experience were born. The family lived there for over a decade.

In 1651, while retaining the Dedham house for rental income or housing extended family, Wheelock moved his immediate family to Medfield, Massachusetts, which he founded and where he spent the remaining 32 years of his life. Eleazar Wheelock was born to Ralph and Rebecca at Medfield. One of Eleazar's grandchildren, also named Eleazar, would go on to become the founder of Dartmouth College, in Hanover, New Hampshire.

== Career ==
Ralph Wheelock joined the dissenting religious movement known as Puritanism while attending Clare College. On 6 May 1630, he was ordained priest at Peterborough Cathedral by Francis White, Bishop of the Norfolk Diocese. His ordination comes almost four months before the signing of the Cambridge Agreement, where 12 men agreed to the sale of Massachusetts Bay Company shares to those interested in emigrating to the new world. It is probable that Wheelock served clerical duties at the parish in Eccles where his children Gershom and Rebecca were baptized.

Wheelock participated in a plan to create a new settlement further up the Charles River from Watertown, Massachusetts, to be called Contentment (later renamed Dedham). In 1638, Wheelock became one of the earliest settlers and a founder of Dedham. He was granted a tract of land in the west end of town, 1 mile from the meeting and school house. The lot straddles today's Channing Road from Havern Street down to the Charles River. He lived there with his wife for over a decade, and played a leading role in the affairs of the town. In July 1637 (O.S), Wheelock signed the Dedham Covenant, effectively the founding constitution of Dedham. In 1639, he and six others were chosen to be town selectmen. He was also appointed to assist in the surveying the boundaries of the town. He most likely had a hand in the planning of Mother Brook, the first English canal in New England that was started in 1639.

On 13 March 1638/9, Wheelock was declared a freeman. In 1642, he was appointed the clerk of writs at the General Court, which was the central court of the Bay Colony with powers granted by the British Crown. Two years later, in 1645, he was appointed one of the commissioners authorized to "solemnize" marriages, which at the time was a civil rather than religious duty.

Wheelock was one of eight "living stones" that formed the First Church and Parish in Dedham. He served as a Selectman in 1640.

On 1 February 1644 a Dedham town meeting voted for the first free (public) school in Massachusetts, to be supported by town taxes. Ralph Wheelock was the first teacher at this school, and hence the first tax-supported public school teacher in the colonies. Three years later, in 1647, the General Court decreed that every town with 50 or more families must build a school supported by public taxes.

As Dedham became increasingly populous in the late 1640s, it was decided to forge a new township up the Charles River out of a tract of land that was then part of Dedham. Wheelock was appointed leader of this effort, and in 1649 he and six others were given the duties of erecting and governing a new village, to be called New Dedham, later renamed Medfield. Wheelock almost certainly wrote the document called "The Agreement" which, for a time, every new settler of Medfield had to sign. The Agreement stated that the signatories were to abide by the town ordinances and laws, maintain orderly conduct, and resolve differences between themselves peaceably.

The first house lot in Medfield (12 acres) was granted to Ralph Wheelock. The house lot was at the intersection of North and Main streets on the west side of North and extended almost to Upham Road (which used to be called Short Street). His planting field was directly across Main Street from his house lot and ran along Pleasant Street, extending almost to where Oak Street is today. Ralph served on the first Board of Selectmen (1651). He subsequently served on the Board of Selectmen in 1652–1654, and again in 1659. In 1653 he took up a collection for Harvard College. Wheelock held the position of representative to the General Court in Massachusetts for Medfield in the years 1653, 1663, 1664, 1666, and 1667. Ralph Wheelock was the first schoolmaster of the public school in Medfield, which was founded in 1655. He remained schoolmaster for around 8 years.

== Death and legacy ==
Wheelock died 11 January 1683/84, the 84th year of his life. His wife, Rebecca Clarke Wheelock, died on 1 January 1680/1 in Medfield. Both are buried in unmarked graves in the old section of Medfield's Vine Lake Cemetery.

Ralph Wheelock played an active and important role in the settling of the Massachusetts Bay Colony. He was instrumental in establishing two new towns, and held virtually every office of importance in both of them. Furthermore, he was at the forefront of establishing the educational foundations of the country.

His descendants would also prove to play an important a role in settling New England and the rest of America. His son, Benjamin, was a founder of the Town of Mendon, Massachusetts. Among his great-grandchildren were founders of several New England towns, as well as Eleazar Wheelock, the founder of Dartmouth. Succeeding generations would push farther west, settling the frontiers in New York, Connecticut, Michigan, Illinois, Nova Scotia, and Texas, establishing impressive credentials as teachers, writers, soldiers, founders of towns, and creators of business.
