= Baker v. Fales =

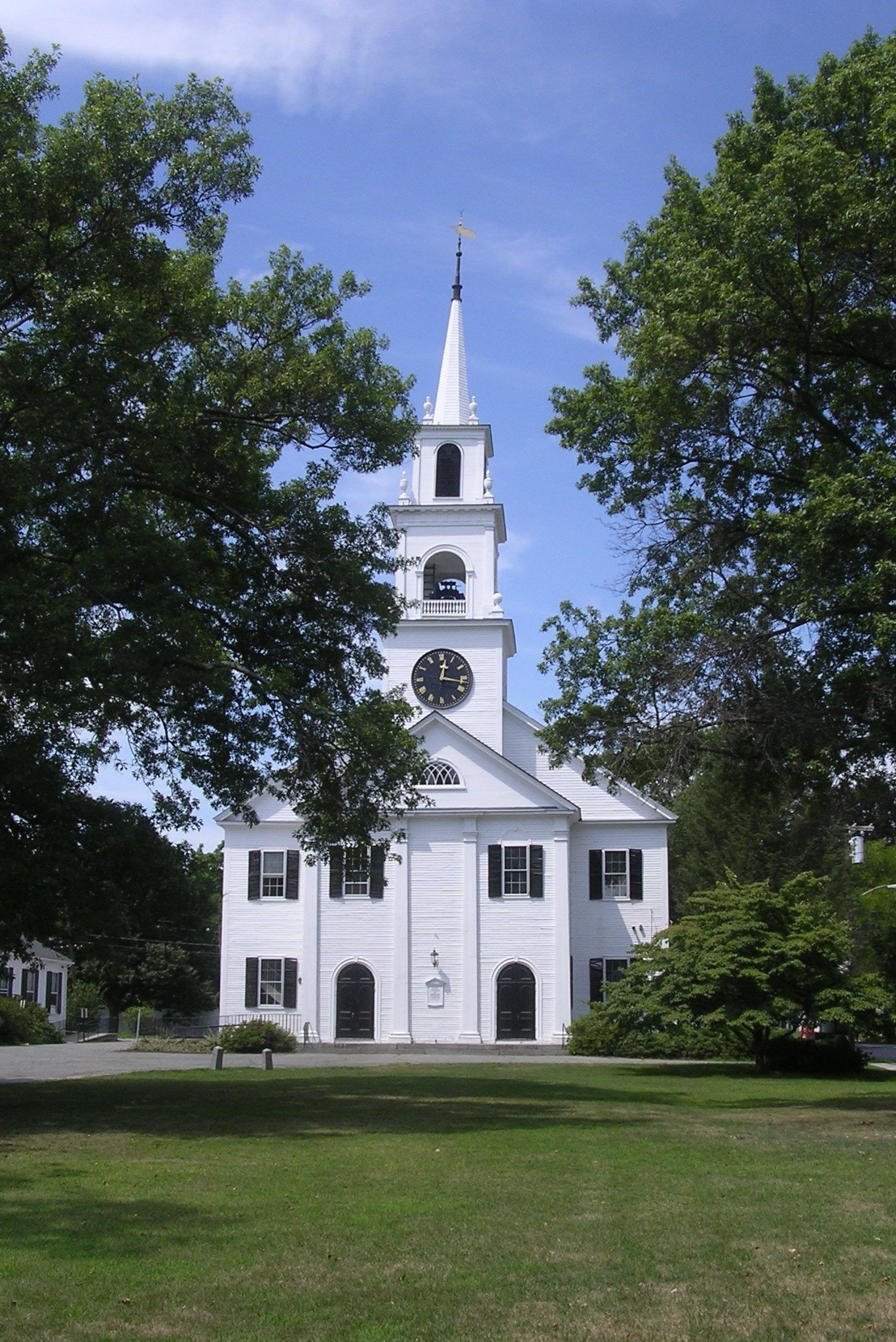
First Church and Parish, Dedham MA

Baker v. Fales, also known as The Dedham Case, was a seminal case of the Massachusetts Supreme Judicial Court. It involved the First Church and Parish in Dedham rejecting the minister the Town of Dedham selected for it and its split into the Allin Congregational Church. It was a major case on the road to the separation of church and state and led to the Commonwealth of Massachusetts formally disestablishing the Congregational Church in 1833.

== Background ==
The preaching of Jonathan Edwards and George Whitefield helped to revive the churches of Dedham during the Great Awakening. The theological debates that arose as a result, however, helped bring about a split in the churches into different denominations.

A distinction was made between the church and the parish. The parish was composed all of the residents of a geographic territory who had not joined another religious group such as the Episcopal Church. The church included only those members of the parish who had been admitted to the church.

In the early 19th century, all Massachusetts towns were constitutionally required to tax their citizens "for the institution of the public worship of God, and for the support and maintenance of public Protestant teachers of piety." All residents of a town were assessed, as members of the parish, whether or not they were also members of the church. The "previous and long standing practice [was to have] the church vote for the minister and the parish sanction this vote," although the method varied over the history of Dedham since the church was first gathered in 1638.

Churches in those days were not corporate bodies or authorized to hold property. A Massachusetts law passed in 1754 made a church's deacons the trustees of all its property.

== Dispute at First Church ==
=== Selection of Alvan Lamson ===
In 1817, Joshua Bates asked to be dismissed from the church so that he could become president of Middlebury College. Due to his differing political beliefs—Bates was a Federalist but the congregation was Democratic Republican by a ratio of 3 to 1—and his politically tinged sermons, many in the congregation were glad to let him go. As would be seen, the church itself was divided by strong religious and other opinions.

A pulpit committee of five, including Jeremy Stimson and Jabez Chickering, (Note: Both were members of the Harvard class of 1804. Chickering was a lawyer and the son of the minister at Dedham's South Church. He was also a cashier at Dedham Bank. Stimson was a "popular, charming, [and] restless" surgeon.) were charged with finding a new pastor. It was hoped that the new minister's politics would be more in line with the congregation than Bate's were. On March 1, 1818, just days after Bates left town, the committee produced Alvan Lamson. Lamson was an 1817 graduate of Harvard Divinity School, a Unitarian stronghold.

Many of the younger liberals of the parish were likely to have a liberal minister, but the church members were more conservative Calvinists and were less impressed. A large number of other ministers visited the church and preached in the coming months. Besides Lamson, only two others were paid for their services. A Mr. Shaw from Bridgewater was "tried and found below criticism" while Mr. Gilman was "very well liked."

The pulpit committee called for a meeting on July 13, 1818, to discuss the search. The chairman of the committee opened with a speech praising Lamson and it was followed by a motion to contract with him for eight more Sundays. Several of the "most respectable and substantial inhabitants" objected, however, and asked for additional candidates. The pulpit committee refused, and the entire meeting voted to ask the pulpit committee to make a decision. The committee did, and chose Lamson.

Two meetings were held on August 31, 1818. The first, of the parish, voted to call Lamson by a vote of 81–44. (Note: Those voting in favor, it was later pointed out, owned 80% of the taxable property in the town.) The second, of the church, rejected Lamson by a vote of 17–15. The legality of both meetings would later be called into question. At one point it was claimed that 44 of those who voted against Lamson, and four of those who did, at the parish meeting were not legal voters. As a result, the vote tally should have been 77–29. At the church meeting, at least one elderly man was said to have misunderstood what was being voted on due his deafness. The actual vote, it was claimed, should have been 18–14.

Those who opposed Lamson did not raise any objections to his moral or professional qualifications. They did, however, object to his theology and found him lacking in "spirituality and knowledge of the scriptures" and displayed little of "that which fixes the attention and reaches the heart." Lamson's initial reaction seems to have been to decline the call, given the size of the opposition, but he was persuaded to accept by Jabaz Chickering, the chairman of the parish council.

Petitions then began circulating around town. One, supporting Lamson's call, had 29 signatures. Another, opposed to him, garnered 57 with an addendum stating it would be more but several who refused to sign the pro-Lanson petition were made to promise not to sign any. Given the controversy, Lamson decided not to accept the call. Chickering, however, rode to Cambridge and convinced Lamson to change his mind. On September 27, Rev. Ganet of Cambridgeport preached at the Sunday service and read a letter of acceptance from Lamson. Several members of the congregation angrily stormed out of the meetinghouse, a few fainted, and one woman threw a violent fit. A motion at a parish meeting the next day to request Lamson reconsider was rejected, 43–65.

=== The ecclesiastical council ===
After Lamson accepted the parish's call without the concurrence of the church, the parish sent letters to 15 other churches calling for a council to consider the situation. (Note: Hanson has the number at 13 churches.) They were signed by "six members of the church and three who are not" and were sent in the name of "The Religious Congregational Society in the First Parish in Dedham." The letters were dated October 14, 1818.

A council of 13 other churches, all of which were already Unitarian or soon would be, the convened with the minister and one lay delegate from each participating. The council included Judge John Davis, Rev. John Kirkland, Rev. James Walker, Rev. Henry Ware, (Note: Ware himself was the cause of a dispute between Unitarians and Congregationalists at Harvard.) Rev. Charles Lowell, and Rev. William Ellery Channing.

The committee selected Channing to serve as moderator and Rev. Ralph Sanger as scribe. Rev. John Reed of Bridgewater, Kirkland, Channing, Lowell, and Davis were selected to report the findings of the council. At 9:00 a.m. on October 28, 1818, the council met at the Norfolk County Courthouse. They first heard a report from the parish and then heard the long (Note: It is estimated to have taken over one hour to deliver.) and carefully prepared argument of Judge Samuel Haven, who opposed Lamson's appointment.

Haven argued that a church should be able to elect its own pastor and that an ecclesiastical council should not be able to force a Gospel minister upon a church without its consent. Haven also noted that the tradition in New England had long been for a church to make a selection and then present its choice to the parish for ratification. Ordinations, he said, are ecclesiastical events, not civil ones. Additionally, councils are called by churches, Haven said, not by secular authorities. To have the Dedham parish convene this council was to confuse secular and religious authority.

The letters calling for the council asked for the other church's help "in the ordination of Mr. Lamson, as a Gospel Minister over the Church and Society constituting said Parish." After hearing Haven's argument, Chickering backtracked and said they did not ask for Lamson be ordained over the church. Chickering then presented letters showing that if all the members of the church had been present when the vote was taken that there would have been a majority in favor of Lamson. The council was not inclined to consider the views and membership status of the absent members and instead considered Lamson's qualifications.

=== Ordination of Lamson ===
The next day, the council announced to an overflowing church that it would proceed to ordain Lamson. At the ordination ceremony, Deacon Joseph Swan got up and walked out. He was followed by his father-in-law, Deacon Samuel Fales, and a number of others, slamming the hinged pew seats behind them. Haven declared the ordination council was illegitimate and attacked the Result. He declared that the church should call a minister and the parish should not vote until then. If the parish did not agree, the church should present other candidates until a mutually acceptable candidate was found. Lamson's ordination, Haven said, was irregular and should not be recognized by other churches.

The council's final report, prepared by Channing and known as its "Result," was read at the ordination ceremony. The Result accepted the argument of the conservative members that a church may not have a minister imposed upon it without its consent. It added that having a parish ratify the selection of the church is "in the main wise and beneficial,"but is not always possible.

The interests of the parish must also be considered, the Result said, and "that circumstances may exist, in which a minister may be ordained over a parish without the concurrence of the church connected with it." It added that the parish was obliged by law to support a public teacher of morality and may be fined if it did not. The Result lamented the lack of unanimity in the congregation but said that any decision they arrived at would likely upset some members.

In his ordination sermon, Ware said:

It was our hope… that the love of peace and union, and order, a spirit of mutual condescension and forbearance, and a deep regard for the interests of religion, and its sense of values, might have produced a greater degree of unanimity than has been realized… It is not without much deliberation that the ordaining council have come to the determination to proceed to the ordination of the candidate, whom you have chosen in opposition to the opinion and wishes of a large and respectable portion of the church and religious society of this place.

=== Second council ===
Members of the church then called upon other churches to assemble for another council on November 18, 1808. Letters were sent to every other congregational church with the exception of those who participated in the ordination.

Before the second council could assemble, a second vote was taken by the church. In the interest of conciliation, some members initially opposed to Lamson were ready to accept him as their minister. On November 15, a majority of 21 votes were cast for Lamson as minister and a greater number voted to admit him as a member of the church. Many of those still opposed to Lamson boycotted the second vote, calling it irregular and invalid.

The second council, including Dr. Eliphalet Porter of Roxbury, Thaddeus Mason Harris of Dorchester, and John Pierce of Brookline, was unable to come to a unanimous decision. It expressed a mild condemnation of the parish for appointing a minister against the wishes of the church, though some council members pushed for stronger language. Eight members voted their disapproval of the Result for varying reasons.

=== Separation ===
The second council advocated for a reconciliation, but one was not to be had. Two of the three deacons, Fales and Swan, were opposed to Lamson. The third, Jonathan Richards, voted for Lamson but resigned his position after the new minister was settled. According to Massachusetts law at the time, the deacons of the church were the lawful custodians of church property. Swan died within a fortnight of Lamson's ordination.

After Lamson's ordination, the conservative members who opposed Lamson removed all of the church's portable assets, including parish records, funds, and the valuable silver used for communion with them. They also removed cash, bonds, promissory notes, leases, and accounts. The communion silver was kept in a closet within the church, but disappeared after someone entered through a window. The leased land and other transactions brought in about $800 a year and without that income the church would be unable to pay Lamson. The dissenting members claimed that they were the true remnant of the congregation and thus were entitled to hold them.

The remaining members elected Eliphalet Baker and Luther Richards as replacement deacons. They also sent a committee, led by Chickering, to meet with Fales as the senior deacon. They demanded "Christian satisfaction" regarding his deaconship. When they reported back to the liberal sect, they charged Fales with leasing the parsonage house out without the church's consent. (Note: It was rented to a widow, Rebecca Alden, for $1.50 a year.) Fales was also accused of not giving direct answers to their questions, including which group he considered to be the true church. As a result, the liberal group voted to remove Fales as deacon but allowed him to remain a member of the church.

=== Orthodox church ===
As the more liberal members had possession of the meetinghouse, the conservative members began meeting in the home of the deceased former minister, Jason Haven. The new congregation was initially called the Orthodox Church, but was later renamed Allin Congregational Church after John Allin, the founder and first pastor of First Church.

On January 29, 1819, they began advertising for contractors to build them a new meetinghouse. By August, they had raised enough money to begin construction. It was a simple structure, consisting of little more than four walls, a roof, and a few windows. On August 2, as the lot was being prepared for construction, a terrible thunderstorm blew through the town. It was thought that lightning struck at least 40 times within a mile of the church. The following week, as the frame was going up, work was stopped due to a cloudburst. Its dedication on December 30 was conducted in the midst of a blizzard.

=== Haven's pamphlet ===
Haven published a book of over 100 pages outlying the argument against Lamson and included the Result from each council. His name did not appear on it, but it was an open secret who wrote it after it was published in March 1819.

In it, he used derogatory and insulting language to describe his opponents. He also said that bringing Lamson to the church was "both disgusting and ridiculous." He added that the more liberal members who favored Lamson had deliberately stirred up the community and that the meeting on July 13, in which Lamson's stay in the pulpit was extended, was "a farce" marked by "management, intrigue, and deceit." Haven also blamed the dispute as the cause of Deacon Joseph Swan's death. Haven characterized the church meeting in which Lamson was admitted as a member as a "shocking profanation" exhibiting "scenes of wickedness… indecency and barbarity."

In Haven's telling, Chickering was one of the central "plotters" in the whole ordeal. Chickering then attempted to sue Haven for libel, but a grand jury in Norfolk County refused to indict Haven in October 1820. Chickering then tried in Cambridge, where the pamphlet was printed, and a Middlesex Grand Jury did indict him. Haven was arrested on December 1, 1819. Due in part to the long speech Haven gave in his own defense, the trial lasted over two days. (Note: It is thought the Daniel Webster may have assisted Haven.)

Haven argued that he could not have possibly insulted "Alvan Lamson, pastor of the First Church and Parish in Dedham" as he did not think anyone existed by that description. As a member of that church, Haven said, he would have expected his pastor to "admonish me in the spirit of Christian meekness," but in the eight months since the pamphlet was published he had not received any such admonitions. Haven was acquitted.

== Lawsuit ==
=== Trial ===
Deacon Baker, on behalf of the remaining members of the First Church, brought a suit of replevin against Deacon Fales and the breakaway church. (Note: The first legal proceeding, largely inconsequential to the ultimate outcome, as whether or not a writ of replevin was appropriate.) During the April term of 1820, they asked a court to order that the records, funds, silver, and other items be returned. Specifically, they asked for $20,000 in damages, eight silver cups, one silver spoon, one table cloth, one napkin, six metal flagons, four metal platters, one basket, four books of records, and one box of bonds, notes, mortgages, deeds, leases, and accounts.

Fales argued that, as a duly elected deacon of the church, he was within his rights to hold onto the property. The converse implication of this argument was that Baker was not a legitimate deacon, and thus had no right to the property.

At the trial in February 1820, the members of First Church were represented by Judge John Davis and Jabez Chickering while the breakaway church members were represented by Metcalf, Haven, and Prescott. Judge Samuel Wilde, who presided over the trial, instructed the jury that as a matter of law that the plaintiffs, the remaining members of the First Church, were in the right. The jury, however, deliberated all night about "Which is the First Church?" When they came back in the morning without a verdict and asked him that question, they were severely reprimanded by the judge. They returned to their deliberations and came back ten minutes later with a verdict for the plaintiffs.

The case was appealed to the Supreme Judicial Court and was heard during the October 1820 session. There, Massachusett's Solicitor General, Daniel Davis, represented the plaintiffs with Chickering. The breakaway defendants had Daniel Webster and Theron Metcalf representing them. The defendants argued that the trial judge excluded testimony and gave an improper charge to the jury.

=== Decision ===
The case turned on who was to be considered First Church: those who supported Lamson and stayed, or those who opposed him and left. (Note: For reasons that are not clear, the plaintiffs did not use the meeting of November 15, 1818, in which Lamson received a majority vote, as an argument to support their case. It has been theorized that they may have considered the legality of the meeting to be dubious, and thus avoided mentioning it in court.) In a decision written by Chief Justice Isaac Parker in February 1821, the court unanimously ruled that "[w]hatever the usage in settling ministers, the Bill of Rights of 1780 secures to towns, not to churches, the right to elect the minister, in the last resort." They also ruled that the connection between First Church and First Parish was indissoluble. Even if only a minority of church members stayed, as happened in Dedham, it was those members who had a right to the name of the church, to choose deacons, and to hold church property.

Even if a majority of the members left to form a new church, those who remained would constitute First Church. As such, those who remained with Lamson, and not those who left, were to be considered the First Church and thus the rightful owners of the property in question. If all the members of the church left, the parish could form a new church which would be the legal successor of the old. The church, according to the decision, was an appendage of the parish, not an entity unto itself.

The court held that the funds, records, and other property had to be returned to First Church, setting a precedent for future congregational splits that would arise as Unitarianism grew. The orthodox faction supposedly responded to the decision with the saying, "They kept the furniture, but we kept the faith."

Parker has been criticized for using "legal sleight of hand" in his decision and for ignoring the complex history, especially in Dedham, between the church and the society. He was also accused of forming his legal opinion of the Dedham church through his experiences at his own Brattle Street Church.

== Companion suits ==
A number of people involved were also sued personally. A $500 lawsuit was also filed against John Bullard for refusing to turn over the silver. He was eventually fined $75. Alden, the widow who rented the parsonage for $1.50 a year, was also sued for $300 as rent for the two years she lived there. Fales was also personally sued for $1,000 for funds he supposedly received as deacon.

In September, more suits were filed. Baker and others sued Haven for a supposed $3,000 debt on church funds that dated back to 1810. Bullard was sued again, this time for a $935.67 debt dating to 1809, and Elisha McIntosh was sued for a violation of his lease of church lands. Chickering sued John Guild, the parish clerk, for payment of a $200 loan.

== Legacy ==
The case was a major milestone in the road towards the separation of church and state and led to the Commonwealth formally disestablishing the Congregational Church in 1833. It also helped accelerate the conversion of old congregational churches into Unitarian ones. A survey conducted in 1836 found that 3,900 trinitarians had been forced into "exile" by only 1,282 Unitarians. In addition to losing their meetinghouses, they also lost $608,958.

Despite the court ruling, the silver did not stay with First Church. It was returned to First Church, but then stolen one night by Pliny Bingham and Haven. The set was broken up, with various pieces going to different homes for safekeeping. Rumors abounded about where it was, and some of it even was displayed at the Worcester Fair in the 1850s, but it not appear again publicly again in Dedham for more than a century. The flagons were found one morning on the steps of the Dedham Historical Society. The rest remained hidden away until 1969 when it was donated to the Historical Society as a neutral third party. The service has been on permanent loan to the Museum of Fine Arts since then and replicas have been made for both churches.

Despite the ruling, a volume to church records was not returned to First Church. In 1926, it was found in an attic in Dedham and returned to its rightful owners.

== Works cited ==
- Dedham Historical Society (2001). Images of America:Dedham. Arcadia Publishing. ISBN 978-0-7385-0944-0.
- Hanson, Robert Brand (1976). Dedham, Massachusetts, 1635-1890. Dedham Historical Society.
- Lockridge, Kenneth (1985). A New England Town. New York: W.W. Norton & Company. ISBN 978-0-393-95459-3.
- Smith, Frank (1936). A History of Dedham, Massachusetts. Transcript Press, Incorporated.
- Wright, Conrad (1988). "The Dedham Case Revisited". Proceedings of the Massachusetts Historical Society. 3. 100. Massachusetts Historical Society: 15–39. JSTOR 25080991.
