= John Hunting (settler) =

New England settler (1597-1689)

John Hunting (c. 1597-April 12, 1689) was Ruling Elder of the First Church and Parish in Dedham.

== Personal and early life ==
Hunting was born in Hoxne, England in 1597. (Note: Anderson has the year as about 1597 and the place as nearby Thrandeston.) He had strong opinions and from an early age began speaking on religious topics. In particular, he opposed the Catholic views of Charles I. He became the ruling elder of his local church district and spent much time traveling and ministering to those in the area. His ministry and effort to gain converts caused him to spend a great deal of time away from his family.

He married Hester Seaborn, who was related to the martyr John Rogers. They and their five children sailed to New England in 1638 and quickly settled in Dedham, Massachusetts. His son, Samuel Hunting, lived in Charlestown. His oldest son was named John, and he had daughters Mary Buckner, Heaster Fisher, Elizabeth Pecke, and Margaret Ware. (Note: Ware's daughter, Esther, would marry Samuel Man.) His sister, Susan, married Edward Richards.

At his death on April 12, 1689, he had an estate valued at £153.03.11.

== Founder of Dedham ==
Hunting was admitted as a freeman in Dedham on March 13, 1639 and was one of the original proprietors of land there. Beginning in 1658, he served 15 years as Selectman in Dedham.

== First Church ==
Shortly after settling Dedham, Massachusetts in 1635, residents formed a church, today known as First Church and Parish in Dedham. After the doctrinal base was agreed upon, 10 men were selected to seek out the "living stones" upon which the congregation would be based. Hunting, a freeman, was chosen as one of the 10.

The group began to meet separately and, one by one, would leave the room so that the others could elect or reject them. They decided that six of their own number--John Allen, Ralph Wheelock, John Luson, John Fray, Eleazer Lusher, and Robert Hindell—were suitable to form the church. Hunting, who was new to the town, was also deemed acceptable. The eight chosen men submitted themselves to a conference of the entire community.

After the church was gathered, a "tender" search for the flock's first minister settled upon John Allen. After selecting Allin as pastor, the names of Ralph Wheelock, John Hunting, Thomas Carter, and John Kingsbury were put forward for the role of ruling elder with Hunting eventually being selected. The selection process was not easy.

On April 24, 1639, a day of fasting and prayer, Hunting and Allen were ordained in the presence of the Dedham congregation and the elders of other churches. The hands of Allen, Wheelock, and Edward Allyne were laid upon Hunting during his ordination and those of Hunting, Wheelock, and Allyne were laid upon Allen for his ordination.

== Legacy ==
Hunting died April 12, 1689, and is buried at the Old Village Cemetery.

Two hundred years later, the first Catholic Mass in Dedham was celebrated in Sunday, May 15, 1843, in the home of Daniel Slattery. The home was located on land once owned by Hunting.

== Works cited ==
- Lockridge, Kenneth (1985). A New England Town. New York: W.W. Norton & Company. ISBN 978-0-393-95459-3.
- Smith, Frank (1936). A History of Dedham, Massachusetts. Transcript Press, Incorporated.
- Byrne, William; Leahy, W. A.; Dowling, Austin; Young, E. J. A.; Finen, J. E. (1899). Introductory. The Hurd & Everts co. pp. 323–324.
- Tuttle, Julius H. (1915). "A pioneer in the public service of the church and of the college". Publications of the Colonial Society of Massachusetts. 17. The Colonial Society of Massachusetts.
- Hurd, Duane Hamilton (1884). History of Norfolk County, Massachusetts: With Biographical Sketches of Many of Its Pioneers and Prominent Men. J. W. Lewis & Company. p. 34.
- Worthington, Erastus (1827). The history of Dedham: from the beginning of its settlement, in September 1635, to May 1827. Dutton and Wentworth. p. 102.
- Morse, Abner (1861). A Genealogical Register of the Descendants of Several Ancient Puritans, V. 3: The Richards Family. H.W. Dutton.
- Hanson, Robert Brand (1976). Dedham, Massachusetts, 1635-1890. Dedham Historical Society.
