= Allin Congregational Church =

Coordinates: 42.2495°N 71.1775°W

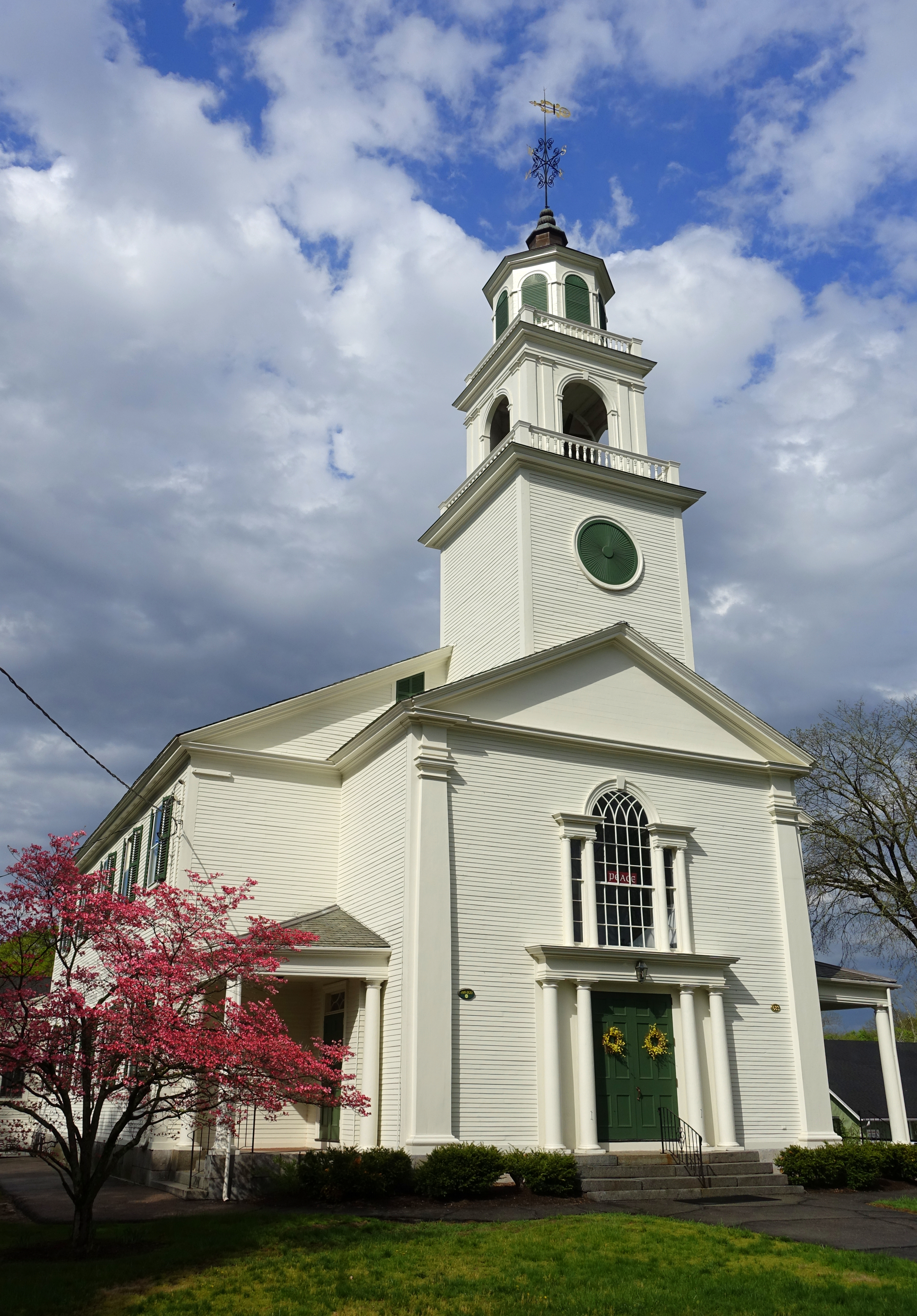
- Allin Congregational Church
- Location: Dedham, Massachusetts
- Country: United States
- Denomination: United Church of Christ (1963–present)
- Previous denomination: Congregational Christian Churches (1931–1950s); National Association of Congregational Christian Churches (c. 1950s–1963)
- Website: www.allinchurch.org

History
- Former names: First Church in Dedham (1818–1929); The Orthodox Church (c. 19th century)
- Founded: 1818

Architecture
- Style: Greek Revival
- Years built: 1819

Administration
- District: Southern New England Conference of the UCC

Allin Congregational Church is an historic United Church of Christ church in Dedham, Massachusetts. It was built in 1818 by conservative breakaway members of Dedham's First Church and Parish in the Greek Revival style.

== History ==
The preaching of Jonathan Edwards and George Whitefield helped to revive the churches of Dedham during the Great Awakening. The theological debates that arose as a result, however, helped bring about a split in the churches into different denominations. Allin Congregational Church was founded in 1818 when more conservative members of the First Church and Parish broke off from the increasingly liberal First Church.

In the early 19th century, all Massachusetts towns were Constitutionally required to tax their citizens "for the institution of the public worship of God, and for the support and maintenance of public Protestant teachers of piety." All residents of a town were assessed, as members of the parish, whether or not they were also members of the church. The "previous and long standing practice [was to have] the church vote for the minister and the parish sanction this vote."

A bear escaped from the estate of eccentric sewing machine magnate William Emerson Baker in 1888 and spent the night under the Church's porch before returning to Needham the next day.

=== Split with First Church ===
In 1818 "Dedham [claimed] rights distinct from the church and against the vote of the church." The town, as the parish, selected a liberal Unitarian minister, Rev. Alvan Lamson, to serve the First Church in Dedham. The members of the church were more traditional and rejected Lamson by a vote of 18–14. When the parish installed and ordained Lamson, the more conservative or orthodox members left in 1818 decided to form a new church nearby.

During the split, the departing members included Deacon Samuel Fales, who took parish records, funds, and the valuable silver used for communion with him. Members of the First Church sued and the case, Baker v. Fales, reached the Supreme Judicial Court. The court ruled that "[w]hatever the usage in settling ministers, the Bill of Rights of 1780 secures to towns, not to churches, the right to elect the minister, in the last resort."

The court held that the property had to be returned to First Church, setting a precedent for future congregational splits that would arise as Unitarianism grew. The case was a major milestone in the road towards the separation of church and state and led to the Commonwealth formally disestablishing the Congregational Church in 1833. The orthodox faction supposedly responded to the decision with the saying, "They kept the furniture, but we kept the faith."

Despite the court ruling, the silver was not returned to First Church. It remained hidden away until 1969 when it was donated to the Dedham Historical Society as a neutral third party. Today it is on permanent loan to the Museum of Fine Arts, and replicas have been made for both churches.

The new congregation was initially called the Orthodox Church, but was later renamed Allin Congregational Church after John Allin, the founder and first pastor of First Church. Shortly after the Massachusetts Supreme Judicial Court ruled in Baker v. Fales that the rival faction was, in fact, the First Church, the Orthodox Church ordained their first minister, Ebenezer Burgess. The letters calling for a council, however, went out in the name of "the First Church." (Note: Herman Mann was not pleased, writing "...notwithstanding names are so cheap that they may be had for nothing, they chose to steal their neighbors', and in utter contempt of all law, justice, and even common decency.")

=== Burgess pastorate ===
Burgess served as the minister for 40 years, from 1821 until 1861. He agreed to serve in exchange for $2,800 and a house. He first preached in the church in July 1820, and was ordained on March 14, 2821. Communion was celebrated every sixth Sunday.

Burgess was deeply interested in the work of the American Colonization Society which encouraged the migration of free blacks to Africa. In the run up to the Civil War, "he did not support the anti-slavery movement" and segregated the pews in the church by race.

When a visiting southern clergyman was traveling through the area, Burgess would often invite him to preach. Congregants were sometimes offended by what the visiting preacher had to say. However, when President Joseph Jenkins Roberts of Liberia would visit the United States, he would frequently preach from the Allin pulpit. William Jenks, a pastor from Green Street in Boston, would spend the summers in Dedham. Burgess would invite him to stand on his left during services and Jenks would lead the "long prayer."

The deacons during this time were John Doggett and Martin Draper and the sexton was Comfort Weatherbee. (Note: Doggett lived on Court Street and transported the communion cups and plates in a wicker basket he made himself.)

=== 20th century ===
The church was officially incorporated in 1929. Allin Church joined the Congregational Christian Churches when the denomination was created in 1931. In the 1950s, the church became part of the conservative denomination the National Association of Congregational Christian Churches, before leaving in 1963, when it became part of the United Church of Christ.

== Church ==
=== Construction ===
As the more liberal members had possession of the meetinghouse immediately after the split, the conservative members began meeting in the home of the deceased former minister, Jason Haven. On January 29, 1819, they began advertising for contractors to build them a new meetinghouse. By August, they had raised enough money to begin construction.

On August 2, as the lot was being prepared for construction, a terrible thunderstorm blew through the town. It was thought that lightning struck at least 40 times within a mile of the church. The following week, as the frame was going up, work was stopped due to a cloudburst. Its dedication on December 30 was conducted in the midst of a blizzard.

The church was constructed by Jacob Clarke, with William Clarke placing the carved finial on top of the tower. It was a simple structure, consisting of little more than four walls, a roof, and a few windows. Inside, the unpainted pews had high backs and doors. There were wall pews on either side, with pews in the back reserved for people of color, but they were rarely, if ever, used.

The center pulpit was elevated and enclosed, with a door on either side. Brass rings hung over the windows in the gallery, but curtains were not attached. Two large sheet-iron wood stoves provided heat and hot ashes for foot stoves.

The stables in the cellar were paved with wood blocks. The choir sang from a gallery in the rear.

=== 1846 renovation ===
The interior was renovated in 1846 while Burgess traveled in Europe. The pews were painted and the walls were frescoed. An arch-niche was put in behind the pulpit.

The pulpit was replaced with one with a polished rosewood veneer to match the new rosewood communion table with carved legs and black marble top. A carpet was installed and the roof was slated.

=== Music ===
The first organ, which was purchased used, was introduced to the church in 1852. Comfort Weatherbee and a few others found one in storage in Boston and purchased it for $300. After it was installed in the arch, the various musicians were crowded out and no longer performed. A new organ was introduced in 1858. John Thayer played it for a few months until he accepted a position playing the organ at nearby St. Paul's.

A double bass viol, no longer needed with the organ, was instead loaned to the Baptist Church in Mill Village. The tune books used were first the "Handel and Haydn Collection" and then the "Carmina Sacra." The hymn book used was "Watts and Select Hymns" but the congregation did not sing along even though they stood and faced the choir. A singing school was run in the church during the winter months which provided singers for the choir.

The current organ at Allin Church is over 100 years old and contains 3,500 air-blown pipes. Originally built in 1912 by Ernest M. Skinner for Appleton Chapel at Harvard University, and some of the pipework was altered by Skinner in 1931. The next year, Appleton Chapel was demolished and replaced by the current Memorial Church. The organ was put into storage, and in 1938 was installed at Allin Church by the Frazee Organ Co. In 1958 R. Kershaw changed nine ranks of pipes and added a new coupler. Today, the organ has 55 ranks of pipes and a repaired console which was added in 1999. Organist and Minister of Music at Allin Church, C. Martin Steinmetz, was organist for over 50 years until his retirement in 2017.

== Chapels ==
Burgess built a chapel immediately behind the church and another was constructed behind Benjamin Boyden's store in Mill Village. The East Dedham chapel had an open timbered framework and was occasionally used for religious services.

== Ministers ==
| Number | Minister | Years of service | Notes |
|---|---|---|---|
| 1* | John Allen | 1639-1671 | |
| 2* | John Phillips | 1639-1641 | |
| | Vacant | 1671-1673 | |
| 3* | William Adams | December 3, 1673 – August 17, 1686 | |
| | Vacant | 1685-1693 | |
| 4* | Joseph Belcher | November 29, 1693 – April 27, 1723 | (Note: Belcher preached until 1721 when illness prevented him from doing so any further.) |
| 5* | Samuel Dexter | May 6, 1724 – January 29, 1755 | |
| 6* | Jason Haven | February 5, 1756 – May 17, 1803 | |
| 7* | Joshua Bates | March 16, 1803-February 20-1818 | |
| 8 | Ebenezer Burgess | March 14, 1821 – March 13, 1861 | |
| 9 | Jonathan Edwards | 1863-1874 | (Note: In 1869, Edwards offered the dedicatory prayer at the dedication of Memorial Hall.) |
| 10 | Charles McLellan Southgate | 1875-1884 | |
| 11 | Joseph B. Seabury | 1885-1899 | |
| 12 | Edward Huntting Rudd | 1900-1909 | |
| 13 | William Thomas Beale | 1909-1917 | |
| 14 | Oliver Dana Sewall | 1918-1920 | |
| 15 | George Manley Butler | 1921-1934 | |
| 16 | John Franklin Robinson | 1935–45 | |
| 17 | Harry Raymond Butman | 1945-1953 | |
| 18 | Richard Gould Hinds | 1954-1957 | |
| 19 | Elton Winslow Brown | 1958-1963 | |
| 20 | William Henry Brittain | 1963-1976 | |
| 21 | Taylor Eugene Roth | 1977-1994 | |
| 22 | Jan-Willem van der Werff | 2001-2006 | |
| 23 | Cheryl Kerr | June 14, 2009–June 20, 2021 | (Note: Kerr, a native of New Jersey, was the 23rd pastor of the church. She earned a Master of Divinity degree from Andover Theological School. With her husband, Itamar Santos, she had three children, Grace, Ethan, and Gabriel. Kerr left the Allin Congregational Church to become senior pastor at a UCC church in Newton, Massachusetts.) |
| Interim | Christopher Lyman Waldron | 2021-2023 | |
| 24 | Anne Marie Holloway | January 1, 2024- | (Note: Holloway was called to be the church's 24th minister in 2023 and began on January 1, 2024. She is a native of South Weymouth, Massachusetts, and studied at Bridgewater State College. In 2018, she was graduated from Boston University's School of Theology and was ordained in the United Church of Christ. Before coming to Dedham, she was an Associate Minister at the Wellesley Hills Congregational Church.) |
*Was minister of the First Church and Parish in Dedham before the schism.

== Notable members ==
- Warren Fales Draper's father was a deacon of the church, and Draper attended as a child.
- William Alcott was the superintendent of the Sunday School.
- Mr. Packard was the sexton in the mid-1800s. (Note: Packard owned a stove store on Church Street.)
- James F. Fish, publisher of the Puritan Recorder and superintendent of the Sunday School.

== See also ==
- First Church of Christ, Scientist (Dedham, Massachusetts)
- St. Mary's Church (Dedham, Massachusetts)
- St. Susanna Church (Dedham, Massachusetts)

== Works cited ==
- Abbott, Katharine M. (1903). Old Paths And Legends Of New England (PDF). New York: The Knickerbocker Press. pp. 290–297.
- Beach, Seth C.; Sanford, Carroll; Smith, Nathaniel; Whitney, Mrs. S.W.; Maynard, Mrs. C.E.; Capen, Charles James (1878). Covenant of the First Church in Dedham: With Some Facts of History and Illustrations of Doctrine; for the Use of the Church. H. H. McQuillen.
- Burgess, Ebenezer (1840). Dedham Pulpit: Or, Sermons by the Pastors of the First Church in Dedham in the XVIIth and XVIIIth Centuries. Perkins & Marvin.
- Clarke, Wm. Horatio (1903). Mid-Century Memories of Dedham. Dedham Historical Society.
- Dedham Historical Society (2001). Images of America:Dedham. Arcadia Publishing. ISBN 978-0-7385-0944-0.
- Hanson, Robert Brand (1976). Dedham, Massachusetts, 1635-1890. Dedham Historical Society.
- Lockridge, Kenneth (1985). A New England Town. New York: W.W. Norton & Company. ISBN 978-0-393-95459-3.
- Smith, Frank (1936). A History of Dedham, Massachusetts. Transcript Press, Incorporated.
- Warren, Charles (1931). Jacobin and Junto: Or, Early American Politics as Viewed in the Diary of Dr. Nathaniel Ames, 1758-1822. Harvard University Press.
- Worthington, Erastus (1827). The history of Dedham: from the beginning of its settlement, in September 1635, to May 1827. Dutton and Wentworth.
