= First Church and Parish in Dedham =

Congregation in Massachusetts, US

Coordinates: 42.2491°N 71.1776°W

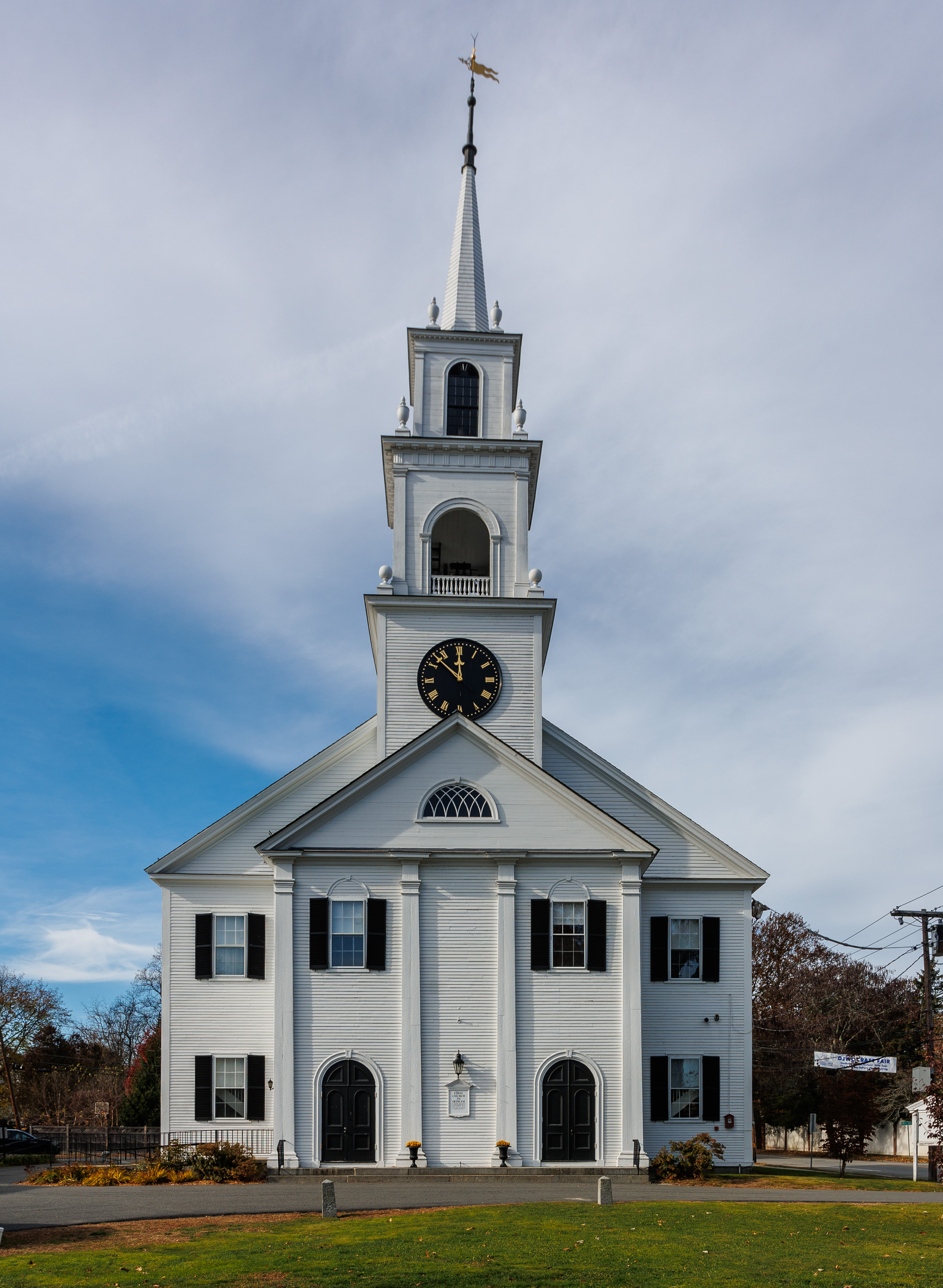
First Church and Parish, Dedham MA

The First Church and Parish in Dedham is a Unitarian Universalist congregation in Dedham, Massachusetts. It was the 14th church established in Massachusetts. Amelia Shenstone is the minister.

== History ==
Dedham was first settled in 1635 and incorporated in 1636. On July 18, 1637, the Town voted to admit a group of very religious men that would radically change the course of the town's history. Led by John Allin, they included Michael Metcalf, Thomas Wight, (Note: Wight came from the same town in England as Ann Hutchinson and was a parishioner of John Cotton with her. He may have chosen to move to Dedham to avoid the controversy she was stirring up in Boston.) Robert Hinsdale, Eleazer Lusher, Timothy Dalton, and Allin's brother-in-law, Thomas Fisher. Dalton was invited to settle in "civil condition," but it was made clear he was not going to be made the town's minister over Allin. He and Thomas Carter quickly sold their land holdings and left town, Dalton to become a teaching officer in the church of what is today Hampton, New Hampshire, and Carter to the pulpit in Woburn, Massachusetts. Ezekiel Holliman, on the other hand, recognized that as a religious liberal that he was not going to be welcome in town and so moved to Rhode Island with Roger Williams.

=== Establishment ===
While it was of the utmost importance for the founders, "founding a church was more difficult than founding a town." Meetings were held late in 1637 and were open to "all the inhabitants who affected church communion... lovingly to discourse and consult together [on] such questions as might further tend to establish a peaceable and comfortable civil society and prepare for spiritual communion." On the fifth day of every week they would meet in a different home and would discuss any issues "as he felt the need, all 'humbly and with a teachable heart not with any mind of cavilling or contradicting.'"

After they became acquainted with one another, they asked if "they, as a collection of Christian strangers in the wilderness, have any right to assemble with the intention of establishing a church?" Their understanding of the Bible led them to believe that they did, and so they continued to establish a church based on Christian love, but also one that had requirements for membership. In order to achieve a "further union", they determined the church must "convey unto us all the ordinances of Christ's instituted worship, both because it is the command of God... and because the spiritual condition of every Christian is such as stand in need of all instituted ordinances for the repair of the spirit." The group would meet for worship under a large tree in the forest, believed to be near the site of the current church. (Note: Some records have the site as being closer to Dwight's Brook, near the home of John Dwight.)

It took months of discussions before a church covenant could be agreed upon and drafted. The group established thirteen principles, written in a question and answer format, that established the doctrine of the church. In the summer of 1638, Allen, by common consent, was asked to organize a church and chose Wheelock as his assistant.

Once the doctrinal base was agreed upon, 10 men were selected by John Allin, assisted by Ralph Wheelock, to seek out the "pillars" or "living stones" upon which the congregation would be based. They began to meet separately and decided six of their own number—Allin, Wheelock, John Luson, John Frary, Eleazer Lusher, and Robert Hinsdale—were suitable to form the church. (Note: Luson, Hinsdale, and Lusher all arrived in Dedham with Allin, and Frary was from the same town in England as Michael Metcalf.)

The group began to meet separately and, one by one, beginning with Allen, they would leave the room so that the others could elect or reject them. They decided that six of their own number--John Allen, Ralph Wheelock, John Luson, John Fray, Eleazer Lusher, and Robert Hinsdale—were suitable to form the church. John Hunting, who was new to the town, was also deemed acceptable.

One of the original ten, Edward Alleyn, was considered a borderline case. Timothy Dalton had questions about Alleyn's activities in the Watertown church and Francis Austin cited personal "offenses and distastes" but, having been satisfactorily addressed, Alleyn gained approval to proceed.

Two of the 10 were not found acceptable to be founders. Joseph Kingsbury, who was "stiff and unhumbled," went into a "distempered, passionate flying out upon one of the company" during his questioning. After that, Kinsgbury and Thomas Morse, members of the original ten, agreed at the end of the discussions to suspend their candidacies for the time being. Anthony Fisher took some time to "see and be humbled" for the "pride and height of his spirit," but he was eventually accepted. Some further questions arose that could not be answered, however, and so his acceptance was rescinded.

The eight men then submitted themselves to a conference of the entire community. The group of eight were led by Allin, and the church membership was essentially only members of his party until 1640.

The group sent letters to other churches and to magistrates informing them of their intention to form a church. The Great and General Court responded by saying that no church should be gathered without the advice of other churches and the consent of the government. As they did not believe they needed the approval of any outside body to gather a church, they wrote to the governor seeking an explanation. He confirmed that there was no intent to abridge their liberties and that gathering a church in the manner they proposed was not unlawful.

Finally, on November 8, 1638, two years after the incorporation of the town and one year after the first church meetings were held, the covenant was signed and the church was gathered. Guests from other towns were invited for the event as they sought the "advice and counsel of the churches" and the "countenance and encouragement of the magistrates."

At the first service, Wheelock began with a prayer and then Allen spoke to the assembly. Each of the eight members then made a public profession of faith. Allen then asked the invited church elders to confer and address the congregation on what they had observed. Rev. Mr. Mathers of Dorchester then spoke to say that they saw nothing objectionable and closed with "a most loving exhortation." The church elders then extended the right hand of fellowship to the new congregation.

=== Early years ===
On the Sunday after Allen's ordination, he informed the congregation that any children of church members who had not yet been baptized could receive it on the following Sunday. John and Hannah Dwight brought their daughters, Mary and Sarah, and they became the first people to be baptized in the church. Communion was distributed on the Sunday after that.

Widows who cared for the meetinghouse were church officers. Deacons began being elected in 1650 with Henry Chickering and Nathan Aldus the first men elected to the role. Their role was to sing psalms and to hold the collection boxes as congregants filed before them to drop in money for the poor. The magistrates and "chief gentleman" went first, followed by the elders and male members of the congregation. Then came single people, widows, and women without their husbands.

Though Allen's salary was donated freely by members and non-members alike his salary was never in arrears, showing the esteem in which the other members of the community held him. In the 1670s, as the Utopian spirit of the community waned, it became necessary to impose a tax to ensure the minister was paid. There were 106 taxpayers assessed for paying the minister's salary in 1678. A fine of five shillings for not sitting in the correct pew also helped raise funds for the church.

Prior to Jason Haven becoming minister, the church had very infrequently enforced a provision requiring anyone who had sex before marriage to confess the sin before the entire congregation. The first records of such confessions took place during the pastorate of Samuel Dexter, and they were rare. Such confessions increased dramatically during Haven's term, however. During his first 25 years there were 25 such confessions, of which 14 came during the years 1771 to 1781. In 1781, he preached a sermon condemning fornication and the then-common practice of women sleeping with men who professed their intention to marry. The sermon was so long and memorable that decades later, in 1827, congregants still remembered the ashamed looks on the faces of those gathered and how uncomfortable many were.

A woman was suspended by the church in 1735 for her evil speaking, reviling, and reproachful language.

Seeing the success the Anglican Church down the street had renting out land, First Church began renting out lots around the meetinghouse. A notice appeared in the Columbian Minerva on January 6, 1801:

A number of House Lots in Dedham will be leased for 999 years at public vendue on the premmises, on Monday the ninth day of February next at one of the clock PM, being laid out upon the land belonging to the Rev Mr Haven's Church near the Court House and Meeting House. The soil is good, the situation excellent for mechanics and such as wish to live retired in a pleasant village on the banks of the Charles River."

Among those who rented land were Deacon Martin Marsh, who built the Norfolk House, and the owners of the competing Phoenix Hotel. (Note: Located at the present day site of the Knights of Columbus building at the intersection on Washington and High Streets.) By 1818, it was bringing in about $800 a year.

=== Membership ===
At first, only "visible saints" were pure enough to become members. A public confession of faith was required, as was a life of holiness. It was not good enough just to have been baptized, because then "papists, heretics, and many visible atheists that are baptized must be received." A group of the most pious men interviewed all who sought admission to the church. To become a member, a candidate must "pour out heart and soul in public confession" and subject every innermost desire to the scrutiny of their peers. Those who did not meet the requirements could not join the church, nor receive communion, be baptized, or become an officer of the church.

Once the church was established, residents would gather several times a week to hear sermons and lectures in practical piety whether or not they were members. By 1648, 70% of the men and many of their wives, and in some cases the wives only, had become members of the Church. There were about 70 members in 1651, including 75% of homeowners.

Between the years of 1644 and 1653, 80% of children born in town were baptized, indicating that at least one parent was a member of the church. Servants and masters, young and old, rich and poor alike all joined the church. Non-members were not discriminated against as seen by several men being elected selectmen before they were accepted as members of the church.

While in early years nearly every resident of the town was a member of the church, membership gradually slowed until only eight new members were admitted from 1653 to 1657. None joined between 1657 and 1662 or from 1668 to 1671, when the existent record ends. (Note: The records pick up again in 1724.)

By 1663, nearly half the men in town were not members, and this number grew as more second generation Dedhamites came of age. The decline was so apparent across the colony by 1660 that a future could be seen when a minority of residents were members, as happened in Dedham by 1670. It was worried that the third generation, if they were born without a single parent who was a member, could not even be baptized. The number of infant baptisms in the church fell by half during this period, from 80% to 40%.

To resolve the problem, an assembly of ministers from throughout Massachusetts endorsed a "half-way covenant" in 1657 and then again at a church synod in 1662. It allowed parents who were baptized but not members of the church to present their own children for baptism; however, they were denied the other privileges of church membership, including communion. Allen endorsed the measure but the congregation rejected it, striving for a pure church of saints.

Initially, a public profession of faith was officially required to join the church, though in practice it was not always enforced. By 1742 a person might, at their own discretion, make either a public profession or a private one to the minister to gain admittance. By 1793, the minister would propose a new member and, if no objection was raised within two weeks, they would be admitted.

Women could be members of the church but could not vote in the church meeting.

=== Covenants ===
The first covenant was signed the day the church was gathered, November 8, 1638. New covenants were later adopted on May 23, 1683, March 4, 1742, in 1767, and on April 11, 1793.

The 1793 covenant was much broader than those that preceded it. Jason Haven, the minister at the time, expressed the prevailing belief in the church that all should be permitted to "enjoy the right of his private opinion provided he doth not break in upon the rights of others." The new covenant allowed anyone who declared himself to be a Christian to be admitted as a member. A committee including Haven and Aaron Fuller were appointed to draft this new standard for admitting members.

We profess our belief in the Christian Religion. We unite ourselves together for the purpose of obeying the precepts and honoring the institutions of the religion which we profess. We covenant and agree with each other to live together as a band of Christian brethren; to give and receive counsel and reproof with meekness and candor; to submit with a Christian temper to the discipline which the Gospel authorizes the church to administer; and diligently to seek after the will of God, and carefully endeavor to obey all His commandments.

=== Dissent and division of the church ===
As the town grew and residents began moving to outlying areas, the town was divided into parishes and precincts. Parishes could hire their own ministers and teachers while precincts could do that and elect their own tax assessors and militia officers.

In 1717, the Town Meeting voted, in what was the first ever concession to outlying areas, to exempt residents from paying the minister's salary if they lived more than five miles from the meetinghouse. Those who chose to do so could begin attending another church in another town. In May 1721, Town Meeting refused to allow an outlying section of town to hire their own minister, prompting that group to seek to break away as the town of Walpole.

The Clapboard Trees section of town had more liberal religious views than did those in either the original village or South Dedham. After a deadlocked Town Meeting could not resolve the squabbling between the various parts of town, the General Court first put them in the second precinct with South Dedham, and then in the first precinct with the village. This did not satisfy many of them, however, and in 1735 they hired their own minister along with some likeminded residents of the village. This was an act of dubious legality and the General Court once again stepped in, this time to grant them status as the third precinct and, with it, the right to establish their own church. The General Court also allowed more liberal minded members of conservative churches to attend the more liberal churches in town, and to apply their taxes to pay for them.

=== Meetinghouses ===
==== 1638 meetinghouse ====
Almost immediately after arriving, the group began holding prayer meetings and worship services under various trees around town. On January 1, 1638, the Town voted to construct a meetinghouse that was 36' by 20' and to be built using trees from Wigwam Plain. It was originally planned to be constructed on High Street, near the present day border with Westwood, but those who lived on East Street argued that it should be built more centrally. In July it was ordered to be built on an acre of land at the eastern end of Joseph Kingsbury's lot and Kingsbury was given another acre of land in return.

In August 1638, John Hayward and Nicholas Phillips were hired to gather thatch for the roof. Thomas Fisher also worked on the building, but died before his work was completed. In November, the Town began debating how much to pay his widow for the work that he did. It is unclear when the building was finished, but presumably was not complete before that November meeting.

The pews were 4.5 feet wide and 5 feet deep. In front of the pulpit sat elders and the deacons, with the communion table between them. Men sat on one side, women and girls on the other, with the boys up front.

An addition was ordered to be built in 1646, but the construction proceeded so slowly that town records quickly saw residents complaining. Also in 1648, the Town voted to plaster the interior but the work was never completed. In 1653, residents attempted to complete the work by inviting all residents to come together for a plastering party, but the effort was unsuccessful. The plastering was not completed until 1657.

Joshua Fisher agreed to shingle the meetinghouse on January 17, 1651-2 and to have it done by June 24, 1652, in return for £15 but was ultimately paid £20.

A vote to purchase a bell was made in 1648, but a bell was not hung until February 1652. A year prior, on February 2, 1651, the Town sent Eleazer Lusher to Boston to purchase one six bells left to the Town of Boston in the will of Thomas Cromwell, a privateer operating under a commission from Robert Rich, 2nd Earl of Warwick that was looted from a Spanish ship. Francis Chickering put up £5.12 to pay for the bell, but was not quickly repaid. Lusher also arraigned for Daniel Pond to construct a frame to hang the bell from the north end of the meetinghouse, but Pond was not paid immediately for his work either.

As a result of the bell being hung, the Town no longer needed to pay Ralph Day to beat a drum announcing the start of meetings. The bell was rung not only to announce the start of public meetings, but also to alert residents of a fire, to announce a death, and to signal the start of church services.

Pond was also hired in December 1651 to add two windows to the back of the meetinghouse. The next month, a vote was taken to re-shingle the building and to fix its three doors. Pond built an additional gallery in 1659. In 1665, the walls were clapboarded and permanent seats were installed in the east gallery.

Until a separate schoolhouse was completed, the meetinghouse also served as a classroom. The roof of the east gallery also served as a storehouse for the town's supply of gunpowder following a 1653 vote.

==== 1673 meetinghouse ====
A referendum to build a new meetinghouse, held on February 3, 1673, was conducted with voters casting a piece of white corn if they were in favor and a piece of red corn if they were opposed. The vote was nearly unanimous in favor. The new meetinghouse was erected on June 16, 1673.

==== 1762 meetinghouse ====
As the Samuel Dexter House went up across the street, the town voted to erect a new meetinghouse in 1762. Carpenters began to frame it in May, and Rev. Jason Haven gave a eulogy to the old meetinghouse on June 6. The old meetinghouse was pulled down the next day, requiring Haven to preach to a congregation gathered on his front lawn on June 20. It took four days to frame the new meetinghouse, which was complete on July 1. The town fired its cannon three times in celebration. The first sermon was given inside in the new church on July 20.

It stood 60' long by 45' wide, with two stairways leading to the gallery. Haven personally laid out the high backed pews which were separated from the high pulpit by stairs and doors. Samuel Dexter, the former minister's son, donated a clock that only tolled on the hour, which made it unlikely to interrupt a sermon.

When Norfolk County was established in 1792, the courts met in the meetinghouse until the Norfolk County Courthouse could be built. In the winter they had to move to the Ames Tavern, however, because the meetinghouse lacked a fireplace or other heating system.

It was at a signing school in this meetinghouse that Jason Fairbanks would meet Elizabeth Fales, the woman he was convicted of murdering. Interest was so great in the trial that the courthouse could not accommodate the crowds, and so it was moved to the meetinghouse.

Votes were taken in 1805 and 1807 to expand the meetinghouse, but nothing came from either effort. When Alvan Lamson first preached there in 1818, he said it was "little changed, except by the hand of time and of neglect... It was the most antiquated-looking structure, I thought, I had ever seen."

==== 1820 renovation ====
While a lawsuit was still pending to determine which sect was the meetinghouse's rightful congregation, those in possession voted $2,000 to repair the roof within 30 days. As part of the renovation, the meetinghouse was reoriented to face the Little Common. As a result, it no longer faced the street, and the Orthodox Church across the street. It is not clear whether such a move was planned or intended.

In the church, a portrait of Alvan Lamson is to the left of the pulpit and one of Joseph Belcher hangs to the right.

== Split with the Allin Congregational Church ==
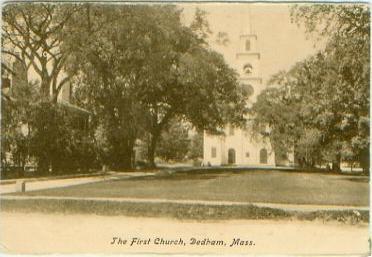
The First Church of Dedham and church green in 1906

=== Background ===
The preaching of Jonathan Edwards and George Whitefield helped to revive the churches of Dedham during the Great Awakening. The theological debates that arose as a result, however, helped bring about a split in the churches into different denominations.

In the early 19th century, all Massachusetts towns were Constitutionally required to tax their citizens "for the institution of the public worship of God, and for the support and maintenance of public Protestant teachers of piety." All residents of a town were assessed, as members of the parish, whether or not they were also members of the church. The "previous and long standing practice [was to have] the church vote for the minister and the parish sanction this vote."

Shortly before he died, Haven wrote a final message to his congregation. It was delivered from the pulpit after his death by Rev. Prentiss of Medfield. In it, Haven entreated his flock

as far as possible, to keep the unity of the spirit in the bond of peace; that you may know how good and pleasant it is, for brethren to live together in love and harmony. Let this be your care, particularly, in your endeavors to obtain an able and faithful minister of the New Testament, to take the pastoral charge of you. Let there be no strife and contention in the important affair of settling a minister of the gospel of peace.

=== Selection of Lamson ===
In 1818 "Dedham [claimed] rights distinct from the church and against the vote of the church." The town, as the parish, selected a liberal Unitarian minister, Rev. Alvan Lamson, to serve the First Church in Dedham. The members of the church were more traditional and rejected Lamson by a vote of 18-14. A council of 13 other churches, all of which were already Unitarian or soon would be, the convened with the minister and one lay delegate from each participating. The council included Judge John Davis, Rev. John Kirkland, Rev. James Walker, Rev. Henry Ware, (Note: Ware himself was the cause of a dispute between Unitarians and Congregationalists at Harvard.) Rev. Charles Lowell, and Rev. William Ellery Channing.

They first heard a report from the parish and then heard the long (Note: It is estimated to have taken over one hour to deliver.) and carefully prepared argument of Judge Samuel Haven, who opposed Lamson's appointment. Haven argued that a church should be able to elect its own pastor and that an ecclesiastical council should not be able to force a Gospel minister upon a church without its consent. Haven also noted that the tradition in New England had long been for a church to make a selection and then present its choice to the parish for ratification. Ordinations, he said, are ecclesiastical events, not civil ones. Additionally, councils are called by churches, Haven said, not by secular authorities. To have the Dedham parish convene this council was to confuse secular and religious authority.

The next day, the council announced to an overflowing church that it would proceed to ordain Lamson. At the ordination ceremony, Deacon Joseph Swan got up and walked out. He was followed by his father-in-law, Deacon Samuel Fales, and a number of others, slamming the hinged pew seats behind them. Haven declared the ordination council was illegitimate and attacked the Result. He declared that the church should call a minister and the parish should not vote until then. If the parish did not agree, the church should present other candidates until a mutually acceptable candidate was found. Lamson's ordination, Haven said, was irregular and should not be recognized by other churches.

=== Lawsuit ===
When the parish installed and ordained Lamson, the more conservative or members left and decided to form a new church nearby, what is now known as the Allin Congregational Church. (Note: The new church was named from John Allen, the original pastor of First Church.) The departing members included Deacon Samuel Fales, who took parish records, funds, and the valuable silver used for communion with him.

The case reached the Supreme Judicial Court who ruled that "[w]hatever the usage in settling ministers, the Bill of Rights of 1780 secures to towns, not to churches, the right to elect the minister, in the last resort." The court held that the property had to be returned to First Church, setting a precedent for future congregational splits that would arise as Unitarianism grew. The case was a major milestone in the road towards the separation of church and state and led to the Commonwealth formally disestablishing the Congregational Church in 1833. The orthodox faction supposedly responded to the decision with the saying, "They kept the furniture, but we kept the faith."

Despite the court ruling, the silver was not returned to First Church. It remained hidden away until 1969 when it was donated to the Dedham Historical Society as a neutral third party. Today it is on permanent loan to the Museum of Fine Arts, and replicas have been made for both churches.

== Ministers ==
Minister	Years of service	Notes
John Allen	1639–1671	
John Phillips	1639–1641	
Vacant	1671–1673	
William Adams	December 3, 1673 – August 17, 1686	
Vacant	1685–1693	
Joseph Belcher	November 29, 1693 – April 27, 1723	(Note: Belcher preached until 1721 when illness prevented him from doing so any further.)
Samuel Dexter	May 6, 1724 – January 29, 1755	
Jason Haven	February 5, 1756 – May 17, 1803	
Joshua Bates	March 16, 1803 – February 20, 1818	
Alvan Lamson	October 29, 1818 – October 29, 1860	
Benjamin H. Bailey	March 14, 1861 – October 13, 1867	
George McKean Folsom	March 31, 1869 – July 1, 1875	
Seth Curtis Beach	December 29, 1875 – 1888	
William H. Fish, Jr.	1889 – 1897	
J. Worsley Austin	October 15, 1898 – 1902	
Roger S. Forbes	1903 – 1908	
William H. Parker	1909 – 1921	
Charles R. Joy	1922 – 1927	
Lyman V. Rutledge	1927 – 1949	
Addison E. Steeves	1949 – 1967	
Jan V. Knost	1968 – 1979	
Ralph N. Helverson	1979 – 1980	
David P. Hubner	1980 – 1988	
Thomas L. Mikelson	1988 – 1989	
Vacant	1989 – 1994	
Lawrence E. McGinty	1994 – 1996	
Bruce M. Clary	1996 – 2005	
Vacant	2005 – 2007	
Rali Weaver	2007 – 2025	
Amelia "Mel" Shenstone	2025-present	(Note: Shenstone, a 2023 graduate of Harvard Divinity School, is a contract minister who has called to serve for at least two years while a perminant minister is called.)

=== John Allin ===
A "tender" search for the flock's first minister took several months. The selection process was not easy. John Phillips, though he was "respected and learned" and much desired, twice refused calls to become minister. He instead went to the Cambridge church where Harvard College had recently been established. Thomas Carter likewise declined the post and instead became minister in Woburn.

The "gifts and graces" of each member of the church was tested and considered for nearly two years before they settled upon John Allin. Then came the question of whether he should be called minister or pastor or something else. The opinion of other churches was requested, but they replied with indifference. Allin became known as pastor. As he held the teaching office, his role was to pray, preach, and instruct. As pastor, he was to administer baptism and other sacraments.

After selecting a pastor, the names of Ralph Wheelock, John Hunting, Thomas Carter, and John Kingsbury were put forward for the role of ruling elder. Hunting was eventually being selected, though Wheelock very much wanted the position. On April 24, 1639, a day of fasting and prayer, Hunting and Allin were ordained in the presence of the Dedham congregation and the elders of other churches. The hands of Allin, Wheelock, and Edward Allyne were laid upon Hunting during his ordination and those of Hunting, Wheelock, and Allyne were laid upon Allin for his ordination.

As in England, Puritan ministers in the American colonies were usually appointed to the pulpits for life and Allin served for 32 years.

==== Salary ====
Allin received a salary of between 60 and 80 pounds a year. Though laws of the colony required churches to provide homes for their ministers, Dedham did not. When land was divided, Allin's name was always at the top of the list and he received the largest plot.

Though Allin's salary was donated freely by members and non-members alike his salary was never in arrears, showing the esteem in which the other members of the community held him. In the 1670s, as the Utopian spirit of the community waned, it became necessary to impose a tax to ensure the minister was paid.

Towards the end of his life in 1671, Allin's health deteriorated and it became necessary to hire visiting ministers. William Woodward of Dedham was hired to assist Allin in 1668, but died in June 1669. The Town had allocated £40 as a yearly salary for the assistant preacher, but it was not paid to his brother Peter 16 years later in 1684. (Note: William and Peter were the sons of Peter Woodward.)

=== John Phillips ===
John Phillips left Cambridge at the end of 1639, and decided to come to Dedham after all. He quickly became unsatisfied in his new pulpit, however, and returned to his old church in England in October 1641.

=== William Adams ===
After Allin's death the pulpit went without a settled minister for a long stretch. William Adams, who was graduated from Harvard College two weeks prior to Allin's August 1671 death, had several connections to the town and attended Allin's funeral. By December he had already been approached several times, first by Mr. Oakes and then by Mr. Oxenbridge and Daniel Allin, to preach in Dedham. In January, Eleazer Lusher and Daniel Fisher approached him again with the same request.

He finally accepted an offer to preach in Dedham and did so on February 17, 1672. He was quite apprehensive during the morning service, but felt much more comfortable in the afternoon. On February 28, he returned home to find that Fisher and William Avery had come from Dedham to ask him, on behalf of a unanimous church, to settle in Dedham and become their minister. Adams did not give them a reply.

Given the church's rejection of the Half-Way Covenant, which the colony's clergy had endorsed, they had few options. Eventually the church would recant and accept the Half-Way Covenant With their status as an "association of renegades and philosophical outlaws" removed, they became a more attractive option for a potential minister.

In May, Lusher, Avery, and Fisher asked him again to settle in Dedham, but he again rejected the offering saying he could not find "his mind inclined to take upon me at present that work nor seeing the providence of God clearly directing me thereto." He again rejected a call in April but, after receiving the advice of some elders in September, agreed to preach on a trial basis. He finally agreed to settle there permanently in March 1673. He moved to Dedham on May 27, 1673.

Adams was ordained on December 3, 1673, and served until his death in 1685. Aside from a few minor squabbles, his time in Dedham was mostly peaceful. Just before Allin's death, it was decided to continue to pay the salary by voluntary contributions of an assessed amount. Several other votes followed in the next 16 months after it was determined that the system no longer worked. No solution was found, however, and the church was constantly behind in paying William Adams' salary. Months after he died, a committee was still trying to collect the money his estate was owed.

=== Joseph Belcher ===
The church was without a minister from 1685 to 1692. It is assumed that several young men were offered the pulpit but declined it during those years. Following his death, the congregation again rejected the Half-Way Covenant.

As a result, though a large number of preachers came on a guest basis, and even though several young men were offered the pulpit, the church could not find a minister to settle with them permanently. In May 1687, a unanimous vote of the church and the town called for Rev. Samuel Lee to settle with them, but Lee rejected. Calls were also rejected by a Mr. Bowles, a Mr. Rogers of Ipswich, Jonathan Pierpoint, and three separate calls to Nathaniel Clapp.

At the end of 1691, the congregation voted again to accept the half-way covenant and declared that Allin was right to have tried to get them to accept it. Doing so made the church more attractive to potential ministers.

Joseph Belcher, began preaching in Dedham during the spring of 1692. The records of May 23, 1692, Town Meeting indicate that "the Ch and Town have given a call" to have Belcher move to Dedham and serve as the minister. Belcher returned to preach on June 12 and did so regularly beginning on October 30. Church records indicate the call was given on December 4, 1692.

He was installed on November 29, 1693. His friend, Judge Samuel Sewall, attended his ordination. A few weeks later, on December 23, Town Meeting voted to set his salary at 60 pounds a year.

Belcher was minister at First Church from 1693 until his death in 1723, although illness prevented him from preaching after 1721. During his time as minister, a tax was instituted in Dedham to ensure his salary was paid. He tried to have the church return to a system of voluntary contributions in 1696, but it failed. By the end of his tenure his salary was 100 pounds a year plus the firewood provided by members of the parish. The town also contributed 60 pounds to build a parsonage on land now owned by the Allin Congregational Church.

In 1721 he came down with a "dangerous paralysis" and went to Roxbury to the home of his son-in-law, Rev. Thomas Walter. The church occasionally took up collections to support him during this time. Though he was unable to work, there was a custom in New England of lifetime contracts for clergy. The church would have to make do with visiting preachers while Belcher was still alive.

He died in Roxbury on April 27, 1723, and five of the "principal men" of Dedham were appointed to hire a coach to transport his body back to Dedham. The town appropriated 40 pounds to cover the expenses of his funeral and £2.4s for the "entertainment" of the men who attended his funeral and their horses. He is buried in the Old Village Cemetery. Cotton Mather read a eulogy of him in Boston.

Five of his sermons survive. One was delivered before the Great and General Court, one before the Ancient and Honorable Artillery Company, two preached in Dedham specifically for young people, and one at the ordination of Nathaniel Cotton in Bristol, Rhode Island. His portrait, donated in 1839, hangs just left of First Church's pulpit.

=== Samuel Dexter ===
Samuel Dexter preached for the first time on October 15, 1722, and was called to minister at First Church in the fall of 1723. His call was opposed by some in the community, but it was for primarily political reasons, not necessarily theological ones. He was ordained on May 6, 1724, and served until his death in 1755.

During his ministry, several outlying areas of Dedham began to establish their own churches. It was then that the church, which previously had been known as the Church of Christ, began to be called First Church in Dedham. After the churches split his ministry was "calm and quiet," but before he did there were members of the community, whom he called "certain sons of ignorance and pride," who insulted him to his face. Meetings were frequently called to correct the behavior of disorderly members and this led to an ecclesiastical council in July 1725.

=== Jason Haven ===
Jason Haven was called to the Dedham church in 1755 and ordained on February 5, 1756. As part of the call, he was offered 133 pounds, six shillings, and 8 pence in addition to an annual salary of 66 pounds, 13 shillings, and 8 pence plus 20 cords of wood. He was also granted "the use and improvement" of plot of land near the meetinghouse and given three parcels of land in Medfield, Massachusetts. There was some opposition to his call but, after 40 years of ministry, he counted those early opponents as friends.

As minister, he brought a number of young men into his household to prepare for college or the ministry; 14 of them went to Harvard College. He also oversaw the construction of the current meetinghouse in 1762. A gifted orator, he was frequently called upon to preach at ordinations and to address public assemblies. He addressed the Ancient and Honorable Artillery Company at the election of their officers in 1761 and preached a sermon before the Great and General Court in 1769. He preached the general election sermon in 1766 and the Dudleian lecture in 1789. In 1794, he preached the convention sermon.

In 1793, he instituted a new method for bringing new members into the congregation. The minister would propose an individual and, if there was no objection after 14 days, they became a member of the church.

=== Joshua Bates ===
After Haven's death, an effort was made to limit the term of the minister rather than granting him a life tenure. The next occupant of the pulpit, from 1803 to 1818, was Joshua Bates. He was first called to be the associate pastor with Jason Haven in 1802 and was ordained on March 16, 1803 "before a very crowded, but a remarkably civil and brilliant assembly." Three months later, Haven died. There were some who opposed his call, but Fisher Ames made an eloquent speech of support and this was enough to issue a call. Several members, including Fisher Ames' brother Nathaniel, left the church, however, and became Episcopalians.

During his pastorate, the Lord's Supper was administered every six weeks. On the Thursdays preceding, he would preach the Preparatory Lecture. Students in the nearby school were marched to the meetinghouse to listen to the lecture, and Bates would visit the school on Mondays to quiz students on the catechism.

Politically, he was an ardent Federalist while the town and the church were strongly anti-Federalist. His sermons often were intolerant of those whose politics who differed from his own. He believed Thomas Jefferson to be an infidel and that Jefferson's followers, including those in Dedham were at best doubtful Christians. Bates also gradually withdrew from allowing guest ministers to preach, a common and popular practice at the time. The more orthodox members of the church believed it to be supporting heresy when ministers who leaned Unitarian were invited to preach.

The anti-Federalist members of the congregation didn't like paying taxes to support hear Federalist sermons, and the liberal parishioners didn't like the exclusion of other voices from the pulpit. In 1818, Bates asked to be dismissed from the church to accept the presidency of Middlebury College. It is assumed that many in the congregation were glad to let him go. His last sermon was delivered on February 15, 1818. Bates went on to become Chaplain of the United States House of Representatives.

=== Alvan Lamson ===
Lamson's appointment as minister came shortly after he was graduated from Harvard College and three months after the resignation of Bates. On August 31, 1818, at a meeting of the parish, or the inhabitants of the town who were taxed to pay the minister's salary, Lamson was elected by an 81-44 majority. He beat out two other candidates. Members of the church opposed his election by a vote of 18-14, with six members not voting. Those who opposed Lamson did not raise any objections to his moral or professional qualifications.

After Lamson accepted the parish's call without the concurrence of the church, a council of pastors and delegates from 13 other churches was convened on October 28, 1818. After two days of hearings and deliberations, it prepared a report in favor of Lamson's ordination. Lamson was ordained by Rev. Henry Ware.

His ordination by Rev. Henry Ware. led to the case of Baker v. Fales and the split of the church into First Church and the Allin Congregational Church. Lamson attempted to reconcile with those who left and formed a new church, but was largely unsuccessful. When he visited the home of a member of the new Orthodox Church, he was seated under a birdcage. Just as the homeowner asked a difficult question, the bird splashed water on him. Lamson turned his attention to the bird, and was immediately accused of trying to dodge the question.

During his tenure, William H. Mann was the organist. (Note: Mann lived on Court Street. He also played at the St. Paul's and at the Baptist Church in East Dedham. He learned the trade of a printer and in his later years he was a bookkeeper at the Maverick Woolen Mills.)

=== Benjamin H. Bailey ===
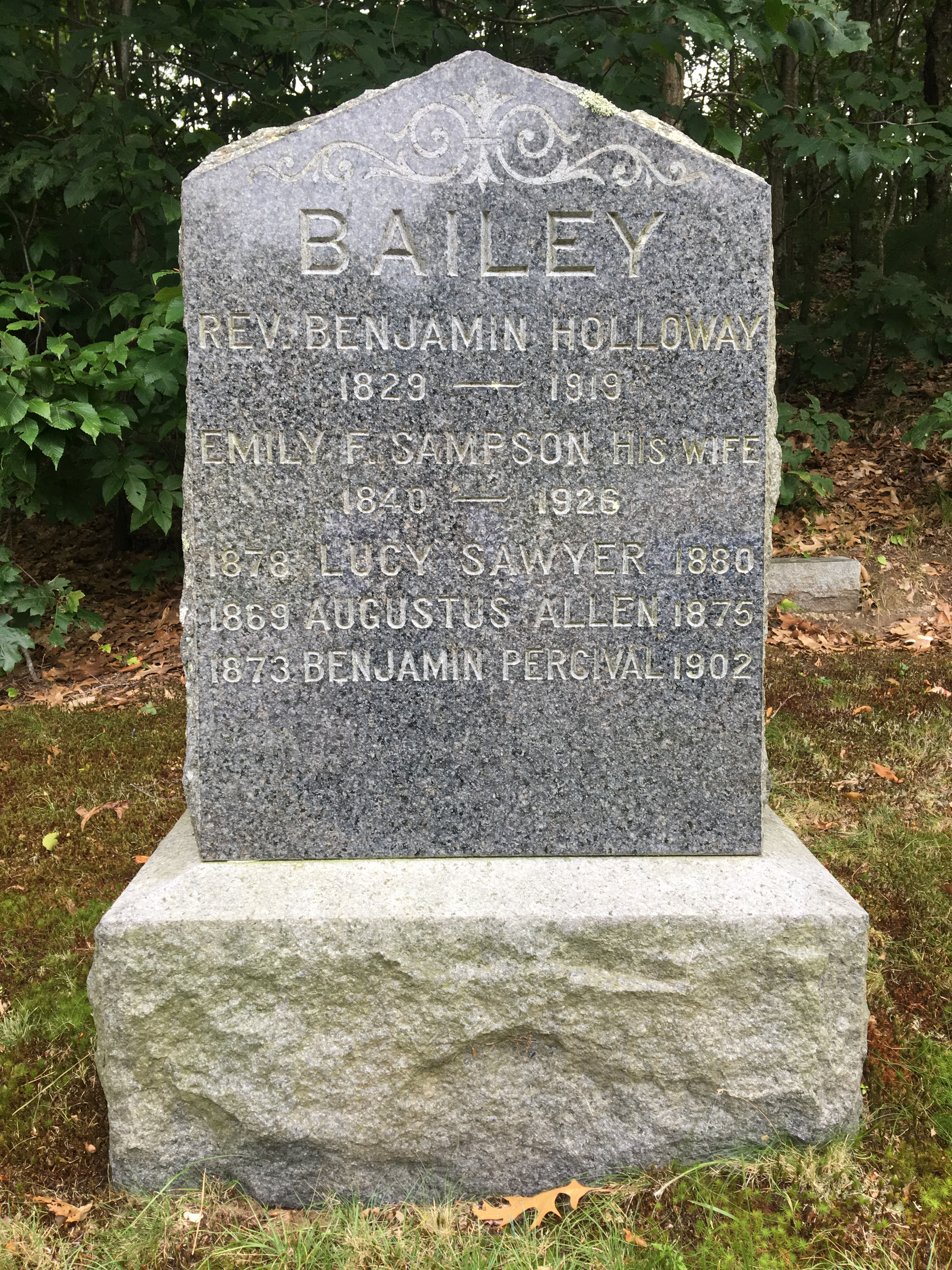
Gravestone of Rev. Benjamin H. Bailey at Brookdale Cemetery

Benjamin H. Bailey served at First Church from 1861 to 1867. In Dedham, he presided over the funeral of his predecessor, Alvan Lamson and led the service at the 250th anniversary of the church's gathering in 1888 where he delivered an historical discourse.

In 1867, he was called to Portland, Maine.

=== Rali M. Weaver ===
Rali M. Weaver, was called in March 2007, settled in July, and was the first female minister to this congregation. She left the pulpit in 2025.

== Works cited ==
- Abbott, Katharine M. (1903). Old Paths And Legends Of New England (PDF). New York: The Knickerbocker Press. pp. 290–297.
- Austin, Walter (1912). Tale of a Dedham Tavern: History of the Norfolk Hotel, Dedham, Massachusetts. Priv. print. at the Riverside Press.
- Beach, Seth C.; Sanford, Carroll; Smith, Nathaniel; Whitney, Mrs. S.W.; Maynard, Mrs. C.E.; Capen, Charles James (1878). Covenant of the First Church in Dedham: With Some Facts of History and Illustrations of Doctrine; for the Use of the Church. H. H. McQuillen.
- Brown, Richard D.; Tager, Jack (2000). Massachusetts: A concise history. University of Massachusetts Press. ISBN 978-1558492493.
- Burgess, Ebenezer (1840). Dedham Pulpit: Or, Sermons by the Pastors of the First Church in Dedham in the XVIIth and XVIIIth Centuries. Perkins & Marvin.
- Clarke, Wm. Horatio (1903). Mid-Century Memories of Dedham. Dedham Historical Society.
- Dedham Historical Society (2001). Dedham. Arcadia Publishing. ISBN 978-0-7385-0944-0.
- Knudsen, Harold M. (2025). Fisher Ames, Christian Founding Father & Federalist. Liberty Hill Publishing.
- Lockridge, Kenneth (1985). A New England Town. New York: W.W. Norton & Company. ISBN 978-0-393-95459-3.
- Worthington, Erastus (1827). The history of Dedham: from the beginning of its settlement, in September 1635, to May 1827. Dutton and Wentworth.
- Smith, Frank (1936). A History of Dedham, Massachusetts. Transcript Press, Incorporated.
- Robinson, David (1985). The Unitarians and the Universalists. Greenwood Publishing Group. ISBN 0313248931.
- Allen, William (1832). An American biographical and historical dictionary...: containing an account of the lives, characters, and writings of the most eminent persons in North America from its first settlement, and a summary of the history of the several colonies and of the United States. W. Hyde. p. 443.
- Wright, Conrad (1988). "The Dedham Case Revisited". Proceedings of the Massachusetts Historical Society. 3. 100. Massachusetts Historical Society: 15–39. JSTOR 25080991.
- Tuttle, Julius H. (1915). "A pioneer in the public service of the church and of the college". Publications of the Colonial Society of Massachusetts. 17. The Colonial Society of Massachusetts.
- Hanson, Robert Brand (1976). Dedham, Massachusetts, 1635-1890. Dedham Historical Society.
- Fisher, Phillip A. (1898). The Fisher Genealogy: A Record of the Descendants of Joshua, Anthony, and Cornelius Fisher, of Dedham, Mass., 1630-1640. Massachusetts Publishing Company. ISBN 978-0-608-32125-7.
