= Angle Tree Stone =

- U.S. National Register of Historic Places
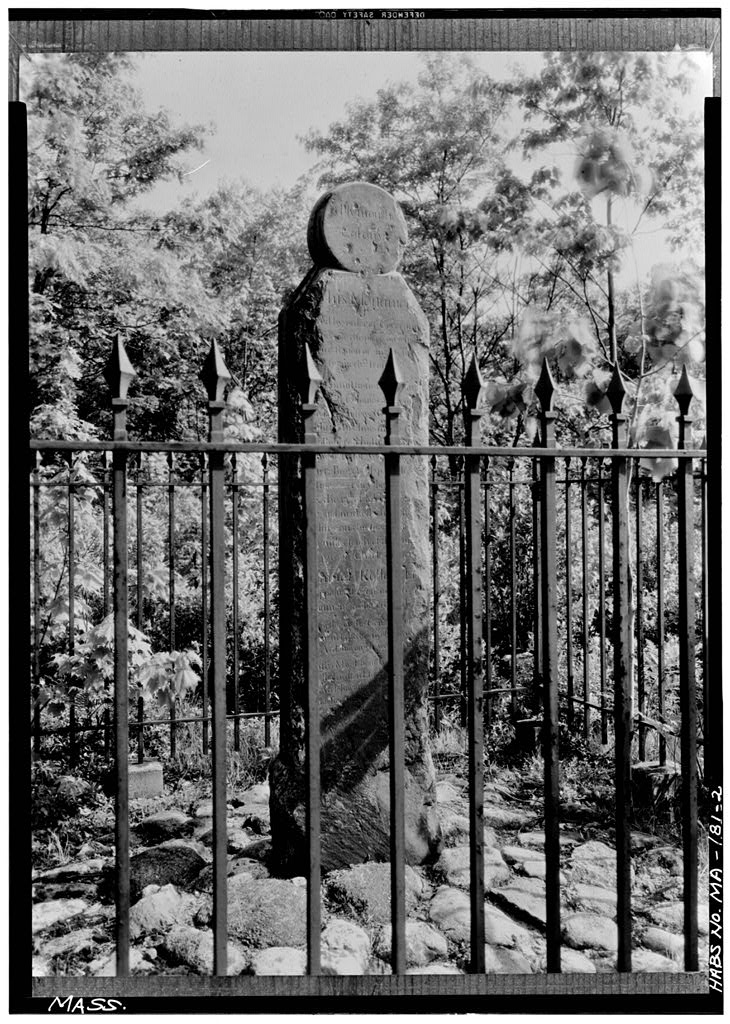

- Location within Massachusetts Location within the United States
- Nearest city: Plainville, Massachusetts
- Coordinates: 41°59′6″N 71°21′54″W
- Built: 1790
- NRHP reference No.: 76000228
- Added to NRHP: January 1, 1976

The Angle Tree Stone is a historic boundary marker astride the border of North Attleboro, Massachusetts and Plainville, Massachusetts.

== Description ==
The slate marker was built in 1790 by a father and son team of gravestone makers. The stone was added to the National Historic Register in 1976. The stone replaced the "Angle Tree" from the 17th century, which was a surveying landmark for the boundary between Bristol and Norfolk counties, and also between North Attleborough and Plainville, Massachusetts. The county border is a straight east–west line coming from Cumberland, Rhode Island to the site of the tree (now the stone) and then turning at an angle (hence the "angle tree" designation) and running in a straight line from there almost to Massachusetts Bay near Cohasset.

The Angle Tree Stone has been encased in a brick and plexiglass structure since 1985 to protect it from graffiti. It is set back 1/4 mile down a dirt access road and footpath.

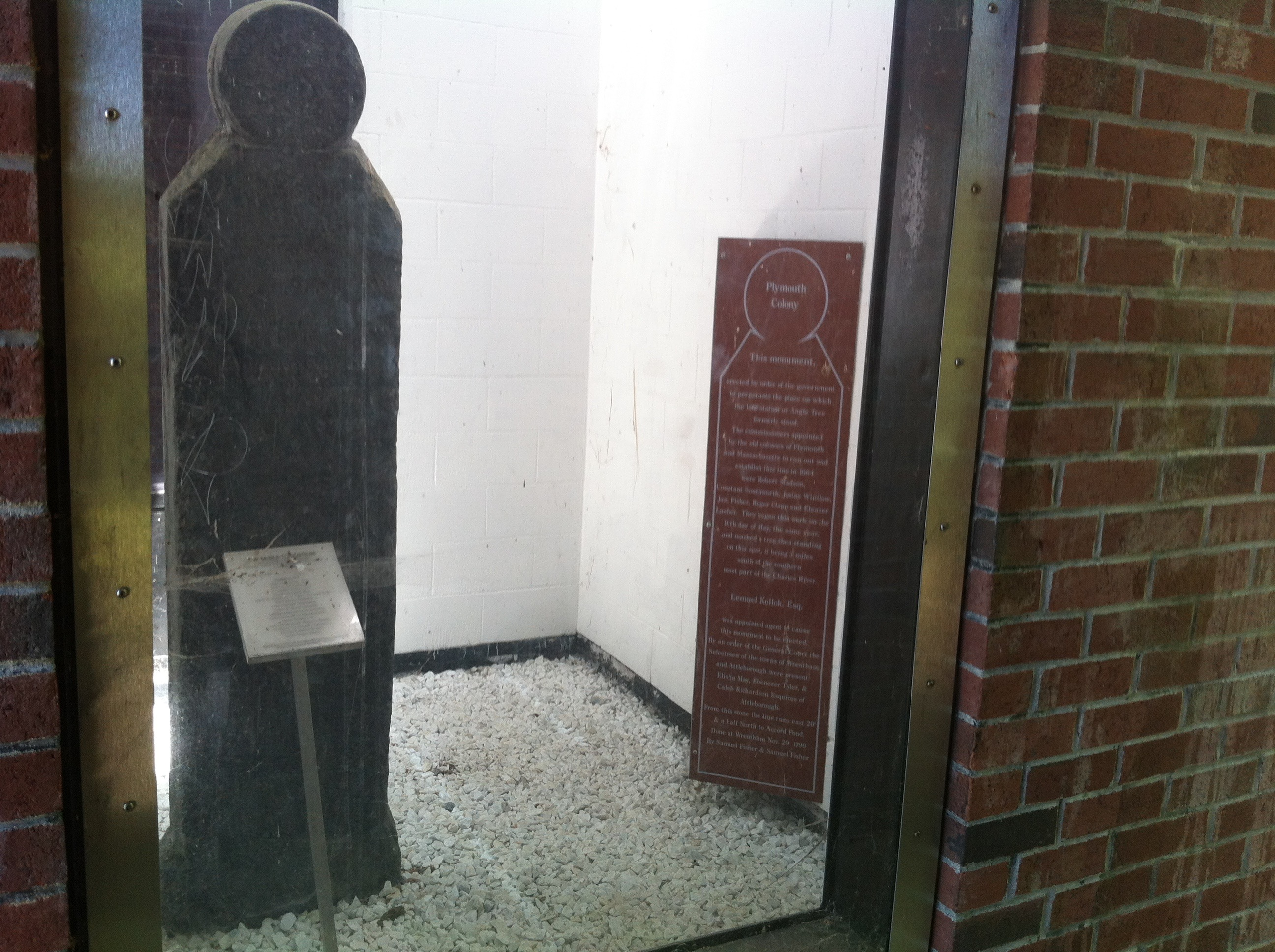
North Attleboro side of the Angle Tree Stone enclosed in display shelter. Sign to the right displays the text engraved in the stone.

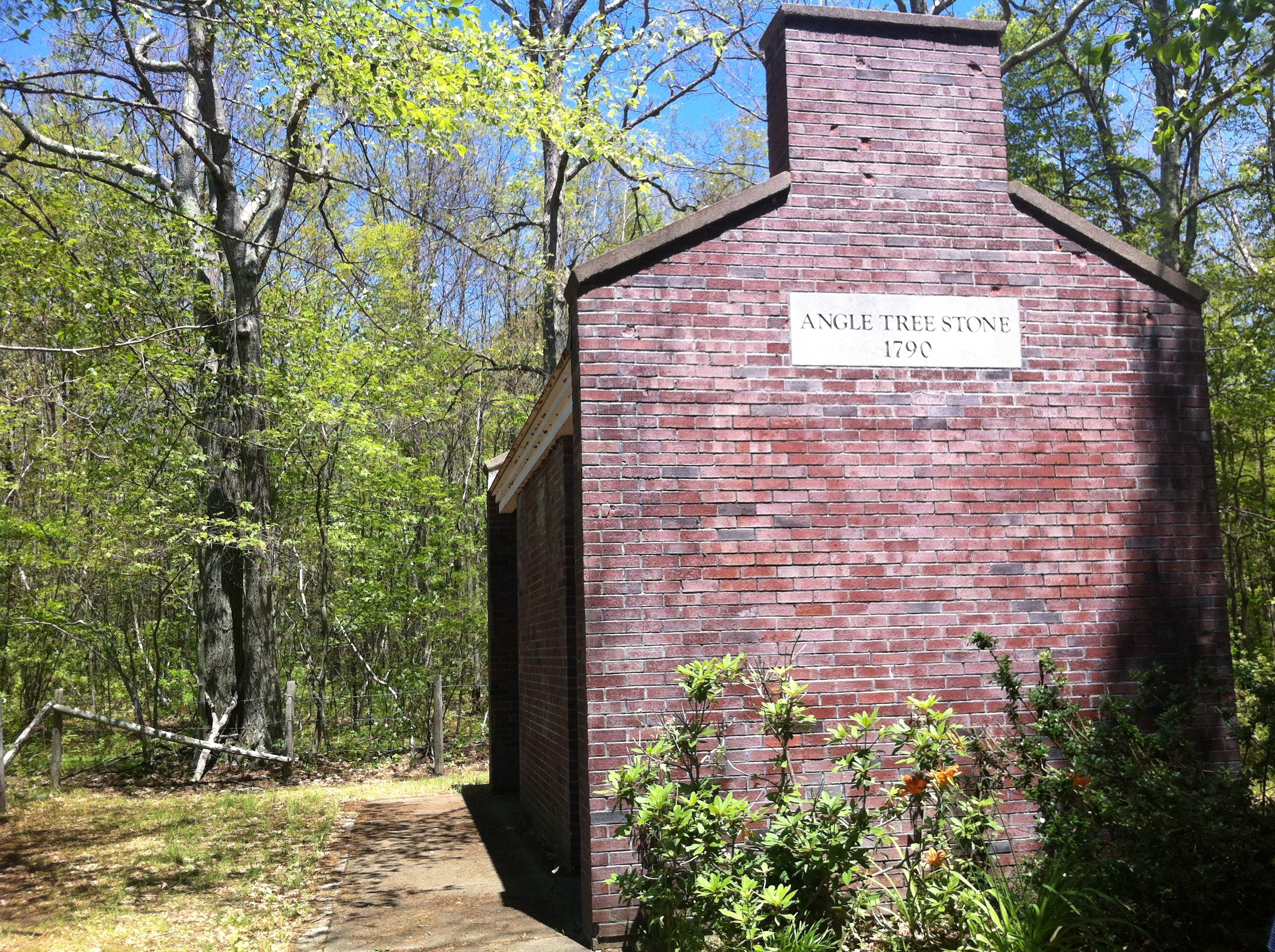
The brick shelter for the Angle Tree Stone.

In 1640, the Plymouth Colony and the Massachusetts Bay Colony had agreed that a line from Accord Pond, in Hingham, to Wrentham, Massachusetts, should be the dividing line between the colonies. It was an extremely important point because at that time the grant to Massachusetts extended to the Pacific Ocean.

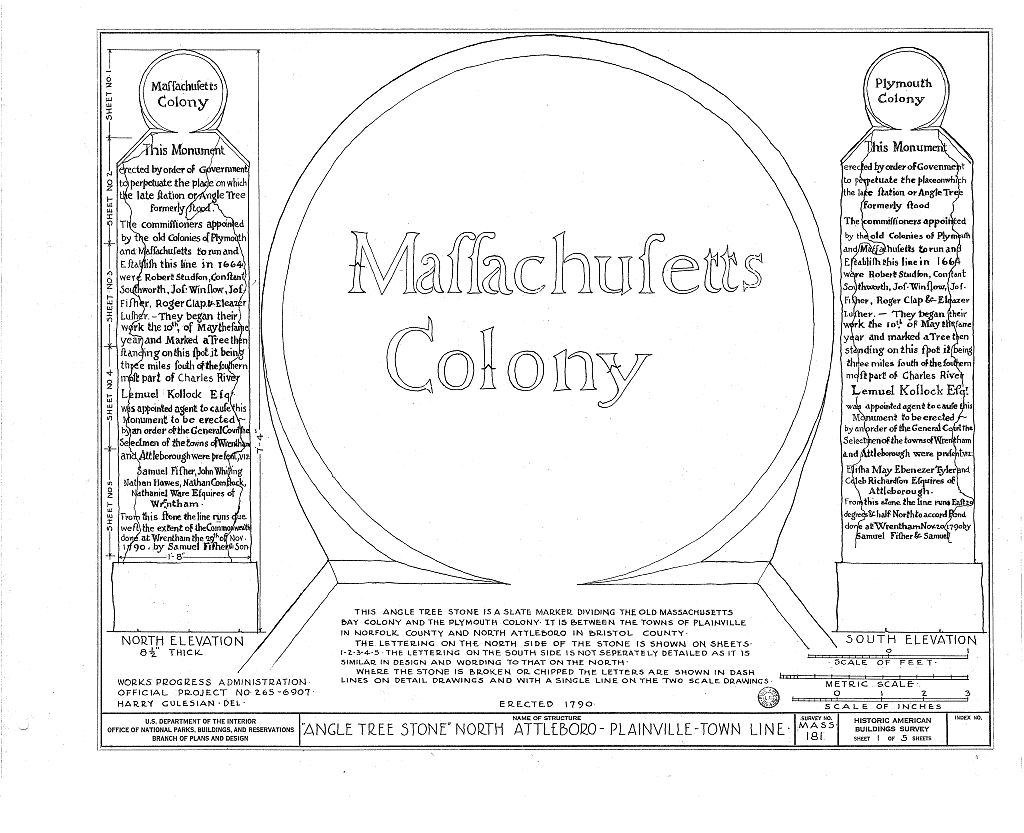
Architectural Drawing of the "Angle Tree Stone" North Attleboro - Plainville - Town Line Historic American Buildings Survey (HABS) Drawing Sheet 1

The line was often the subject of disputes and not finally settled until two U.S. Supreme Court decisions were handed down two centuries later in Rhode Island v. Massachusetts, 37 U.S. 12 Pet. 657 (1838) and 45 U.S. 591 (1846).

In the 6th Volume booklet of The Stetson Kindred of American, Inc. "Sketch of Cornet Robert Stetson" written by Nelson M. Stetson, (Robert Stetson being one of the commissioners who set the boundary line and Angletree on behalf of the Plymouth Colony), states the following: "...in the old tree died and was replaced by act of the Massachusetts legislature in 1790 with a rude stone monument since known as the ‘Angletree stone.’ The stone is marked on the north side ‘Massachusetts Colony’ and on the south side ‘Plymouth Colony’ and the following inscription is cut on both sides. ‘This monument, erected by order of the government to perpetuate the place on which the late station or angle tree formerly stood. The commissioners appointed by the old colonies of Plymouth and Massachusetts to run out and establish this line in 1664 were Robert Studson, Constant Southworth, Josias Winslow, Jos. Fisher, Roger Clapp and Eleazer Lusher. They began this work on the 10th day of May, the same year, and marked a tree then standing on this spot, it being (3) miles south of the southerly most part of Charles River. Lemuel Kollock, Esq., was appointed agent to cause this monument to be erected. By an order of the General Court of Selectmen of the towns of Wrentham and Attleborough were present, viz.: Samuel Fisher, John Whiting, Nathan Hawes, Nathan Comstock and Nathaniel Ware, Esquires of Wrentham. From this stone the line runs due west the extent of the Commonwealth. Done at Wrentham the 29th day of Nov., 1790 by Samuel Fisher and Son."

== See also ==
- National Register of Historic Places listings in Norfolk County, Massachusetts
- National Register of Historic Places listings in Bristol County, Massachusetts
