= John Phillips (Puritan) =

John Phillips was an Anglican and Puritan cleric and an eminent divine.

Phillips matriculated at Emmanuel College, Cambridge in 1594 and graduated from St. Catherine's College in 1596–97. He received a Master's of Arts from Clare College in 1600 and a Bachelor of Sacred Theology from Clare in 1608. He was named rector of Wrentham, Suffolk, in 1609 and was an eminent divine. Eleazer Lusher and Edward Alleyn were among his parishioners. Phillips married Elizabeth Ames, the sister of William Ames, on 6 January 1611–12.

In 1638 he was removed from his post as a priest of the Church of England. He twice refused calls to become minister of the First Church and Parish in Dedham. Instead, the church selected John Allin, who was married by Phillips. Instead, Phillips went to Cambridge to work at the church there and at the recently established Harvard College. He left in late 1639, however, briefly assumed the pulpit in Dedham, but then sailed back to England in October 1641.

== Works cited ==
- Lockridge, Kenneth (1985). A New England Town. New York: W.W. Norton & Company. ISBN 978-0-393-95459-3.
- Smith, Frank (1936). A History of Dedham, Massachusetts. Transcript Press, Incorporated.
- Tuttle, Julius H. (1915). "A pioneer in the public service of the church and of the college". Publications of the Colonial Society of Massachusetts. 17. The Colonial Society of Massachusetts.
- Hanson, Robert Brand (1976). Dedham, Massachusetts, 1635-1890. Dedham Historical Society.
