= Amasa Hewins =

American painter

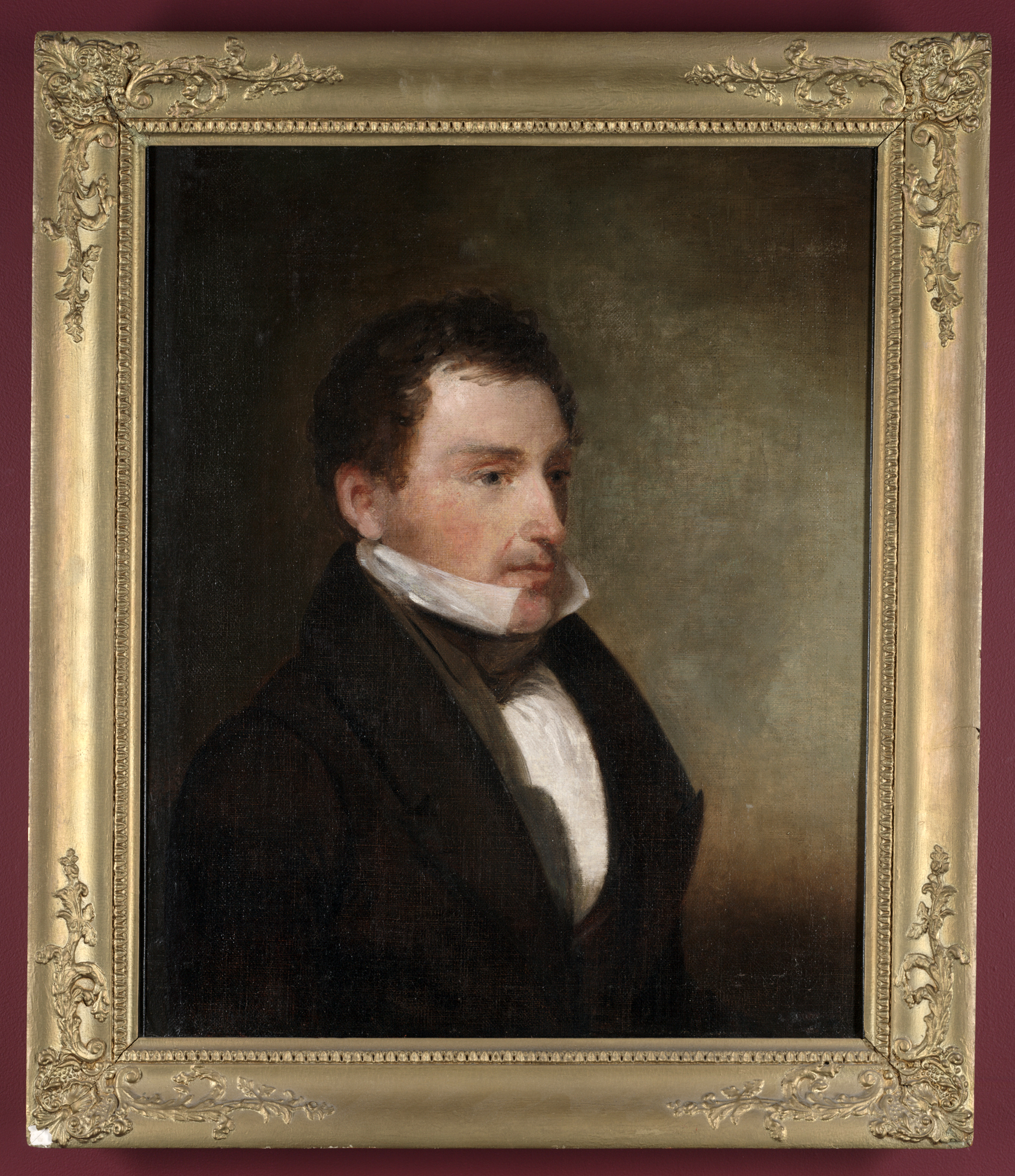
- Hewins c. 1840
- Born: July 11, 1795
- Died: August 18, 1855 (aged 60)

Amasa Hewins (July 11, 1795 – August 18, 1855) was an American portrait, genre and landscape painter. He also exported fine paintings, antiques, and objet d'art from Italy to Boston during the 1850s, selling most of it through private dealers and at auctions in New York City and Boston.

== Early and personal life ==
Hewins was born in Sharon, Massachusetts, to Esther (Kollock) and Amasa Hewins. He married Elizabeth Newell Alden on August 22, 1820, and thereafter he lived in Dedham. In 1821, Hewins was listed in the Boston business directory as a merchant in West India goods on Brattle Street in Boston, trading in rum, sugar, molasses and cotton. A year later, Elizabeth gave birth to their first child, Charles, prompting Amasa to take his younger brother Royall into business as a partner; the couple eventually had nine children.

== Career ==
An advertisement for A. Hewins, portrait painter appeared in the New York newspaper “The National Advocate” on December 6, 1824. In 1825, Hewins relocated his family to Washington City, where he offered an academy for the instruction of young Ladies and gentlemen and also held a post as Professor of Drawing at Mr. and Mrs. Bonfils Young Ladies’ Seminary, the school of his sister-in-law and her husband, until at least 1827. Returning to Boston around 1828, Hewins first exhibited at the Boston Athenaeum in 1830, and occasionally thereafter until 1846; he also exhibited at the National Academy of Design. From August 1830 to June 1833, he travelled abroad in Italy, France and England, along with American artists Horatio and John Greenough, Samuel F.B. Morse, and Thomas Cole.

In 1839, Hewins traveled to Baltimore and then to New Haven, Connecticut, where he took up residence and advertised as a portrait-painter. It was here, during the height of the Amistad Affair, that the 135-foot-long, “The Magnificent Painting of the Massacre on Board the Schooner Amistad!!” was conceived of by Hewins. It toured New England in the spring of 1840. The following year Hewins set sail for his second trip to Florence via Gibraltar; he traveled from November 1841 to August 1842. In Florence, he met with friends Horatio Greenough and Hiram Powers and made sketches for his panorama painting: “The Largest Painting in the world… Hutching’s Grand Classical Panorama of the Sea and Shores of the Mediterranean…Executed from drawings made by A. Hewins during his voyages in the Mediterranean, and his travels in Spain, France and Italy.” From June 1848 to January 1849 the Hutching's Gallery in Boston displayed Hewins's moving panorama at the Masonic Temple-Tremont Street. It traveled over the next two years and was displayed, amongst other locations, in Ohio, Albany and New York City.

In March 1852, Hewins returned to Florence, Italy where he painted and worked. In 1854 Hewins was appointed Consular General of Tuscany at Livorno; this position aided him in the exportation of Italian paintings, antiques, and objet d'art to the United States. Dying from Cholera in August 1855, Hewins was buried in the Protestant Cemetery (often called the English Cemetery). His papers are collected in the Boston Athenaeum.

== Notable paintings ==
- 1826 Portrait of Paul Alden, Dedham Historical Society, Dedham, Massachusetts
- 1826 Portrait of Rebecca Newell Alden, Dedham Historical Society, Dedham, Massachusetts
- 1835 Unidentified Woman, Fruitlands Museum, Harvard, Massachusetts
- c. 1832 Italian Landscape, Fruitlands Museum, Harvard, Massachusetts
- 1836 Lady Seated at a Work Table, Museum of Fine Arts, Boston
- 1836 Lady Playing the Piano, Museum of Fine Arts, Boston
- 1836 Lady Seated at a Table Wadsworth Atheneum, Hartford, Connecticut
- 1836 Lady Playing the Piano, Wadsworth Atheneum, Hartford, Connecticut
- 1837 Evening Song, Portland Museum of Art, Portland, Maine
- 1837 The Letter, Portland Museum of Art, Portland, Maine
- 1844 Portrait of Charles Ebenezer Richardson, Connecticut Historical Society, Hartford, Connecticut
- 1844 Portrait of General Jebediah Herrick, Farnsworth Art Museum, Rockland, Maine
- c. 1853 Interior of the Tribuna, Museum of Fine Arts, Boston

== Writing ==
- Allen, Francis H. (ed.), Hewin's Journal. A Boston Portrait Painter Visits Italy. The Journal of Amasa Hewins, 1830-1833. Boston; The Boston Athenaeum: 1931.
