= Alvan Lamson =

American cleric

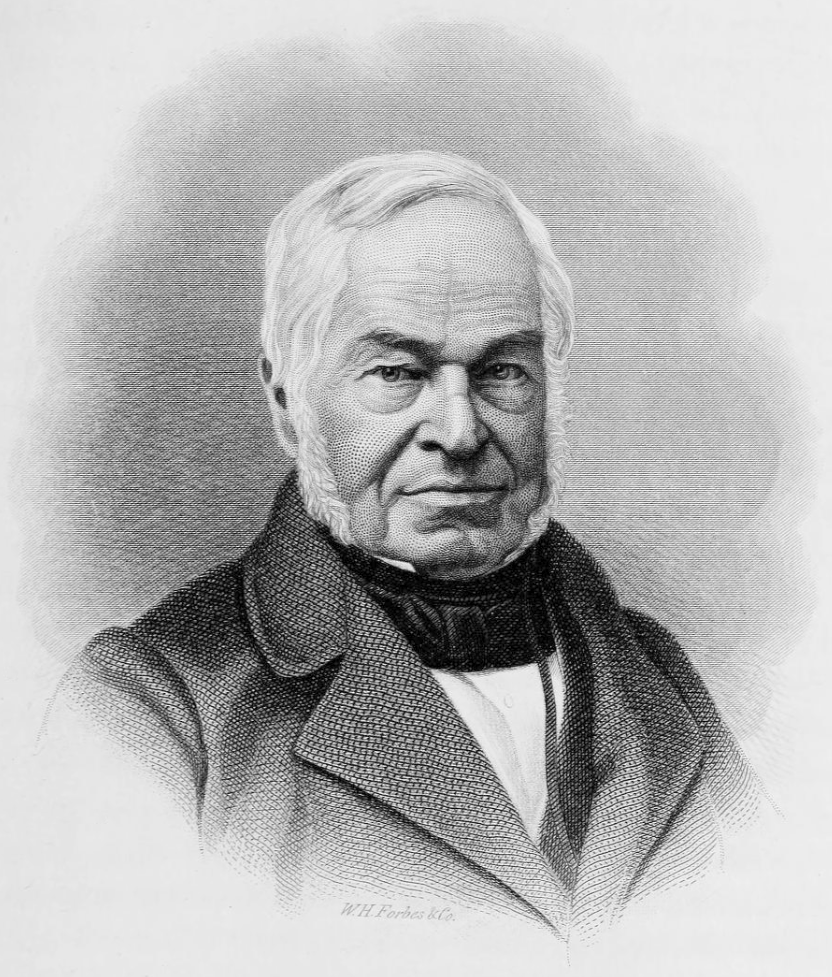
- Born: November 18, 1792; Weston, Massachusetts
- Died: July 18, 1864 (aged 71); Dedham, Massachusetts
- Education: Harvard Divinity School
- Occupation: Clergyman
- Spouse: Frances Fidelia (m. 1825)

Alvan Lamson (November 18, 1792 – July 18, 1864) was a minister at First Church and Parish in Dedham, Massachusetts. His ordination led to a split in the church and eventually a lawsuit, Baker v. Fales, that helped disestablish the church and state in Massachusetts.

== Personal life ==
Lamson was born on November 18, 1792, in Weston, Massachusetts to John and Hannah (née Ayres) Lamson. He grew up on a farm and then attended Phillips Andover. Lamson was graduated from Harvard Divinity School in 1817 and received a doctorate of divinity from Harvard in 1837.

He was a great supporter of the Dedham Public Schools and was instrumental in establishing Dedham High School. It was said of the 24 year member of the School Committee that "probably no citizen of the town ever took a deeper interest in the schools or worked harder to raise their character and standard." He organized reading circles in the parish library and engaged in editorial pursuits with other Unitarian ministers. He was a member of the Massachusetts Historical Society and the first president of the Dedham Historical Society from its establishment in 1859 to his death on July 18, 1864.

Lamson married Frances Fidelia, the daughter of Chief Justice Artemas Ward Jr. on July 11, 1825.

== Appointment ==
Lamson's appointment as minister came shortly after he was graduated from Harvard College and three months after the resignation of his predecessor, Joshua Bates. Bates was not popular with the congregation and the church itself was divided by strong religious and other opinions.

On August 31, 1818, at a meeting of the parish, or the inhabitants of the town who were taxed to pay the minister's salary, Lamson was elected by an 81–44 majority. He beat out two other candidates. Members of the church opposed his election by a vote of 18–14, with six members not voting. Those who opposed Lamson did not raise any objections to his moral or professional qualifications.

After Lamson accepted the parish's call without the concurrence of the church, a council of pastors and delegates from 13 other churches was convened on October 28, 1818. The council included Judge John Davis, Harvard President Rev. John Kirkland, future Harvard president Rev. James Walker, Rev. Henry Ware, (Note: Ware himself was the cause of a dispute between Unitarians and Congregationalists at Harvard.) Rev. Charles Lowell, and Rev. William Ellery Channing. The committee selected Channing to serve as moderator and Rev. Ralph Sanger as scribe. Rev. John Reed of Bridgewater, Kirkland, Channing, Lowell, and Davis were selected to report the findings of the council.

The council met at the Norfolk County Courthouse and heard the argument of Judge Samuel Haven, who opposed Lamson's appointment. After two days of hearings and deliberations, it prepared a report in favor of Lamson's ordination. Lamson was ordained by Rev. Henry Ware.

== Ministry ==
Lamson was ordained on October 29, 1818, and served until October 29, 1860, making his the second-longest pastorate in the history of the church.

Lamson attempted to reconcile with those who left and formed a new church, but was largely unsuccessful. (Note: His wife was less forgiving of the people of Dedham. She said "Yes, Dedham - it has the quiet of the graveyard, without its peace... People come to Dedham -- they live in Dedham -- and they go on living in Dedham-- until they no longer have the sense to leave.) When he visited the home of a member of the new Orthodox Church, he was seated under a birdcage. Just as the homeowner asked a difficult question, the bird splashed water on him. Lamson turned his attention to the bird, and was immediately accused of trying to dodge the question.

After the Allin Congregational Church ordained Ebenezer Burgess as minister, Lamson looked at him "with a meloncholy toleration, laying a great deal of his religious xenophobia at the door of an ingrained affection for all that was quaint, unique, and antiquated about the New England species of Calvinism." Burgess was openly disdainful of Lamson. Upon the death of Joel Richards, who had served as the town's undertaker, Burgess refused to share the funereal duties with Lamson even though Richards owned pews in both churches.

== Baker vs. Fales ==
In the early 19th century, all Massachusetts towns were Constitutionally required to tax their citizens "for the institution of the public worship of God, and for the support and maintenance of public Protestant teachers of piety." All residents of a town were assessed, as members of the parish, whether or not they were also members of the church. The "previous and long standing practice [was to have] the church vote for the minister and the parish sanction this vote."

In 1818 "Dedham [claimed] rights distinct from the church and against the vote of the church." When the parish installed and ordained Lamson, the more conservative or orthodox members left in 1818 decided to form a new church nearby, today known as the Allin Congregational Church.

During the split, the departing members included Deacon Samuel Fales, who took parish records, funds, and the valuable silver used for communion with him. Members of the First Church sued and the case reached the Supreme Judicial Court. The court ruled that "[w]hatever the usage in settling ministers, the Bill of Rights of 1780 secures to towns, not to churches, the right to elect the minister, in the last resort."

The court held that the property had to be returned to First Church, setting a precedent for future congregational splits that would arise as Unitarianism grew. The case was a major milestone in the road towards the separation of church and state and led to the Commonwealth formally disestablishing the Congregational Church in 1833.

== Works cited ==
- Robinson, David (1985). The Unitarians and the Universalists. Greenwood Publishing Group. ISBN 0313248931.
- Smith, Frank (1936). A History of Dedham, Massachusetts. Transcript Press, Incorporated.
- Wright, Conrad (1988). "The Dedham Case Revisited". Proceedings of the Massachusetts Historical Society. 3. 100. Massachusetts Historical Society: 15–39. JSTOR 25080991.
- Hanson, Robert Brand (1976). Dedham, Massachusetts, 1635-1890. Dedham Historical Society.
