= John Allin (Puritan minister) =

English-born Puritan cleric

John Allin, or John Allin (1596–1671), was an English-born Puritan cleric and one of the patriarchs of New England associated with the foundation of Dedham, Massachusetts.

== Biography ==
Allin was born in 1596. It is believed he was of Christ's College, Cambridge at the University of Cambridge, where he proceeded M.A. He was a classmate of George Phillips.

According to the Dictionary of National Biography, he is described "by one not given to laudation" as having been ‘a hard student, a good scholar,’ and it is added he was ‘an excellent preacher, a grave and pious divine, and a man of a most humble, heavenly, and courteous behaviour, full of sweet christian love to all.’ Nonetheless, was he exposed to the politico-religious persecutions of the times. Being ‘settled’ at St Mary-at-the-Quay Church, Ipswich, he came under the ban of Bishop Wren. He voluntarily left his ‘cure’ and removed to London, rather than be contentious.

=== To America ===
About the year 1637–8 he accompanied a band of English Puritanism to New England, ‘being obliged to go on board the ship which was to convey him thither in disguise, in order to elude pursuit.’ He was invited by the residents to settle in Dedham, Massachusetts "with thoughts of future employment in publik worke." In 1639 he was chosen pastor of the First Church and Parish in Dedham where he continued "much beloved and useful all the rest of his days," only now and again accompanying Eliot in his "labours" among the Indians. He later wrote a history of the founding of the Dedham church.

On the trip over, Allin and his companions spent much of the time in prayer meetings. When a fellow passenger attempted to fish over the railing on a Sunday, he was questioned as to why he would work on the Sabbath. He responded that he thought every day was the Sabbath as "they did nothing but preach and pray from one end of the week until the other."

=== Nine Positions ===
In 1637 a number of English divines, having had it bruited that their brethren in New England were departing from the old landmarks in regard to ecclesiastical discipline and order, addressed to them a letter of inquiry in respect to what they called the ‘Nine Positions.’ The New-England divines answered the communication at great length, frankly acknowledging that on certain points their views had been modified. This in turn was replied to by John Ball on behalf of the English divines, and to this finally a very able and pungent answer was given by Allin along with Thomas Shepard, entitled ‘A Defence of the Nine Positions.’

=== Baptism controversy ===
Later, a protracted controversy agitated New England on the proper ‘subjects’ (or objects) of baptism. Allin was foremost in the fray, and published a vigorous ‘Defence of the Synod held at Boston in the year 1662.’ He was likewise associated with Shepard in a treatise on ‘Church Reformation.’

=== Limitation of colonial allegiance ===
But Allin was more than a pastor and preacher. Though of rare patience and peacefulness, he could take a stand when called to it. Necessity was laid on him to do so very strongly and peremptorily. In 1646 an attempt which was made to bring the colonists into subjection to the British parliament produced passionate resistance. Allin was chosen to be the ‘voice’ of the colony, and he submitted a statesmanlike paper in ‘a manly and decided tone,’ marking the just limitations of colonial allegiance and imperial rights, and fully sustaining the colonists.

=== Personal life ===
He was twice married. His first wife, Margaret, went over with him to New England. They were married by John Phillips, with whom he would later share the pulpit in Dedham. Shortly after her death he married his second wife Katharine, widow of Governor Thomas Dudley. He left three sons, and all over the United States to-day families are found to trace their descent from him. He died on 26 August 1671. He is buried in the Old Village Cemetery. In 1639, he was granted land in West Dedham, which later housed the town pound.

His bereaved congregation published his last two sermons: the one from Song of Solomon viii. 5, and the other from St. John xiv. 22. In their preface the editors denominate him ‘a constant, faithful, diligent steward in the house of God, a man of peace and truth, and a burning and shining light.’ These two sermons were some years since reprinted in a memorial volume, entitled The Dedham Pulpit.

=== Mill owner ===
In 1642, John Elderkin sold half of his rights to the mill on Mother Brook to Nathaniel Whiting and the other half to John Allin, Aldis, and John Dwight. They operated the mill "in a rather stormy partnership" until 1649 when Whiting became the sole owner.

== Books authored ==
Allin authored several books, including

- A defence of the answer made unto the nine questions or positions sent from New-England, against the reply thereto by that reverend servant of Christ, Mr. John Ball, entituled, A tryall of the new church-way in New-England and in old wherin, beside a more full opening of sundry particulars concerning liturgies, power of the keys, matter of the visible church, &c., is more largely handled that controversie concerning the catholick, visible church : tending to cleare up the old-way of Christ in New-England churches / by Iohn Allin [and] Tho. Shepard ...
- Animadversions on the Antisynodalia Americana, A Treatise Printed in Old England, in the Name of the Dissenting Brethren in the Synod Held at Boston, 1662

== Legacy ==
The Allin Congregational Church was named for Allin after it split from the First Church and Parish in Dedham.

== Works cited ==
- Smith, Frank (1936). A History of Dedham, Massachusetts. Transcript Press, Incorporated.
- Worthington, Erastus (1900). Historical sketch of Mother Brook, Dedham, Mass: compiled from various records and papers, showing the diversion of a portion of the Charles River into the Neponset River and the manufactures on the stream, from 1639 to 1900. Dedham, MA: C.G. Wheeler.
