= Eleazer Lusher =

American colonial politician

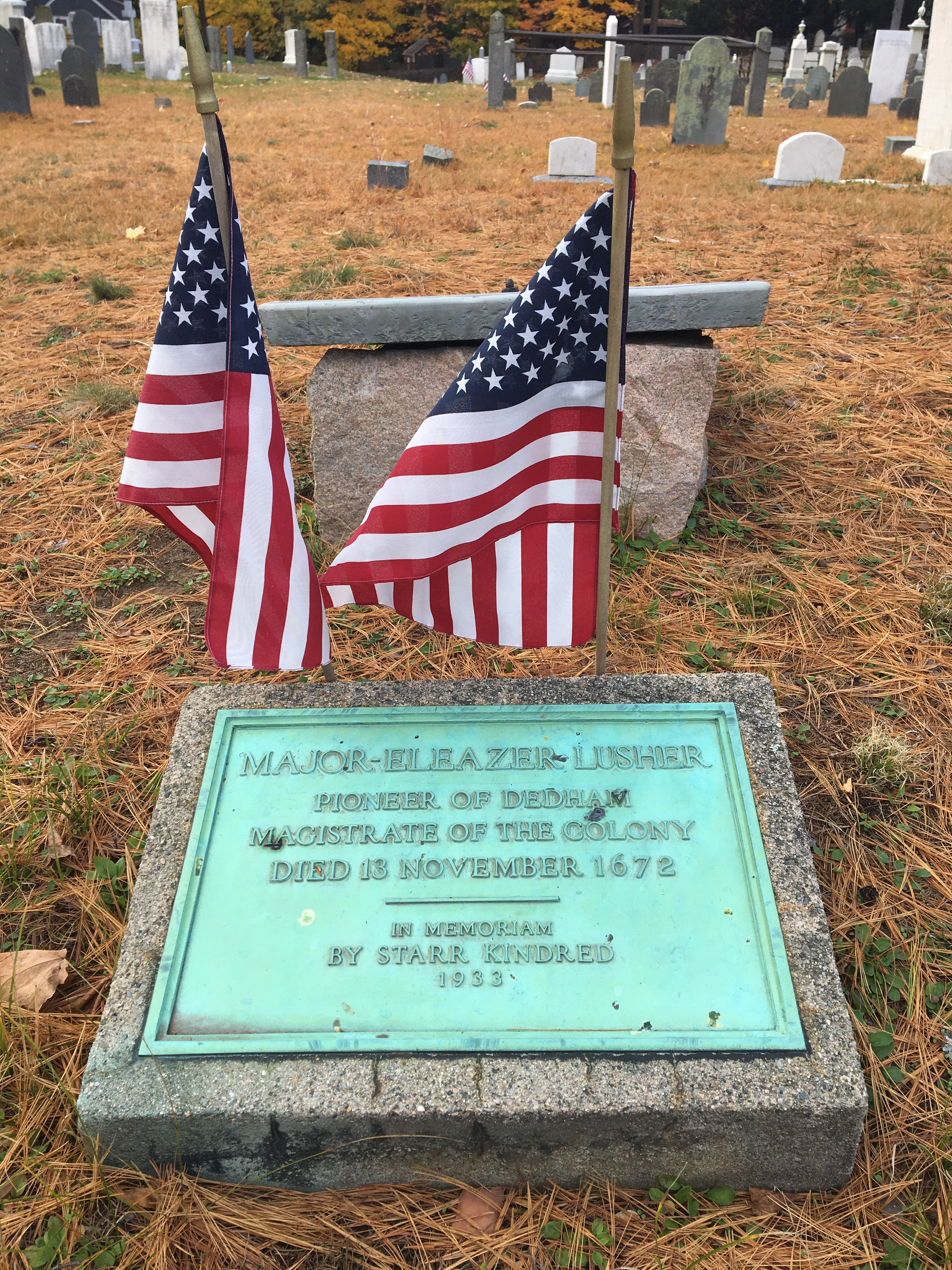
Gravestone of Eleazer Lusher

Major Eleazer Lusher (died 1672) was a politician and military leader from Dedham, Massachusetts.

== Political career ==
Lusher had unmatched political influence in Dedham and was one of the most powerful men in the Massachusetts Bay Colony. He was one of ten men, constituting five percent of the adult male population, who were reelected so many times to Dedham's seven-member Board of Selectmen that they filled sixty percent of the seats between 1639 and 1687. He served 29 one-year terms in total. He was town clerk for 23 years, having first been elected in 1641.

Lusher was also a signatory of the Dedham Covenant.

Between the years of 1650 and 1685, Lusher was one of three men elected to serve in the Massachusetts General Court. Additionally, he served on the Massachusetts Council of Assistants from 1663 to 1673. Other positions include being a diplomat, judge, and mediator. He was also on the commission that established the Angle Tree Stone. He led a trainband.

In recognition of his service, he was awarded 500 acres of land near Sudbury, Massachusetts in 1666.

== Personal life ==
Lusher, along with Joshua Fisher, owned a saw mill on the Neponset River that is depicted on the seal of the Town of Walpole, Massachusetts. Lusher was one of the eight establishing members of the First Church and Parish in Dedham.

Had he wished, Lusher "could have made a fortune" by exploiting the connections he made in the colonial government, as many others did. When he died he had a comfortable estate of 500 pounds but was not overwhelming wealthy. He is buried in the Old Village Cemetery in the tomb of Timothy Dwight.

== Works cited ==
- Lockridge, Kenneth (1985). A New England Town. New York: W.W. Norton & Company. ISBN 978-0-393-95459-3.
- Smith, Frank (1936). A History of Dedham, Massachusetts. Transcript Press, Incorporated.
- Worthington, Erastus (1827). The history of Dedham: from the beginning of its settlement, in September 1635, to May 1827. Dutton and Wentworth.
