= Dedham Museum and Archive =

Local history museum in Massachusetts, U.S.

Dedham Historical Society and Museum
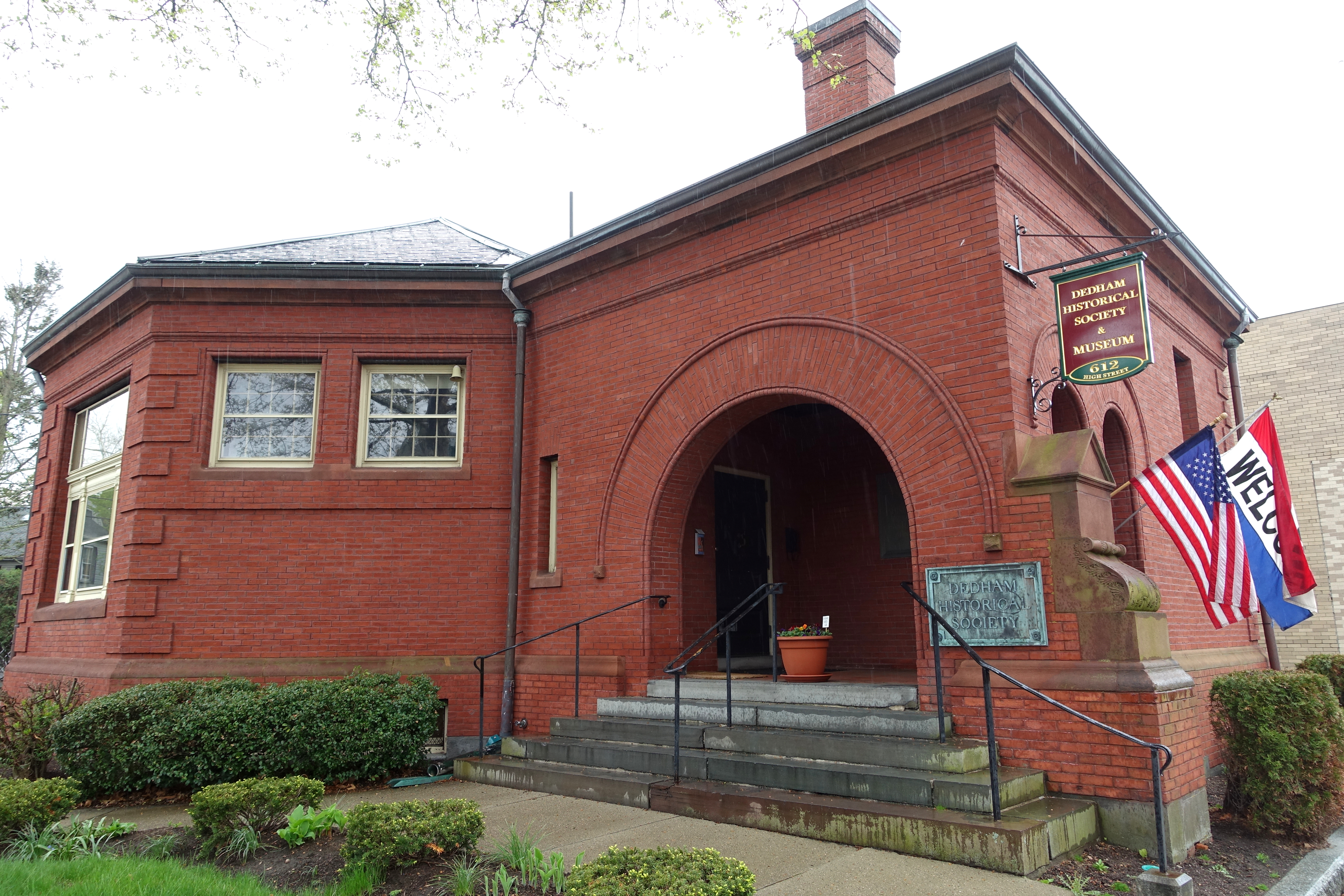
- Entrance to Dedham Historical Society building
- Founded: 1859
- Type: Educational charitable corporation
- Location: Dedham, Massachusetts
- Coordinates: 42°14′54″N 71°10′28″W
- Website: www.dedhamhistorical.org
- Formerly called: Dedham Historical Society

The Dedham Museum and Archive (formerly known as the Dedham Historical Society and Museum and the Dedham Historical Society), is a historical society dedicated to preserving and establishing a greater sense of appreciation for the history of Dedham, Massachusetts. It consists of a museum and an archive. As of 2002, it had nearly 1,000 members.

== History ==
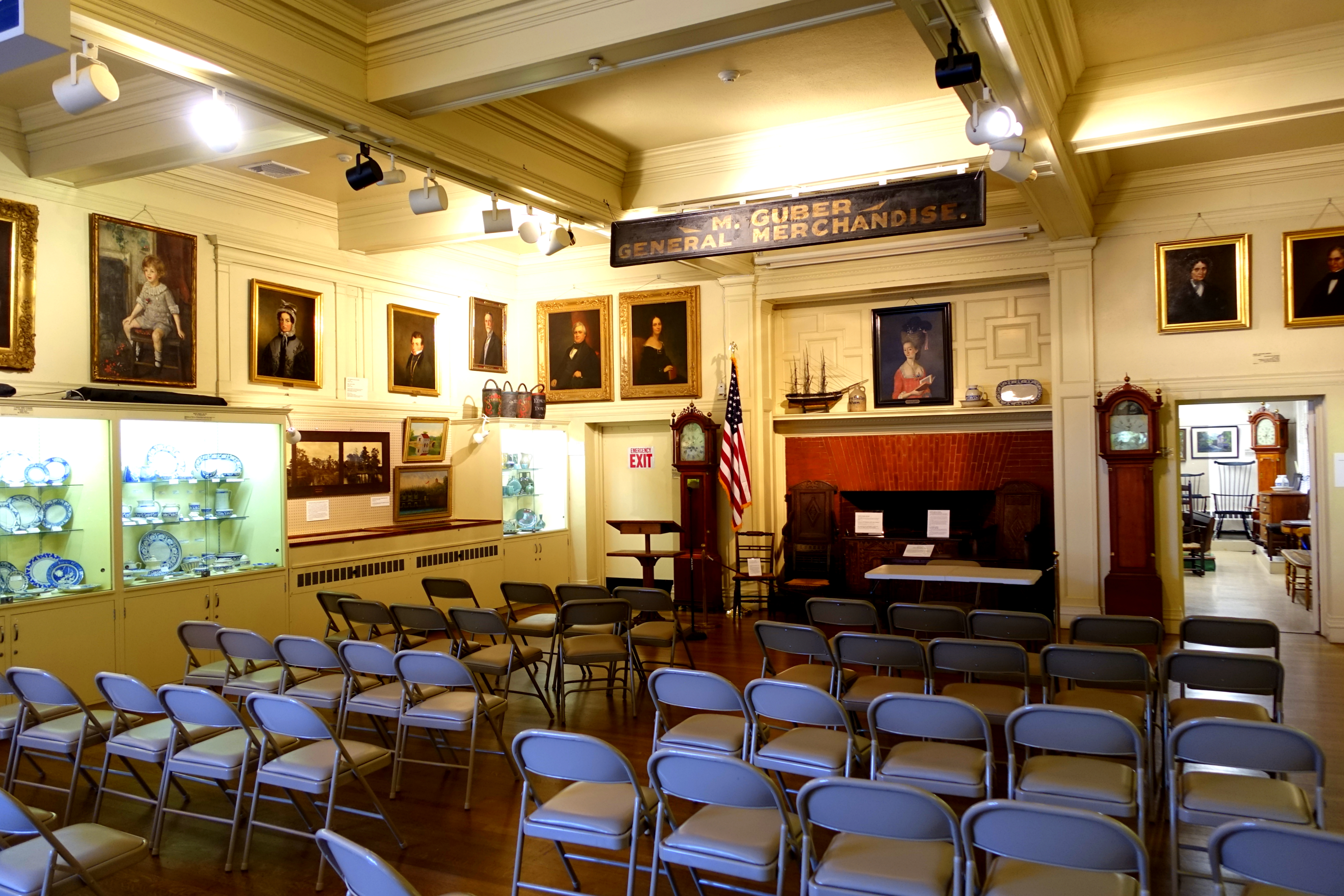
Main gallery

As early as 1853, Henry Orin Hildreth was calling for the creation of a historical society dedicated to the history of Dedham. On February 1, 1859, Hildreth, along with Calvin Guild, Danforth Phipps Wight, Jonathan Holmes Cobb, Francis Marsh, and William Bulliard met in the office of the Dedham Institution for Savings to form an organization dedicated to "preserving and transmitting to posterity all possible memorials of past and present times."

At the first meeting Wight was chosen chairman and Guild secretary. A committee was then appointed consisting of Bullard, Hildreth, and Guild to draft the Constitution and by laws. These were adopted at the next meeting, on February 15. The founders then invited 41 citizens of Dedham to join the Society, but only 22 accepted. At the end of the first year 37 members were enrolled, and by 1890 there were 147 members, including several women, the first of whom were admitted on December 1, 1886.

The first regular meeting was held on March 10, 1859, and the officers chosen were the Rev. Alvan Lamson as president, Wight as vice president, Hildreth as corresponding secretary, and Guild as recording secretary, treasurer, and librarian. Additionally, Cobb, Bullard, and Waldo Colburn were selected as curators, and Enos Foord and Henry White Richards were elected auditors. Three years later, on April 23, 1862, the Great and General Court passed an Act incorporating the Society for the “purposes of collecting and preserving such books, newspapers, records, pamphlets and traditions, as may tend to illustrate and perpetuate the history of New England, and especially the history of the town of Dedham.” The Act was accepted on the 9th day of the following June.

Before the adoption of the new by laws on March 2, 1887, quarterly meetings were held at which papers were read on subjects relating to Dedham. At a special meeting was held in the Vestry of the First Church on September 14, 1885, to celebrate the 250th Anniversary of the settlement of the town, at which time "interesting historical sketches were read by several members."

The first transatlantic direct dial telephone call took place at the Dedham Historical Society and was placed by the president-emeritus of the Society, Dr. Arthur Worthington. It connected Sally Reed in Dedham, Massachusetts to her penpal, Ann Morsley, in Dedham, Essex, in 1957. It was witnessed by Reed's teacher, Grace Hine, Dedham's former chief telephone operator of 39 years, Margaret Dooley, Selectman Arthur Lee, and several representatives of New England Telephone and Telegraph Company.

Today the Museum and Archive is a 501(c)(3) charity. The public, but not official, name of the organization was changed in 2013 to become the Dedham Historical Society & Museum.

=== Executive directors ===
There have been six executive directors since the position was established in 1982.

Director	Years
Electa Kane Tritsch	1982–1987
Greer Hardwicke	1987–1989
Robert B. Hanson	1989–1992
Ronald Forrest Frazier	1993–2009
Vicky Kruckeberg	2010-2018
Johanna McBrien	2018–present

== Building ==
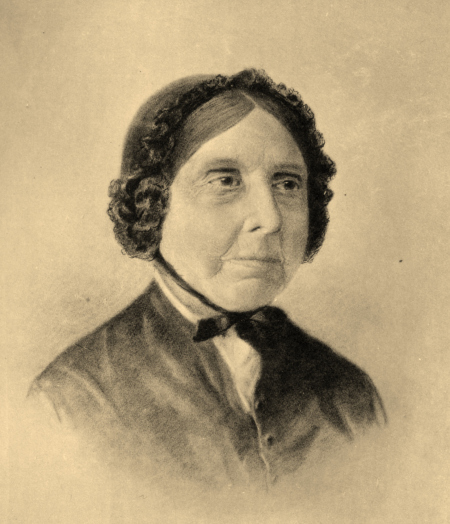
Hannah Shuttleworth

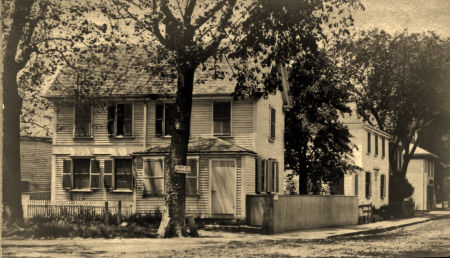
The Shuttleworth house

During the first years of the Society's existence, it did not have its own building. Until June 25, 1816, meetings were held in the office of Dedham Savings where the Society kept its small library. When the bank needed the space, other quarters were secured in the Court House basement through the friendly offer of the County Commissioners. During the following summer the library was moved to the new location where meetings were held until the erection of the present building.

On February 25, 1886, a law was passed by the General Court giving the Society the power to hold property. That same year, the 250th anniversary of the founding of the town, Don Gleason Hill announced at the Society's annual meeting in March that Hannah Shuttleworth had left the Society her home and a sum of money to construct a building. The home, which served as the first post office in Dedham under her father, Jeremiah Shuttleworth, was moved and a new building constructed. (Note: The house was moved to Bryant Street, but was torn down in the 1970s.)

Shuttleworth was a niece of Nathaniel Ames. When Ames died in 1822, he left his fortune to the unmarried Hannah, his closest living relative. Shuttleworth left $10,000 to construct the building upon her death in 1886, and members raised an additional $1,500.

The Society's new headquarters was designed by architect Edwin J. Lewis Jr., constructed by men named Woodbury and Leighton, and the construction was supervised by the curators sitting as a building committee. Construction on the Romanesque Revival building began in the fall of 1886 and was completed in December 1887. There was no formal dedication, but it opened with a notable exhibition of historical relics on January 25, 1888. The fireproof, colonial style building consisted of a lecture-display hall, basement storage area, and office space. It was described at the time as "one of the finest architectural buildings in the shire town of Norfolk."

Hill wanted to hang a portrait of Hannah in the hall to honor the great benefactor of the Society, but it was determined that no photograph or portrait had ever been taken of her. Hill then devised a plan to obtain her likeness that was "literally snatched from the grave." As he wrote in Dedham Records, published in 1888

“The morning following her funeral, a cold blustering February day, Gariboldi, the statuary manufacturer, was summoned from Boston, and inside the receiving tomb a plaster cast of her face was taken, and from this alone, with the descriptions which a few friends who knew her best could furnish, Miss Annie R. Slafter, of Dedham, made the crayon portrait which now hangs in the place of honor over the great mantel in our Historical Society room.”

The addition of a second exhibition room and more storage space in the basement was added in 1965, permitting the original basement to become a historical and genealogical library. Today the Society keeps its documents, maps, and most fragile artifacts in a fireproof climate-controlled vault. The building began a multiyear renovation in 2017.

== Library and collections ==
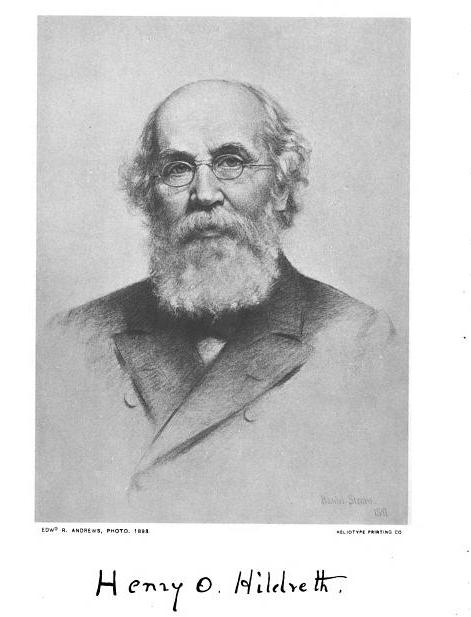
Henry Orin Holdreth

The Society's collections include Dedham Pottery, Katharine Pratt silver, paintings, photographs, pre-Columbian stone tools, local and Civil War artifacts, and a historical and genealogical library. It also has antique furniture including the Metcalf Chair, the oldest piece of American furniture, and one of only two known “astronomical shelf clocks” by Simon Willard.

It also owns the smallest bell known to have been made by Paul Revere. The bell, which dates from 1796 and cost $888, once hung in the Norfolk County Courthouse and announced the start of court sessions. It was given to the Society in 1894 by the County Commissioners.

The Society's library includes over 10,000 volumes, including old street directories, church and civil documents, yearbooks, histories, and genealogical resources. From 1886 and until it was felled in a storm in 1972, the Society owned the Old Avery Oak.

Portraits include that of John W. Thomas, Edmund Quincy, C.C. Churchill, Jerauld Newland Ezra Mann, and Henry O. Hildreth, a founder of the Society. It also holds a plaster bust of Benjamin Bussey. Other paintings include those by John Constable, Gilbert Stuart, Amasa Hewins, Henry Hitchings, and Alvan Fisher.

Hill, who also served as a trustee of the Dedham Public Library for 19 years, spent much of his presidency gathering a library of several thousand volumes. On the 21st of March, 1864 the library contained 68 bound volumes, a large collection of pamphlets, and a small number of newspapers and manuscripts.

Epitaphs in the Old Burial Place, Dedham, Massachusetts book publish by the Dedham Historical Society in 1888

By 1890 there are about 2,000 volumes, comprising standard works on American history, histories of towns in New England, especially Massachusetts, and genealogies. It also contained a large number of pamphlets, portraits, maps, articles of ancient furniture, and relics. Most were acquired in the years 1887–1890.

=== Dedham Storytellers ===
In 2017, the Dedham Storytellers initiative was founded as a collaboration between students in Michael Mederios' history class at Dedham High School, the Dedham Rotary Club, the Dedham Historical Society, the Dedham Council on Aging, and the Dedham High School Alumni Association. Students interviewed senior citizens who grew up in Dedham over a series of three lunches and a trip to the Historical Society. They then wrote three essays: an autobiography, a biography of the senior citizen they interviewed, and an essay about how their lives compare to those who grew up in town generations earlier. In 2025, the fifth collection of essays, which is stored at the Historical Society, was produced.

== Publications ==
In 1883, the first publication of the Society was issued entitled A Plan of Dedham Village. It contained the record of the original allotments of land in the centre and upper villages and a heliotype of the plan made by Henry Sylvester Talbot, facts for which were collected by William Billiard and assisted by the late Judge Colburn. The original plan was given to the Society by Bullard on June 9, 1862.

In their annual report in 1890, the curators announced that they were preparing to publish the first issue of the Dedham Historical Register. The Register would be published quarterly from 1890 to 1903. Long articles were often broken up and serialized. The quarterly pamphlets were bound together bi-annually, and at a later date were published in 14 volumes.

== See also ==
- List of historical societies in Massachusetts

== Works cited ==
Dedham Historical Society (2001). Dedham. Arcadia Publishing. ISBN 978-0-7385-0944-0.
