= 7 South Stone Mill Drive =

Building in Dedham, Massachusetts, United States

Coordinates: 42.24548°N 71.15127°W

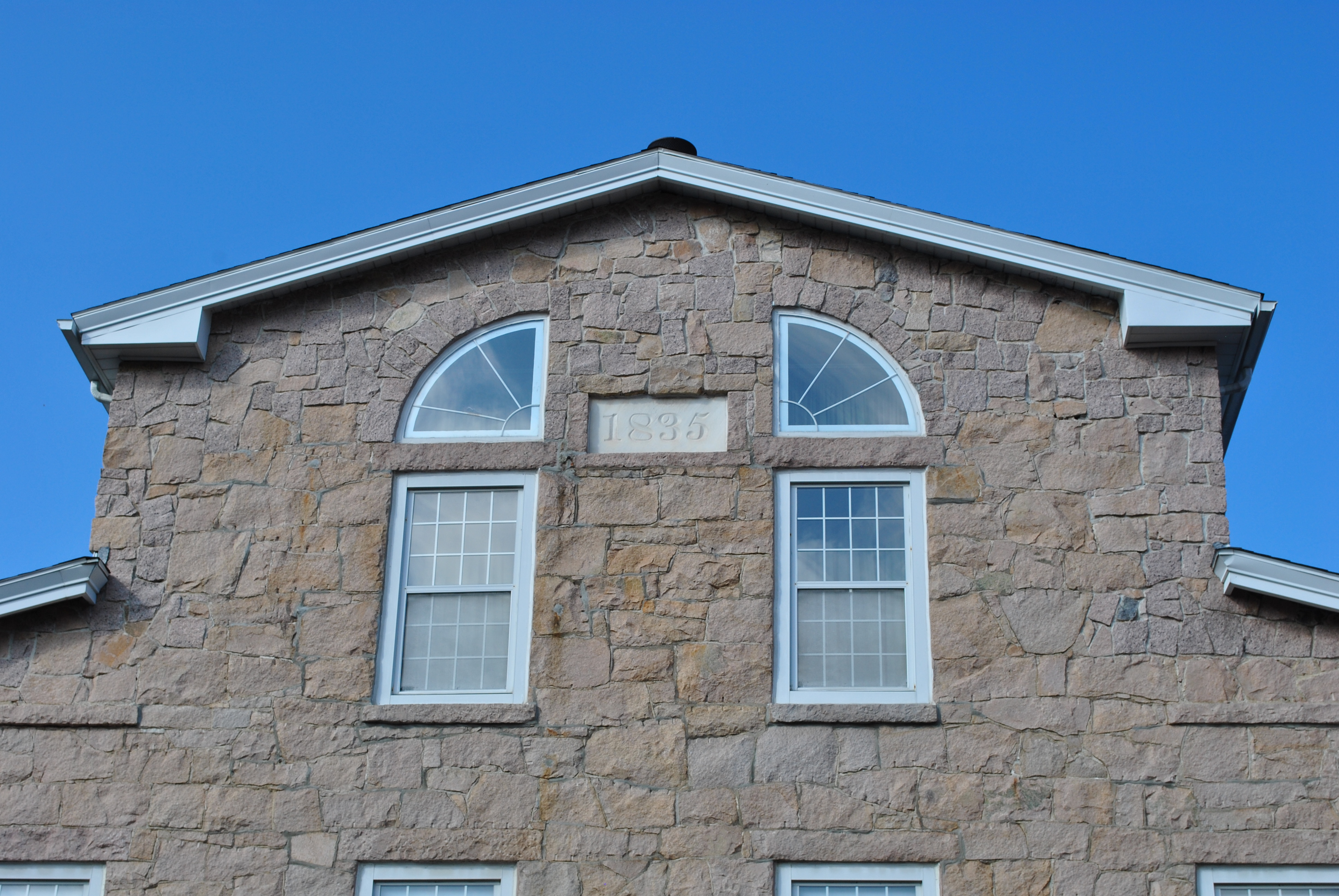
Detail of Stone Mill condo showing "1835" stone

7 South Stone Mill Drive is a condominium complex built out of Dedham Granite. Before being converted into residential use in the 1980s, it was a Mother Brook mill that made a variety of products.

== History ==
The building is located at the fourth privilege on Mother Brook and was used to make a variety of products in the 19th century, including copper cents, paper, cotton, wool, carpets, and handkerchiefs. In the 1780s another mill, connected by the same wheel, was constructed on the site to produce wire for the new nation's nascent textile industry. The first mill on this site burned in 1809, but was rebuilt with a new raceway and foundation.

The second mill began producing nails in 1814, and five years later its owner, Ruggles Whiting of Boston, sold it to the owner of the first mill, George Bird, who began using the whole site to manufacture paper. In 1823 it switched to cotton, using the machinery of the former Norfolk Cotton Company. In 1835 a new stone mill was erected. It stands today, and was converted into a condominium complex in 1986–87. Unlike the other mills, which were constructed in a strictly utilitarian style, this factory boasted a date stone reading "1835" and a dome-roofed cupola over the mill bell. Together they stood as a testament to the primacy of the mills in the neighborhood.

The mill at the fourth privilege, under the ownership of Bussey and with his agent, George H. Kuhn, was among the first to install water-powered broad looms. The looms enabled raw wool to enter the mills, be spun into thread, and then weaved into finished fabric, all under a single roof.

=== Fires ===
During the lunch break at the Cochrane Mill, a fire broke out on April 4, 1911 that quickly engulfed the mill. There were 25 employees inside, including one who was taking a nap.

Another fire broke out in the mill on May 2, 1984. This time, the mill was owned by the United Waste Company.

=== Chronological chart ===
Year	Owner	Manager	Product	Notes	Image
1832	John Lemist and Ezra W. Taft	In 1835, the stone mill which now stands upon the site was erected using Dedham Granite and was supplied with new machinery for the manufacture of cotton goods. The original building stood three stories high and measured 100' long by 40' wide. It had a gable roof with a clerestory monitor that brought light into the attic. The stone bell tower was capped with columns supporting a domed cupola. The Corporation prospered under Mr Taft's management. By the middle of the century it was producing 650,000 yards of cotton a year. Ezra W. Taft continued to be the agent and manager of the corporation for about 30 years. An unused building nearby was used by Edward Holmes and Thomas Dunbar beginning in 1846 for their wheelwright business using steam power. Taft's paper mill burned on July 17, 1846.			
~1835	James Reed and Ezra W. Taft				
1863	Thomas Barrows		Wool	Barrows enlarged the mill and installed turbines and a steam engine.	
1872	Merchants Woolen Company		Wool		
1875	Royal O. Storrs and Frederick R. Storrs		Wool	Went out of business	
1882	Merchants Woolen Company		Wool		
1894	J. Eugene Cochrane		Carpets and handkerchiefs	Third and fourth privileges under common ownership	
1897	Cochrane Manufacturing Company	Norfolk Mills	Carpets and handkerchiefs	Third and fourth privileges under common ownership	Map showing the mill from 1903
After 1917	Closed				Map showing the mill from 1917
Before 1927	United Waste Company		Wool, reclaimed fabric, and cloth recycling	This was the final industrial use of the property.	
1930s	United Waste Company		Shoddy wool	This was the final industrial use of the property.	
1986	Bergmeyer Development Co.	Re-purposed for 86 condominiums (Note: The general contractor was the Kaplan Corp., the landscape architects was Weinmayr Associates, and the financing was provided by the Mutual Bank.)		Purchase price was $1.6 million. A 25' waterfall runs through the complex. Fires burned various sections of the complex in the 1980s.	
Present day	Stone Mill Condominiums				Mother Brook with Stone Mill Condos Centennial Dam and Stone Mill condos Stone Mill condos

== Works cited ==
- Clarke, Wm. Horatio (1903). Mid-Century Memories of Dedham. Dedham Historical Society.
- Davison (1948). Davison's Textile Blue Book: United States and Canada. Vol. 84. Davison Publishing Company.
- Dedham Historical Society (2001). Images of America: Dedham. Arcadia Publishing. ISBN 978-0-7385-0944-0.
- Hurd, Duane Hamilton (1884). History of Norfolk County, Massachusetts: With Biographical Sketches of Many of Its Pioneers and Prominent Men. J. W. Lewis & Company.
- Hanson, Robert Brand (1976). Dedham, Massachusetts, 1635-1890. Dedham Historical Society.
- Neiswander, Judith (2024). Mother Brook and the Mills of East Dedham. Damianos Publishing. ISBN 978-1-941573-66-2.
- Tritsch, Electa Kane (1986). Building Dedham. Dedham Historical Society.
- Worthington, Erastus (1900). Historical sketch of Mother Brook, Dedham, Mass: compiled from various records and papers, showing the diversion of a portion of the Charles River into the Neponset River and the manufactures on the stream, from 1639 to 1900. Dedham, MA: C.G. Wheeler.
