= Population of Dedham, Massachusetts =

The population of Dedham, Massachusetts has grown from just a few families in 1636 to more than 20,000 in the 21st century.

== 1600s ==
On June 3, 1637, Ruth Morse was the first child born in Dedham to white parents, John and Annis.

The average population during the 1600s was about 500 people making slightly larger than the average English village during the same time period. With people moving either in or out of town, nearly all growth came from births and all declines through deaths. The average age for first marriages was 25 for men and 23 for women, in contrast to the European average of 27 for men and 25 for women. Younger marriages resulted in more births. There were fewer deaths as well, partially due to Dedham being spared disease, famine, and extreme climate events that ravaged parts of Europe during this time.

By the 1650s, a variety of types of men were living in Dedham, including bachelors, family men, the well-to-do, and servants. Some bought land in town but never settled there, some left soon after arriving, either to other towns or back to England, and a few died before they could do much of anything.

== 1700s ==
Dedham remained largely autonomous and cohesive community throughout the 1700s. By the mid-1700s, the town was much the same as it had been in the late-1600s. As the century moved on, however, there was an increase in the number of people moving to town from about 700 in 1700 to roughly 2,000 by 1801.

In 1728, a majority of residents, which had thirty family names between them, could trace their ancestors back to 1648. Only 13 of the 57 names on the rolls in 1688 disappeared in the next 40 years. Of the 31 new names that appeared, most were single men. By the middle of the century, most could trace their ancestors back to those who lived in town before King Phillip's War.

In the years leading up to 1736, and especially those following them, economic opportunities were growing in Dedham and the surrounding area. This brought more people into contact with those from outside Dedham's borders. More residents were also finding spouses in surrounding communities than before. Prior to 1705, only three boys from Dedham earned degrees from Harvard College. By 1737, 11 more would do so.

== 1800s ==
The population grew dramatically in the 19th century, particularly after the Civil War, largely by immigrants seeking work in the mills along Mother Brook. They brought new ideas, customs, and languages to a town that had been relatively static since its inception in 1636.

== 2000s ==
As of the census of 2020, there were 23,464 people, 8,654 households, and 6,144 families residing in the town. The population density was 2,415.6 inhabitants per square mile (932.7/km^{2}). There were 10,885 housing units at an average density of 852.2 per square mile (329.0/km^{2}). The racial makeup of the town was 82.04% White, 5.1% Black or African American, 0.00% Native American, 1.87% Asian, 0.04% Pacific Islander, 0.80% from other races, and 6.8% from two or more races. 7.5% of the population were Hispanic or Latino of any race. As of 2024, the most common ethnic groups are those of Irish or Italian heritage, with many descended from those who came to work in the mills along Mother Brook. The largest religious group are Catholics.

There were 8,654 households, of which 30.1% had children under the age of 18 living with them. 56.3% were married couples living together, 11.1% had a female householder with no husband present, and 29.0% were non-families. 23.9% of all households were made up of individuals, and 10.4% had someone living alone who was 65 years of age or older. The average household size was 2.61 and the average family size was 3.14.

Dedham's population was spread out, with 22.2% under the age of 18, 5.8% from 18 to 24, 31.1% from 25 to 44, 24.2% from 45 to 64, and 16.6% who were 65 years of age or older. The median age was 40 years. For every 100 females, there were 93.4 males. For every 100 females age 18 and over, there were 92.0 males.

The median income for a household in the town was $61,699, and the median income for a family was $72,330. Males had a median income of $46,216 versus $35,682 for females. The per capita income for the town was $28,199. About 3.2% of families and 4.6% of the population were below the poverty line, including 3.9% of those under age 18 and 6.5% of those age 65 or over.

== Religion ==
Religious affiliation in Dedham, Massachusetts, 1980–2010
Religion	1980	1990	2000	2010
Catholic	50.14%	54.67%	58.58%	52.97%
Mainline Protestant	13.34%	7.3%	6.18%	4.93%
Evangelical Protestant	.85%	1.88%	1.45%	1.69%
Orthodox Christian	n/a	n/a	1.16%	.53%
Other	1.27%	6.88%	7.13%	4.56%
Unaffiliated	34.39%	29.28%	25.52%	35.33%

== Chart ==
Historical population

Year	Pop.
1637	31 men, plus their families
1640	>200
1648	~400
1651	~100 families
Late 1650s	150+ men, plus others
1666	83 legal voters
1686	>600
1700	700–<750 (Note: In 1711, there were 45 families living north of the Charles River.)
1736	1,200
1750	1,500–1,600
1761	<1,900
1765	1,919
1775	>2,000
1790	1,659
1800	1,973

Year	Pop.
1801	2,000
1830	3,057
1837	3,532
1850	4,447
1860	6,330
1865	7,198 (Note: 27% of the population was foreign-born, and 75% of them were from Ireland. The other 25% were German-speaking.)
1870	7,342
1880	6,233
1888	6,641 (Note: In 1880, the population of East Dedham was 3,600.)
1890	7,123
1892	>7,000
1895	7,211
1899	6,641 (Note: The population decreased in 1897 when Westwood separated and became its own town. The proportion of foreign-born residents then grew to more than 28%.)
1900	7,457
1908	7,774

Year	Pop.
1910	6,641
1915	9,284
1920	10,782
1930	11,043
1940	15,136
1950	15,508
1960	18,407
1970	23,869
1980	26,938
1990	25,298
2000	23,782
2002	23,378
2010	24,729
2020	25,364
2023	24,968

== Works cited ==
- Free Public Library Commission of Massachusetts (1908). Report of the Free Public Library Commission of Massachusetts. Secretary of the Commonwealth.
- Hanson, Robert Brand (1976). Dedham, Massachusetts, 1635-1890. Dedham Historical Society.
- Lockridge, Kenneth (1985). A New England Town. New York: W.W. Norton & Company. ISBN 978-0-393-95459-3.
- Knudsen, Harold M. (2025). Fisher Ames, Christian Founding Father & Federalist. Liberty Hill Publishing.
- Massachusetts Board of Library Commissioners (1899). Report of the Free Public Library Commission of Massachusetts.
- Neiswander, Judith (2024). Mother Brook and the Mills of East Dedham. Damianos Publishing. ISBN 978-1-941573-66-2.
- Smith, Frank (1936). A History of Dedham, Massachusetts. Transcript Press, Incorporated.
- Worthington, Erastus (1827). The History of Dedham: From the Beginning of Its Settlement, in September 1635, to May 1827. Dutton and Wentworth. pp. 106–107.
