= Ezra Morse =

American mill owner (1643-1697)

Ezra Morse (1643-1697) was an early resident of Dedham, Massachusetts and owned the second mill on Mother Brook.

== Personal life ==
He was born in 1643 to Joseph Morse and was the grandson of Samuel Morse. He died in 1697. He married Joanna Hoare and together they had eight children: Ezra, Joanna, John, Nathaniel, David, Peter, David, and Seth.

Around 1678, he built the first house in what would become Norwood. Seven generations of his family would live in the home until George Morse, one of his descendants, knocked it down and built a new house at 1285 Washington Street.

== Mills ==
In January 1653 the Town of Dedham offered land to Robert Crossman if he would build a mill on the Charles where Abraham Shaw had originally intended to do so. Crossman refused, but Nathaniel Whiting, who owned the only mill in town, was so displeased by the prospect of a second mill that he offered to sell his mill back to the Town for 250 pounds. Whiting's poor performance did not improve, however, and the town wanted an alternative. Daniel Pond and Ezra Morse were then given permission by the Town to erect a new corn mill on the brook above Whiting's, so long as it was completed by June 24, 1665.

Whiting was upset by the competition for both water and customers and, "never one to forgive and forget, Whiting made something of a crusade of opposition" to the new mill. Records show that the Town spent "considerable time" trying to resolve the issue. (Note: The third paragraph of the Town Covenant stated: "That if at any time differences shall rise between parties of our said town, that then such party or parties shall presently refer all such differences unto some one, two or three others of our said society to be fully accorded and determined without any further delay, if it possibly may be.") After meeting with the Selectmen, both agreed to live in peace and not interfere with the business of the other. Two years later Morse was instructed to not hinder the water flow to such an extent that it would make milling difficult for Whiting.

The Town resolved that "in time of drought or want of water, the water shall in no such time be raised so high by the occasion of the new mill, that the water be thereby hindered of its free course or passage out of the Charles River to the mill. The proprietors of the old mill are at the same time restricted from raising the water in their pond so high as to prejudice the new mill by flowage of backwater." At the same time, Whiting was also told to repair leaks in his own dam before complaining about a lack of water.

Trouble and disputes, including a lawsuit, continued between the two until 1678 when Town Meeting voted not to hear any more complaints from Whiting. In 1699, the Morse dam at present day Maverick Street was removed, and Morse was given 40 acres of land near the Neponset River at Tiot in compensation. This seems to have been Morse's idea. He would go on to open a new mill there, in what is today Norwood, Massachusetts, next to a sawmill that opened in 1644.

== Works cited ==
- Hanson, Robert Brand (1976). Dedham, Massachusetts, 1635-1890. Dedham Historical Society.
- Worthington, Erastus (1900). Historical sketch of Mother Brook, Dedham, Mass: compiled from various records and papers, showing the diversion of a portion of the Charles River into the Neponset River and the manufactures on the stream, from 1639 to 1900. Dedham, MA: C.G. Wheeler.
- Lamson, Alvan (1839). A History of the First Church and Parish in Dedham, in Three Discourses. Herman Mann.
