= J. Wiley Edmands =

American politician

John Wiley Edmands
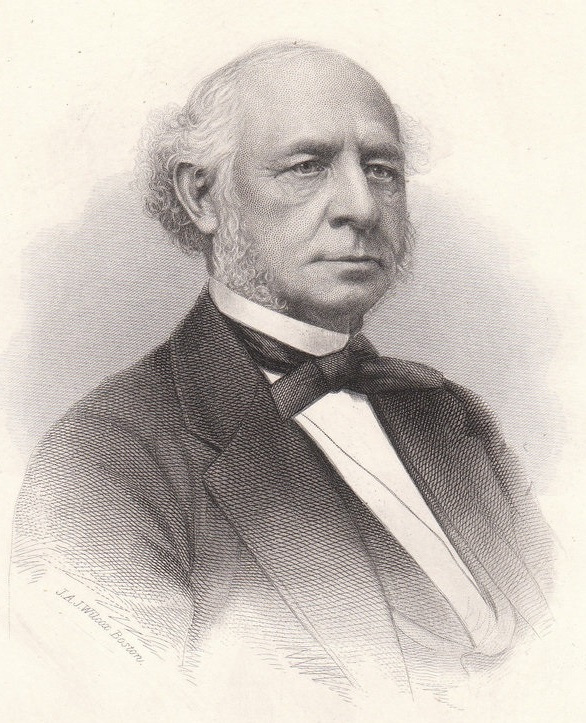

Member of the U.S. House of Representatives from Massachusetts's 3rd district
- In office March 4, 1853 – March 3, 1855
- Preceded by: James H. Duncan
- Succeeded by: William S. Damrell

Personal details
- Born: March 1, 1809 Boston, Massachusetts
- Died: January 31, 1877 (aged 67) Newton, Massachusetts
- Party: Whig, Republican

John Wiley Edmands (March 1, 1809 – January 31, 1877) was a member of the United States House of Representatives from Massachusetts.

Edmands was born in Boston on March 1, 1809. He completed preparatory studies, and graduated from English High School of Boston. He became interested in woolen mills in Dedham and the Pacific Mills Company in Lawrence.

Edmands was elected as a Whig to the Thirty-third Congress (March 4, 1853 – March 3, 1855). He declined to be a candidate for renomination in 1854, and returned to Pacific Mills and served as its treasurer. Edmands was a presidential elector on the Republican ticket in 1868.

He died in Newton on January 31, 1877. His interment was in Mount Auburn Cemetery in Cambridge.

== Mill owner ==
=== Maverick Woolen Mills ===
Following Benjamin Bussey's 1842 death, his woolen mill on Mother Brook was sold in November 1843 to Edmands, who was then one of the partners in the company that served as the mill's selling agent, Amos & Abbot Lawrence. The land was purchased for $30,000 while the machinery, the stock, and materials were sold for more than $45,000. In 1850, he sold half of the company, which he renamed Maverick Woolen Mill, to Gardner Colby.

=== Merchants Woolen Company ===
In 1863, Colby and Edmands took in new partners, including Charles L. Harding, to form the Merchant Woolen Company. The new company purchased the Maverick Woolen Mills and eventually all of the other mills on Mother Brook. By the 1870s, the Merchant's Woolen Company had monopolized all of the water in Mother Brook. In 1870, they were the largest taxpayer in Dedham, Massachusetts and, when The New York Times wrote about them in 1887, it described the company as "one of the largest [industrial operations] in the state."

== Works cited ==
- Neiswander, Judith (2024). Mother Brook and the Mills of East Dedham. Damianos Publishing. ISBN 978-1-941573-66-2.
- Tritsch, Electa Kane (1986). Building Dedham. Dedham Historical Society.

U.S. House of Representatives
Preceded by James H. Duncan	Member of the U.S. House of Representatives from Massachusetts's 3rd congressional district March 4, 1853 – March 3, 1855	Succeeded by William S. Damrell
