= Dedham Woolen Mills =

The Dedham Woolen Mills was a company on Mother Brook in Dedham, Massachusetts.

== Ownership and incorporation ==
In 1824, Benjamin Bussey purchased the Dedham Worsted Company mill after its collapse, which was just three years after they opened. He obtained the land, the buildings, machinery, and water rights in the purchase. This was his second mill on Mother Brook, after the Norfolk Cotton Company.

Bussey combined the two mills as the Dedham Woolen Mills. In so doing, he established Mother Brook's first successful woolen mill, as well as the first fully integrated textile mill. He set up a one stop shop in which everything the carding and combing of the raw materials to the weaving, fulling, and dyeing of the finished product would be done at a single location and under common management. It would also be one of the first mills to produce broadcloth. It was in production between 1824 and 1843.

In September 1827, while John Quincy Adams was vising Massachusetts, he toured the Dedham Woolen Mills. According to Adams, the profits on the mill were small and Bussey "engaged in this undertaking upon patriotic motives."

The selling agents, A.A. Lawrence & Company, sold 20% of the textiles produced in Massachusetts and the rest around the country and as far west as the frontier. There were heavy financial losses in 1837 and 1838, but it was very profitable in other years.

== Facilities and production ==
Once Bussey owned both the first and second privileges, he spent a large amount of money to improve them over the next decade. The first thing he did was to lower the dam at the second privilege to increase the water power spinning the wheel. He also expanded the buildings there, building a larger building made of brick. It also burned peat for steam power, making it the most complex and most sophisticated mill ever on Mother Brook.

There was a fire in the dye house in 1827.

By 1832, it was the largest mill on Mother Brook and had new, cast iron machinery valued at $40,000. It processed 375,000 pounds of wool and produced 150,000 yards of cloth. There were 262 employees in the mill that year. They diversified their offerings, and began producing cheaper fabrics for sale, including a less refined form of broadcloth known as cassimere, as well as satinets.

Just two years later, setbacks in the economy caused them to lay off 200 employees and reduce the amount of wool they processed by 300,000 pounds.

== Management ==
Bussey's three principal assistants in the Dedham Woolen Mills were George H. Kuhn, John Golding, and Thomas Barrows. Kuhn was Bussey's agent and treasurer. (Note: Kuhn's account book is now in the archives of the Dedham Historical Society.) By 1833, he was Bussey's partner in the mill. He later became the executor of Bussey's estate.

Golding was an inventor who received nearly 60 patents in his life. As the overseer of the machinery in Bussey's mills, he was endlessly tinkering with them and made the process of carding much more efficient, and much cheaper. Barrows became the superintendent, and oversaw the day-to-day operations.

== Female employees ==
The new machines were larger and more efficient than the old, wooden looms they replaced. They also required more strength to operate than a child could provide, which necessitated a move away from child labor. Instead, the Dedham Woolen Mills began hiring unmarried Yankee women between the ages of 15 and 25.

In 1827, there were about 60 young women working at the mill. They were paid $0.60 a day, compared to the $0.90 a day men were paid.

== Works cited ==
- Dedham Historical Society (2001). Images of America: Dedham. Arcadia Publishing. ISBN 978-0-7385-0944-0.
- Neiswander, Judith (2024). Mother Brook and the Mills of East Dedham. Damianos Publishing. ISBN 978-1-941573-66-2.
- Worthington, Erastus (1900). Historical sketch of Mother Brook, Dedham, Mass: compiled from various records and papers, showing the diversion of a portion of the Charles River into the Neponset River and the manufactures on the stream, from 1639 to 1900. Dedham, MA: C.G. Wheeler.
