= Gardner Colby =

American businessman and philanthropist (1810–1879)

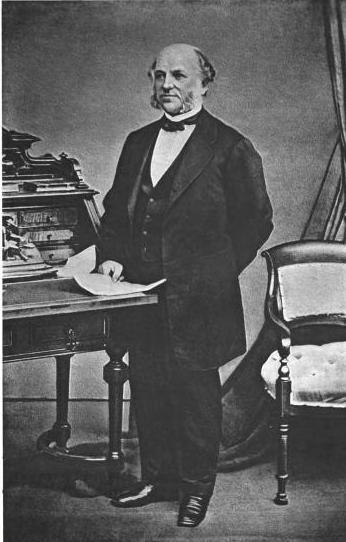
- Born: September 3, 1810; Bowdoinham, Maine, United States
- Died: April 2, 1879 (aged 68); Newton, Massachusetts, United States
- Resting place: Newton Cemetery, Newton, Massachusetts
- Occupations: Businessman, philanthropist
- Known for: Textile manufacturing, philanthropy to Colby College, president of Wisconsin Central Railroad
- Spouse: Mary Low Roberts (m. 1836)
- Children: Gardner Roberts Colby, Charles Lewis Colby, Henry Francis Colby, others
- Parent(s): Josiah C. and Sarah (Davidson) Colby

Signature
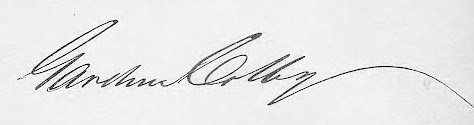

Gardner Colby (September 3, 1810 – April 2, 1879) was an American businessman and philanthropist active in textile manufacturing, railroad development, and Baptist educational institutions in New England. He served as president of the Wisconsin Central Railroad from 1871 to 1878 and became the namesake of Colby College in Waterville, Maine, following his $50,000 donation in 1865.

== Early life ==
Gardner Colby was born on September 3, 1810, in Bowdoinham, Maine, to Josiah C. and Sarah (Davidson) Colby. According to the Wisconsin Historical Society, his father was involved in business interests before losing his fortune during the War of 1812.

Following his father's death in 1814, the family faced financial difficulties. Jeremiah Chaplin, a Baptist minister who served as the first president of Waterville College (later renamed Colby College), arranged for the Colby family to operate a store in Charlestown, Massachusetts. The family later moved to Boston, where Gardner worked as a clerk while pursuing his education.

== Business career ==
=== Retail and importing ===
Colby began his career as a clerk in a dry-goods store, earning $150 per year plus board. Using his savings and a small loan, he opened his own retail store in Boston. Gardner Colby & Company eventually expanded into wholesale operations and importing, including trade with China.

=== Textile manufacturing ===
==== Maverick Woolen Mills ====
In 1850, Colby entered the textile industry when he purchased a half-interest in what became known as the Maverick Woolen Mill from J. Wiley Edmands. The mill was located on Mother Brook in what is now Dedham, Massachusetts. The mill had been established following the 1842 death of Benjamin Bussey, whose woolen mill was sold to Edmands in November 1843 for $30,000, with machinery and materials valued at over $45,000.

==== Merchants Woolen Company ====
In 1863, Colby and Edmands formed the Merchants Woolen Company with additional investors, including Charles L. Harding. The company acquired the Maverick Woolen Mills and eventually purchased other mills operating on Mother Brook. By the 1870s, the Merchants Woolen Company controlled water rights on Mother Brook.

The company became the largest taxpayer in Dedham, Massachusetts by 1870. During the Civil War, Colby obtained government contracts for supplying clothing to the Union Army, which according to the Wisconsin Historical Society, allowed him to acquire "a considerable fortune." An 1887 article in The New York Times described the operation as "one of the larger [industrial operations] in the state."

=== Wisconsin Central Railroad ===
In 1869, Colby made his first trip to Wisconsin and became interested in the construction of the Wisconsin Central Railroad, serving as its president from 1871 to 1878. The Wisconsin Historical Society notes that Colby provided financial backing for the railroad project while bringing in Elijah B. Phillips of the Lake Shore and Northern Indiana Railway to manage construction.

Construction began June 15, 1871, in West Menasha. The railroad employed up to 2,000 men, 600 horses, and 100 yoke of oxen for clearing and grading the roadbed. By September, rails reached 51 miles northwest of Stevens Point to a station initially called "Section 53," later renamed Colby in honor of Gardner Colby's son Charles, who was a director of the Wisconsin Central.

The railroad faced financial difficulties during the Panic of 1873, when Colby encountered challenges raising additional funds from investors. The 340-mile line to Lake Superior was completed in 1878, after which Colby retired from the railroad business and returned to Massachusetts.

== Philanthropy ==
=== Baptist institutions ===
As a Baptist, Colby was involved in various Christian institutions. According to his 1879 memorial tribute, he "occupied many important places of trust and honor in the Baptist denomination, and for years was treasurer of Newton theological seminary."

=== Colby College ===
On August 9, 1865, Gardner Colby attended Waterville College's commencement dinner and announced a $50,000 matching donation to the college, conditional on the institution raising an additional $100,000. The college met this condition within two years, and in 1867 was renamed Colby University in his honor. According to the Press Herald, Colby provided approximately $200,000 total to the college by his death in 1879 and served as a trustee from 1864 until his death.

=== Newton Theological Seminary ===
Colby funded the construction of Colby Hall, which housed the library and chapel at Newton Theological Seminary. The building was designed by Alexander Esty in 1866 and constructed of stone with an atypical third-story mansard roof. His 1879 memorial tribute notes that he also made donations to Brown University and the American Baptist missionary union.

== Personal life ==
In 1836, Colby married Mary Low Roberts of Gloucester, Massachusetts. Their children included Charles Lewis Colby (born 1839), who graduated from Brown University in 1858 and later became president of the Wisconsin Central Railroad, and Henry Francis Colby (born November 25, 1842), who graduated from Brown in 1862 and Newton Theological Seminary in 1867, becoming a Baptist minister. They also had a son Gardner Roberts Colby.

Colby died on April 2, 1879, at his home in Newton, Massachusetts, and was buried in Newton Cemetery.

== Legacy ==
Places and institutions named in Colby's honor include:

- Colby College in Waterville, Maine
- Colby Hall at Andover Newton Theological School
- The town of Colby, Wisconsin, named after his son Charles Lewis Colby during construction of the Wisconsin Central Railroad
