= Daniel Pond =

English settler (1620s/30s–1697/98)

Lt. Daniel Pond (1620s/1630s – 1697/1698) was a prominent early settler of Dedham, Massachusetts.

== Early life ==
Pond was born in the 1620s or 1630s in England to Robert and Mary Pond.

== Life in Dedham ==
Pond arrived in Dedham around 1652 and purchased land from Nathaniel Fisher and Ralph Wheelock. Pond served as a selectman in Dedham for 14 terms, beginning in 1661. As a selectmen, he was one of ten men, or roughly 5% of the adult male population, who filled 60% of the seats on the board.

Pond and Ezra Morse were given permission by the Town to erect a new corn mill on Mother Brook, so long as it was completed by June 24, 1665. He performed several carpentry jobs on the meetinghouse of the First Church and Parish in Dedham, including hanging the first bell.

When the town of Wrentham, Massachusetts split off from Dedham, he became an owner of real estate there as well. He was awarded several lots there, but probably never lived in Wrentham.

He was a lieutenant in the militia and took the freeman's oath in 1690. He was a husbandman. He also worked as a carpenter.

== Family ==
He married Abigail Shepard around 1652, a member of the church in Cambridge, Massachusetts. They had a daughter, also named Abigail, who was born in Dedham but not baptized there. A son was baptized, however, on August 22, 1653, less than two weeks after he joined the church on the 11th. They had seven children, including John, Ephraim, Robert, and Jabez.

After his wife died on July 5, 1661, he married Ann Edwards two months later. He died on February 4, 1697-8 and Ann outlived him.

His great-great grandson was Oliver Ellsworth, an American founding father and jurist.

== Works cited ==
- Hanson, Robert Brand (1976). Dedham, Massachusetts, 1635-1890. Dedham Historical Society.
- Worthington, Erastus (1827). The history of Dedham: from the beginning of its settlement, in September 1635, to May 1827. Dutton and Wentworth.
- Harris, Edward Doubleday (1873). A Genealogical Record of Daniel Pond, and His Descendants. W.P. Lunt. ISBN 978-0-7404-3260-6.
- Worthington, Erastus (1900). Historical sketch of Mother Brook, Dedham, Mass: compiled from various records and papers, showing the diversion of a portion of the Charles River into the Neponset River and the manufactures on the stream, from 1639 to 1900. Dedham, MA: C.G. Wheeler.
- Lamson, Alvan (1839). A History of the First Church and Parish in Dedham, in Three Discourses. Herman Mann.
- Mann, Herman (1847). Historical Annals of Dedham: From Its Settlement in 1635 to 1847. H. Mann.
