= Samuel Morse (Dedham) =

English-born American colonist (1585–1654)

Samuel Morse (1585–1654) was an original proprietor of Dedham, Massachusetts who served on the board of selectmen for two years. He was also a founder of Medfield, Massachusetts when it broke away from Dedham. He was elected a selectman before joining the First Church and Parish in Dedham. He was a signer of the Dedham Covenant.

Morse was born in England in 1585 and came to Dedham from London. With his wife, Elizabeth, he was the father of Joseph, Abigail, John, Daniel, Samuel, Jeremiah, and Mary. He died in 1654. It was said in 1907 that "no family has ranked higher in eastern Massachusetts for the past two hundred and fifty years than the descendants" of Morse. He was the grandfather of Ezra Morse.

== Works cited ==
- Worthington, Erastus (1827). The history of Dedham: from the beginning of its settlement, in September 1635, to May 1827. Dutton and Wentworth. p. 29.
- Hanson, Robert Brand (1976). Dedham, Massachusetts, 1635-1890. Dedham Historical Society.
