= Royal O. Storrs =

American businessman (1815–1888)

Royal Otis Storrs
- Born: September 7, 1815; Mansfield, Connecticut, U.S.
- Died: May 25, 1888 (aged 72); Dedham, Massachusetts, U.S.
- Occupation: Businessman

Royal Otis Storrs (September 7, 1815 – May 25, 1888) was an American businessman, banker, and mill owner.

== Personal life ==
Storrs was born in Mansfield, Connecticut, and moved to Dedham, Massachusetts, in 1868. There he built a house on High Street, where the athletic field next to the Dedham Pool stands today.

His siblings included Charles and Augustus Storrs. Storrs had a 213-acre cattle farm east of Hartford, Connecticut. Storrs sold the farm, which he had inherited from his father, to his younger brother. Today that farm is the University of Connecticut.

With his wife, Lora, he had three children, including Frederick. The Boston Herald said in 1882 that he was "not a social man and... seldom seen in company."

== Career ==
Storrs worked for many years at Samuel Slater's mill in Webster, Massachusetts. After moving to Dedham, first he leased the Merchant's Woolen Mill, and then he bought it in September 1875.

Additionally, he was vice president of the Dedham Institution for Savings and the first president of the Dedham Water Company.

=== Mother Brook ===
The Boston Herald said he "has always been looked upon as harsh with his help and overbearing generally in his disposition." During the East Dedham Strike of 1875, striking employees had particularly harsh words for Storrs. One said that he "has no more conscience than a mad dog. He has his spies in every room." Another said he had "ruined the town."

However, when employees hours were reduced during an economic downturn, he ordered two shipments of flour and sold them to employees "at the lowest possible figure, $8.50 a barrel... to lessen the cost of living while the mills are running on short time."

After working as the overseer of the Merchant Woolen Mill, he purchased it in 1875, along with 13 acres of land, the company's tenements and storehouses, and the water rights to the fourth privilege. He paid Charles and Edgar Harding $60,000 and renamed the company Storrs & Company. The company produced beaver cloth and cassimere.

In 1882, it was discovered that Storrs had falsified documents and was $437,500 in debt. Storrs declared bankruptcy before a standing room only crowd at the Norfolk County Courthouse. He was said to look "careworn" and "his eyes are deeply sunken, signifying meditative agony." A Supreme Court justice told a reporter that "Storrs is a good fellow, but he will like when he wants money."

== Civic involvement ==
Storrs was a member of the School Committee, a Trustee of the Dedham Public Library, and the Selectmen. He was also on the Board of Health, the committee that built Brookdale Cemetery, the Committee of the Dedham Fire Department, the Town Assessor, and an Overseer of the Poor. He founded the East Dedham branch of the library.

His extensive involvement was not appreciated by all, as the Dedham Transcript reported "Mr. Storrs has altogether too much power in East Dedham,... as no agent of a mill, be he ever so human, should be a Selectman, Assessor, Overseer of the Poor, and a member of the School Committee."

He was the lead donor in 1870 towards the establishment of an evening school with a contribution of $25, plus large tables for students and other supplies. Storrs may have hoped that by educating his workforce, 25% of whom attended the school, that it would reduce the high turnover within the mills.

== Works cited ==
- Neiswander, Judith (2024). Mother Brook and the Mills of East Dedham. Damianos Publishing. ISBN 978-1-941573-66-2.
- Smith, Frank (1936). A History of Dedham, Massachusetts. Transcript Press, Incorporated.
- Worthington, Erastus (1900). Historical sketch of Mother Brook, Dedham, Mass: compiled from various records and papers, showing the diversion of a portion of the Charles River into the Neponset River and the manufactures on the stream, from 1639 to 1900. Dedham, MA: C.G. Wheeler.
