= Ezra W. Taft =

American politician

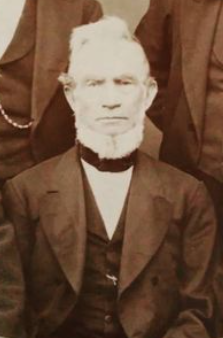
Ezra W. Taft

Ezra W. Taft (August 26, 1800 – February 8, 1885) was a politician and businessman from Dedham, Massachusetts. He represented the Massachusetts House of Representatives' 1st Norfolk district in the Great and General Court.

Taft was born to Frederick and Abigail Wood Taft in Uxbridge, Massachusetts on August 26, 1800. Early in life he commenced that business activity which became characteristic of the man. He moved to Dedham in 1815 and went to work with Frederick A Taft who started the Dedham Manufacturing Company. He remained in Dedham until 1820. In that year, then only twenty years of age, he went to the neighboring town of Walpole where he hired a little mill and made forty thousand yards of negro cloth for the Southern trade. In 1823, he went to Dover, New Hampshire and assisted in starting the Cocheco Mill, one of the largest cotton mills in New England. He remained three years as overseer.

In 1826, he returned to Dedham and took the agency of the Dedham Manufacturing Company, a position he retained six years. In 1832, Taft severed his connection with this company and assumed the agency of the Norfolk Manufacturing Company at East Dedham where he built the stone mill still standing. He remained in this connection thirty years. At the time Taft first identified himself with the manufacturing business, all yarn was spun at the mills and sent out through the country to be woven. He lived to witness the development of the new woolen mill, described as one of the wonders of the nineteenth century. In 1864, Mr Taft retired from manufacturing and after that time devoted himself almost continuously to the business of the Town of Dedham.

For more thirty years he was a member of the school committee. He was for fourteen successive years a Dedham selectmen, during twelve of which he was chairman of the board. He also represented Dedham for four years in the Legislature besides filling many other positions of honor and trust. At the end of his tenure as a selectman, he was described as "strictly honest, and a faithful 'watch-dog of the treasury.'"

However, a correspondent to the Boston Globe wrote that "Mr. Taft's weakness, it is said, is a hallucination that he officially owns the town, and he therefor has no delicacy about altering the sense of a petition, it is asserted, signed by tax-payers for insertion in a town meeting warrant." He lost his seat as a selectman in the 1878 election.

For thirty one years he was a director of the Dedham Bank, including as president beginning in 1873. He was connected with the Dedham Institution for Savings since its organization and was on the investment committee. He was also a member of the Norfolk Insurance Company and a director in the Dedham Mutual Insurance Company. It was said that no citizen of the town of Dedham had been so continuously connected with bank and town business as Taft.

Taft was a member of the Orthodox Church in Dedham and a Republican. On September 8, 1830, Taft married Lendamine Draper, the eldest daughter of Calvin Guild of Dedham. Their family consisted of six children. Guild married Taft's sister, Margaret, in 1836.

== Works cited ==
- Hurd, Duane Hamilton (1884). History of Norfolk County, Massachusetts: With Biographical Sketches of Many of Its Pioneers and Prominent Men. J. W. Lewis & Company.
- Neiswander, Judith (2024). Mother Brook and the Mills of East Dedham. Damianos Publishing. ISBN 978-1-941573-66-2.
