= Mother Brook =

Canal in the United States of America

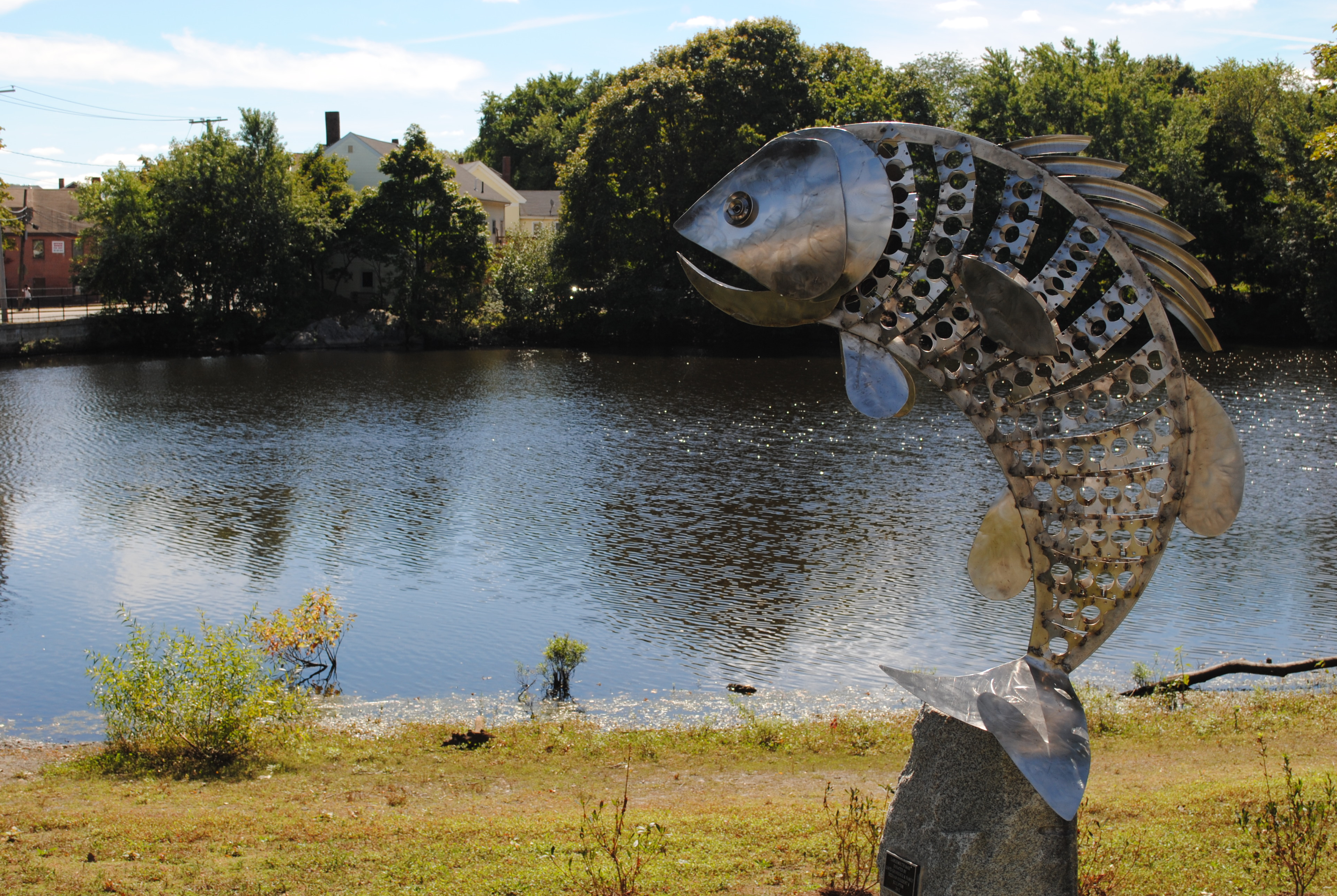
- A sculpture at Mill Pond Park along the banks of Mother Brook
- Etymology: First man-made canal in the United States

Location
- Country: United States
- State: Massachusetts

Physical characteristics
- Source: Charles River
  - location: Dedham, Massachusetts
  - coordinates: 42°15′18″N 71°09′53″W Location of the USGS Hydrologic Unit, .4 mi downstream from diversion from Charles River
  - elevation: 97 ft (30 m) approximate using MapMyRun
- Mouth: Neponset River
  - location: Hyde Park, Massachusetts
  - coordinates: 42°15′08″N 71°07′23″W
  - elevation: 55 ft (17 m) approximate using MapMyRun
- Length: 3.6 mi (5.8 km)approximate using MapMyRun
- Discharge
  - location: Readville, Massachusetts
  - average: 23 cu ft/s (0.65 m^{3}/s)
  - minimum: 0 cu ft/s (0 m^{3}/s)
  - maximum: 350 cu ft/s (9.9 m^{3}/s)

Mother Brook is an artificial waterway in Dedham, and Hyde Park, Massachusetts, and the first man-made canal in the present-day United States. (Note: This canal has been described as the first man-made canal in the United States since at least the 1840s. Remains of much older canals dug by the Hohokam people have been uncovered in Arizona, although these are irrigation canals, not power or hydraulic canals like Mother Brook.) Constructed in 1639 by settlers of the Massachusetts Bay Colony, it diverts water from the Charles River to the Neponset River and was originally designed to power water mills. Its creation helped establish Dedham’s early economy and laid the foundation for over 300 years of continuous industrial use.

During the 18th and 19th centuries, Mother Brook powered a succession of grist, saw, paper, textile, and woolen mills, fueling the rise of East Dedham as a densely populated mill village. The brook was central to legal disputes over water rights and served as a key industrial corridor well into the 20th century. As the textile industry declined after World War I, the mills closed or were repurposed, and parts of the brook were redirected or covered.

By the mid-20th century, decades of industrial waste had severely polluted the brook. State and federal agencies have since undertaken extensive remediation efforts, and water quality has improved significantly. Today, Mother Brook is part of a flood-control system that diverts water from the Charles River to the Neponset River. It is monitored by the Neponset River Watershed Association, and its banks include parks, trails, and conservation land. It remains a rare example of a colonial-era engineering project that continues to influence the modern urban landscape.

== Early history ==
=== Origins ===
Dedham, Massachusetts was first settled in 1635 and incorporated in 1636. The settlers needed a mill for grinding corn, as hand mills required significant effort. Windmills had been attempted, but the wind was too unreliable, and the North End, where a windmill was moved in 1632, was too far away. In 1633, the first water-powered grist mill was established in Dorchester along the Neponset River at a dam erected just above the tidal basin. (Note: As of 2025, this site is where the Adams Street bridge crosses the river.)

By the late 1630s, the closest watermill was in Watertown, 17 miles away by boat. Small amounts of grain could also be milled into flour using labor-intensive handmills. (Note: A handmill likely brought over from England by John Farrington is today in the collection of the Dedham Museum and Archive.) Neither transporting the grain to distant mills nor producing small amounts in a handmill were attractive options, and so the colonists looked into creating their own mill.

Abraham Shaw, who—like many other Dedhamites—came from Watertown, arrived in Dedham in 1637. He was granted 60 acres (24 ha) of land on the condition that he erect a watermill, which he intended to build on the Charles River near the present-day Needham Street bridge. (Note: The site was discovered in the 1840s when excavations on the site uncovered the remnants of a millrace.) Every man in the town was required to help bring the large millstone to Dedham from Watertown. (Note: Another condition of the grant was that if Shaw ever sold the mill, the town would have the right of first refusal to purchase it back from him.) Shaw died in 1638 before he could complete his mill, however, and his heirs were not interested in building the mill.

Although the initial settlement was adjacent to the Charles, the river in that vicinity was slow-moving, with little elevation change to provide power for a water wheel. A small stream, then called East Brook, ran nearby—about 100 rods (1,600 feet; 500 metres) from present-day Washington Street behind Brookdale Cemetery—and emptied into the Neponset River. In the spring, the Charles would occasionally flood into a swamp at Purchase Meadow between its banks and East Brook.

East Brook had an elevation change of more than 40 feet over its 3.5-mile course from near the early Dedham settlement to the Neponset River, which was sufficient to drive a watermill. However, it had a low water flow, making it inadequate for mill operations on its own. The drop in the first mile alone is 45 ft (14 m).

=== Creation of Mother Brook ===
A year after Shaw's death, the town was still without a mill. A committee was formed, and "an audacious plan" was devised to divert some of the plentiful water from the placid Charles River into the steep but scarce East Brook. On March 25, 1639, the town ordered a 4,000-foot ditch to be dug at public expense. (Note: "Ordered yt a Ditch shalbe made at a comon charge thrugh purchashed medowe unto ye East brooke yt may bother be a ptieon fence in ye same; as also may serve for a course unto a water mille; yt it shall be found fitting to set a mille upon ye sayd brooke by ye judgement of a workman for yt purpose.") A tax was levied on the settlers to fund the project. The settlers may have been influenced by the draining of the Fens in The Wash, a region in England near many of their hometowns.

The town was so confident in the project that work began before a new miller had been found to replace Shaw. There is no record of who dug the ditch or how long the task took. (Note: Whiting family history claims it was done by Nathaniel Whiting.) The available labor force would have been limited to the 30 men who headed households in the town at the time, along with various servants and male relatives. Tools likely included iron spades, axes, and shovels, and oxen may also have been employed. Excavated earth, clay, rocks, and other materials were transported overland to build a dam and form a mill pond. A sill was also constructed to regulate the flow of water from the Charles River into Mother Brook.

While the exact completion date is unknown, water was flowing through the ditch by July 14, 1641. Originally referred to as "the Ditch," it has been known as Mother Brook since at least 1678. There is no record of any celebration marking its completion. At a meeting on July 14, 1641, Jonathan Fairbanks, Francis Chickering, and John Dwight were tasked with laying out a cartway from the village to the mill.

The creation of Mother Brook took place alongside other foundational efforts required to establish a town in the wilderness: felling trees, building homes, planting crops, clearing fields, and more. Its construction has been described as "an inspiring expression of profound communal purpose." Digging the brook made Boston and some surrounding communities an island, accessible only by crossing over water, leading one commentator to refer to Mother Brook as "Massachusetts' Panama Canal."

=== The first mill ===
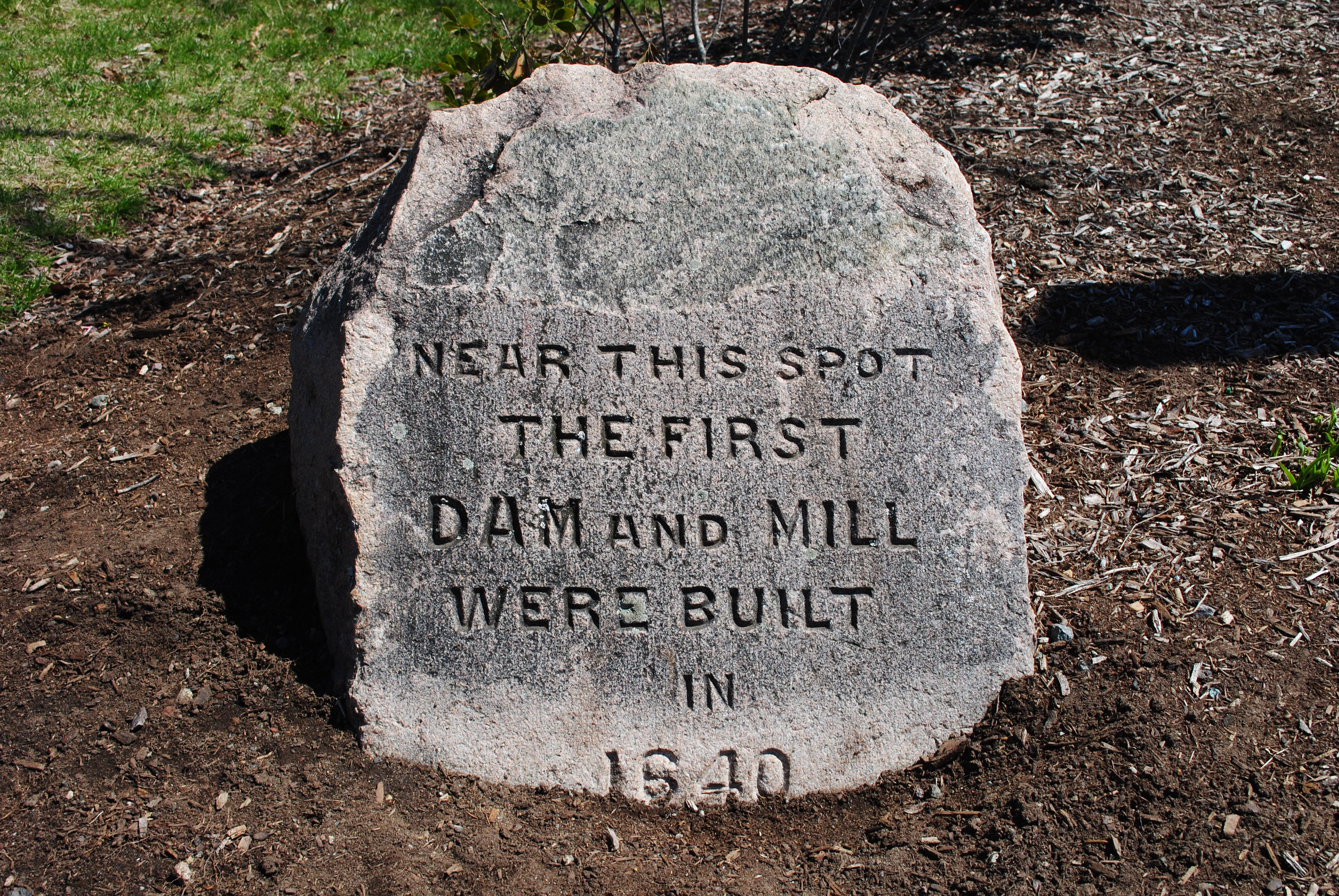
A stone from 1886 marking the location of the first mill built on Mother Brook

The town offered an incentive of 60 acres of land to anyone who would construct and maintain a corn mill, provided that the mill was operational by "the first of the 10th month" [i.e., December]. (Note: Before the adaptation of the Gregorian calendar in the United States, the year did not begin in January.)

In 1641, John Elderkin, a recent arrival from Lynn, built the first corn mill on a dam across East Brook, near the present-day Condon Park and the intersection of Bussey Street and Colburn Street. In return, he received three acres of land along the brook. Elderkin, a highly sought-after builder, left Dedham in 1642, only months after opening the mill. (Note: He went on to build mills, meetinghouses, and wharves around New England.) He sold all of his land to Nathaniel Whiting.

This mill is considered the first public utility in the United States. Settlers could grind their corn at the site in exchange for a tithe, which helped support its maintenance. The town relinquished rights to the brook in 1682, and placed a commemorative marker on the site in 1886.

Also in 1642, Elderkin sold half of his interest in the mill to Whiting, and the other half to John Allin, Nathan Aldis, and John Dwight. (Note: Allin was the minister, Aldis the deacon, and Dwight was Whiting's father-in-law.) The four partners operated the mill in what was described as a "rather stormy partnership" until 1649, when Whiting became the sole owner. The town criticized Whiting for the "insufficient performance" of the mill under his management. In 1652, Whiting sold his mill and town rights to John Dwight, Francis Chickering, Joshua Fisher, and John Morse for £250, but bought them back the following year.

Whiting and his wife, Hannah, had 14 children. Five generations of Whiting descendants operated the mill from 1641 until its sale in 1823. The family retained ownership of other land along Mother Brook until the 1830s.

=== Conflict with a second mill ===
Whiting took sole possession of the mill in 1649—the same year the town began discussing the construction of a second mill. In January 1653, the town offered land to Robert Crossman to build a mill on the Charles River where Shaw had originally planned. Crossman declined, but Whiting, displeased by the prospect of competition, offered to sell his mill back to the town for £250.

For 15 years, there were "many complaints being made by several inhabitants of much damage by deficient grinding of corn at the present mill." As Whiting’s performance failed to improve, the town authorized Daniel Pond and Ezra Morse in 1664 to construct a new grist mill upstream, at the present-day intersection of Maverick and High Streets. The agreement required the mill to be operational by June 24, 1665. It was completed in 1666, with Morse as the sole proprietor. The new mill was located closer to the town center than Whiting's.

Whiting was incensed by the competition for both water and customers. One historian wrote that he "made something of a crusade of opposition" to the new mill. Town records indicate that considerable time was spent attempting to mediate the dispute. (Note: The third paragraph of the Town Covenant stated: "That if at any time differences shall rise between parties of our said town, that then such party or parties shall presently refer all such differences unto some one, two or three others of our said society to be fully accorded and determined without any further delay, if it possibly may be.") After a meeting with the Selectmen, both parties agreed not to interfere with one another’s business. Two years later, Morse was instructed not to restrict the water flow to such an extent that it impaired milling at Whiting’s site.

The town resolved that "in time of drought or want of water, the water shall in no such time be raised so high by the occasion of the new mill, that the water be thereby hindered of its free course or passage out of the Charles River to the mill." At the same time, Whiting was prohibited from raising water levels in his pond so high as to cause backwater damage to Morse's mill. He was also told to repair leaks in his own dam before filing further complaints.

Disputes between the two mills continued for more than 40 years, culminating in a lawsuit. In 1678, the Town Meeting voted to stop entertaining Whiting’s complaints. Even after Whiting’s death in 1682, his heirs attempted to sue but were unsuccessful.

By 1699, the town had grown weary of the conflict. Morse’s dam was dismantled, and he was compensated with 40 acres of land near the Neponset River at Tiot. The idea appears to have been Morse’s. He established a new mill at the Tiot site—now in Norwood, Massachusetts—adjacent to a sawmill built in 1664 by Joshua Fisher and Eleazer Lusher. (Note: Fisher's mill appears today on the seal of Walpole, Massachusetts.)

In the early 18th century, Joseph Lewis, Whiting’s son-in-law, constructed a leather mill at the former Morse dam site. (Note: Neiswander lists his first name as John. Lewis owned land on Mother Brook as early as 1680, and his house was located at the third privilege, next to the grist mill.)

=== New mills at the third privilege ===
The next mill on the brook was constructed in 1682 near present-day Saw Mill Lane. Although the privilege had originally been requested by Jonathan Fairbanks and James Draper, it was ultimately granted to Draper and Nathaniel Whiting instead—likely to avoid further conflict with Whiting. (Note: The land granted to them initially extended to present-day Saw Mill Lane, but it later reverted to the town.) The resulting fulling mill—the first textile mill in Dedham—did not require a dam, and its downstream location did not pose a threat to Whiting’s upstream operations.

Whiting died on January 15, 1682, the same day the selectmen granted him the privilege. The town added a provision that if it later chose to erect a corn mill on the brook, it could do so—unless Draper and Whiting did so themselves, at their own expense. Timothy Whiting, Nathaniel’s son, later signed the agreement with Draper and his son. This mill, like the one upstream, remained in the hands of Whiting’s descendants for 180 years.

A grist mill and sawmill were later built on the site and powered by the same waterwheel. Timothy Whiting constructed the sawmill in 1699, though the construction date of the grist mill was not recorded. When one of the mills burned in 1700, the town loaned Whiting £20 to rebuild.

== Industrialization of Mother Brook ==
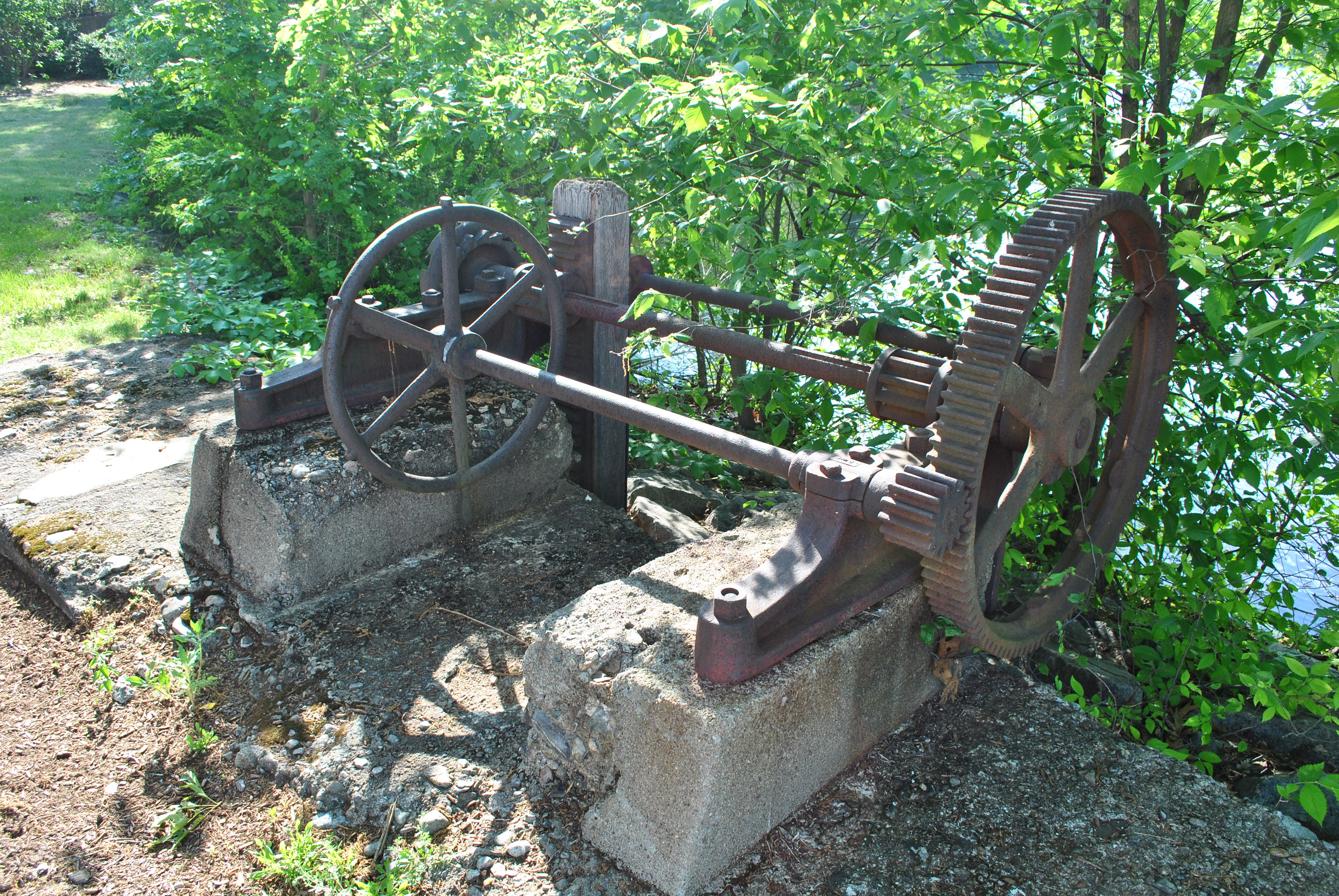
Old gears on Mother Brook

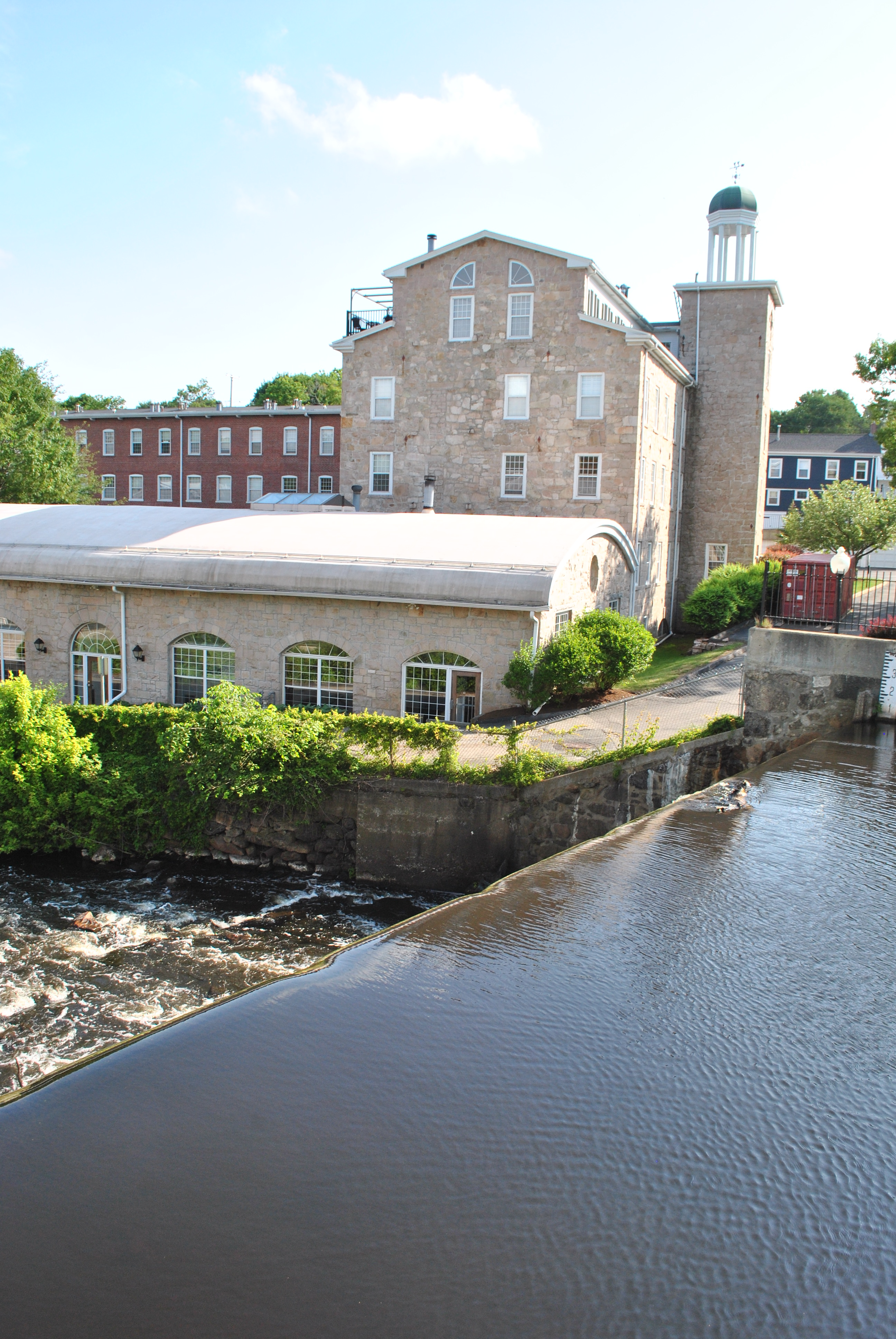
The fourth privilege with the stone mill in the background

=== Expanding industries ===
Over time, dams and mills were built at five locations along the brook, known as "privileges," (Note: A privilege would be called a "permit" in modern parlance.) in Dedham and what is now the Readville neighborhood of Hyde Park, which was originally part of Dedham. The first three privileges were granted in the 17th century to support agricultural needs in the local farming community.

By 1799, the brook powered two grist mills capable of running "in the driest season of the year," along with two sawmills, a wire mill, and several paper mills—another was then under construction. The fourth and fifth privileges, granted in the 18th and 19th centuries, were designated for manufacturing. By the mid-19th century, all five privileges supported large industrial textile mills.

Mother Brook provided water power at various times to a wide range of industrial operations. These included the manufacture of cotton, wool, paper, wire, carpets, and leather. The mills also processed corn, fulled cloth, stamped coins, sawed lumber, and produced nails and woven cloth. The use of dams for these operations impacted downstream residents who relied on the water for agriculture, livestock, or other needs.

The opening of the first cotton-spinning factory in 1808 marked a turning point that would shape the brook’s future for the next 125 years. By the time of the Civil War, three cotton mills operated along Mother Brook—most increasingly owned by men from outside Dedham.

=== Rise of industrialization ===
When Dedham became the seat of Norfolk County in 1793, an influx of educated and professional men brought new ideas, energy, and capital to the town. However, Dedham had limited infrastructure to take advantage of these resources. Like much of the Commonwealth, its roads were poorly maintained, making it difficult to transport raw materials in and finished goods out. High Street, which linked the village to the mills, was not constructed until 1806.

Since Dedham’s founding in 1636, farming had been the dominant way of life. While land and resources were initially plentiful, they began to diminish by the early 19th century. By 1814, it was said that "some of the most respectable and enterprising young men of Dedham" worked in the mills—a shift in the town’s economic and social fabric. Operating a mill was even described as "a patriotic act that supported the independence of the new nation." By the 1820s, cotton mills had become a permanent fixture along the brook.

By the 1830s, the mills had been in use for two centuries. Initially built with simple construction methods, they had become "exceedingly dilapidated relics that attracted the attention of local artists." These artists saw them as "picturesque artifacts of a simpler and more peaceful past," contrasting with the modern mills that emitted smoke and discharged pollutants into the water.

The arrival of the Dedham Branch railroad in 1842, and its nearby Stone Haven station, allowed coal to be easily transported to the mills. This powered steam engines in several facilities. These engines likely supplemented water power when supply was insufficient and may eventually have replaced it altogether. The brook may also have been used to cool the steam machinery.

In 1886, it was estimated that between $2,000,000 and $5,000,000 worth of manufacturing property existed along the banks of Mother Brook and the Neponset River out to Boston Harbor.

=== Working conditions ===
Working under harsh conditions, many laborers who came to Dedham stayed only briefly before moving on. Large families—often from unproductive farms—were recruited to work in the mills. These "family mills" employed both adults and children, and many workers arrived destitute. They had few rights or alternatives and were described as "entirely subject to the control of management." If the mills closed temporarily or an employee was injured, workers could lose not just their wages but also the company-provided housing.

Mill employees—called "operators" because they operated machines—typically worked six days a week, starting at first light. Shifts averaged 13 hours in the summer and 11 hours in the winter. Later, they worked 12–14 hours Monday through Friday, with half-days on Saturdays and Sundays off. A bell summoned them to work each morning and signaled the end of the day; if workers weren’t inside before the bell rang, the gates were locked and they lost a day’s pay. They received two 30-minute breaks—one in the morning and one at midday—to eat.

The mills were deafeningly loud, filled with clattering machines, and the work was monotonous yet required constant vigilance to keep yarn from breaking. Rooms were stuffy, windows were rarely opened, and the air was thick with lint. Because little daylight entered through the windows, small whale oil lamps were mounted on pegs beside the carding and spinning machines.

In the early 1800s, workers had only two holidays: the Fourth of July and Thanksgiving, in addition to militia training days. When Irish Catholics began arriving, they refused to work on Christmas. At first, Protestants filled in for the menial and dirty tasks—such as cleaning the privies—typically performed by Catholic employees. By around 1860, however, Christmas became a general holiday.

Overseers wielded significant power. Workers could be fired for sitting, talking, or reading on the job. During a period when mill work appealed to educated young women, a waiting list often existed to fill vacancies.

By the mid to late 19th century, working conditions in the mills—typical of the era—were often described as "dehumanizing." Many employees were poorly educated immigrants who did not speak English and had few alternatives. They endured 12–14 hour days in hot, noisy rooms. When profits declined, mill owners tried to extract more labor: machines were sped up, and more were added in a process known as "speed up and stretch out."

These conditions had a disproportionate effect on women. While men worked as overseers, mechanics, or in mobile support roles, women were typically confined to operating machines and had little autonomy.

Wages were among the few cost variables owners could control. The Merchant Woolen Company, which owned all the mills along Mother Brook, reduced wages in 1872, 1873, 1874, 1876 (by 7–15%), 1878, 1885, and 1893. In 1878, workers reported it was difficult to support a family on $280 per year. (Note: Equivalent to $8,376 in 2023.)

=== Female labor ===
Women, who had fewer employment opportunities, were paid less than men. At the Dedham Woolen Mills, they earned $0.60 per day compared to $0.90 for men.

As textile production expanded, young women were no longer needed at home to weave their own cloth. Many held mill jobs for only a few years before marrying, and during layoffs they could return to live with their families.

Mill work offered a degree of independence to women raised on isolated farms. They could live with other young women, earn their own wages, and choose whether to spend their income on themselves or support their families. Most heard about mill jobs by word of mouth and came to work with friends who had arrived before them.

To recruit educated women from respectable families, mill owners emphasized that conditions in New England were different from the harsh environments faced by British factory workers. Boarding houses for female workers were supervised by a married couple or a matron, and subject to a "strict system of moral police." Some offered opportunities for cultural enrichment, including book clubs, lectures, recitals, and group outings—though it is unclear to what extent such amenities existed along Mother Brook.

Room and board costs were deducted directly from pay and sent to the boarding houses, incentivizing matrons to reduce provisions. Strict house rules were enforced, including curfews. A single bed was often shared by two or three women, and there was little to no privacy. Church attendance on Sundays was mandatory.

After the adoption of the steam engine, which allowed factories to be built away from rivers, new mills began to proliferate. The increase in competition led owners to reduce boarding house amenities and allowed working conditions to deteriorate. By the mid-1840s, mill life was no longer attractive to American women from middle-class families, who began to leave the workforce. Immigrants gradually replaced them.

By the 1850s, women considered themselves fortunate to earn $2.50 per week. There was no fixed payday; instead, they collected money as needed from their account in the mill’s counting room. Meals were small and of poor quality, often the same every day. One day a week, dinner consisted solely of bread and milk. As chairs and rugs were considered luxuries, workers sat on benches.

=== Child labor ===
The vast majority of mill employees were children younger than 16. Newspaper advertisements specifically sought families with multiple children—or even children on their own—to work in the mills. Because the machines were simple to operate, one adult could oversee the work of many children.

When Josiah Quincy III visited a similar mill in Pawtucket, Rhode Island, he observed "a dull dejection in the countenances of all" the children and believed they should instead have access to "air, space, and sports."

In 1836, the Commonwealth of Massachusetts enacted a law requiring every child under the age of 15 to attend school for at least three of the preceding 12 months before becoming eligible for mill work. A separate law passed in 1842 limited children under 12 to working no more than 10 hours a day.

In Dedham’s Mill Village, students were attending school for eight weeks annually by 1807 or 1808. By the 1860s, the summer session had expanded to 20 weeks. However, when large numbers of children began entering the workforce, the neighborhood school was closed.

=== The East Dedham Strike ===
The labor movement in the United States began to gain traction in the 1870s. In May 1874, the Great and General Court of Massachusetts passed a law limiting women and children to 10-hour workdays in mills. However, the law lacked enforcement mechanisms and was widely ignored.

At the Merchant's Woolen Mills, which then owned all the mills along Mother Brook, employees were required to work 65.5 hours per week—12.5 hours Monday through Friday and 10 hours on Saturdays. Workers were not compensated for the two 30-minute meal breaks each day.

In September 1874, wages were reduced by 10 percent. In October, hours were briefly reduced to 10 per day to comply with the law. A slowdown in orders led to layoffs of about 400 of the 700 employees. For those who remained, hours returned to 65.5 per week, in violation of the statute.

On March 2, 1875, workers gathered at Mechanics Hall to decide on a response. The meeting, led by German immigrant and mill hand Andrew Reichell, included over a third of the remaining employees. They voted to submit a letter stating they would not work more than 10 hours per day or 60 hours per week. If management refused, they pledged to strike for at least a month. They also "unanimously voted that no violence be offered to any persons who take their places at the mill."

Royal O. Storrs replied that women could leave after working 60 hours, but he could not guarantee their positions would remain available. Men were required to sign contracts agreeing to the full 65.5-hour schedule. On March 3, the workers walked out in protest. The mills were shut down.

The following day, employees reiterated that their primary concern was not wages, but hours. "We want time to educate ourselves and our children," they stated, "and value that more highly than the pittance we should receive." They also expressed distrust toward Storrs, fearing he would "oppress us still further" if they relented.

A delegation of strikers met with mill owner Charles L. Harding, who promised not to fire women who left after 60 hours. He claimed the business could not remain profitable unless men worked 65.5 hours. As the strike continued, the town's sympathy leaned toward the workers.

A mass meeting at Memorial Hall drew over 1,000 people. E.M. Chamberlain of the National Labor Reform Commission spoke in favor of legally mandating a 10-hour workday for men and an 8-hour day for women and children. He called for mill owners who failed to comply to be prosecuted. John Orvis urged Dedham’s striking workers to join those in Fall River. (Note: Orvis was a founding member of Brook Farm and a champion of the Knights of Labor.) Charles McLean also addressed the crowd. Orvis, McLean, and Chamberlain accompanied the strike’s president, Patrick Hogan, to the podium.

Newspapers across the region—some as far away as New York City and Philadelphia—offered mixed coverage. Some expressed sympathy for the workers, while others sided with management.

By March 17, most of the strikers had returned to work, unable to financially sustain the walkout. Their demand for a 60-hour workweek was unsuccessful. However, they began organizing in support of a statewide law mandating a 10-hour day for all factory workers. Such a law was enacted in 1880.

== First Privilege ==
=== Dedham Worsted Company ===
The Dedham Worsted Company was incorporated principally by William Phillips and Jabez Chickering in 1822. After Chickering sold his carding factory at the fourth privilege, he moved to the first privilege to begin a factory spinning worsted. Almost all worsted at this time was imported from England. This was one of the first worsted factories in the United States, and possibly the only one of its kind. The industry would not grow in the United States until the 1830s.

The factory included a "new through built three story brick Factory... a new wooden store, and block of two Dwelling-houses." The company initially prospered, but it collapsed just two years later when Chickering was discovered to have stolen money and run off to Michigan.

=== Dedham Woolen Mills ===
The Dedham Woolen Mills were established in 1824 by Benjamin Bussey, who acquired land, machinery, and water rights from the defunct Dedham Worsted Company and combined them with his Norfolk Cotton Company holdings. In doing so, he created Mother Brook’s first successful woolen mill and its first fully integrated textile operation, where carding, spinning, weaving, fulling, and dyeing took place under one roof. The mill also became one of the first producers of broadcloth in the region.

To increase water power, Bussey lowered the dam at the second privilege and expanded the brick mill building. The facility eventually became the most sophisticated on Mother Brook, powered by water wheels and peat-fired steam engines. By 1832, the mill had $40,000 worth of cast iron machinery, processed 375,000 pounds of wool, and employed 262 workers. A fire damaged the dye house in 1827.

Labor at the mills initially relied on children, but newer, heavier machines required stronger operators. As a result, Bussey hired unmarried Yankee women aged 15 to 25. In 1827, about 60 women worked at the mill, earning $0.60 per day compared to $0.90 paid to men.

In September 1827, President John Quincy Adams toured the mills and noted that profits were modest, with Bussey pursuing the venture for "patriotic motives." The mills were also notable for their wide market reach, selling cloth across the country and to the frontier through A.A. Lawrence & Co., one of Massachusetts' most significant textile agents.

=== Maverick Woolen Mills ===
Following Bussey's 1842 death, his woolen mill was sold in November 1843 to John Wiley Edmands, one of the partners in the company that served as the mill's selling agent, Amos & Abbot Lawrence. The land was purchased for $30,000 while the machinery, the stock, and materials were sold for more than $45,000. In 1850, he sold half of the company to Gardner Colby. Edmands retained Thomas Barrows as the day-to-day supervisor of the mill. William H. Mann was the bookkeeper. (Note: Mann was also the organist at St. Paul's, the First Church and Parish in Dedham, and at the Baptist Church in East Dedham. Mann lived on Court Street. He learned the trade of a printer.) For the first two years, the overseer was Daniel Pond and then, in 1868, Royal O. Storrs took over. (Note: Pond was from a Rhode Island family with many Dedham connections. He was hired in 1863 at a salary of $10,000 a year.)

The partners continued to expand the physical plant and the types of fabric the mills could produce. They added "fancy cassimeres" woven in multiple colors, prints on their satinets, and doeskin. They constructed the brick building today standing next to Condon Park at 202 Bussey St. (Note: The building was erected sometime before 1855.) A smokestack towered high above the mill.

==== Fires ====
The Maverick Woolen Mill suffered two fires, one in 1854 and one in 1859. The 1854 fire destroyed a storehouse, a press room, and an office. The later fire caused $75,000 in damage. It burned down two wooden structures that housed the spinning and carding departments and a dye house. It also destroyed a four boiler engine that produced 40 horsepower along with the gas element. The Dedham Gas Company was located next door to the mill.

=== Merchant's Woolen Company ===
==== Ownership and staff ====
In 1863, Colby and Edmands took in new partners, including Charles L. Harding, (Note: Charles Harding was also the selling agent for the Arlington Mills and the vice president of the National Association of Wool Manufacturers.) to form the Merchant Woolen Company. By this point, the owners of the mills were no longer local men, but outside investors.

Harding, along with Gardner Roberts Colby, Gardner Colby's son, were the selling agents for the mill. They had an office in New York. Another was in Boston, run by Edgar Harding, Charles's son. (Note: Edgar Harding was a director of North National Bank of Boston, director of Whitman Mills, president of the Manomet Mills. He was also a director of the Rutland Railroad. He was the agent of Arlington Mills, the Eddystone Print Works, and the Southern Cotton Yarn Mills. He had a winter home in Boston, and a summer home in Woods Hole.) The Hardings gradually increased the share of the business they owned. When the younger Colby died, they became the sole owners. Charles then became the president and Edgar was the treasurer.

The weaving operation at the mill was overseen by George Hewitt. (Note: Hewitt was an English immigrant. He opened a grocery store at 23 Milton Street in a building he shared with the East Dedham branch of the Dedham Public Library.) When The New York Times wrote about them in 1887, it described the company as "one of the largest [industrial operations] in the state" with nearly 500 employees. At peak production, there would be more than 1,000 employees.

When President Grover Cleveland reduced tariffs on raw wool and finished products, the market was flooded with imports. Not only were they cheaper. They were also lighter, making them more popular with consumers.

For years the mill struggled, operating for long stretches with a greatly reduced workforce or shut down completely. The mill was the largest employer in the town, and shutdowns caused hardships for many. Many left Dedham in search of work elsewhere.

Charles Harding died in 1893 and Edgar Harding became the sole owner. He put the mill up for sale within 18 months of his father's death. It was purchased by Edward D. Thayer, a wealthy mill owner from Worcester. Thayer also leased the Norfolk Mill. He rehired Parker Colburn Kirk as the agent. Kirk, who lived on Mt. Vernon Street, had previously worked as the superintendent of the Merchant Mill from 1875 to 1883 and was very popular in the community.

When Thayer unexpectedly died in 1907, the mill closed.

==== Facilities ====
Merchant Woolen Company greatly expanded the mills on the first and second privileges. They built a four story, steam powered complex on what is today Condon Park. It had six buildings all connected by a number of passageways. There were also several external buildings housing the engine room, die house, coal house, box shop, wagon sheds, and storerooms. It had a bell that could be heard throughout the neighborhood and dominated the skyline. The complex stood for 75 years.

In the new facility, the entire process of spinning wool into fabric was self-contained and scaled up to increase production. The new company also expanded their offerings of fabrics with the new factory.

The new company purchased the Maverick Woolen Mills and, by 1872, all of the other mills and all of the water power on Mother Brook. By the 1870s, the Merchant's Woolen Company had monopolized all of the water in Mother Brook. In 1870, they were the largest taxpayer in Dedham.

==== Strikes ====
While the 1875 strike was the biggest strike the mill faced, it was not the only one. When wages were cut just before Christmas 1884, just a few weeks after the mill was reopened, and then cut again early in the new year, a dozen employees walked off the job; they were replaced with others. After Thayer purchased the mill, in January 1875, he required weavers to run two looms instead of one. They struck for higher wages, with 190 walking off the job.

==== Accidents and deaths ====
In December 1881, a card of cotton caught fire when a piece of flying waste wafted into a lighted gas jet. The Dedham Fire Department was not called out as male employees used fire buckets to extinguish the flames, which spread to other cards, costing about $800 in damages.

Accidents in which employees got caught in machinery and were either disfigured or died were common. In 1870, Charles Lips died when "one side of his head was crushed out of all semblance to humanity and his body was shockingly mangled." He got caught in a machine and pulled through a space that was 8" by 24". The 32-year-old Prussian immigrant additionally had his feet ripped off of his legs.

The next year, a 15-year-old boy, Charles Cerlack, lost his arm after it was crushed in gearing after his jacket was caught in it. His father, who was poor, asked the factory owners for some aid for his disabled son but was refused. In 1873, John Hennesy broke both arms when his hands were caught in a drum and dragged in. Annie Conlon suffered a puncture wound when a shuttle shot out of a loom and the sharp steel point embedded itself in her leg.

Two Italian dye works employees, Atta Massanosse and Frank Bepelagus, beat an overseer with an iron bar in 1909.

=== Hodges Finishing Company ===
The Hodges Finishing Company purchased the mill at the first privilege from the Merchants' Woolen Company in 1909. The company was run by a variety of members of the Hodges family, including William H. as president, Walter E. as vice president, Frederick H. as secretary, and Frank B. as treasurer. Frank and Frederick both lived in East Dedham.

The company, which bleached and finished textiles produced elsewhere, also made metal and rubber faced type. With six boilers, it could produce 35,000 yards per day.

It employed around 300 people in 1921, but competition from other companies reduced this to about 150 employees the following year. The company shut down by the end of the decade. The company had an office in New York City at 320 Broadway, and officially dissolved in 1938.

=== Condon Park ===
The mill, which was "anything but modern," was torn down in July 1938, with the walls knocked into the foundation. It has stood empty for many years by the time it was destroyed.

It consisted of at least 13 buildings, all connected to the others, most of which were four or five stories tall. There were also a variety of other outbuildings used for storage and fuel. Only Factory Building 2, which later became 202 Bussey St, remained as of 2024. There were efforts to save the mill's weathervane, which had sentimental value to the neighborhood, but it disappeared with the rubble.

When East Dedham Square was revitalized in the 1960s, Condon Park moved to the site from its location at the corner of Bussey Street and Saw Mill Lane.

=== First privilege chronological chart ===
The first privilege was located next to present-day Condon Park, at the corner of Bussey St and Colburn St.

Year	Owner	Manager	Product	Image
1641	John Elderkin		Corn	
1642	50%: Nathaniel Whiting, 50% John Allin, Nathaniel Aldis, John Dwight		Corn	
1649	Nathaniel Whiting		Corn	
1652	John Dwight, Francis Chickering, Joshua Fisher, John Morse		Corn	
1653	Nathaniel Whiting		Corn	
1821	Dedham Worsted Company		Worsted	
1824	Dedham Woolen Mills	Benjamin Bussey, owner; Thomas Barrows, superintendent; and George H. Kuhn, treasurer.	Wool	
1843	Maverick Woolen Mills	J. Wiley Edmands, owner	Wool	
1863	Merchants Woolen Company	J. Wiley Edmands, Gardner Colby, and Charles L. Harding, owners; later, Edward D. Thayer.	Wool	Map showing the mill from 1885
1909	Hodge's Finishing Company	Fred H. Hodges (Note: Chas. О. Brightman, Pres; Fred H. Hodges, Sec and Supt.; Frank B. Hodges, Treas. and Buyer.)	Bleach and Finish Cotton Pieces; Metal and Rubber Faced Type	Map showing the mill from July 1909
1938–Present Day	Condon Park		N/A	

== Second Privilege ==
=== Norfolk Cotton Manufactory ===
Incorporated in 1807, the Norfolk Cotton Manufactory established a spinning mill at the second privilege of Mother Brook, replacing a leather mill on what is now Maverick Street. The company was founded by 30 local investors—primarily professionals and tradesmen from Dedham’s First Parish—who promoted domestic textile manufacturing as a patriotic alternative to foreign imports. Their incorporation petition emphasized national economic independence and was granted along with a $120,000 capital investment and exemption from taxation.

The mill complex grew to include a three-story spinning factory, housing for workers, and auxiliary structures for dyeing, bleaching, and weaving. Raw cotton shipped from the South was partly processed in private homes—primarily by children—before being returned to the mill for spinning. Products were sold directly at the site and through external selling agents, and the company later expanded its offerings to include satinet.

The manufactory thrived initially, benefiting from high demand and favorable trade conditions under the Embargo Act of 1807. However, the War of 1812 disrupted cotton supply chains, and the business struggled under inexperienced leadership. After the war, the influx of higher-quality and cheaper imported textiles contributed to the company’s collapse. In 1819, industrialist Benjamin Bussey acquired the mill and its assets for $12,500—significantly below its previous valuation.

The manufactory also figured prominently in early 19th-century water rights disputes. Downstream mill owners alleged insufficient flow from the second privilege, prompting an agreement in 1811 that fixed the permitted water level, still marked today on the brook’s banks.

=== 20th and 21st centuries ===
In 1909, William B. Pratt purchased the land at the corner of High and Maverick Streets at the second privilege. There he set up an experimental chemistry lab.

The Dedham Finishing Company became the new owners in 1917. The substantially rebuilt the building, and expanded it over a pier that extended over the Brook. There the died, starched, and finished textiles that were produced elsewhere. They went bankrupt in 1932.

Three years later, the Boston Envelope Company purchased and again expanded the site. They produced 800,000 envelopes a day when it opened. Among the products made there were ration books and draft board notices during World War II.

Boston Envelope owned and maintained a park on the other side of Maverick Street, at the corner of High, with well tended gardens. Children swimming in Mill Pond, just downstream, would become temporarily tinted from the dyes the company would dump into the water.

After the Boston Envelope Company closed in 1984, it was purchased by AliMed, a medical devices company. AliMed owned the land as of 2024.

=== Second privilege chronological chart ===
The second privilege was located at present-day Maverick Street.

Year	Owner	Manager	Product	Image
1664	Ezra Morse	Ezra Morse	Corn	
Early 1700s	Joseph Lewis		Leather	
1807	Norfolk Cotton Manufactory	30 local investors	Cotton	
1819	Norfolk Cotton Manufactory	Benjamin Bussey, owner	Cotton	
1824	Dedham Woolen Mills	Benjamin Bussey, owner; Thomas Barrows, superintendent; and George H. Kuhn, treasurer.	Wool	
1843	Maverick Woolen Company	Thomas Barrows, owner; William H. Mann, bookkeeper. (Note: Mann lived on Court Street. He also played the organ at the First Church and Parish in Dedham, St. Paul's Church, and at the Baptist Church in East Dedham.)	Wool	
1863	Merchants Woolen Company	J. Wiley Edmands, Gardner Colby, and Charles L. Harding, owners.	Wool	Map showing the mill in 1892
1895	Merchants Woolen Company	Edward D. Thayer	Wool	Map showing the mill from 1897
1909	William B. Pratt		Experimental chemistry lab	
1917	Dedham Finishing Company			Map showing the mill from September 1917
1936 (Note: It closed before 1976 as Hanson refers to it as "the old Boston Envelope Company Building.")	Boston Envelope Company		Envelopes and other paper goods	
1984-Present Day	AliMed		Medical products and supplies	Mill Pond with Canada geese as seen from Bussey St. AliMed can be seen in the background.

== Third privilege ==
The third privilege was located at present-day Saw Mill Lane.

A mill was first constructed at this site in 1682 by James Draper and Nathaniel Whiting, who already owned the mill at the first privilege. Whiting had previously feuded with the owner of the second privilege over competition for both water and customers.

Permission to build the mill was originally requested by Draper and Jonathan Fairbanks, but it was ultimately granted to Draper and Whiting, likely to avoid further conflict with Whiting. A condition of the grant allowed the Town to erect a corn mill at its own expense if Draper and Whiting failed to do so. Whiting died on the same day the rights were granted.

The mill built at this site was used for fulling wool and is considered the first textile mill in Dedham. The Whiting family retained ownership for over 180 years. When one of their mills burned in 1700, the Town loaned the owner £20 to rebuild.

Over the years, several mills operated at this privilege. By the mid-19th century, one was used in part for cabinet making and possibly hat production. A grist mill and a sawmill were also added, the latter around 1700.

In 1863, the site was purchased by the Merchants Woolen Company. Ownership transferred to Thomas Barrows in 1864, and returned to the company in 1872. In 1875, it was sold to Royal O. Storrs & Company, which went bankrupt in 1882, prompting the Merchants Woolen Company to reacquire it in 1883.

During this period, the site also housed a saw and grist mill managed by Charles C. Sanderson beginning in 1868, and later by the Goding Brothers, who left in 1885. Their departure marked the end of corn milling at the site—a use the brook had supported for more than 240 years. Afterward, the third privilege was merged into the fourth privilege under a single fall.

=== Third privilege chronological chart ===
Year	Owner	Manager	Image
1682	Nathaniel Whiting and James Draper		
1682-1863	Descendants of Nathaniel Whiting		
1863	Merchants Woolen Company	John Wiley Edmands and Gardner Colby	
1864	Thomas Barrows		
1872	Merchants Woolen Company	Between 1868 and 1885, first Charles C. Sanderson then Goding Brothers	
1875	Royal O. Storrs & Company		
1883	Merchants Woolen Company		
1885	Merged with fourth privilege		
Present day	Strip mall and Dunkin' Donuts		

== Fourth privilege ==
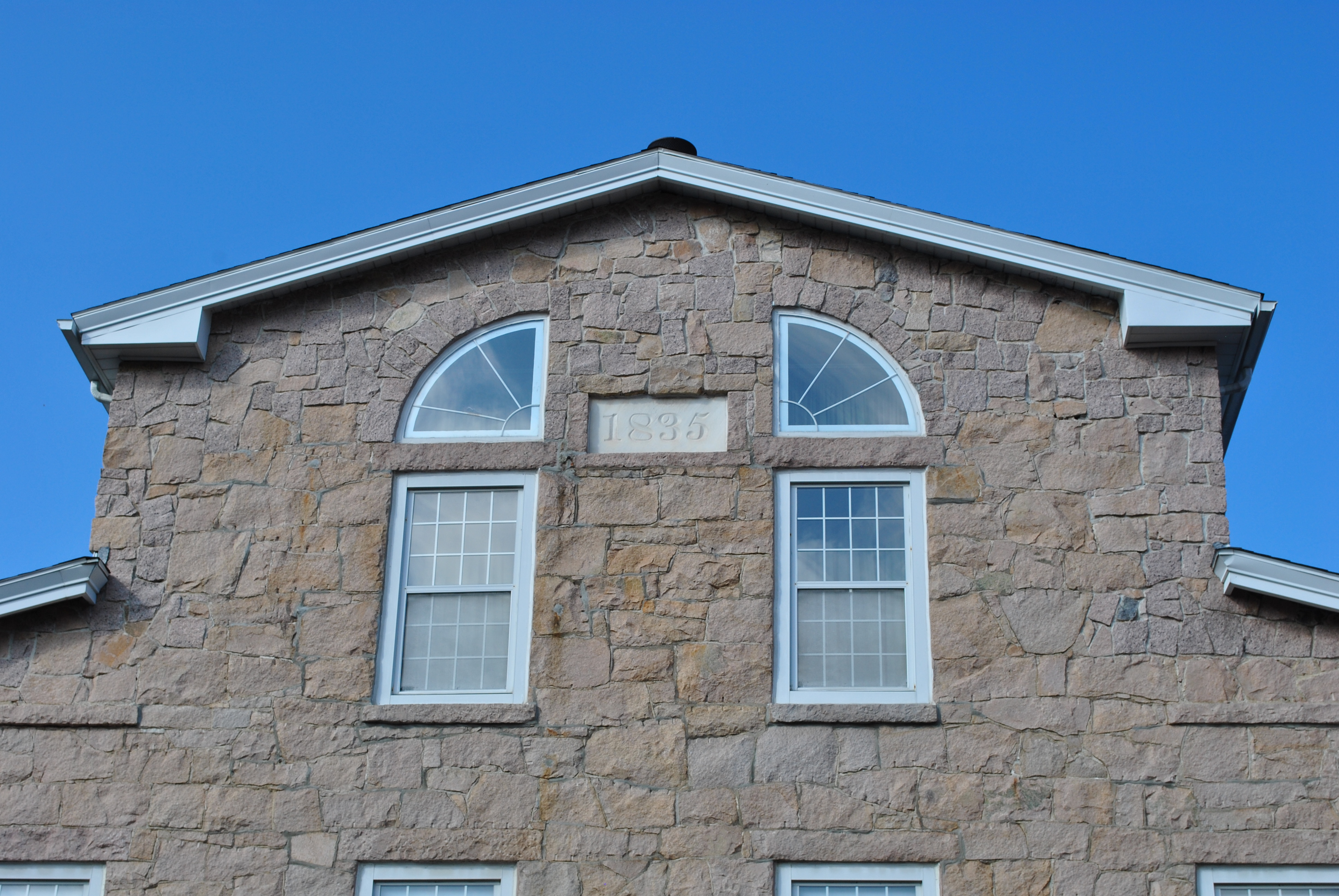
Detail of Stone Mill condo showing "1835" stone

Throughout the 19th century, the fourth privilege hosted a wide variety of industries, including the production of copper cents, paper, cotton, wool, carpets, and handkerchiefs. The site often supported multiple mills, some of which failed within months. After the first mill burned in 1809, it was rebuilt with a new foundation and raceway. The 1835 stone mill built by the Norfolk Manufacturing Company still stands and was converted into a condominium complex in 1986–87.

Ownership of the buildings, businesses, and water rights changed hands frequently, eventually shifting from local to outside investors.

=== American currency ===
The fourth mill privilege, located at present-day Stone Mill Drive just downstream from the third, was established in 1787 by Aaron Whiting, Joseph Whiting Jr., and Paul Moses. (Note: The two Whitings were descendants of Nathaniel Whiting.) The property had originally been part of the 1682 grant that created the third privilege, but at some point the land rights reverted to the town. Just two days after acquiring the land and water rights for £6, the partners sold or leased a quarter share to Captain Joshua Witherle for £25, earning a profit of more than 1,500%. (Note: Witherle, a Boston resident, was the principal partner in a coppersmith company. He died in 1806, and his son later sold the business.)

In 1787, the Great and General Court of Massachusetts authorized the creation of a state currency. Witherle was appointed Master of the Mint and constructed a mint house behind his Boston residence. To support coin production, he also built a rolling mill at the fourth privilege on Mother Brook. There, he melted copper—much of it repurposed from Revolutionary War-era cannons and mortars—and cast it into ingots. The ingots were transported to Dedham, where they were rolled into plates, then returned to Boston to be struck and stamped into one-cent coins.

Although Witherle assured the Commonwealth in May 1787 that he was "ready... immediately to proceed," no coins had been produced by January 1788. When summoned by the Governor's Council, he cited difficulties in sourcing appropriate materials and training workers for what was then a new industry in Massachusetts.

=== Mann and Poor ===
In April 1799, Herman Mann and Daniel Poor leased a mill at the fourth privilege and began operating a paper manufacturing business. Their partnership was short-lived, lasting only six months, after which Poor continued the operation on his own. In 1801, the mill was sold at a sheriff's auction, likely due to Poor defaulting on the lease.

=== George Bird ===
In 1804, George Bird, a seasoned paper manufacturer originally from Maine, acquired the fourth privilege mill at a sheriff's auction following the financial default of Daniel Poor. Bird rebuilt the mill after it burned down in 1809 and resumed paper production. Around the same time, he partnered with Ruggles Whiting to manufacture wire until 1814.

Bird then leased the mill to Arnold Wells of Dorchester, who used the site for nail production until 1819. That year, Bird purchased all the buildings, water rights, and land associated with the fourth privilege for $8,000, consolidating his ownership of the site. While continuing to operate a paper mill, he leased part of the facility to Jabez Chickering for a wool carding operation managed by an Englishman known only as Mr. Miller.

=== Norfolk Manufacturing Company ===
The Norfolk Manufacturing Company began operations at the fourth privilege in 1823 under the ownership of George Bird and Frederick A. Taft. They appointed Calvin Guild as the manager. (Note: Guild also was an officer of the Dedham Historical Society and the treasurer of the Dedham Institution for Savings. He was the fifth of 10 children and descended from one of the original settlers of Dedham. For many years he was the manager of the Norfolk Manufacturing Company's mill on Mother Brook.) An experienced cotton manufacturer from Uxbridge, Massachusetts, Taft consolidated multiple properties at the site with the help of Boston-based investors and placed control of the operation with his brother, Ezra W. Taft, who lived in Dedham.

By 1827, the company employed between 200 and 300 workers and was producing 50 to 60 bolts of cloth each week. The machinery ran 14 hours a day, using equipment previously operated by the Norfolk Cotton Factory at the first privilege. In 1830, John Lemist and Frederick A. Taft served as managers. The paper mill on the site burned in 1832 and again in 1843, becoming the fourth mill at that location to be destroyed by fire.

In 1832, management transitioned to Lemist and Ezra W. Taft. In 1835, the current stone mill was constructed using Dedham Granite. The new building measured 100 feet long by 40 feet wide, stood three stories tall, and featured a gable roof with a clerestory monitor that illuminated the attic. A bell tower with columns and a domed cupola capped the structure. Under Ezra W. Taft’s leadership, the corporation prospered, eventually producing 650,000 yards of cotton annually. Taft remained the company’s agent and manager for approximately 30 years.

An adjacent building, unused by the company, was leased beginning in 1846 by Edward Holmes and Thomas Dunbar for a wheelwright business that operated using steam power. On July 17, 1846, Taft’s paper mill burned down.

=== Barrows Mill ===
During the American Civil War, mills across the North lost access to Southern cotton due to a Confederate embargo and a Union Navy blockade. In response, many facilities—including those on Mother Brook—converted to wool production to meet the federal government's demand for uniforms, blankets, and other supplies.

Thomas Barrows, a retired manufacturer who had previously made his fortune producing woolen goods on Mother Brook, returned to the industry during the war. He purchased the former Norfolk Cotton Manufacturing Company’s mill at the fourth privilege, which had been idle since the war began. The facility, previously known as Taft's Mill, became known as Barrows Mill.

Barrows expanded the 1835 stone building by adding a wing constructed of matching Dedham Granite, set at a right angle to the original structure. He installed a Corliss steam engine, a high-efficiency steam engine patented in 1849, and retrofitted the facility for wool production.

By 1868, Barrows Mill was producing woolen cassimere, a finely woven cloth used for menswear. After the war, however, the market for wool declined due to reduced demand and broader economic challenges. In response to these conditions, Barrows sold the property to the Merchants Woolen Company, which already operated mills at several other privileges along Mother Brook, in 1872.

=== Storrs & Company ===
Following Barrows’s tenure, the fourth privilege entered a brief but turbulent chapter under new ownership.

In 1875, Royal O. Storrs, previously the overseer of the Merchants Woolen Mill, purchased the facility along with 13 acres of land, tenements, storehouses, and water rights to the fourth privilege. He paid Charles and Edgar Harding $60,000 and renamed the enterprise Storrs & Company. The mill produced beaver cloth and cassimere, with Patrick O. Kirk appointed as overseer of the Bussey Street facility at the first privilege.

In 1882, Storrs was found to have falsified financial records and accumulated $437,500 in debt. He declared bankruptcy before a standing-room-only audience at the Norfolk County Courthouse. A sheriff was appointed to oversee operations until the remaining inventory was exhausted.

Storrs later settled out of court, and by March 1883, the Merchants Woolen Company—now operating under the name Norfolk Mills—had regained ownership of the property. The financial collapse of Storrs & Company marked another turning point in the mill’s long industrial history, leading to renewed control by the previous operators.

=== Cochrane Mill ===
After the previous business closed, the stone mill at the fourth privilege was purchased in 1897 by the Cochrane Manufacturing Company, owned by J. Eugene Cochrane of Malden. The company produced and dyed carpets, lace curtains, and handkerchiefs.

Over the next six years, the facilities were expanded and modernized. In addition to constructing new brick and wooden buildings, the company added a granite extension to the original mill using locally quarried Dedham Granite. The use of the more costly stone suggests the building was already regarded as a local landmark. The company also raised the dam by eight feet to increase water power and unified the third and fourth privileges.

On April 4, 1911, a fire broke out and destroyed the original 1835 gambrel roof and the 1863 mansard roof on the wing. At the time, 25 women were inside the mill on their lunch break, including one napping on the third floor; all escaped unharmed. Within 30 minutes, the main building was engulfed in flames, and sparks ignited the roofs of nearby structures.

The mill was quickly rebuilt with flat roofs, but without its original bell cupola. The Cochrane Manufacturing Company ceased operations during the Great Depression.

=== United Waste Company ===
In 1937, the United Waste Company, owned by Benjamin Segal, purchased the mill. The facility was adapted to reprocess wool and mixed fibers into padding and shoddy, as well as other reclaimed fabrics. This form of cloth recycling was described by Neiswander as "the lowest end of textile manufacturing," reflecting the overall decline of the industry in New England by that time. It marked the final known industrial use of the property.

Various sections of the mill complex had burned in fires throughout the 1980s including a major fire on May 2, 1984.

=== Condominiums ===
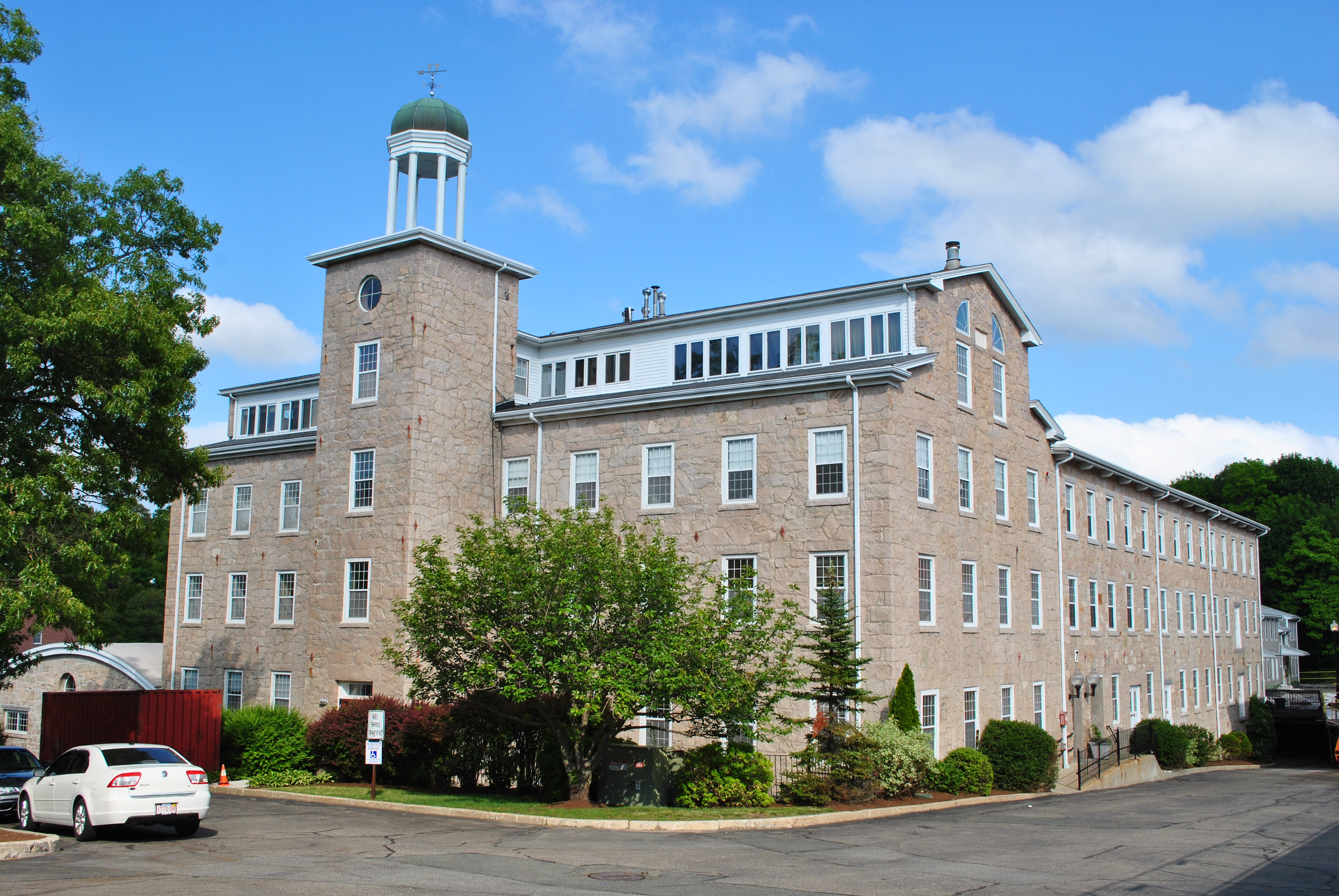
Stone Mill condos

In 1986, the Bergmeyer Development Company purchased the fire-damaged mill complex for $1.6 million and began converting it into 86 condominium units. While the interior was renovated for residential use, the exterior retained its 19th-century appearance. The developers rebuilt the gambrel roof and restored the bell tower cupola, although the mansard roof was not reconstructed. The general contractor for the project was the Kaplan Corp., the landscape architects were Weinmayr Associates, and financing was provided by the Mutual Bank. A 25-foot waterfall runs through the complex. As of the present day, the property is known as the Stone Mill Condominiums.

=== Fourth privilege chronological chart ===
Owner	Years owned	Manager or lessee	Product produced	Image
Aaron Whiting, Joseph Whiting Jr., and Paul Moses	1787	Captain Joshua Witherle	Copper blanks for state currency	
Herman Mann and Daniel Poor	1799–1801		Paper	
George Bird	1804–1819	Ruggles Whiting, Arnold Wells	Paper, wire, nails	
George Bird	1819–1823	Jabez Chickering (lessee), Mr. Miller (superintendent)	Paper, wool carding	
George Bird and Frederick A. Taft (Norfolk Manufacturing Company)	1823–1840s	Calvin Guild, John Lemist, Ezra W. Taft	Cotton	
Thomas Barrows	Civil War era–1872		Woolen cassimere	
Royal O. Storrs (Storrs & Co.)	1875–1882	Patrick O. Kirk (Bussey Street overseer)	Beaver cloth, cassimere	
Merchants Woolen Company (d/b/a Norfolk Mills)	1883–1897		Wool	
Cochrane Manufacturing Company	1897–1930s	J. Eugene Cochrane	Carpets, handkerchiefs, lace curtains	
United Waste Company	1937–1986	Benjamin Segal	Shoddy wool, padding, cloth recycling	
Bergmeyer Development Co.	1986–present	Kaplan Corp. (GC), Weinmayr Associates (landscape)	Residential condominiums	Centennial Dam and Stone Mill condos

== Fifth privilege ==
=== Dedham Manufacturing Company ===
In 1814, a fifth privilege was granted in what was then Dedham, now part of the Readville neighborhood in Hyde Park, at the corner of Knight and River Streets. (Note: Readville, known as early as 1655 as the Low Plain and later as Dedham Low Plain, was settled the same year the privilege was granted, when the Dedham Manufacturing Company built a mill there. James Read, one of the original proprietors, became the neighborhood’s namesake when it officially became Readville on October 8, 1847.) That year, James Read and several partners opened the Dedham Cotton Manufacturing Company, constructing a three-story wooden spinning mill.

The company was incorporated by President David S. Greenough, Samuel Dexter, William Gray, Aaron Davis, Charles Davis, John Grew, and John Guild. These men were primarily outside investors rather than local entrepreneurs, and their combined investment of $500,000 was exceptionally large for the time.

The 36×170-foot mill was oriented perpendicular to the brook and featured a bell in its street-facing gable to mark the beginning and end of the workday. A dam and race powered the waterwheel, which carded and spun cotton delivered by local residents who picked, whipped, and wove it at home.

The company’s manager was James Richardson of Dedham, one of the original incorporators. Its first superintendent was Frederick A. Taft, (Note: Taft was from Uxbridge, Massachusetts.) who was later succeeded by his brother, Ezra Taft.

After initial struggles, the company eventually prospered. In 1817, it installed the first power loom on Mother Brook, and in 1833, the equipment was upgraded to produce finer printed fabrics. By 1827, the mill employed 70 workers and produced 6,000 yards of cloth each week. In 1832, it employed 45 people, consumed 75,000 pounds of cotton annually, and had machinery valued at $10,000. Its textiles were sold throughout New England, although women workers earned $0.45 per day—about one-third less than their male counterparts.

In 1840, shareholders received a 10 percent semiannual dividend. By 1847, James Read, who was both treasurer and the company’s largest shareholder, had acquired full control by buying out the other investors. Through his firm, Read and Chadwick, he also served as a selling agent for the company and five other cotton mills.

=== Late 1800s ===
The Dedham Manufacturing Company closed in 1861 when soaring cotton prices, driven by the Civil War, made production unprofitable. A group of investors—Tully D. Bowen, Earle P. Mason, Henry Waterman, John A. Taft, Stephen Harris, Cyrus Harris, Joseph Woods, John A. Adams, and Benjamin Sibley—purchased the mill in 1867.

The Smithfield Manufacturing Company of Rhode Island acquired the mill in 1875. They constructed new brick mills on the site but later lost them to foreclosure.

In 1877, (Note: Worthington lists the year as 1879.) the property was purchased by industrialists Robert and Benjamin Knight of B.B. & R. Knight Cotton. The Knights rebuilt the dam, installed new water wheels, and made other improvements to the site.

=== Francis W. Smith ===
Francis W. Smith purchased the mill in 1922. A real estate investor rather than a manufacturer, Smith closed the mill soon after acquiring it. (Note: The closure occurred sometime before 1927, during a broader "textile depression.")

At the time of the sale, the main building was constructed of brick and measured 331 feet long by an average of 59 feet wide. Several additional parcels and structures were included in the transaction, such as tenement housing and a superintendent’s residence.

The facility’s equipment inventory was extensive, including an automatic opener, five lapper machines, 108 cards, seven drawing frames, 29 fly frames, 77 spinning frames, five pairs of mules, 15 spooling frames, warper frames, a slasher, 508 plain looms, cloth room equipment, and a waste picker house unit. It also had machine shop equipment and miscellaneous cotton machinery that had never been used onsite. Much of this surplus equipment was packed for shipment to Japan and included additional openers, cards, ring spinning frames, mules, winders, reels, and bobbins.

=== Fifth privilege chronological chart ===
The fifth privilege was located at the corner of Knight St. and River St. in Readville.

Year	Owner	Manager	Product
1814	Dedham Manufacturing Company		Cotton
1867	Nine men (Note: A company of men composed of Tully D. Bowen, Earle P. Mason, Henry Waterman, John A. Taft, Stephen Harris, Cyrus Harris, Joseph Woods, John A. Adams, and Benjamin Sibley.)		Cotton
1875	Smithfield Manufacturing Company		Cotton
1879	Royal C. Taft		Cotton
1879	B.B. & R. Knight Cotton	Manchaug Company	Cotton
1922	Francis W. Smith		The mill was expected to be closed and leveled. (Note: It was, in fact, closed sometime prior to 1927, as were many others, in a "textile depression.")
Present day	Part of Stony Brook Reservation		

== Conflict with Charles River mills and farmers ==
As Dedham industrialized and became increasingly reliant on the flow of water from Mother Brook, other communities along the Charles River developed similar dependencies. To increase the volume diverted into the brook, mill owners deepened and widened the channel at various times. This periodic drawdown led to frequent conflicts with downstream mill owners who depended on the Charles, as well as with farmers whose land along the Charles and Neponset Rivers was damaged by erosion or flooding. Farmers also objected to industrialists receiving tax exemptions granted by the Commonwealth to encourage manufacturing.

The earliest documented protest came in 1767, when mill owners in Newton and Watertown petitioned to restrict the brook’s diversion. A sill was installed to regulate the flow. By 1797, additional petitions from Needham, Roxbury (now West Roxbury), and Newton urged the legislature to restore the river’s full volume. In 1809, these stakeholders formed a trade association to assert their rights. They argued that the brook’s diversion violated public trust principles and diminished the Charles’s flow.

Dedham’s mill owners countered that the Charles was often too shallow, blaming upstream dams for reduced water levels. They also gained the support of Neponset River manufacturers, who benefited from the extra water. That same year, a special act of the Great and General Court incorporated the Mother Brook Mill-Owners Association on September 1, 1809.

Both sides appealed to the Massachusetts Supreme Judicial Court. In March 1809, the court appointed three Commissioners of Sewers to assess the dispute. (Note: Elijah Brigham, Jonas Kendall, and Loammi Baldwin were appointed in October 1809.) As the original sill had disappeared, a new regulatory system was introduced. The court permitted one-quarter of the Charles River’s flow to be diverted into Mother Brook, though Dedham mill owners secured a stay of that ruling.

The commission’s report was not filed for another 12 years. When it was finally submitted, the brook’s proprietors objected, and the report was set aside. In 1825, the court declared the report outdated and incomplete. After new negotiations, a final settlement was reached on December 3, 1831. It allocated one-third of the Charles’s flow to Mother Brook and the remaining two-thirds to downstream users. This agreement—reaffirmed in 1955—resolved decades of litigation and remained in effect as of 2017.

The dispute generated pointed commentary. In 1895, one critic described the brook’s creation as "the most audacious attempt of robbery ever recorded in the Commonwealth of Massachusetts," accusing Dedham of attempting to "actually steal the river Charles." In 1915, observers estimated that one-third of the Charles River’s flow passed into Mother Brook; by 1938, that figure had increased to one-half. In 1993, an average of 51 million gallons per day entered the brook from the Charles, with the rate modifiable based on downstream needs.

== Life along Mother Brook ==
By the 1800s, as regional and national prosperity increased, mills along Mother Brook began producing goods for markets beyond Dedham and nearby communities. By the 1820s, operations had grown so profitable that some local landowning farmers feared they were losing political influence in town. (Note: Farmers were contending with two emerging centers of power: one stemming from Dedham’s designation as the shiretown in 1793, which brought an influx of lawyers, politicians, and county business; the other from the rising influence of mill owners and workers.)

Industrial development was particularly concentrated around each water privilege. Some sites featured not just mills, but also dye houses and worker residences, leading Neiswander to describe them as resembling self-contained villages.

=== Mill Village ===
The early mills along Mother Brook typically employed only two or three individuals and operated seasonally. Grist mills were busiest during the autumn harvest, while sawmills were most active in winter and spring, when leafless trees could be felled and hauled by sled over snow.

Industrial development spurred the growth of residential and commercial infrastructure in the surrounding area. Housing for workers was followed by the construction of churches, shops, and other businesses. For over a century, what is now East Dedham was among the most populous and productive neighborhoods in town. Mid-19th-century maps depict a densely settled community with a commercial center, homes, stores, and churches.

By 1799, East Dedham had three inns, several "elegant mansion-homes," and a number of other houses "very decent in appearance." As the population grew, the community—of which about ten residents had received a formal education—was described as "industrious, affable, and charitable."

To protect the growing village, the East Dedham Firehouse was constructed in 1855. In 1837, Benjamin Bussey contributed funds toward a library housed above Boyden’s Store, the local mill store. Known as the Bussey Social and Circulating Library, it was open only to paying members and closed after a few years due to lack of support.

By the mid-19th century, industrial activity had expanded substantially. At its peak, the Merchant’s Woolen Company employed approximately 1,000 people, nearly all of them immigrants. During this period, a small traveling circus visited East Dedham annually. It was especially popular among mill workers, reportedly "surpassing in its manifold attractions even Independence day." Mill owners and town officials, however, expressed concern that the circus drew too much money out of the local economy.

=== Boarding houses and tenements ===
Every mill along Mother Brook built homes for workers and rented them to employees. As mills expanded and hired more laborers, boarding houses became increasingly common. Much of the workforce housing was concentrated in the areas around Maverick Street and Colburn Street. Ten male residents in one such boarding house in 1829 each paid $1.50 per week, while fifteen female residents—referred to as "girls" in contemporary records—paid $1.25 per week. By the mid-1800s, the mills collectively owned 33,000 acres of land in East Dedham.

The Maverick Woolen Company owned six houses near the intersection of Gould and Curve Streets, as well as additional tenements on Bussey and Milton Streets. In 1870, the Merchant’s Woolen Company owned numerous residences, including two on High Street, five on Maverick, ten on Curve, and two "long houses" on Bussey Street. Several of these 19th-century homes still existed as of 2020, including the two long houses at 235 and 241 Colburn Street, built before the street was formally laid out.

Not all rental housing was mill-owned. Many homes were built or purchased by private individuals. One example was George Hewitt’s house at 24–26 Chauncey Street, which housed 13 people in less than 2,000 square feet.

==== Maverick–Colburn triangle ====
By 1876, the Merchant’s Woolen Company had acquired all of the land within the triangle formed by Maverick, Colburn, and Curve Streets. Only a few lots west of Maverick Street or north of Curve Street remained in private hands. According to census data from the 1880s, most residents in this part of East Dedham were Irish-born mill workers. Among them was Timothy O'Calligan, a second-generation American who served as a mill overseer and lived alongside many of the workers he supervised.

==== High Street ====
Benjamin Bussey constructed several boarding houses, including those at 303–305–307 High Street, (Note: This building was referred to as the “lower house.”) 315 High Street, and 59 Maverick Street. The two buildings on High Street were originally connected by an ell, which remained standing at least through 1910. These structures first appeared on insurance maps in 1855 and were later acquired by the Maverick Woolen Company, which also owned additional properties in the neighborhood.

==== Milton Street ====
The houses at 73–75 and 81–83 Milton Street were built by Isaac Whiting on land held by his family since the early 1600s. These were part of a broader pattern of mill-related housing development that transformed the area. Additional residences at 99, 101, 111, and 115 Milton Street were owned by the Merchant’s Woolen Company and leased to mill employees.

==== Bussey Street ====
Just north of Mill Lane, the Maverick Woolen Company constructed two tenement buildings on Bussey Street. (Note: These buildings remained in a dilapidated state until they were demolished during the mid-20th-century urban renewal program.) Unlike the detached or semi-detached houses built earlier, these were block-style dormitories in which between six and eight women shared a single room. Some of these rooms may also have housed newly arrived immigrant families recruited by the mills. In such cases, both parents and children worked to repay the costs of their transatlantic passage.

=== Immigrants ===
As industrialization increased along Mother Brook, mills attracted immigrants from Europe and Canada who sought jobs and better living conditions. By 1827, observers anticipated that the expanding number of mills would continue to draw new laborers to the area. Irish immigrants arrived during the Great Famine in the 1840s, followed by Germans in the 1850s. Later in the 19th century, Italians and other Europeans also made their way to the neighborhood.

Mill owners sometimes recruited entire immigrant families directly from overseas to work in their facilities. Many of these new arrivals were Catholic and became parishioners at St. Mary's Church, which was raising funds for a new building. However, frequent mill shutdowns—sometimes lasting months—left many without income and slowed the church’s fundraising efforts.

While the earliest immigrant workers often had specialized mechanical training, those who arrived after the Civil War tended to be unskilled agricultural laborers fleeing poverty and conflict in Europe. With few financial resources or social connections, they had limited ability to challenge the difficult and sometimes exploitative working conditions in the mills.

== 20th century and the decline of industry ==
A rainbow over Mother Brook as seen from Saw Mill Lane in Dedham, MA

Although the mills continued operating into the 20th century, they were not immune to broader economic forces. In 1900, and even as late as 1915, after "275 years of constant usefulness," the brook remained "the source of the principal business of the town [of Dedham]." By the late 1800s, the mills were "losing ground in the national economic picture, inexorably sliding into an increasingly marginal sort of operation, and finally succumbing entirely to the slump which followed the First World War." The textile industry declined in the 1910s and 1920s, and by 1986 the cotton mills and brick factories that once lined the brook had largely disappeared.

In the 1960s, the pond at the fifth privilege was drained, and the landowner proposed constructing a strip mall on the site. Instead, the Department of Conservation and Recreation (DCR) purchased the property. The DCR removed a junkyard, dredged out accumulated silt and fill, rebuilt the dam, and issued a plan to promote boating, hiking, and other outdoor activities. The plan also proposed building a bathhouse, contingent upon improved water quality. When the Dedham Mall was constructed during this period, a section of the brook was rerouted underground.

=== Infrastructure and preservation ===
A mechanical floodgate was later installed at the brook's mouth to regulate water levels in the Charles River. A small brick building was constructed nearby to house the floodgate controls. In 1978, a proposal was introduced to generate hydroelectric power using the brook's three remaining dams.

=== Pollution ===
During the early 20th century, the state Board of Health began enforcing pollution regulations that prevented additional manufacturing enterprises from establishing operations along Mother Brook, having "resolutely set its decision against the pollution of this stream." One facility was required to install an expensive filtration system to treat its liquid waste before discharge.

In 1910, water pumped by the Town of Hyde Park from Mother Brook was deemed unsafe for use without boiling, and in 1911 the town applied to join the metropolitan water system. By 1944, the Neponset River was described as being "loaded with putrefaction."

In the 1960s, development upstream led to further complications. Marshlands near the headwaters of the brook were reclaimed, partly for flood control. One such area became the site of the Dedham Mall. Runoff from the 150-acre (61 ha) development flowed into the brook and then into the Neponset River, which struggled to handle the increased volume during heavy rain.

By the mid-20th century, "after over 300 years of industrial use, the Mother Brook was intensely polluted." Pollutants included gasoline, polychlorinated biphenyls (PCBs), raw sewage, and other industrial waste. An oil spill of 1,300 gallons was discovered near Milton Street in 1975, and gasoline was found bubbling into the water in 1990. From 1986 to 1994, L. E. Mason Co. was fined $250,000 by the Environmental Protection Agency for discharging trichloroethylene into the brook. The company was also known to have dumped zinc, fats, oils, and greases.

In the 1990s, a science teacher at Dedham High School and her chemistry students conducted water quality tests on the brook. They found the water quality to be generally good, although fecal coliform levels allowed for only partial body contact. Despite improvements, as of 2017, Mother Brook remained one of the most polluted tributaries of the Neponset River. Uniquely, the brook tends to be less polluted during periods of heavy rainfall due to the influx of clean water from the Charles River.

The waterway is monitored by the Neponset River Watershed Association and, as of 2024, is considered clean enough for swimming.

=== Cleanups and maintenance ===
After centuries of industrial use and waste disposal, Mother Brook became heavily polluted. In recent decades, numerous local organizations have coordinated cleanup efforts.

Following the flood of 1955, the Metropolitan District Commission dredged and straightened the channel of Mother Brook between the Charles River and Maverick Street. This work was part of a broader initiative to mitigate flooding along both the Charles and Neponset Rivers. During the project, marshland along the brook was converted into buildable lots.

Later in the decade, several of the brook's dams were rebuilt, and further flood control improvements were carried out during the 1960s and 1970s, particularly downstream of Maverick Street. Responsibility for maintaining the dams belongs to the Department of Conservation and Recreation, with the exception of the Colburn Street dam at the first privilege, which remains under the jurisdiction of the Town of Dedham. The Commonwealth has also assumed ownership of most of the brook’s riverbanks from the Town.

As part of a remediation initiative to address polychlorinated biphenyl (PCB) contamination, the Commonwealth of Massachusetts rerouted the brook beneath Hyde Park Avenue in 2007. This effort later prompted a federal lawsuit regarding the division of cleanup costs.

To ensure long-term infrastructure stability, the Department of Conservation and Recreation announced in 2017 that it would clear trees and overgrown vegetation near the Charles River diversion point. The goal was to stabilize and protect the dam regulating the flow of water from the river into Mother Brook.

== Modern day ==
Mother Brook continues to shape the physical and cultural landscape of Dedham in the 21st century. Once central to the town's industrial development, the brook and its surroundings are now the focus of revitalization and community engagement efforts.

In 1961, an incinerator was constructed on the site of the former bathhouse. The facility was later converted into a trash transfer station, which operated until its closure in 2019. Afterward, the Town of Dedham's Department of Public Works repurposed the building for storage. The town surveyed residents in 2024 to gather input on potential future uses for the site. In March 2025, officials announced that the smokestack and building would be demolished in May.

The brook has given its name to the modern-day Mother Brook Community Group, (Note: The Mother Brook Community Group was founded in 2008.) the Mother Brook Arts and Community Center, Riverside Theatre Works, and the erstwhile Mother Brook Club and Mother Brook Coalition.

At the 2015 Fall Annual Town Meeting, the Town of Dedham established the Mother Brook 375th Anniversary Committee. Members included Dan Hart, Nicole Keane, Brian Keaney, Vicky L. Krukeberg, Charlie Krueger, Gerri Roberts, and Jean Ford Webb.

== National Register of Historic Places ==
In 2009, the Dedham Board of Selectmen proposed designating Mother Brook as a historic waterway to improve its eligibility for grant funding. In the 2010s, the Mother Brook Community Group, East Dedham's neighborhood association, initiated a campaign to have Mother Brook listed on the National Register of Historic Places. The first phase of the effort involved an architectural survey of the brook and its surroundings, conducted by Heritage Consultants and presented in January 2020. The study identified more than 70 buildings, sites, and structures that retained historical connections to the industrial development along the brook.

The survey identified several notable properties:

- 202 Bussey Street, built circa 1855 as the Merchant Woolen Company's Factory Mill No. 2, which housed a carpenter’s shop on the lower level and spinning machines on the upper floors.
- Two private residences on Maverick and High Streets, constructed circa 1825 as boarding houses for employees of the Maverick Woolen Company. In 1829, ten men and fifteen women lived there; room and board cost $1.50 per week for men and $1.25 for women.
- Brookdale Cemetery, established to serve the growing population drawn by the influx of mill workers.

The findings from the survey were submitted to the Massachusetts Historical Commission, which is responsible for evaluating eligibility for the National Register, in 2023. On March 12, 2025, a local historic district—the Mother Brook Lower Mill Pond Historic District—was created, encompassing the mill pond along Colburn Street and twelve adjacent properties. The district was submitted to the National Park Service for formal inclusion on the National Register of Historic Places, and was approved in June 2025. It was the first new historic district in Dedham in more than 30 years, and the first to be created outside of Precinct One.

== Accidents and floods ==
=== Floods ===
In February 1886, Mother Brook overflowed its banks, threatening the integrity of its dams, particularly the structure at Merchant's Mill. There were fears that a dam in Dover would fail, releasing a surge of water strong enough to destroy the dam in Dedham. Before this incident, Merchant's Mill had been considered impregnable. The event was regarded as one of the most significant floods in Dedham Center's history.

In March 1936, floodwaters inundated the Manor section of Dedham, leaving streets under two to three feet of water. A combination of rainfall and melting snow caused both the Charles River and Mother Brook to overflow in 1948, flooding portions of the town.

Ice jams at two dams triggered flooding in 1955. Firefighters used high-pressure hoses to break up an ice jam near Milton Street, while a crane was employed to remove debris and fracture the ice at Maverick Street. These efforts reduced the water level by two feet that day.

Later that year, during what was described as the worst flood in New England’s recorded history, floodwaters from Mother Brook and the Neponset River breached embankments in Hyde Park, forcing 150 residents to evacuate. Boston Mayor John Hynes visited the area to assess the damage. Roads in Dedham, including the V.F.W. Parkway, were submerged. That autumn, the Commonwealth approved $2 million for flood control projects along Mother Brook and the Neponset River. An additional $2 million was approved by the Massachusetts House of Representatives in 1960.

In March 1958, 120 workers deployed 1,200 sandbags at the junction of the Neponset River and Mother Brook in Hyde Park to prevent anticipated flooding. Water levels had already posed threats to homes and roads earlier that January. In 1968, severe flooding forced the evacuation of hundreds of residents along the Charles, Neponset, and Mother Brook. The worst-affected area in Dedham was along Bussey Street.

==== 1938 flood ====
In July 1938, while much of the Charles and Neponset Rivers were already flooding and causing an estimated $3 million in damage, the area surrounding Mother Brook initially remained unaffected. Eventually, however, the brook did overflow. Although dams helped manage the heavy flow, the volume of water—reported at 15,000 units—approached the levels seen in 1936 and was only six inches below the 1920 flood.

Numerous homes in low-lying areas experienced basement flooding. The wooden bridge at Maverick Street came under threat, prompting emergency stabilization using sandbags, an oil truck, and granite slabs. The adjacent Boston Envelope Company had its first floor inundated.

During the flood, three young men attempting to canoe down the Charles River were capsized in a whirlpool and swept into the swollen Mother Brook. A rescuer on East Street ran 500 yards and tossed them a garden hose, successfully pulling them to safety.

=== Drownings and rescues ===
Over the years, numerous accidents have occurred on Mother Brook, including several fatal drownings. (Note: Reported deaths include Michael Ansbro in 1892, John J. Carroll in 1948, Timothy Neville in 1967, and James Colburn. Many victims were children, such as 8-year-old William Hickey in 1899, 14-year-old James Cox in 1969, 2-year-old Fritz Wende in 1927, a 6-year-old boy in 1946, 14-year-old Daniel Linehan in 1951, 2-and-a-half-year-old James Cunningham in 1959, and 13-year-old William Molineaux in 1972. Several children drowned after falling through ice, including an 8-year-old in 1895 and a 7-year-old in 1929.)

In December 1905, 12-year-old James Harnett drowned after attempting to skate across Mill Pond, where the ice was only half an inch thick. His 17-year-old brother, William, tried to save him but also fell through. While William was rescued by a human chain of skaters, James's body was recovered an hour later by police.

In 1980, 8-year-old David Tundidor fell through the ice and remained underwater for 20 minutes. A passing motorist and three others jumped in to help but were unable to locate him. A WHDH radio traffic helicopter broke the ice with its pontoons, allowing Boston firefighters to recover his body. Tundidor was placed in a medically induced coma but died four days later.

Other individuals were more fortunate and were rescued. (Note: Rescued individuals include Katie Murray, age 20, in August 1875, and a 6-year-old boy saved in August 1878 by Arthur Bacon, "a young man who has previously acted in a like noble manner." Also rescued were 11-year-old Thomas Mahoney in 1919, 14-year-old Maud Conant in 1925, and a 12-year-old boy who floated down the brook on a bale of cotton waste in 1953. In 2009, a man was rescued by the Dedham Fire Department after his homemade boat went over the dam separating the Charles River from Mother Brook.) In July 1899, 13-year-old William Dennen dove off a bridge on Emmett Avenue to rescue 7-year-old Mary Bouchard, who had fallen into the water.

In 1916, John F. McGraw, a 33-year-old Scottish immigrant, attempted suicide by jumping into the brook. After going over a dam and landing in shallow water, he climbed ashore and was taken to a psychiatric hospital for evaluation. In February 1983, Paul Flanagan, 23, survived for three and a half hours in the brook after his car plunged into the water. He was treated for hypothermia at Norwood Hospital and later released.

In 1937, two boys reported discovering a human leg in the brook. However, police could not locate either the leg or a body.

=== Other events ===
In April 1878, a balky horse caused a wagon to tip into the brook, sending six people into the water. No injuries were reported. A similar incident occurred in 1837, when a thirsty horse pulling a cart loaded with paper from the mills in Dedham to Braintree plunged into the brook, taking the teamster and his load with him.

In 1911, just moments after departing Dedham Square en route to Forest Hills, a streetcar jumped the tracks on Washington Street and came to rest precariously over the brook with 35 passengers aboard. Only two individuals sustained minor injuries.

In 1938, a group of neighborhood boys rescued a cat trapped in a flooded culvert after the Dedham Fire Department was unable to retrieve it. In 1956, 13-year-old William Sullivan was accidentally shot in the leg by a friend wielding a .32 caliber gun while the two were playing on a raft behind Brookdale Cemetery.

== Bridges ==
After diverting from the Charles River, Mother Brook immediately flows beneath a bridge on Providence Highway. When this bridge was constructed, a commemorative tablet honoring the brook was installed. The brook then passes through a culvert beneath the Dedham Mall before reemerging near the former transfer station and flowing beneath the Washington Street Bridge.

Further downstream, the brook crosses under Maverick Street, Bussey Street, and Saw Mill Lane—locations historically associated with three early mills. Within the Mother Brook Condominium complex, just downstream from Centennial Dam, it flows beneath a small bridge connecting North Stone Mill Drive and South Stone Mill Drive. Upon entering Hyde Park, it continues under bridges at River Street and Reservation Road before merging with the Neponset River.

Bridge maintenance and improvements have been proposed or undertaken over the years by the Commonwealth of Massachusetts, the Town of Dedham, the City of Boston, and private entities. (Note: See, for example:)

== Recreation ==
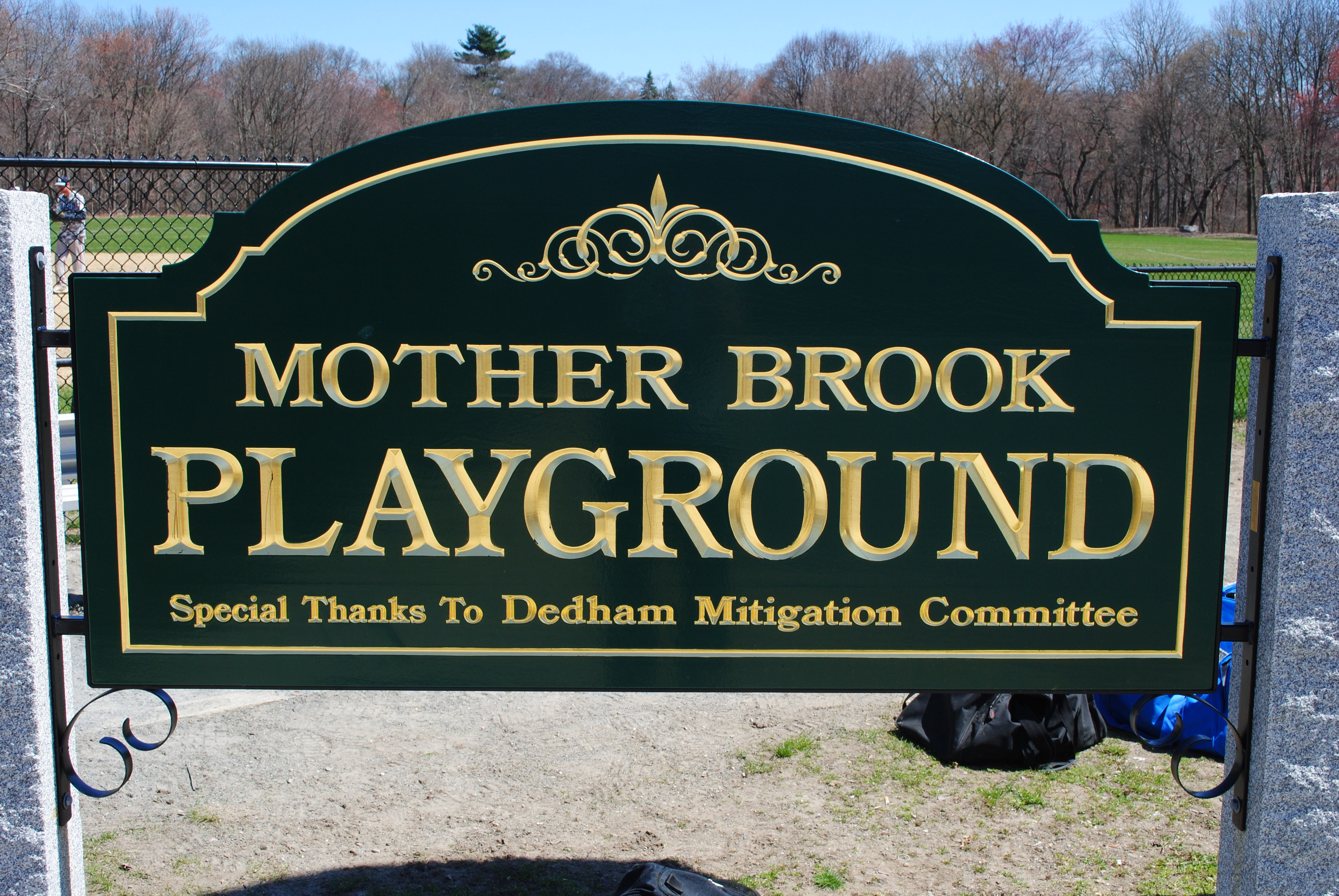

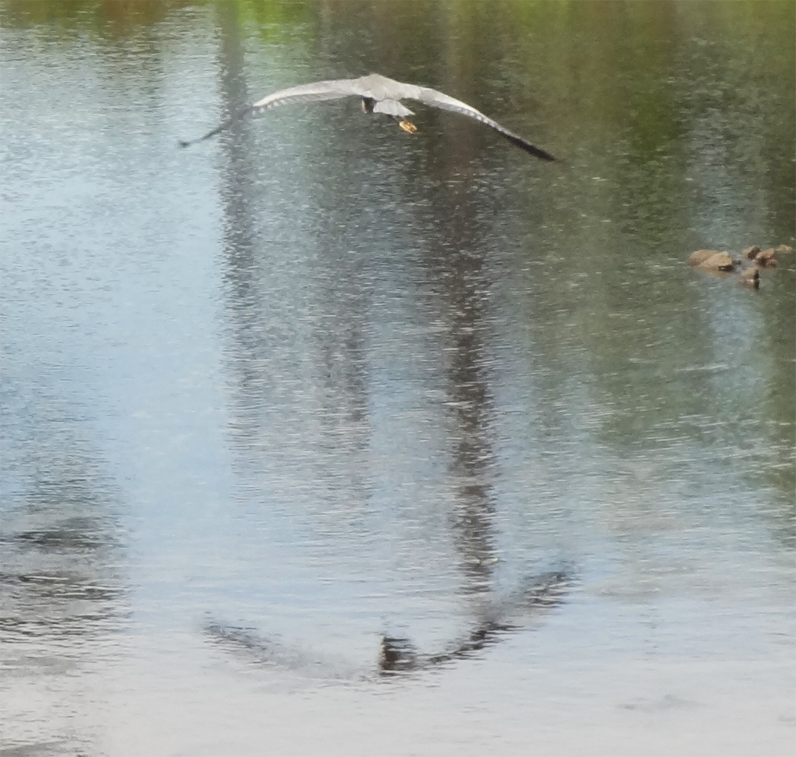
A heron flies over Mother Brook in Hyde Park.

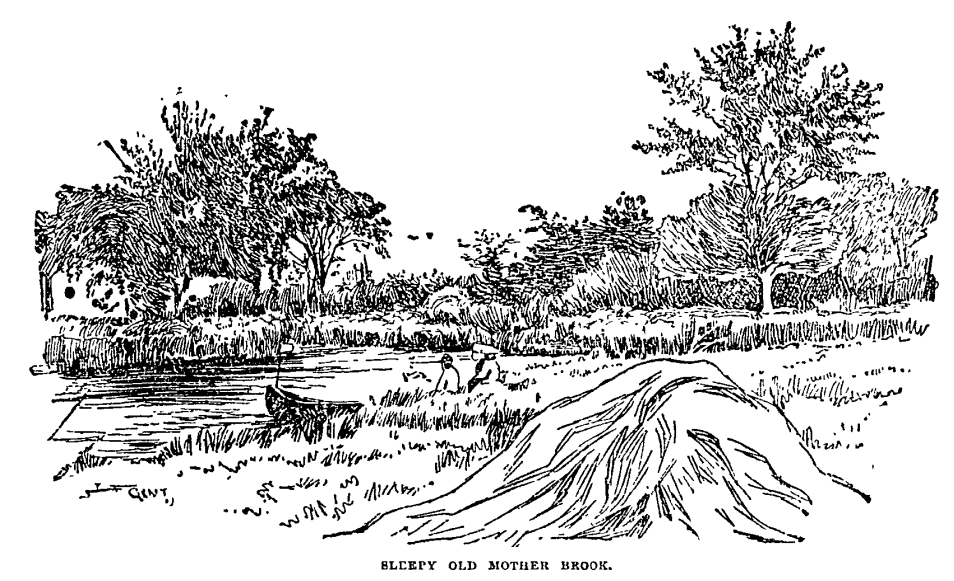
Mother Brook as it appeared in 1893

For many years, Mother Brook served as a popular destination for boating, bathing, and ice skating. According to one contemporary account, during the winters of the 1870s and 1880s, the number of youths gathering to skate on the ice "must have numbered in the hundreds."

=== Swimming ===
A public bathhouse was constructed in 1898 at a cost of $700 on what is now Incinerator Road near the Dedham Mall. (Note: Parr places the bathhouse on the south side of the brook in this area, while Neiswander places it on the north bank.) The facility included hot and cold showers in its locker rooms.

To improve swimming conditions, the brook was occasionally dredged in this area, and the town maintained the adjacent beach. In the 1930s, daily attendance sometimes exceeded 1,000 people, and men returning home from work would occasionally stop for a swim.

During the early 20th century, while Dedham had a commissioner of Mother Brook, recreational responsibilities fell to the Planning Board. The board appointed a special police officer and lifeguard and organized swimming and diving competitions. The American Red Cross also offered lifesaving instruction.

In 1907, Tuesday and Friday afternoons were reserved for women and girls. Girls aged 16 and under were admitted for free, while those older paid a five-cent fee. J. Vincent Reilly, the youngest member of the Parks Commission, taught swimming to crowds of over 200 people.

The town provided a dock for swimmers to jump from, though some bathers preferred to leap from the New York, New Haven, and Hartford Railroad bridge that spanned the brook en route to Dedham station.

The original bathhouse burned down in 1923, and a proposal to rebuild it the following year was expected to receive an unfavorable recommendation from the Warrant Committee. A new bathhouse was constructed in 1925.

By the 1940s, summer games and swim meets were held at the site, with some events drawing as many as 800 spectators. The facility closed after the summer of 1952 due to concerns over pollution in the brook. Attendance had declined, and there were increasing issues with vandalism.

The swimming area at present-day Mill Pond Park was considered a workplace perk by employees of the Boston Envelope Company in 1936.

=== Boating and fishing ===
A canoeist writing in 1893 described entering Mother Brook from the Charles River as follows:

Bid adieu to the flat marshlands and broad views of the farther river, for the little brook carries us through varied scenery—now by a barnyard with its lowing cattle, ducks splashing and dibbing in the water, and a dilapidated old carryall backed into the stream, left to wash itself, and then into the cool woodlands, where we can almost touch the banks on either hand. And the green alder bushes arch over our heads, forming a cool and shady tunnel. The water is so shallow that we see plainly the brilliantly colored pebbles on the bottom and daintily hued little fish darting hither and thither. It is a busy, brawling stream and hurries on to join the Neponset, industriously turning the numerous mills on the way.

In the 1930s and 1940s, the Massachusetts Division of Fisheries and Game stocked the brook with trout. In 1941, anglers lined the banks during parts of the fishing season.

=== Open space and parks ===
In 1905, future Supreme Court justice Louis D. Brandeis wrote to William Beltran De Las Casas, chairman of the Metropolitan Park Commission, urging him to consider adding Mother Brook to the Metropolitan Park System of Greater Boston. Brandeis described the brook as "unique in the metropolitan district" and "quite like the Maine woods." He argued that, although it was separated from the rest of the park system, its inclusion would "greatly subserve" the system's long-term interests. De Las Casas agreed, but opposition from mill owners—who threatened litigation—and the high cost of acquiring the land through eminent domain stalled the effort.

By 1915, well-maintained gardens were reported along both banks of the brook. In 1968, the Metropolitan Park Commission applied for a federal Open Spaces Grant while portions of the brook’s headwaters were being drained for the construction of the Dedham Mall. In 1980, the Boston Natural Areas Fund preserved a parcel along the brook as "green relief from massed buildings and pavement." The City of Boston later constructed a park on Reservation Road in 1999, reinforcing the brook’s banks as part of the project. The six-acre site included a skateboard park, a landscaped nature area, and cleanup of environmental contaminants.

Today, Mother Brook is bordered by walking trails, a picnic area, a canoe launch, Condon Park, and an accessible playground. The Mother Brook Community Group secured a grant from Dedham Savings to convert the former town beach at the intersection of Bussey and Colburn streets into a passive park featuring an observation deck, benches, landscaping, and a stone path. Mill Pond Park opened on July 12, 2014. The community group has also reopened portions of the brook to fishing, and the catch is considered safe to eat in moderate quantities.

== Works cited ==
- Davison (1948). Davison's Textile Blue Book: United States and Canada. Vol. 84. Davison Publishing Company.
- Davison's Textile Blue Book: United States and Canada. Davison Publishing Company. 1910.
- Clarke, Wm. Horatio (1903). Mid-Century Memories of Dedham. Dedham Historical Society.
- Dedham Historical Society (2001). Images of America: Dedham. Arcadia Publishing. ISBN 978-0-7385-0944-0.
- Haven, Samuel Foster (1837). An Historical Address Delivered Before the Citizens of the Town of Dedham, on the Twenty-first of September, 1836, Being the Second Centennial Anniversary of the Incorporation of the Town. H. Mann.
- Hanson, Robert Brand (1976). Dedham, Massachusetts, 1635-1890. Dedham Historical Society.
- Hurd, Duane Hamilton (1884). History of Norfolk County, Massachusetts: With Biographical Sketches of Many of Its Pioneers and Prominent Men. J. W. Lewis & Company.
- Lamson, Alvan (1839). A History of the First Church and Parish in Dedham, in Three Discourses. Herman Mann.
- Neiswander, Judith (2024). Mother Brook and the Mills of East Dedham. Damianos Publishing. ISBN 978-1-941573-66-2.
- Parr, James L. (2009). Dedham: Historic and Heroic Tales From Shiretown. The History Press. ISBN 978-1-59629-750-0.
- Steinberg, Theodore (January 29, 2004). Nature Incorporated: Industrialization and the Waters of New England. Cambridge University Press. ISBN 9780521527118.
- Tritsch, Electa Kane (1986). Building Dedham. Dedham Historical Society.
- Worthington, Erastus (1900). Historical sketch of Mother Brook, Dedham, Mass: compiled from various records and papers, showing the diversion of a portion of the Charles River into the Neponset River and the manufactures on the stream, from 1639 to 1900. Dedham, MA: C.G. Wheeler.
