= Gateley (disambiguation) =

Gateley is a village in Norfolk, England.

Gateley or Gately may also refer to:

- Gateley (surname), with a list of people of this name
- Gately, a surname, with a list of people of this name
- Gately Building, a historic commercial building Pawtucket, Rhode Island, United States
