= Thomas Barrows =

Thomas Barrows may refer to:

- Thomas Barrows III, American sailor
- Thomas Barrows (mill owner), American mill owner
