= Dedham, Massachusetts, in the American Civil War =

The town of Dedham, Massachusetts, participated in the American Civil War primarily through the 630 men who served in the United States Armed Forces during the war. A total of 46 men would die in the war, including in battle, from disease, from wounds sustained in battle, and in prisoner of war camps. The Town of Dedham supported the soldiers and their families both through appropriations raised by taxes, and through donations of supplies sent to the front lines.

== 1861 ==
=== Training ===
Several days after the fall of Fort Sumter, a mass meeting was held in Temperance Hall which opened with a dramatic presentation of the American flag. A total of 47 men signed up to serve in the war at that meeting, forming Dedham's first military unit since the Dedham militia was disbanded in 1846. (Note: Worthington believed the last disbanded in 1842.) More men would enlist in the coming days and the first company was formed in early May.

Initially, the recruits only drilled sporadically. After it became clear that the war would not be won quickly, the troops began drilling full time. During this time they were paid $1.50 a day and were billeted at the Norfolk Agricultural Society's old cattle-show building, which was located near the Town Common. Each soldier was a uniform of gray cloth with blue pipings and an old smooth bore rifle, which was borrowed from the neighboring community of Canton. There were five from South Dedham in Canton's Company in the Fourth Regiment and one from the village in the third regiment.

The troops would march and maneuver through the streets of the village. When they did so, townspeople would come out to watch and young boys would often tag along. During one training session on the Common, a young recruit opened an umbrella when it began to sprinkle. The man, a barber who worked on Church Street, was told by Captain Onion that he could not march with an umbrella. He chose to leave instead, listening to the jeers of the men who remained. An effigy of the "man with the umbrella" appeared hanging from a noose several days later at the corner of Church and High Streets, and the young man quickly left town.

=== Camps Brigham, Massasoit, and Meigs ===
In the 19th century, Readville was a part of Dedham. Ebenezer Paul (Note: Paul's son, Ebenezer Talbot Paul, subdivided the land into what is today the Ashcroft neighborhood.) was exploring his vast acreage in the part of town one day when he discovered several men sitting under one of his long line of elms. They later came back and took the land to train Union soldiers, for which Paul received $300 a year in rent. The government also took 80 acres west of Sprague Pond owned by Isaac Tower. After the war, Tower submitted a claim to the government to pay both rent and for damages to his house and fences. The government paid the rent, but denied his claim for damages.

These tracts of land became Camp Brigham and Camp Massasoit, which were later combined to form Camp Meigs. Under the new name, it became famous for training the 54th Massachusetts Infantry Regiment.

=== 18th Massachusetts ===
The Dedham Company was designated as Company F of the 18th Massachusetts Infantry Regiment by the Adjunct General of Massachusetts in June 1861. (Note: Worthington has it being in July.) All 56 men, plus their commissioned officers, were from Dedham. They were ordered into bivouac at Camp Brigham and were given new, blue uniforms. Their rifles, which were left over from the War of 1812, were exchanged for newer versions. Two months later, on August 23, they were shipped out to the front lines near Washington, D.C.

Nine men enlisted in Company H. They were led by Captain Henry Onion, a West Point graduate. On July 6, the company left Dedham to train in Readville and were preceded by a brass band, members of the Town's fire company, and dozens of residents.

The regiment arrived in Washington on September 3, 1861, and were ordered to report to Gen. Fitz John Porter and assigned to Martindale's brigade. The regiment was engaged in drill and in working upon the fortifications of Washington until the 26th when it advanced with the army and took its position at Hall's Hill, Virginia. At a grand review of the army, the 18th received one of three prizes for drill and general proficiency in discipline, winning a complete set of uniforms, camp equipage, and tents imported from France by the general government. Three Dedham men, Sergeant Damrell and Privates Guild and Stevens, died that winter; their remains were brought home for burial.

== 1862 ==
=== Battle of Gaines' Mill ===
On March 10, 1862, the 18th moved to Hampton Roads with the Army of the Potomac and entered upon the Peninsular campaign. They were before Yorktown during its siege for 24 days and most of the time under fire. Then, passing up the York River by transports and disembarking at West Point, they participated in the movements of the division until June 26. They missed the battle at Hanover Court House on May 27 by being ordered to rest after picket duty during a driving rain storm in the preceding night. On the day previous to the battle at Gaines Mills, June 27, the 18th was ordered to join an expedition under Gen Stoneman fitted out to repel an anticipated attack upon the right flank of the army by the enemy under Stonewall Jackson. They marched towards White House on the Pamunkey and, passing down the York and up the James by transports, they rejoined the army at Harrison's Landing after the battles of the Chickahominy and Malvern Hill. During all those battles the 18th was detached from its brigade.

Private Joseph Jordan of Company H was 18 years old when he learned his regiment was not to fight at the Battle of Gaines' Mill. Wanting to fight, he mingled with the ranks of the Ninth Massachusetts, joined in their charge, and never came out alive. Also in this battle, Thomas Sherwin of the 22nd Massachusetts Infantry was wounded and was promoted Major for gallant conduct.

=== Second Battle of Bull Run ===
On August 20, the regiment left Hampton Roads and, disembarking at Acquia Creek, proceeded to Falmouth. The army had now come within the department of General Pope and were subject to his orders. A series of movements for eight days with Porter's corps brought Dedham's soldiers to the vicinity of Bull Run. On August 30, at the Second Battle of Bull Run, Porter's corps was ordered to make a vigorous assault upon the Confederate position. The 18th was the first regiment to advance to the attack and the last to leave the field. The 18th regiment was highly and especially commended for its steadiness and gallantry. Seven Dedham men died in that battle, or shortly thereafter. Five were severely wounded, and only 14 of the 40 Dedham soldiers were not wounded at all.

Charles Whiting Carroll acted as Lt. Colonel of the regiment during the Second Battle of Bull Run. (Note: Carroll attended the Dedham Public Schools as a child. His father, Sanford, lived on Court Street and kept one of the village stables.) While retiring from the field and bringing up the rear of the regiment, he was struck by a ball near the shoulder blade which probably penetrated the spinal column as he was rendered helpless and, in the confusion of retreat, was left behind. His friend, Adjt Baker, two days after succeeded in passing the rebel lines under a flag of truce and found him where he had fallen. Carroll was in a state of suffering although he had not been wholly uncared for by the enemy. The next day, a carriage was sent to bring him within the Union lines but he died two hours before it reached its destination. He was decently buried on the field but the remains were subsequently brought home and buried with solemn rites.

=== 35th Massachusetts ===
The results of the Peninsular campaign revealed the necessity of replenishing the army. In early in July 1862, President Lincoln had called for 300,000 men for three years and assigned the quota of Massachusetts at 15,000 men. The quota of Dedham was 69 and the Selectmen, through whom thenceforward all recruiting during the war was carried on, issued their call for that number. On July 21, the town voted to pay a bounty of $100 to each volunteer with aid to families. It also appropriated $6,900 for the bounties.

One of the largest and most impressive of the public meetings during the war was held July 10, before the legal town meeting. Men were there inspired by an earnest purpose to devote themselves to the country. After the preliminary discussion as to bounties, the roll was opened and then came a pause when it seemed doubtful if any would come forward. The first man to sign that roll was the father of Joseph Jordan, the private who had been killed at Gaines Mills. Another was a young man who had been recently graduated at the university and was beginning his professional studies. A third announced his purpose in impressive and earnest words. He would later receive a severe wound in battle and then nearly a year's confinement in four rebel prisons. The quota was soon filled.

Uniting with men from Needham and Weston, the new recruits constituted Company I of the 35th Massachusetts Infantry Regiment. Without any opportunities for drill or organization, the regiment left the state on August 22, 1862 for the seat of war. On their arrival at Washington, they were immediately assigned to the defenses of the city in throwing up earthworks and doing picket duty.

While the 18th still remained with Porter's Corps, the 35th was in the 2nd Brigade, 2nd Division, 9th Corps under General Burnside. The army was then in motion towards Maryland to meet General Robert E. Lee. The necessities of those days were inexorable and called for long and rapid marches. Burnside's Corps started first and on September 14, only three weeks after they had left their homes, the Dedham soldiers met the enemy at South Mountain. The 35th on that day dislodged rebel sharpshooters from an extensive tract of forest and received a sharp attack from the enemy. Here, Private George F. Whiting was fatally wounded and died on October 7. Sergeant Henry W. Tisdale and Private Clinton Bagley were wounded, the former severely.

=== Antietam and Shepherdstown ===
Porter's Corps, which left Washington on the 12th, then joined the main army and, on the 17th, supported batteries in the Battle of Antietam. The 35th was engaged in the movements of Burnside's Corps which had a highly important part in the battle. They charged the enemy, drove him over the bridge, and held the crest of the second hill beyond until ordered to retire. Thus, within a month from their departure from Dedham, the company had been twice on hard fought fields and in the thickest of the battles.

At Antietam, Corporal Edward E. Hatton and Privates Charles H. Sulkoski and Joseph P. White of South Dedham were killed. Corporal Edmund Davis was very severely wounded and six others wounded more or less severely, of whom Private Nathan C. Treadwell died about a month after. Besides these there were two killed and several wounded of the company who belonged elsewhere.

At the Battle of Shepherdstown on September 20, 1862, Company F of the 18th were engaged with their regiment where 3 were killed and 11 were wounded.

== 1863 ==
=== 43rd Massachusetts ===
Soon after the call under which Dedham had furnished sixty-nine men for the 35th regiment, there came yet another call from the president with an order for a draft to which Dedham was required to respond with 122 men for nine months service. In anticipation of the draft, the town offered a bounty of $200 with aid to families to volunteers. The short term of service was a great inducement for some who were unable to enlist for three years and soon the requisite number was made up almost exclusively from Dedham. These chiefly constituted Company D of the 43rd Regiment Massachusetts Infantry which, on October 24, 1862, was ordered to North Carolina where it remained during nearly the whole term of its service.

The regiment was under fire at Kinston and Whitehall in December. Dedham's company, with two others, were detached for picket duty for a time and afterwards marched with the regiment on Trenton. It was ordered to the relief of Little Washington and encountered the enemy at Blount's Creek. It was then occupied in picket duty and those other nameless duties which constitute so large a part of a soldier's life in camp. On June 27 it was ordered to report to General Dix and proceeded to White House on the Pamunkey in Virginia, and then to Fortress Monroe and then to Baltimore.

On July 7, the term of service having expired, it was left to the option of the men to go to the front, this being immediately after the battle of Gettysburg, or to return home. There were 200 of the regiment who remained, including 13 from Dedham. They returned home on July 21 and all were mustered out July 30, 1863. One member of Dedham's company was accidentally killed in Readville.

=== Fredericksburg and Chancellorsville ===
At Fredericksburg, both of Dedham's companies bore a very prominent part. The 18th was the leading regiment of its corps. Two Dedham soldiers from this regiment, Privates Jonathan H. Keyes and Daniel Leahy, were killed and several were wounded. The position of the 35th was scarcely less exposed, being in the advance of its corps and they received a deadly fire at short range. They held their ground until, their ammunition being exhausted, their brigade was relieved. It was the last regiment but one to leave Fredericksburg. Private George C. Bunker and Lt. William Hill were killed on the heights and buried in the field. Four other Dedham soldiers of the 35th were wounded more or less severely in the battle.

Private Michael Henihan of the Second Massachusetts Infantry was killed at the Battle of Chancellorsville.

=== Capture of Jackson, Mississippi ===
The 35th then detached from the Army of the Potomac and was sent to another and distant department. In March 1863, it had proceeded with the reorganized Ninth Corps to the southwest where its services were much needed. April and May were passed in Kentucky. Thence they were transported down the Mississippi to the vicinity of Vicksburg where they threw up earthworks and defenses. They were now with the Army of the Tennessee under the command of General Grant. Under Sherman, after the surrender of Vicksburg, they marched into the interior of Mississippi in pursuit of the force of General Johnston. After days of toilsome and painful marches with frequent skirmishing and a brief siege, they captured Jackson, the capital of the state. Here the 35th had the honor of being the first regiment to plant its colors within the city, pulling down the rebel ensign from the State House and of throwing to the breeze from that abode of treason the stars and stripes. In this campaign, Private David Phalen died in camp of disease. In August, the regiment almost exactly retraced its steps and on October 1 was in Kentucky.

=== Gettysburg ===
The 18th fought at the Battle of Gettysburg and, while one died and 13 were wounded, none were from Dedham. On July 3, however, Sergeant Edward Hutchins of the First Co Andrew's Sharpshooters was shot and died two hours later. Virgil Upham, who was then serving in the 102nd New York Infantry Regiment, was also killed in the battle.

President Andrew Johnson nominated Thomas Sherwin for the award of the honorary grade of brevet brigadier general, United States Volunteers, for distinguished gallantry at the Battle of Gettysburg and for gallant and meritorious services during the war. The U.S. Senate confirmed the award on May 18, 1866.

=== Fall 1863 ===
In October 1863, the 35th marched across the mountains through Cumberland Gap to Knoxville, Tennessee. It was engaged at Loudon Bridge and Campbell's Station and then fell back to Knoxville, then besieged by the enemy under General Longstreet. It was during this campaign that Private Charles Henry Ellis, the regimental clerk, was taken prisoner and was confined in Belle Isle Prison. It is supposed he died in Richmond the succeeding year. During this winter, the regiment suffered much for want of food and clothing. In March, their Western campaign ended and they were transported again to Annapolis, Maryland where the Ninth Corps was again reorganized.

The 18th was in the battle at the Second Battle of Rappahannock Station on November 7, 1863 and at Mine Creek on the 29 and 30 of the same month. These concluded their campaigns in 1863.

== 1864 ==
On May 3, 1864, 18th regiment, then part of Fifth Corps, began marching at midnight. On May 5, while reconnoitering for the enemy, the 18th was the first regiment to encounter Ewell's Corps which were then moving in pursuit. The first infantry man killed in the campaign belonged to the 18th and it received the brunt of the first assault of the enemy in the battles of the Wilderness. During the three days of battle, where neither cavalry nor artillery could be used, where not only were the lines of battle entirely hidden from the sight of the commander but no officer could see ten files from him, the 18th was engaged in skirmishing and in assaults upon entrenchments. No fatal casualties occurred among Dedham men, but Col. Hayes was severely wounded and several were killed and wounded in the regiment.

The 35th crossed the Rapidan two days later as part of the Ninth Corps and, passing over the battlegrounds at Fredericksburg and Chancellorsville, arrived in the Wilderness during the second day's battle. In the movement toward Spottsylvania, the Fifth Corps were charged with the duty of seizing Spottsylvania Court House. Both the Fifth and Ninth Corps were in line of battle on the north of Spottsylvania. Here occurred one of the most fierce and deadly struggles of the war. In the engagement of May 18, 1864, the 35th participated. The result of the battles leaving the Union lines intact, another turning movement was determined upon.

On May 20, the hostile armies again confronted each other at the North Anna River. The 18th crossed at Jericho Ford and was then detached from its brigade to occupy an eminence where it was exposed to a heavy fire from Hill's Corps. During this assault, Lieut Col White was wounded. The 35th crossed on the 24th when it began a skirmish followed by the whole brigade. The enemy was driven into their works by a sudden storm and a fresh force of the enemy compelled them to retire.

On May 23, at the Battle of North Anna, Sergeant John Finn Jr. of the 22nd Massachusetts Infantry received a wound on his arm which rendered amputation necessary; he died from its effects on June 5. In the assault at Cold Harbor, the Fifth Corps did not actively participate. The Ninth Corps was partially engaged and the 35th was employed in throwing up earth works. Dedham's Private Albert C. Bean of the 20th Massachusetts Infantry's Company I was wounded on June 3 while holding the left of the assaulting column. He died five days after.

On June 7, the 18th reached the Chickahominy and, after some days skirmishing, crossed on June 13. They passed the James on June 16 and marched directly to the fortifications in front of Petersburg. Here they were engaged in throwing up earth works in the presence of the enemy. On July 5, Private Cyrus D. Tewksbury, who had served from the beginning, was killed.

By Fall 1864, all able bodied men had left town and had been sent to the field.

=== The 18th musters out ===
By July 20, 1864, the 18th had nearly reached the end of its term of service of three years and was ordered to Washington in anticipation of discharge. Twelve Dedham men had re-enlisted and these, together with those whose term was not ended, remained with the 18th Battalion. When the officers were mustered out, this battalion was merged in the 32nd Regiment.

On September 3, 1864 the 18th was mustered out of service. It had participated in some 15 battles. Of the 58 who enlisted from Dedham, 11 had fallen in the field, six had died from disease and wounds received in battle, eight had been discharged by reason of wounds, and 13 by reason of disability resulting from wounds. Of the whole company, 23 men had either died or fallen in battle. The regiment bore a part in nearly all the general battles of the Army of the Potomac except those of the Peninsula before Richmond. Upon their return, Dedham welcomed them with fitting ceremonies.

Among those who re-enlisted after their three year term was up was Private Henry C. Everett. (Note: Everett grew up on the corner of School Street and Washington Street and was the brother of Robert.) He died in Washington January 19, 1865.

=== Battles of the Crater and of Poplar Spring Church ===
The Dedham men of the 35th bore a part in the Siege of Petersburg and the closing campaign. At first they were employed in throwing up earth works and batteries, laying down abattis, and in the construction of works necessary for a besieging army. At the memorable explosion of the mine on July 30, 1864 it was their duty to advance after the explosion and turn the works of the enemy. Private Michael Colbert was killed in the advance of the regiment over the works. The crater was left in the command of Lt. Farrington, who later moved to Dedham.

At Poplar Spring Church on September 30, John W. Fiske, formerly a Sergeant in Company I but recently promoted to be first lieutenant in the 58th Massachusetts Infantry, was killed and buried on the field.

=== The 35th musters out ===
Nothing decisive occurred to the 18th during the winter of 1864-5. In March 1865, it was removed to a part of Fort Sedgwick, about four hundred yards from the enemy's works. This was a post of great danger, being subject to an almost continuous fire, and where they passed one month. On April 2, they assaulted Fort Mahone, the rebel work opposite and held a portion of it. During the same night, Petersburg was evacuated by the enemy and on the next morning the men had the satisfaction of marching through the streets of Petersburg with colors flying, band playing, and of receiving with shouts of victory and welcome the president of the United States as he rode along their lines. After Lee's surrender, the regiment passed in review at Washington on May 23, reached Massachusetts on June 13, and were mustered out of service on June 27.

The 35th saw nearly three years of active service, beginning almost with the day of their arrival in the field. On its colors were inscribed, by an order of General Meade, the names of 13 battles to which was afterwards added a 14th. Their campaigns were not limited by a state or a department. They fought in Kentucky, East Tennessee, and Mississippi, as well as in Maryland and Virginia. In many of their battles, their position was among the most exposed to the enemy and sometimes in the most deadly conflicts. It became a proverb among the soldiers that the commanding officer of the 35th was sure to be struck down in every engagement.

Of the 68 who enlisted from Dedham, six were killed in battle and one more died soon after of his wounds, five died in the service from disease, eight were discharged on account of their wounds, and eleven for disability. The Town desired to give them a public welcome home, but they declined the honor, saying they preferred to pass without ceremony from the life of the soldier to that of the citizen.

== 54th Massachusetts ==
The 54th Massachusetts Infantry Regiment, the first all black regiment authorized to fight in the war, trained at Camp Meigs. The black soldiers were commanded by white officers, including Captain William Simkins of Dedham. John H. Bancroft served as a private in Company A. Both Bancroft and Simkins died at the Second Battle of Fort Wagner.

On May 18, 1863, Governor John Albion Andrew presented the regiment with their colors in front of Frederick Douglass, William Lloyd Garrison, Wendell Phillips, and more than a thousand others on the parade grounds at Camp Meigs. That night, a grand ball was held in their honor at the Norfolk Hotel.

== Dead from other regiments ==
While most soldiers served in either the 18th or 35th regiments, some served elsewhere. The 24th, 28th, 39th, and 56th regiments each had at least one Dedhamite who died while in the service. From two regiments of Massachusetts cavalry there were three Dedham men who died. Three died as prisoners of war. At Fort Wagner, one Dedham man died fighting alongside soldiers from the 54th Massachusetts Volunteer Infantry and elsewhere. Dedham men were buried in Virginia, the Carolinas, Louisiana, and Georgia.

== Support from home ==
The women of the town immediately began working on producing supplies for the troops at the outbreak of war. In a span of 24 hours, they sewed 100 flannel shirts, of which 60 were sent to the state and 40 were reserved for Dedham soldiers. The following day, April 23, 1861, they sent the balance to Governor John Albion Andrew with the following note:

Dear Sir,- The Ladies of Dedham have the satisfaction of sending you sixty flannel shirts for the troops who are about going South in the defence of our country and the support of her government. We send these garments with our blessing and our prayers with a tender sympathy and an earnest God speed to the true hearted patriots who are ready to sacrifice so much in a noble cause.

May the dark clouds now gathering around us ere long be dispersed and our beloved country become again the abode of prosperity and peace.

More than three hundred dollars worth of material has already been made into garments by the ladies most of which will be applied to the use of the volunteers from this town and this noble work of good women has by no means ceased.

In the next two weeks, they made an additional 140 shirts, 140 pairs of flannel underwear, 126 towels, 132 handkerchiefs, 24 hospital shirts, 70 pincushions, 70 bags, and a handful of needlebooks. During the war, several Dedhamites traveled to visit the soldiers in camp, and several in service received furloughs to visit home.

A New Years Dinner, consisting of 30 turkeys, 100 pounds of plum pudding, 100 mince pies, and a variety of other victuals were shipped to the Dedham Company by train. After the Second Battle of Bull Run, a messenger burst into a church on Sunday morning with news of the defeat. The service was halted, and churchgoers organized into work parties. Less than six hours later, two wagon loads of clothing, bandages, medicines, and other supplies were on their way to Boston to be loaded onto an emergency supply train.

Eliphalet Stone in particular was a great supporter of the men of Dedham who served. During the war, it was said that no person was more interested in the welfare of the soldiers than Stone. He sacrificed his business interests to visit the soldiers in the field and made arrangements to provide for their families. After the war, he donated a choice plot of land upon a hill and a monument to their sacrifice in Brookdale Cemetery to the local Grand Army of the Republic chapter.

=== Town appropriations ===
On May 6, 1861, the Town voted to "stand by the volunteers and to protect their families during the war." The Town Meeting also appropriated $10,000 for the cause. A number of other similar votes would take place in the coming years such that the Town would spend a total of $136,090.81 on outfitting the troops, supporting the families, and providing bonuses for soldiers who enlisted.

=== Dedham Ladies Soldiers Aid Society ===
The Dedham Ladies Soldiers Aid Society was organized October 12, 1861, with officers and held weekly meetings until the end of the war. The funds received during the four years amounted to $3,040.96 and the expenditures to $2,921.42. These moneys were raised by annual assessments, donations from individuals, the sale of some articles left from the Dedham table at the Sanitary Fair in Boston, collections taken in the various religious societies, concerts, amateur theatrical entertainments, tableaux lectures, etc. Of the materials purchased, the ladies made up a large part themselves and the rest was made at their individual expense. Many contributions of partly worn clothing were received repaired and forwarded.

Besides contributing bandages, the Society re-rolled many hundreds of them sent from the Sanitary Commission rooms in Boston. Several times it received the thanks of the executive committee for the important aid thus rendered. During the first year, the supplies were sent in various directions to the Sanitary Commission, the Union Aid Society at St. Louis, the NEWAA in Boston, to ladies in Philadelphia, to Cavalry Regiment at Readville, to the hospital at Alexandria, Virginia, to Forts Warren and Independence, and on Sunday August 31, 1862, the inhabitants of Dedham united in sending fifteen boxes to Washington.

The second year, the supplies with few exceptions were sent sometimes to the hospitals in Philadelphia and sometimes to the NEWAA. Beginning in October 1862, all contributions been sent to the NEWAA, except a present of mittens, needle cases, etc, which were sent to the 9th Regiment US Colored Troops. The total number of articles forwarded as nearly as could be ascertained was 7,967, not including bandages, rolls of cotton linen, and flannel. These items accompanied nearly every contribution. It also does not include wines, jellies, and other delicacies as nearly every box contained more or less.

A similar society existed in South Dedham.

== Post war ==
Eventually, 630 Dedham men would serve in the war. The Dedham Transcript wrote that "Almost to a man", the Catholic men of Dedham "answered Lincoln's call", and sadly "no church in Dedham lost so many men in proportion to their numbers as did St. Mary's." Their patriotism and deaths did much to counter the anti-Catholic bias that existed in town. The war put a great strain on pastor Patrick O'Beirne's health.

Of the 46 Dedham men who died in the war, 15 are buried in the Old Village Cemetery, two in the second parish, and three in the third parish. On May 30, 1868, their graves were decorated with flowers. Of the hundreds of soldiers who were transported to Camp Meigs, 64 of them died there and were buried at the Old Village Cemetery. There is a monument in the cemetery to them made of granite and topped with a pyramid of cannon balls.

In 1865, the first notice of Abraham Lincoln's death was posted on a buttonwood tree in front of the home of Jeremiah Shuttleworth, today the location of the Dedham Historical Society.

In 1867, it was decided that a new building should be erected to both house the town offices and to memorialize those who died in the Civil War. The firm of Ware and Van Brunt (Note: Van Brunt was the son of Dedham's commodore Gershom Jacques Van Brunt) was hired to design Memorial Hall, and they produced a "supremely Victorian plan" that recalled the "provincial town halls of England in outline and design."

After the war, Eliphalet Stone donated a choice plot of land upon a hill and a monument to the sacrifice of Union soldiers to the local Grand Army of the Republic chapter at Brookdale Cemetery. On the hill, which was 200' in circumference, was a monument including four cannons used in the war that were presumably confiscated from Confederate troops. The monument itself is a granite pedestal with the words "Repose", "Mespha", and "Gilead".

== Others who served ==
Frank Wilson, who lived on Washington Street near School Street, also served. His neighbors, Robert F. and Henry Everett also served. Robert entered the service under General Benjamin Butler in New Orleans. (Note: Robert attended Dartmouth College.) While working in the Commissary Department as a clerk, Robert wore civilian clothing. After his death, a military shirt was sent home to his parents with his other effects.

William B. Gould served in the Union Navy before settling in Dedham.

== See also ==
- Massachusetts in the American Civil War

== Works cited ==
- Clarke, Wm. Horatio (1903). Mid-Century Memories of Dedham. Dedham Historical Society.
- Hanson, Robert Brand (1976). Dedham, Massachusetts, 1635-1890. Dedham Historical Society.
- Parr, James L. (2009). Dedham: Historic and Heroic Tales From Shiretown. The History Press. ISBN 978-1-59629-750-0.
- Worthington, Erastus (1869). Dedication of the Memorial Hall, in Dedham, September 29, 1868: With an Appendix. John Cox, Jr.
- Dedham Historical Society (2001). Dedham. Arcadia Publishing. ISBN 978-0-7385-0944-0.
- Hurd, Duane Hamilton (1884). History of Norfolk County, Massachusetts: With Biographical Sketches of Many of Its Pioneers and Prominent Men. J. W. Lewis & Company.
- Smith, Frank (1936). A History of Dedham, Massachusetts. Transcript Press, Incorporated.
- Eicher, John H.; Eicher, David J. (2001). Civil War High Commands. Stanford, CA: Stanford University Press. ISBN 0-8047-3641-3.
- Hunt, Roger D.; Brown, Jack R. (1990). Brevet Brigadier Generals in Blue. Gaithersburg, MD: Olde Soldier Books, Inc. ISBN 1-56013-002-4.
- Lathrop, Joseph Henry (October 1892). "Dedham in the Rebellion". Dedham Historical Register. III (4). Dedham Historical Society.
