= Henry Alden =

Henry Alden may refer to:

- Henry Bailey Alden (1862–1939), American architect
- Henry Mills Alden (1836–1919), American author and editor
