= Thomas Sherwin (educator) =

American educator

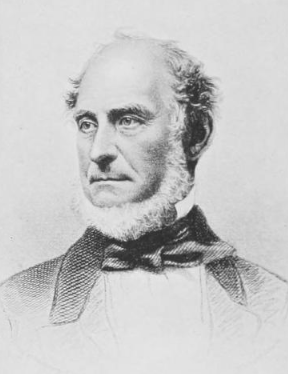
- Born: March 26, 1799; Westmoreland, New Hampshire, US
- Died: July 23, 1869 (aged 70); Dedham, Massachusetts, US
- Resting place: Old Village Cemetery
- Education: Harvard University
- Occupation: Educator
- Spouse: Mary King Gibbens (m. 1836)
- Children: 3, including Thomas Sherwin

Thomas Sherwin (March 26, 1799 – July 23, 1869) was an American educator. He was master of the English High School of Boston from 1838 until 1869.

== Biography ==
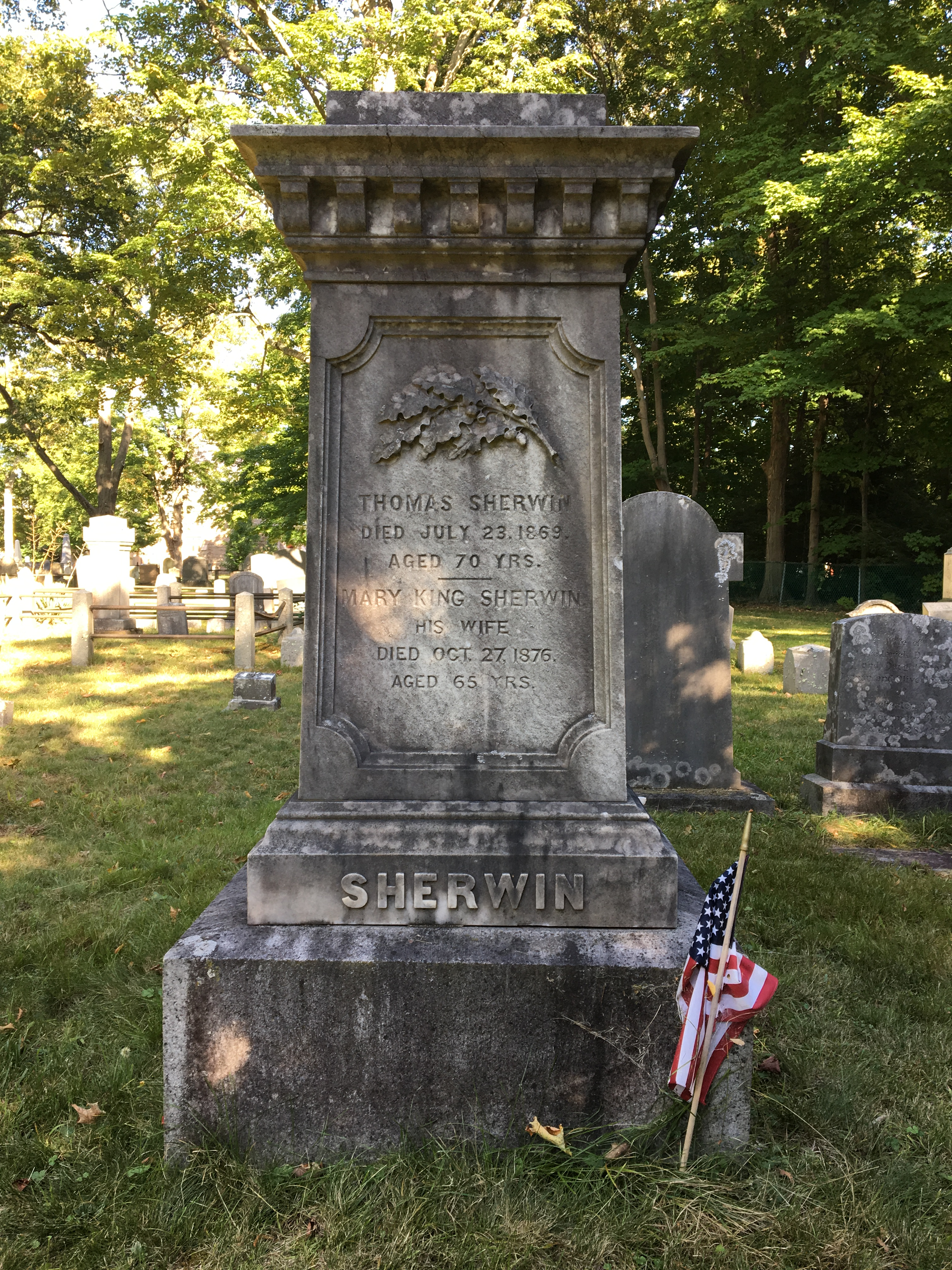
Thomas Sherwin's grave in the Old Village Cemetery

Thomas Sherwin was born in Westmoreland, New Hampshire on March 26, 1799. He worked on a farm in Temple, New Hampshire, served an apprenticeship to a clothier in Groton, Massachusetts, and, after graduation at Harvard in 1825, taught an academy in Lexington, Massachusetts, in 1825/26. He was a tutor in mathematics at Harvard in 1826/27.

In 1828, Sherwin became submaster of the English High School of Boston, of which he had charge from 1838 until his death. This school was reputed a model of its kind.

He was an originator of the American Institute of Instruction in 1830, its president in 1853/4, a member of the American Academy of Arts and Sciences, was active in establishing the Massachusetts Institute of Technology, and was president of the Massachusetts Teachers' Association in 1845. He was the author of an Elementary Treatise on Algebra (Boston, 1841).

He married Mary King Gibbens on June 10, 1836, and they had three children.

His son, also named Thomas Sherwin, was lieutenant colonel of the 22nd Massachusetts Regiment during the American Civil War.

The elder Thomas Sherwin died from heart disease at his home in Dedham, Massachusetts on July 23, 1869.
