= Gately =

Gately is a surname. Notable people with the surname include:

== Real people ==
- George Gately (1928–2001), American cartoonist
- Ian Gately (born 1966), Australian rugby league footballer
- James Gately (1810-1875), also known as the Hermit of Hyde Park, a 19th-century English-born American hermit
- Kevin Gately (1954–1974), English student killed during a protest
- Leo Gately (born 1937), Australian politician
- Stephen Gately (1976–2009), Irish pop singer

== Fictional characters ==
- Don Gately, in the 1996 novel Infinite Jest

== See also ==
- Gateley (surname)
