= Thomas Sherwin =

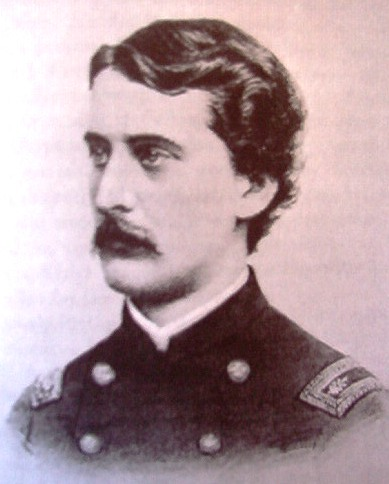
- Born: July 11, 1839; Boston, Massachusetts
- Died: December 19, 1914 (aged 75); Boston, Massachusetts
- Military career
- Allegiance: Union
- Branch: Union Army
- Service years: 1861–1865
- Rank: Lieutenant Colonel; Bvt. Brigadier General
- Unit: 22nd Massachusetts Infantry
- Commands: 1st Brigade, 1st Division, V Corps
- Conflicts: American Civil War
- Other work: President, New England Telephone and Telegraph Company

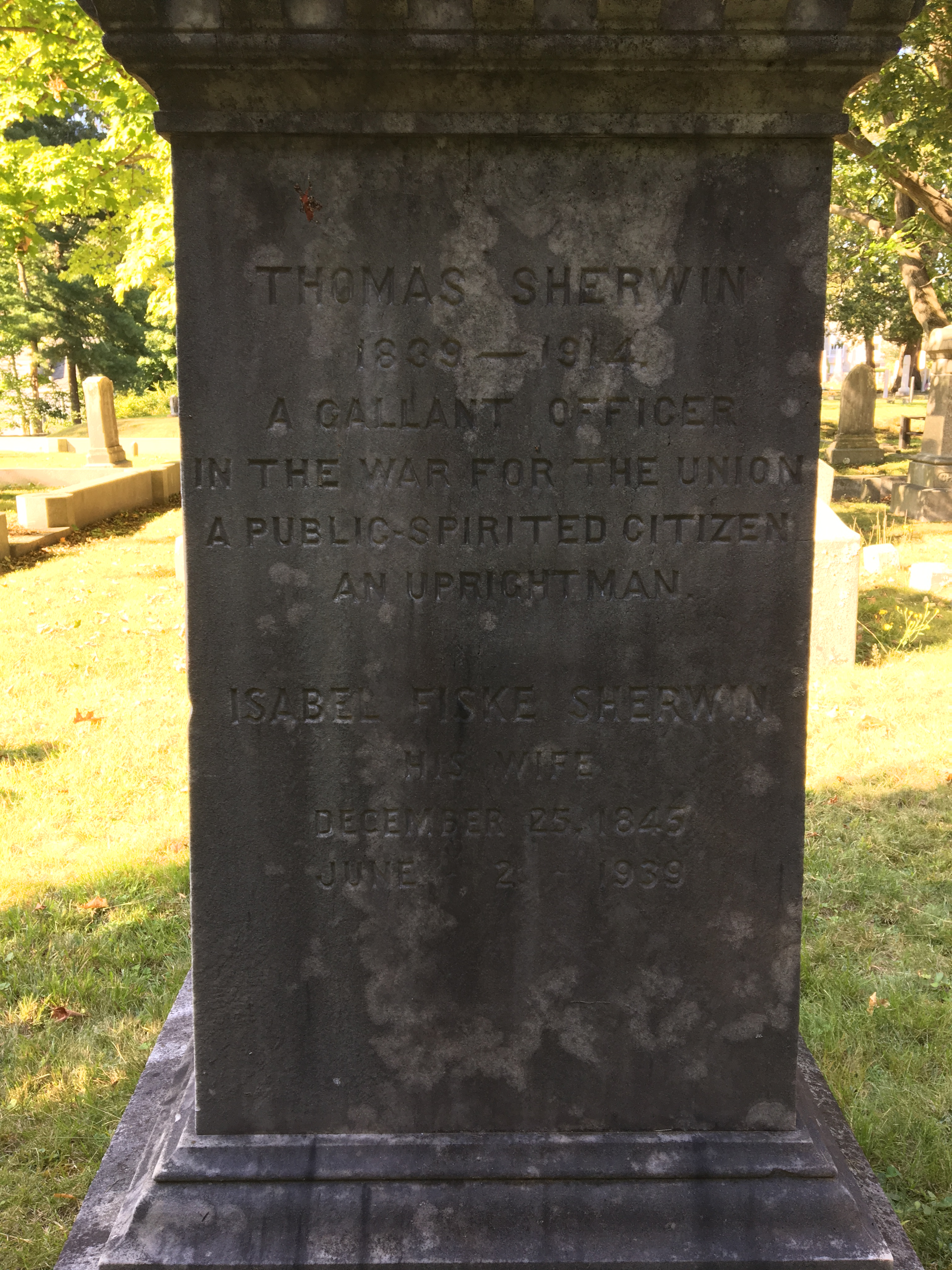
Detail of Thomas Sherwin's grave in the Old Village Cemetery

Thomas Sherwin (July 11, 1839 – December 19, 1914) was an American Civil War general and executive. He was the son of educator Thomas Sherwin, master of the English High School of Boston. The younger Sherwin taught in Dedham, Massachusetts before the war. He enlisted in the 22nd Massachusetts Volunteer Infantry in 1861 as a lieutenant.

He was wounded at the Battle of Gaines' Mill on June 27, 1862. On April 3, 1866, President Andrew Johnson nominated Sherwin for the award of the honorary grade of brevet brigadier general, United States Volunteers, to rank from March 13, 1865, for distinguished gallantry at the Battle of Gettysburg and for gallant and meritorious services during the war, The U.S. Senate confirmed the award on May 18, 1866.

== See also ==
- List of Massachusetts generals in the American Civil War
- Massachusetts in the American Civil War
- Dedham, Massachusetts in the American Civil War

== Works cited ==
- Eicher, John H.; Eicher, David J. (2001). Civil War High Commands. Stanford, CA: Stanford University Press. ISBN 0-8047-3641-3.
- Hunt, Roger D.; Brown, Jack R. (1990). Brevet Brigadier Generals in Blue. Gaithersburg, MD: Olde Soldier Books, Inc. ISBN 1-56013-002-4.
- Worthington, Erastus (1869). Dedication of the Memorial Hall, in Dedham, September 29, 1868: With an Appendix. John Cox, Jr.
