= United Shoe Machinery Corporation Clubhouse =

- U.S. National Register of Historic Places
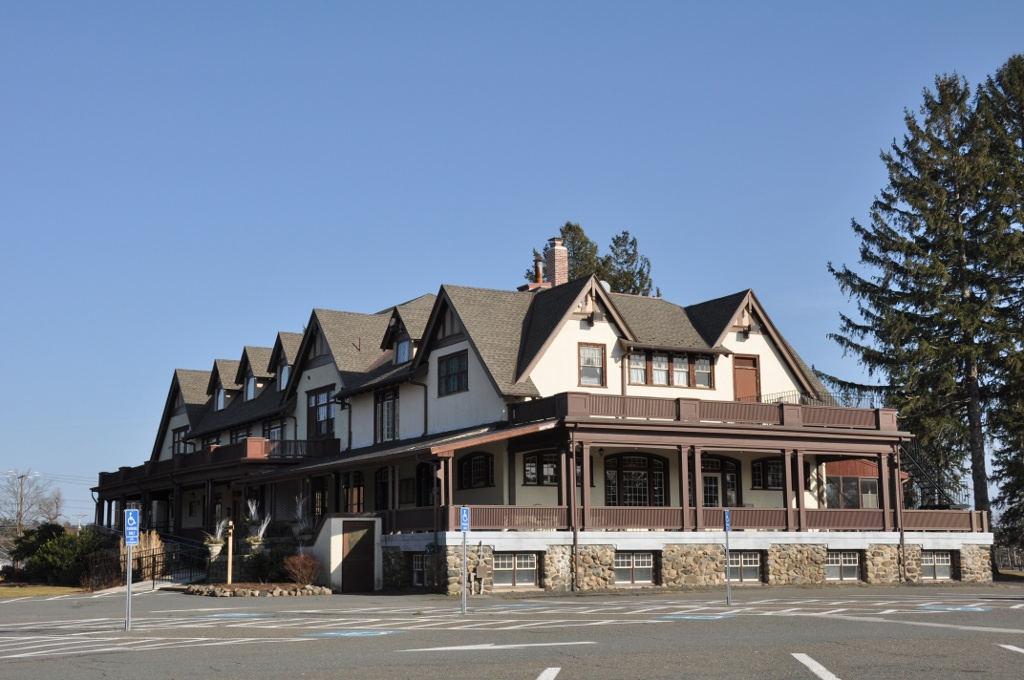

- Location within Massachusetts Location within the United States
- Location: Beverly, Massachusetts
- Coordinates: 42°33′52″N 70°53′43″W
- Built: 1910
- Architect: Henry Bailey Alden
- NRHP reference No.: 82000484
- Added to NRHP: November 26, 1982

The United Shoe Machinery Corporation Clubhouse is a historic clubhouse at 134 McKay Street in Beverly, Massachusetts. The building is now known as Beverly Golf and Tennis Clubhouse. The English Revival building was designed by Boston architect Henry Bailey Alden, and built in 1910 as a gift from the senior management of the United Shoe Machinery Corporation to its local employees. The club, which originally occupied 300 acres (120 ha), became a significant social center in Beverly, providing a place for all manner of social and recreational activities. The property was sold to a developer in 1971, who sold the clubhouse and 168 acres (68 ha) to the city of Beverly.

The clubhouse was listed on the National Register of Historic Places in 1982.

== See also ==
- National Register of Historic Places listings in Essex County, Massachusetts
