= Brick Block =

- U.S. National Register of Historic Places
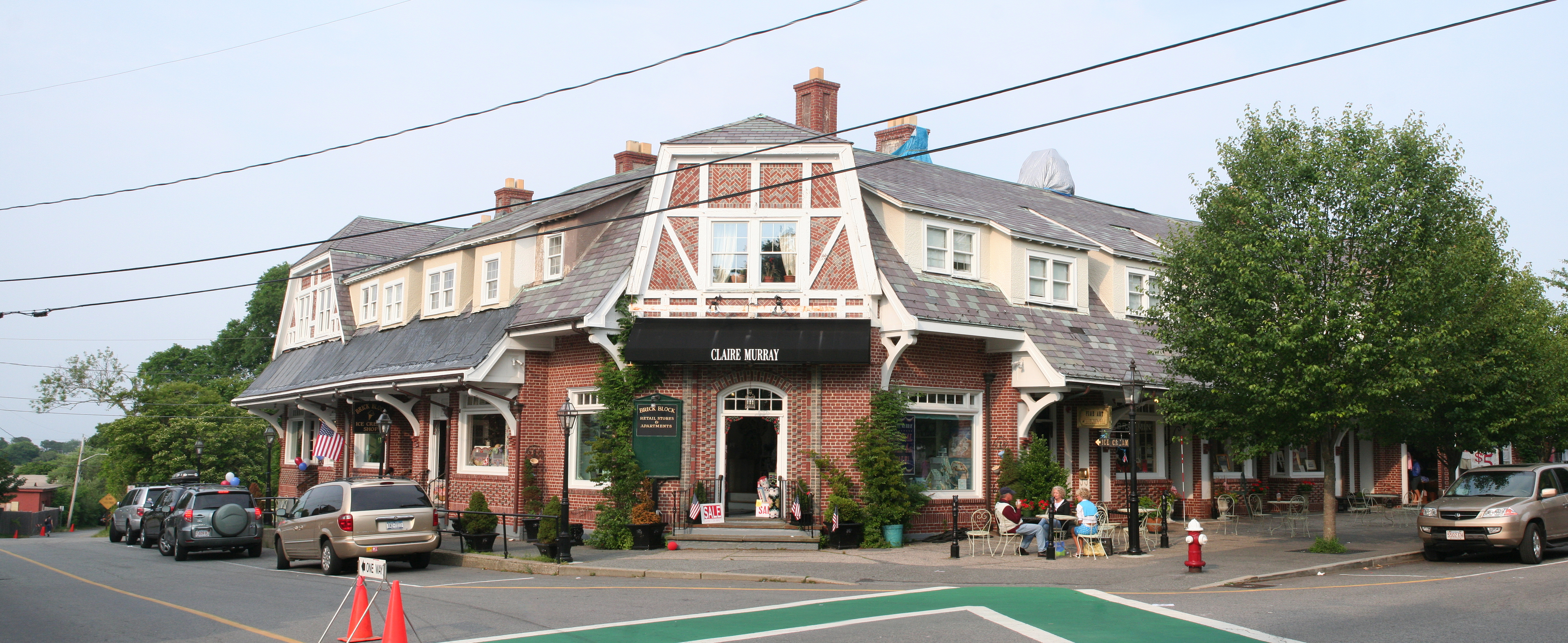

- Location within Cape Cod Location within Massachusetts Location within the United States
- Location: Chatham, Massachusetts
- Coordinates: 41°40′46″N 69°57′24″W
- Area: less than one acre
- Built: 1914
- Built by: Joseph Nickerson
- Architect: Henry Bailey Alden
- Architectural style: Tudor Revival
- NRHP reference No.: 79000323
- Added to NRHP: April 13, 1979

The Brick Block is a historic commercial building on Main Street and Chatham Bars Road in Chatham, Massachusetts. Built in 1914 by a master mason, it is a distinctive local landmark in downtown Chatham, and a showcase of the bricklaying art. The block was listed on the National Register of Historic Places in 1979.

== Description and history ==
The Brick Block occupies a prominent corner lot on Chatham's downtown Main Street, standing at the northeast corner with Chatham Bars Road. It is a 1 1/2-story structure, built out of brick with wooden trim, and is one of the largest buildings in the downtown. It is basically English Revival in style, with projecting eaves of its gabled roof supported by large wooden brackets. The roof is pierced by small shed dormers along each side, with large clipped-gable dormers at the ends and the angled corner. The smaller dormers are finished in stucco, while the larger dormers are decorated with a diversity of laid-brick shapes. The basic laying of bricks for the main walls is in either common or Flemish bond, but there are panel sections of decorative brick arrangements, and a soldier course of bricks runs above the foundation.

The block was built in 1914 by Joseph Nickerson, a master mason, to a design by Boston architect Henry Bailey Alden. It originally housed the local post office and shops on the first floor, and residences on the upper floor; this basic usage pattern continues today. Nickerson was a native of Worcester who was brought to Chatham to do the work; his family remained on the Cape, and continue to work as masons.

== See also ==
- National Register of Historic Places listings in Barnstable County, Massachusetts
