= Sophia Foord =

American educator and activist (1802–1885)

- Born: June 8, 1802; Milton, Massachusetts, U.S.
- Died: April 1, 1885 (aged 82); Dedham, Massachusetts, U.S.
- Resting place: Brookdale Cemetery, Dedham, Massachusetts, U.S.
- Occupation: Schoolteacher
- Known for: Activism; association with Louisa May Alcott, Ralph Waldo Emerson, and Henry David Thoreau

Sophia Foord (June 8, 1802 – April 1, 1885) was an American schoolteacher and activist from Massachusetts.

== Biography ==
Foord was the daughter of James Foord, the clerk of Norfolk County, Massachusetts. Born in the town of Milton, her family moved to Dedham by 1820. She lived nearby James Richardson. Foord became the first depositor at Dedham Savings.

Foord taught in the Dedham Middle School (later the Ames School) in 1833 before moving the Northampton, Massachusetts, to join the transcendentalist Northampton Association of Education and Industry. It was likely there that she met Amos Bronson Alcott, who convinced her to move to Concord, Massachusetts, to join a new school that ultimately never materialized. She lived with the Alcotts in Hillside in 1845.

While living with the Alcott family in Concord, she met Henry David Thoreau. Despite being 15 years older than him, she fell in love with him. She proposed marriage to him, but he declined. She had feelings for him for many years, which she would write about in letters to Louisa May Alcott. (Note: Louisa May Alcott once worked in the Richardson home.) Ralph Waldo Emerson was so impressed with Foord's teaching ability that he hired her to instruct his children.

Foord was politically active, including attending the first National Women's Rights Convention in Worcester, Massachusetts, in 1850; was involved in the abolition movement in Dedham in the late 1850s; and chaired the town's Ladies Soldiers Aid Society during the Civil War.

Foord spent the last years of her life in Dedham, living with her sister, Esther. She died in 1885 and was buried in Brookdale Cemetery in Dedham.

== Sources ==
- Parr, James L. (2009). Dedham: Historic and Heroic Tales From Shiretown. The History Press. ISBN 978-1-59629-750-0.
