= Eunice Davis =

American abolitionist (1800–1901)

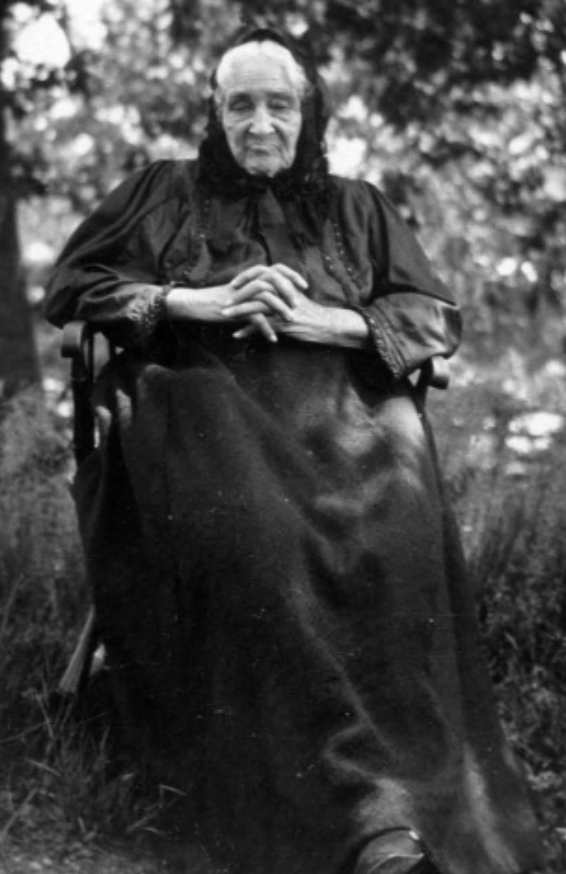
- Born: Eunice Russ; October 22, 1800; North Andover, Massachusetts, US
- Died: 1901 (aged 100–101); Boston, Massachusetts, US
- Burial place: Brookdale Cemetery, Dedham, Massachusetts, US
- Occupation: Abolitionist
- Known for: Founding the Boston Female Anti-Slavery Society
- Spouses: Robert Ames (m. 1819; died 1825); John Davis (after 1825)
- Children: 3

Eunice Russ Ames Davis (October 22, 1800 – 1901) was an American abolitionist and one of the founding members of the Boston Female Anti-Slavery Society. In 1896, The New York Times named her the "oldest living female abolitionist in the world". She was one of the first known black women to join the Daughters of the American Revolution.

== Early life and family ==
Eunice Davis was born Eunice Russ in North Andover, Massachusetts. She was of African, European, Penobscot, and Narragansett descent. Her father, Prince Ames, was a black American Revolutionary War patriot. Her mother, Eunice Russ, was born to a white mother and a Native American father.

Eunice married her first husband in 1819, Robert Ames. With Ames she had two sons and a daughter. Her family resided in Lowell, Massachusetts, until Eunice was widowed in 1825. Eunice moved to Boston following the death of her husband, where she married her second husband, John Davis. Davis was an African American Baptist minister.

== Daughters of the American Revolution ==
Due to her father's Revolutionary War service, Eunice joined the Daughters of the American Revolution on December 3, 1896. She was given the national number 16263 and became a member of the Old South DAR Chapter in Boston. Davis was presented with a gold spoon by the Daughters of the American Revolution on her 97th birthday.

== Abolitionist activities ==
Davis was a devout Baptist. She was the president of the first independent Baptist Female Society and attended the Zion church in Boston, where she met other abolitionists. Davis worked with abolitionists Margarett Scarlett, Eliza Ann Logan Lawton, and Anna Logan to fight segregation in Boston's public schools.

In 1833, Eunice became an officer and a founder of the Boston Female Anti-Slavery Society, where she helped to gather petition signatures in support of anti-slavery legislation. She actively supported other abolitionists, including William Lloyd Garrison, editor and publisher of The Liberator, which advocated against slavery among other issues. Support for Garrison caused a split in the Boston Female Anti-Slavery Society, as some members believed Garrison went too far with his anti-government and anti-church views in his newspaper. The people who did not support Garrison's views went to their own organization, the American and Foreign Anti-Slavery Society, in 1840.

In 1839, Davis and other members petitioned the Massachusetts legislature to denounce a law restricting interracial marriage. The law was ultimately repealed in 1843.

When in her nineties, The New York Times proclaimed her the "oldest living female abolitionist in the world".

== Death and legacy ==
Davis died in Boston in 1901, outliving her husband and children. She was buried at Brookdale Cemetery in Dedham, Massachusetts, where she lived at the end of her life.

Davis is considered by the Daughters of the American Revolution (DAR) to be a Real Daughter, meaning that she is a daughter, and not just a distant descendant, of a Revolutionary soldier or Patriot. She was a member of DAR's Old South Chapter of the DAR. Her grave was marked with a historic plaque by the Daughters of the American Revolution's President General Denise Doring VanBuren in 2022.
