= Frank J. Gethro =

American politician (1872–1919)

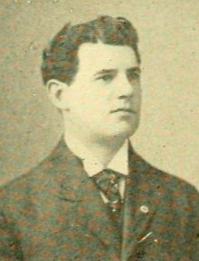

Member of the Massachusetts House of Representatives for the 9th Suffolk district
- In office 1906–1906

Member of the Boston Common Council
- In office 1903–1905

Personal details
- Born: April 20, 1872 Dedham, Massachusetts
- Died: August 9, 1919 (aged 47) Providence, Rhode Island
- Resting place: Brookdale Cemetery; Dedham, Massachusetts
- Party: Democratic
- Occupation: Tobacconist; Insurance agent Hairdresser; State representative Steamship captain

Francis Joseph Gethro (April 20, 1872 – August 9, 1919) was an American businessman and politician who represented Boston's Ward 9 in the Massachusetts House of Representatives.

== Early life ==
Gethro was born on April 20, 1872, in Dedham, Massachusetts. He was a member of the Boston Common Council from 1903 to 1905 and was elected to the Massachusetts House of Representatives in 1905. Outside of politics, Gethro worked in the tobacco and insurance businesses and was a hairdresser.

== Bribery investigation and expulsion ==
In the May 1906, a Suffolk County grand jury investigated members of the Massachusetts General Court, including Gethro, who were alleged to have accepted bribes to kill an anti-bucket shop bill. The investigation on May 12, 1906, ended without any indictments. The House Committee on Rules took up its own investigation shortly thereafter. On May 24, Representative Jacob H. Mock testified that he had been offered $50 by Gethro to vote against the anti-bucket shop bill. After finding out Mock had testified against him, Gethro confronted Mock in a State House corridor and punched him in the chest. On June 15, the committee issued its report to the House. It found that Gethro had approached members of the house and attempted to influence their vote by suggesting a monetary reward in exchange for voting against the anti-bucketing bill and recommended his expulsion. The committee found no evidence that any member accepted a bribe from Gethro, but did recommend the censure of one member, Simon Swig, for making conflicting statements before the committee. On June 21, the House voted 142 to 54 to expel Gethro.

Following his expulsion, Gethro alleged that the buying and selling of votes was common practice in the Massachusetts General Court and that House leadership had promised him protection from prosecution. He also stated that his fight with Mock was a prearranged "grandstand play". On June 22, 1906, Gethro and his legal counsel Daniel H. Coakley met with Suffolk County District Attorney John B. Moran to implicate other representatives in the bribery scandal. Gethro testified before a grand jury on December 18, 1906, however his testimony did not result in any indictments.

== Steamship industry ==
After leaving politics, Gethro became involved in the steamship industry in Boston. In 1911 he commissioned the Madeleine from the Irving Reed Shipyard. He used the Madeleine to ferry day laborers and haul supplies and equipment to Castle Island and other points throughout Boston Harbor. He also captained the Juliette, operated by the town of New Shoreham, Rhode Island, under lease to Gethro. In July 1919 he organized the Block Island, Newport and Providence Transportation Company. He leased, repaired, and refitted the steamship New Shoreham at great expense and planned to run a service from Block Island to Providence, Rhode Island. The company acquired dock space at the Old and New Harbors on Block Island, Transit Street in Providence, and the City Wharf in Newport, Rhode Island. He commissioned two new ships, the Frances and Loretta, from the Irving Reed Shipyard. On August 9, 1919, Gethro died suddenly while observing a fire drill aboard the New Shoreham. The company was taken over by Gethro's heirs, but the death of his brother Vincent the following year led to its demise.
