= Brookdale Cemetery =

Historic cemetery in Dedham, Massachusetts

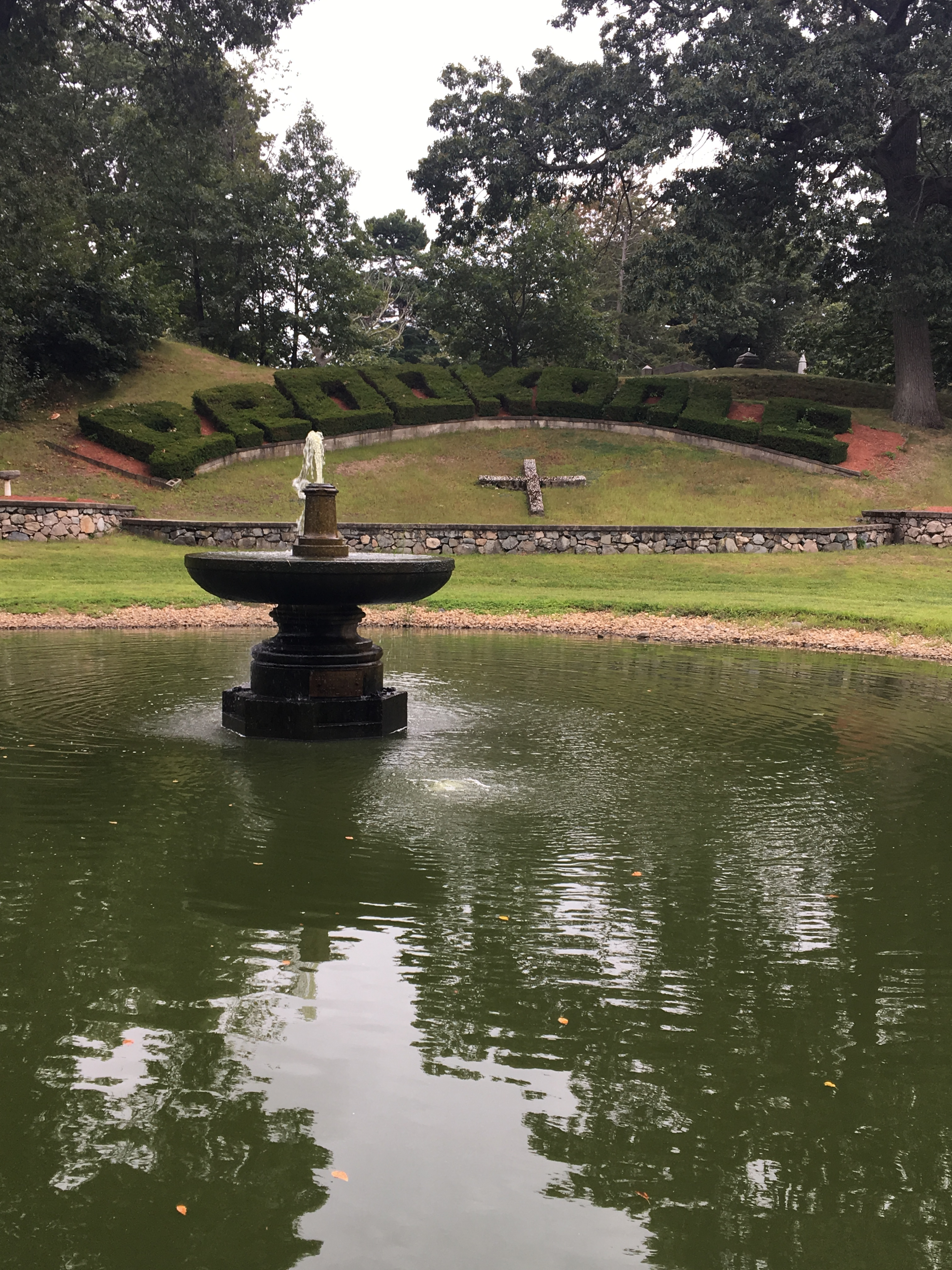
- The pond and fountain at the entrance to Brookdale Cemetery
- Interactive map of Brookdale Cemetery

Details
- Established: 1878
- Location: Dedham, Massachusetts
- Coordinates: 42.250283°N 71.165558°W
- Type: Public
- Owned by: Town of Dedham
- No. of graves: 28,000+
- Website: Brookdale Cemetery Viewer
- Find a Grave: Brookdale Cemetery

Brookdale Cemetery is an historic cemetery in Dedham, Massachusetts, United States. More than 28,000 people are buried there. Mother Brook runs behind it.

== History ==
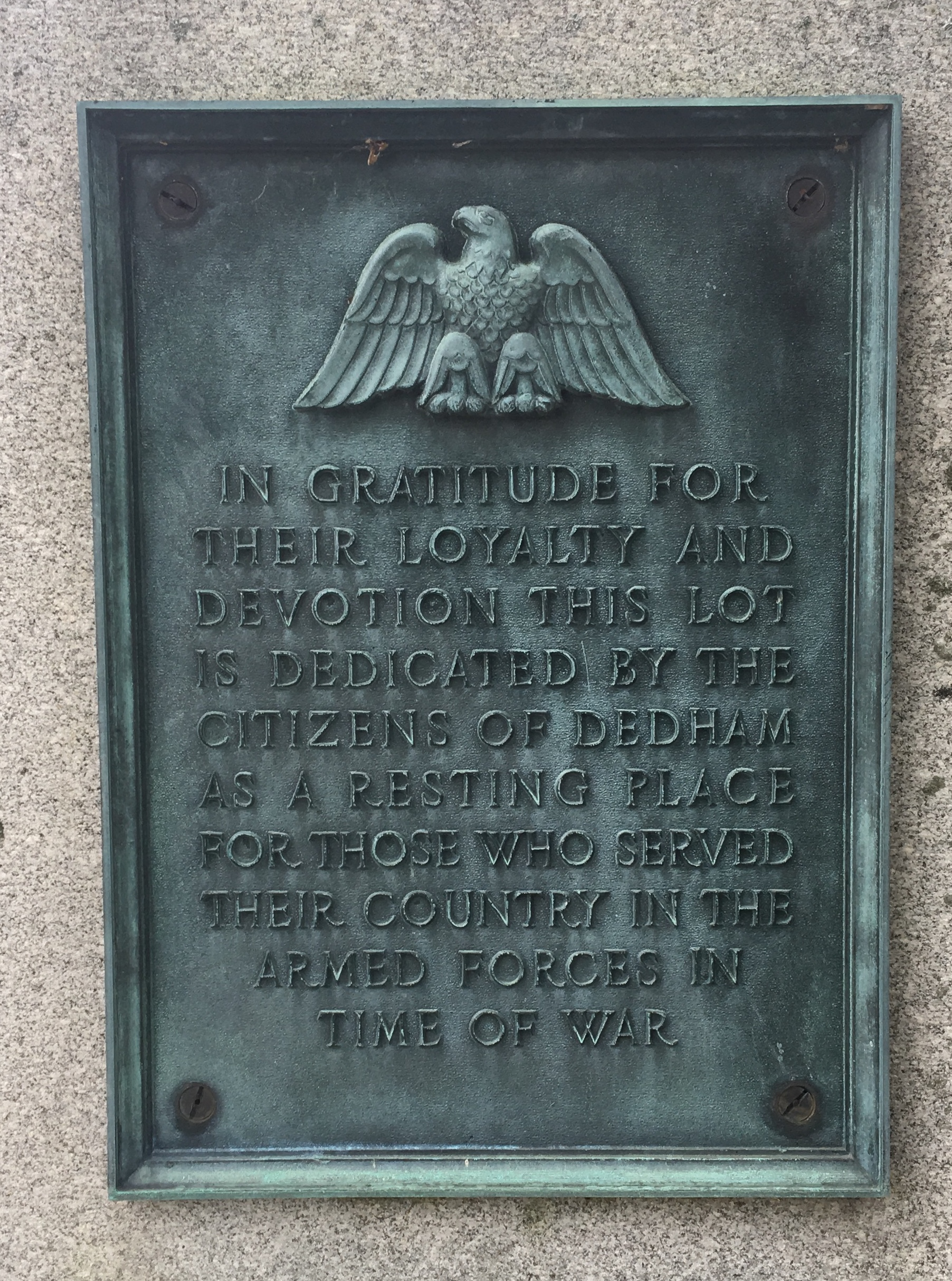
Detail of the entrance to Veterans Hill

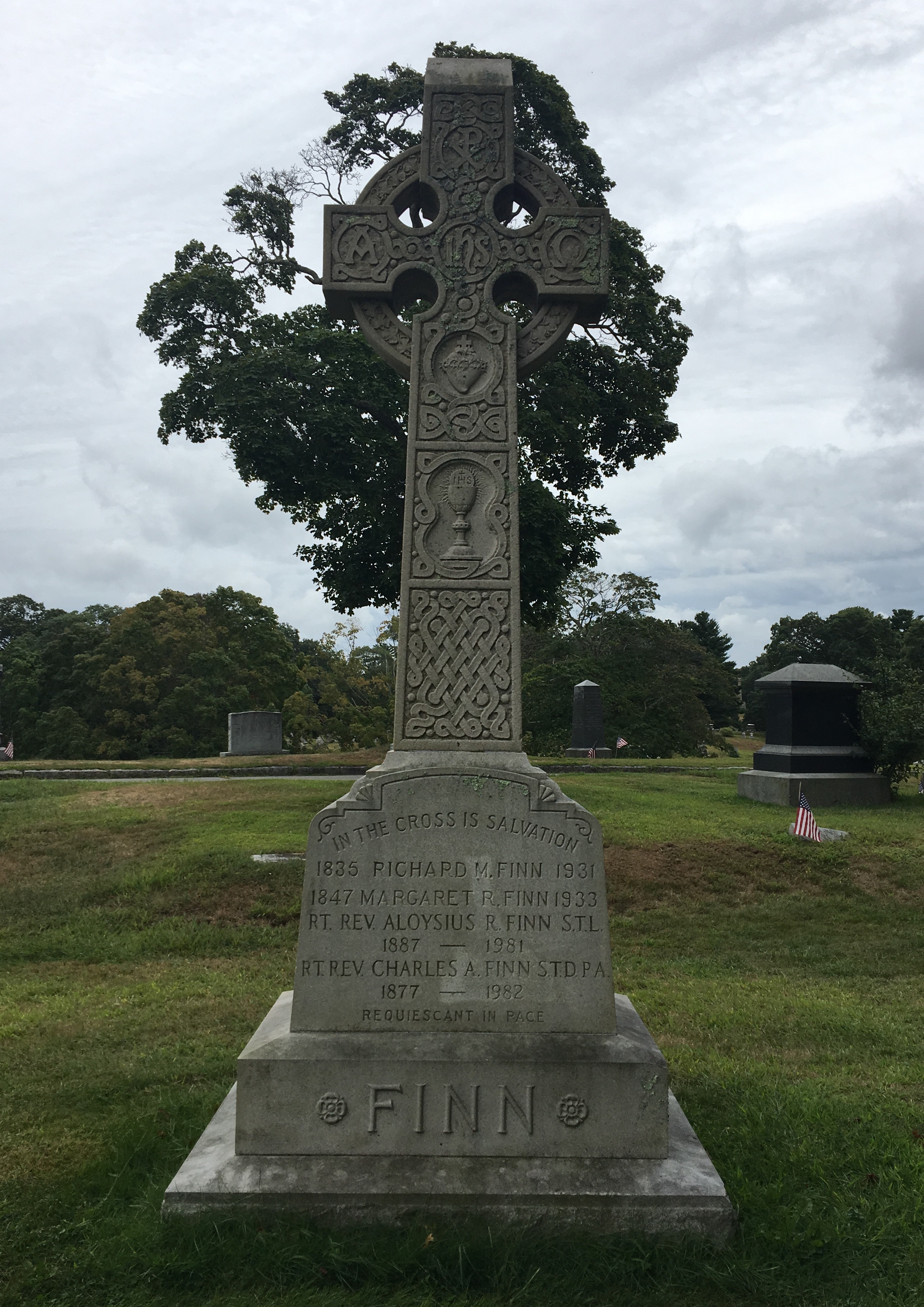
The gravestone of Fr. Charles A. Finn

For nearly 250 years after it was established, Old Village Cemetery was the only cemetery in Dedham. As immigrant workers moved to Dedham to take jobs in the mills along Mother Brook, it became clear that another cemetery would be needed.

Seeing a need for greater space, the Annual Town Meeting of 1876 established a committee to look into establishing a new cemetery. The committee, composed of the selectmen and Eratus Worthington, Eliphalet Stone, Royal O. Storrs, Winslow Warren, Edwin Whiting, and Alfred Hewins, was charged with determining how large the cemetery should be, locating land for it, and all other matters. Town Meeting accepted the committee's recommendation on October 20, 1877, and appropriated $8,150 to purchase 39 acres from Thomas Barrows (Note: Stone was married to Elizabeth Barrows and was a major landowner on nearby High Street.) and Thomas Motley with additional land from Walter E. White for a total of 40 acres. Several of those involved in the creation of the cemetery were the agents and superintendents of the mills along Mother Brook.

More than 10 acres of underbrush and trees were cleared in 1877 and more than a mile of roads were built. A plan of lots was laid out with roads named for trees, and paths named for shrubs or flowers. There were two points of entry, from East Street and Brookdale Avenue, with the main entrance leading to Ash Avenue.

Lots were laid out by Stone to be 15' by 20' and the first was sold in June 1878. The property was surrounded by 700' of picket fence and a stone wall. Three commissioners, appointed by the Selectmen, served three year terms and managed the cemetery. The garden cemetery was intended to be a place of rest and recreation for the entire town.

In March 1880, Town Meeting set aside a portion of the cemetery, just a block away from St. Mary's Church, for Catholics to be buried. The special section was bound by East Street and White's remaining land on the west and Spruce and Maple Avenues on the south and east. Beginning in 1889, 10% of all proceeds from lot sales were placed in the Perpetual Care Fund.

== Notable areas ==
The gateways were constructed of Quincy granite and the gates themselves of Michigan pine. Fences and hedges were not included in the plan, but a pond was dug. Inside the pond is a fountain, dedicated in May 1953 to Ebenezer T. Paul, and which was paid for in a bequest in the will of Ebenezer's wife, Marietta.

The receiving tomb was designed by Frederick R. Storrs (Note: Frederick was the son of Royal O. Storrs) inside of a heart shaped recess in a hill just inside the cemetery for those who died during the winter. The Gate Lodge Chapel, built in 1903, was designed by Henry Bailey Alden.

At the base of the hill with the Civil War monument is an oblong piece of granite stating simply, "Hermit." It marks the grave of James Gately, the Hermit of Hyde Park. In 2014, the Town was close to finishing an expansion providing more than 100 grave sites of the cemetery. Without the expansion, it would have been full in another two years.

== Veterans ==
After the Civil War, Eliphalet Stone donated a choice plot of land upon a hill and a monument to the sacrifice of Dedham's Union soldiers to the local Grand Army of the Republic chapter. On the hill, which was 200 feet (61 m) in circumference, was a monument including four cannons used in the war that were presumably confiscated from Confederate troops. The monument itself is a granite pedestal with the words "Repose," "Mespha," and "Gilead."

Using funds from the Federal Emergency Relief Administration, the Selectmen hired 50 men to work three days a week during the summer months beginning in 1934. The men cut down the hill bounded by Catalpa Walk, Cedar Avenue, and Hemlock Avenue, removed all necessary trees, removed large stones, and graded the land. At the request of the local chapters of the American Legion and the Veterans of Foreign Wars, the Selectmen designated a hill on the other side of Catapla Walk to bury veterans of the First World War. The work to prepare this land was also done by men employed through an ERA grant. A spot was prepared to place a monument at a later date.

On the grounds are memorials to veterans of the Korean War, the Vietnam War, the Fire Department, and veteran John "Roscoe" Maloney, longtime superintendent of cemeteries in Dedham. There are also monuments to all veterans who served in time of war, to those who served in the Gulf War, and to members of the police and public works departments.

== Notable burials ==
- Henry Bailey Alden (1862–1939), architect
- Benjamin H. Bailey (1829–1919), Unitarian minister
- John Andrew Barnes III (1945–1967), Medal of Honor recipient
- Eunice Davis (1800–1901), abolitionist
- Charles A. Finn (1877–1982), priest
- Sophia Foord (1802–1885), schoolteacher and activist
- James Gately (1810–1875), hermit
- Frank J. Gethro (1872–1919), businessman and politician
- William B. Gould (1837–1923), onetime slave and veteran of the American Civil War
- John Lathrop (1835–1910), associate justice of the Supreme Judicial Court of Massachusetts

== Works cited ==
- Dedham Historical Society (2001). Dedham. Arcadia Publishing. ISBN 978-0-7385-0944-0.
- Hanson, Robert Brand (1976). Dedham, Massachusetts, 1635–1890. Dedham Historical Society.
- Hurd, Duane Hamilton (1884). History of Norfolk County, Massachusetts: With Biographical Sketches of Many of Its Pioneers and Prominent Men. J. W. Lewis & Company.
- Lapomarda, Vincent A. (1992). The Knights of Columbus in Massachusetts (second ed.). Norwood, Massachusetts: Knights of Columbus Massachusetts State Council.
- Neiswander, Judith (2024). Mother Brook and the Mills of East Dedham. Damianos Publishing. ISBN 978-1-941573-66-2.
- Smith, Frank (1936). A History of Dedham, Massachusetts. Transcript Press, Incorporated.
- Worthington, Erastus (1900). Historical sketch of Mother Brook, Dedham, Mass: compiled from various records and papers, showing the diversion of a portion of the Charles River into the Neponset River and the manufactures on the stream, from 1639 to 1900. Dedham, MA: C.G. Wheeler.
