= James Gately =

English-born American hermit

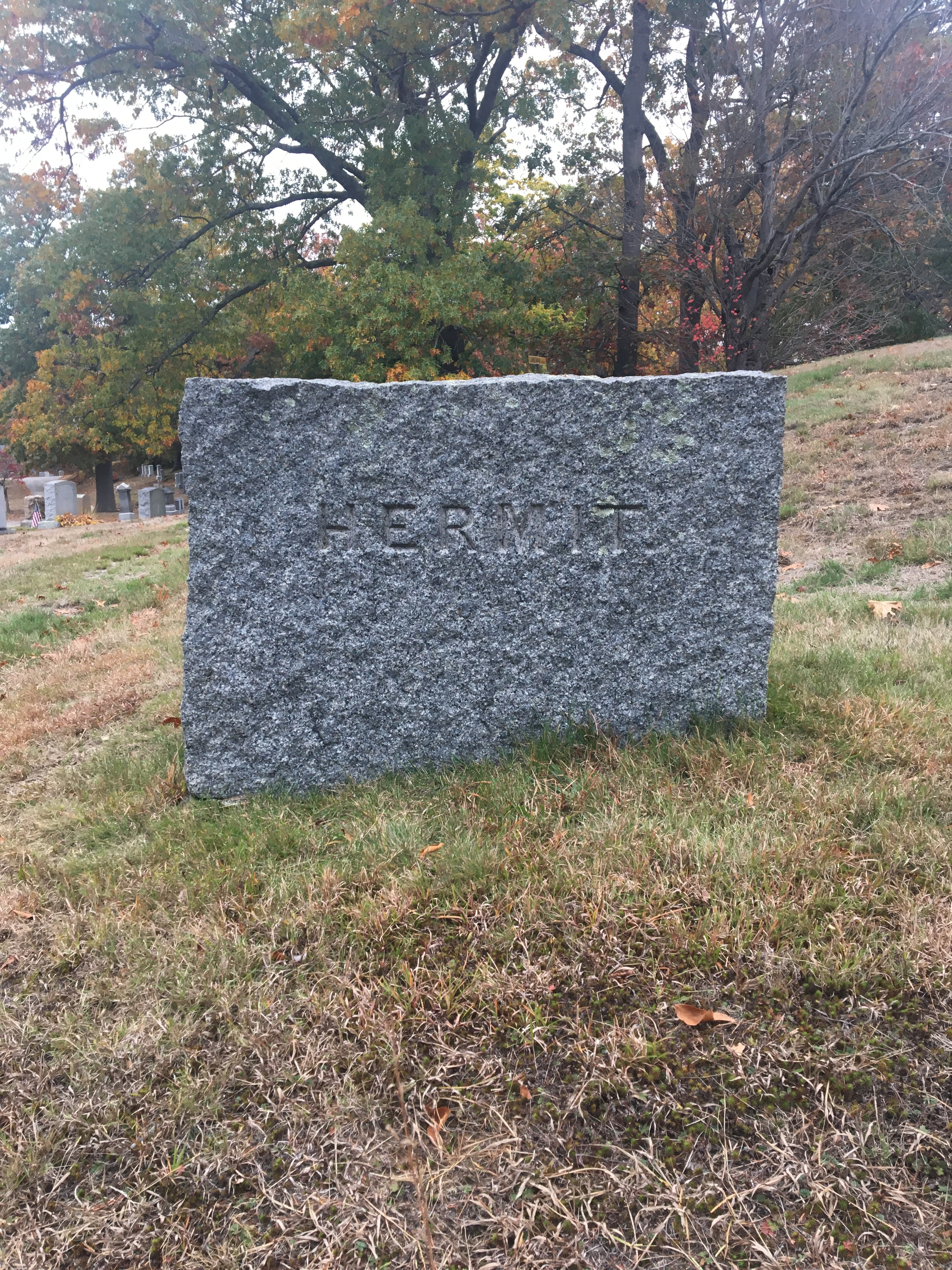
James Gately's grave

James Gately (1810–1875), also known as the Hermit of Hyde Park, was a 19th-century English-born American hermit. He was born in England in 1810 to wealthy parents. He studied at the University of Oxford. He had a son out of wedlock in 1850. He then sailed to Australia but returned the following year. He was still unable to marry the mother of his son, and so set sail for the United States instead, settling in Roxbury, Massachusetts.

He did not find success as a bird cage maker and taxidermist, and so set out for a life as a hermit in Hyde Park, Massachusetts. His estate was worth more than $1,500 ($41,471 in 2023 dollars) when he died in 1875. He had two sisters. Gately was buried in Brookdale Cemetery in Dedham, Massachusetts in a grave owned by William Chickering of that town. At the base of the hill with the Civil War monument is an oblong piece of granite stating simply, "Hermit."
