= Eliphalet Stone (Massachusetts politician) =

American politician

Colonel Eliphalet Stone
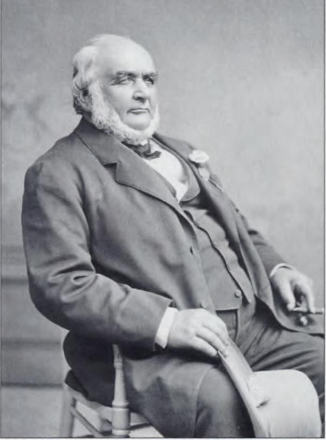

Member of the Massachusetts House of Representatives from the Dedham district
- In office 1861–1863
- In office 1869–1869

Personal details
- Born: May 12, 1813 Hubbardston, Massachusetts
- Died: February 5, 1886 (aged 72) Dedham, Massachusetts
- Party: Republican
- Spouse: Elizabeth Barrows

Col. Eliphalet Stone (May 12, 1813 – February 5, 1886) was an American politician.

== Personal life ==
Stone was born May 12, 1813, in Hubbardston, Massachusetts. His father died when he was six, and he was adopted by a relative. Though he was ambitious to acquire an education, his opportunities to do so were meager given the schooling provided to farmers boys in the district school at that time.

Stone was a major landowner along High Street in Dedham and lived at what is today 19 Mount Vernon Street in Dedham. He married Elizabeth Barrows, the daughter of Thomas Barrows, on October 10, 1839.

== Business career ==
He settled in Dedham, Massachusetts and engaged in a number of business pursuits. By 1833, he was largely engaged in the baking and grocery business, real estate and building, and for many years was the leading auctioneer in that part of Norfolk County. He was especially active in building residences in the east village of Dedham and labored earnestly to advance the interests of that part of the town.

== Agriculture ==
From early youth, Stone manifested a lively interest in agriculture and horticultural pursuits. He wrote many valuable papers on fruit culture.

== Political career ==
Stone represented Dedham, Massachusetts as a Republican in the Massachusetts House of Representatives in 1861, 1862, 1863, and 1869. He served on the committee that established Brookdale Cemetery.

== Philanthropy ==
It was said that benevolence was one of Stone's leading characteristics and no one was ever turned empty handed from his door. He donated the land upon which Dedham High School and Stone Park were built. He also donated a waiting room at the railroad stop, Stone Haven station, next to his home.

He was also a great supporter of the men of Dedham who served in the American Civil War. During the war, it was said that no person was more interested in the welfare of the soldiers than Stone. He sacrificed his business interests to visit the soldiers in the field and made arrangements to provide for their families. After the war, he donated a choice plot of land upon a hill and a monument to their sacrifice in Brookdale Cemetery to the local Grand Army of the Republic chapter.

== Death ==
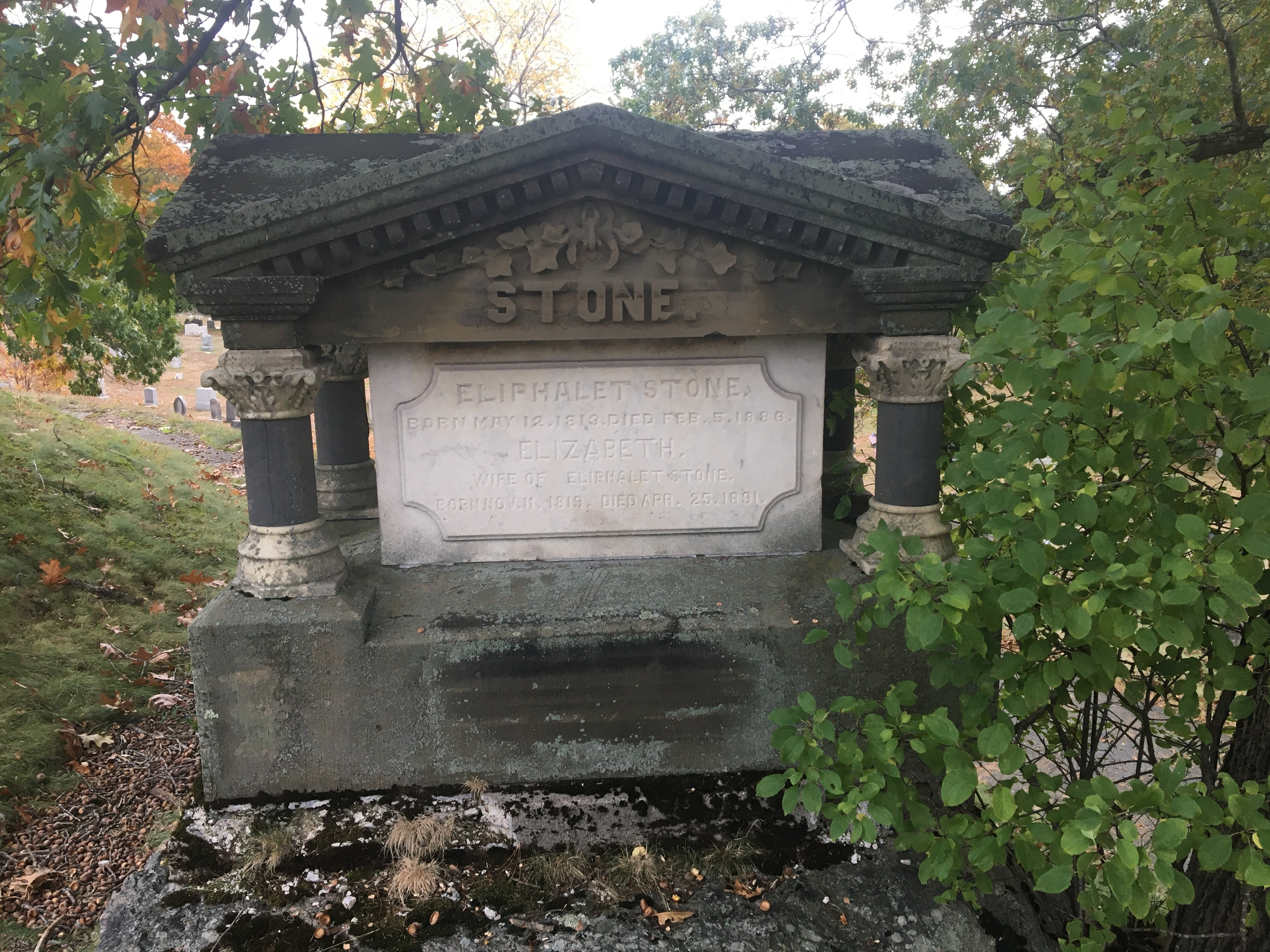
Eliphalet Stone's grave

Stone died in Dedham on February 5, 1886, of paralysis after a three-month illness.

== Works cited ==
- Dedham Historical Society (2001). Dedham. Arcadia Publishing. ISBN 978-0-7385-0944-0.
- Hurd, Duane Hamilton (1884). History of Norfolk County, Massachusetts: With Biographical Sketches of Many of Its Pioneers and Prominent Men. J. W. Lewis & Company.
- Smith, Frank (1936). A History of Dedham, Massachusetts. Transcript Press, Incorporated.
