= Gateley (surname) =

Gateley is a surname. Notable people with the surname include:

- Liz Gateley, American television producer
- Michael Gateley (1904–?), Indian field hockey player

== See also ==
- Gately, a surname
