= Thomas Barrows (mill owner) =

Massachusetts business executive (1795–1880)

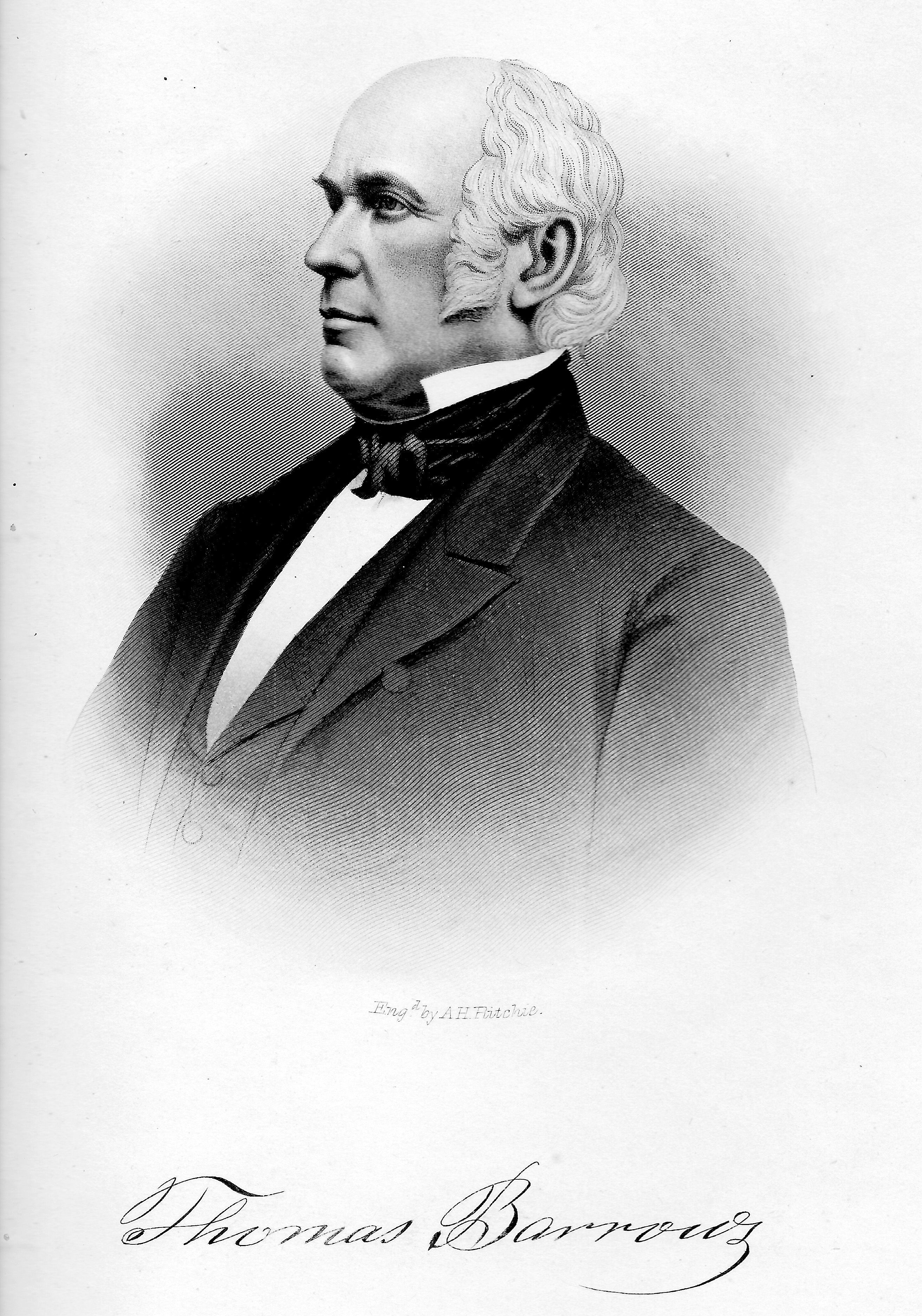
Thomas Barrows

Thomas Barrows (August 6, 1795 – May 7, 1880) was a business and civic leader from Dedham, Massachusetts.

== Personal life ==
Barrows was born August 6, 1795 in Middleboro, Massachusetts. He rose from a humble childhood to become the wealthiest mill owner in Dedham.

With his wife, Elizabeth (née Bosworth), (Note: Elizabeth died on August 6, 1860, aged 67 years. She was from Halifax, Massachusetts.) he had two sons and two daughters, including Thomas, (Note: Thomas died October 29, 1803, aged 38 years in a railroad accident.) Sarah, (Note: Sarah was the wife of C.H. Miller of Jamaica Plain.) and Elizabeth. (Note: Elizabeth was the wife of Eliphalet Stone.) Barrows had a grand Italianate mansion on High Street that was torn down in 1959 to make room for St. Mary's parking lot. He also owned large tracts of land on both sides of High Street, which he gradually sold to be developed into house lots.

He died May 7, 1880, and is buried at the Old Village Cemetery. Barrows Street in Dedham, where he held some property, is named for him.

== Career ==
In 1812, he left the family farm to work at a Middleboro cotton mill. Two years later he worked at a different mill in Wrentham, Massachusetts. He later returned to Middleboro to become the superintendent of a mill and remained there for five years.

He then took a position in Halifax, Massachusetts until 1825, at which point he was hired by Benjamin Bussey and George H. Kuhn to work as the superintendent overseeing day-today operations at their mill on Mother Brook. He worked at several mills on Mother Brook.

Barrows retired in 1864 when the mill was sold. On this occasion, he was given two silver services, including a salver, pitcher, and goblets, by the employees and the owners of the mills where he worked.

Barrows soon after purchased another mill on Mother Brook. (Note: Hurd and Parr differ on when Barrows purchased the Mill. Hurd says it was shortly after the mill was sold in 1864. Parr says it was in 1863.) He made large additions to the mill, including a three-story ell. He also improved the machinery, including replacing the water wheels with turbines and adding a steam engine. With the additions, he transformed it into a woolen mill. He sold the mill in 1872, during a downturn in the woolen industry.

Barrows was also elected the president of the Dedham Institution for Savings in 1875, held three patents and was the part owner of a mill in Dracut, Massachusetts.

== Civic life ==
=== Brookdale Cemetery ===
Seeing a need for greater cemetery space, Dedham's Annual Town Meeting of 1876 established a committee to look into establishing a new cemetery. The committee, composed of the selectmen and Eratus Worthington, Eliphalet Stone, (Note: Stone was married to Elizabeth Barrows, the daughter of Thomas Barrows.) Royal O. Storrs, Winslow Warren, Edwin Whiting, and Alfred Hewins, was charged with determining how large the cemetery should be, locating land for it, and all other matters.

Town Meeting accepted the committee's recommendation on October 20, 1877, and appropriated $8,150 to purchase 39 acres from Barrows and Thomas Motley with additional land from Walter E. White for a total of 40 acres. Several of those involved in the creation of Brookdale Cemetery were the agents and superintendents of the mills along Mother Brook.

The Town of Dedham purchased another portion of his estate in 1976 to develop the O'Neil Drive housing complex for senior citizens, and then another 2 acres from St. Mary's in 2009. The other half of the St. Mary's parking lot was sold and developed into private homes in 2011.

=== Other ===
During the bicentennial celebrations in Dedham in 1836, Barrows served as a vice president of the dinner held for 600 people.

He also served on the building committee for the new Avery School in 1844, petitioned Norfolk County to widen High Street in 1874, and was otherwise "committed to local improvement and active in civic affairs."

In his obituary, it was said that "as the 'fountain head' of East Dedham, he is entitled to much of the credit for the prosperity of that place."

== Works cited ==
- Davis, Stephen Robert (1973). From Plowshares to Spindles: Dedham, Massachusetts 1790–1840 (Ph.D thesis). University of Wisconsin.
- Dedham Historical Society (2001). Images of America: Dedham. Arcadia Publishing. ISBN 978-0-7385-0944-0.
- Haven, Samuel Foster (1837). An Historical Address Delivered Before the Citizens of the Town of Dedham, on the Twenty-first of September, 1836, Being the Second Centennial Anniversary of the Incorporation of the Town. H. Mann.
- Neiswander, Judith (2024). Mother Brook and the Mills of East Dedham. Damianos Publishing. ISBN 978-1-941573-66-2.
- Smith, Frank (1936). A History of Dedham, Massachusetts. Transcript Press, Incorporated.
- Hurd, Duane Hamilton (1884). History of Norfolk County, Massachusetts: With Biographical Sketches of Many of Its Pioneers and Prominent Men. J. W. Lewis & Company.
- Tritsch, Electa Kane (1986). Building Dedham. Dedham Historical Society.
- Worthington, Erastus (1900). Historical sketch of Mother Brook, Dedham, Mass: compiled from various records and papers, showing the diversion of a portion of the Charles River into the Neponset River and the manufactures on the stream, from 1639 to 1900. Dedham, MA: C.G. Wheeler.
