= Henry Bailey Alden =

American architect

- Born: June 24, 1862; Somerville, Massachusetts
- Died: August 20, 1939 (aged 77)
- Occupation: Architect
- Years active: 1880s–1939
- Notable work: Endicott Estate, Chatham Bars Inn, United Shoe Machinery Corporation Building

Henry Bailey Alden (June 24, 1862 – August 20, 1939) was an American architect practicing in Boston, Massachusetts.

== Career ==
Alden attended the Massachusetts Institute of Technology, graduating in 1886. Before establishing his own practice, Alden worked as a draftsman in the office of the City Architect of Boston, then led by Edmund M. Wheelwright. He had offices at various times at 6 Beacon Street and 23 Court Street in Boston. He was a member of the American Institute of Architects.

Among Alden's notable works are the Endicott Estate (1904) in Dedham, the United Shoe Machinery Corporation Clubhouse (1910) in Beverly, the Chatham Bars Inn and Brick Block in Chatham (both 1914) and the United Shoe Machinery Corporation Building (1928, with Parker, Thomas & Rice) in Boston, among others. He also designed the gardener's cottage on the Endicott Estate and the Gate Lodge Chapel at Brookdale Cemetery, both in Dedham. Alden also was the architect for several home remodelings in the Back Bay neighborhood of Boston.

== Personal life ==
Alden was born June 24, 1862, in Somerville, Massachusetts to Henry C. and Emma F. (née Bailey) Alden. He died, unmarried, on August 20, 1939. His ashes are interred in Brookdale Cemetery.

== Gallery of architectural works ==
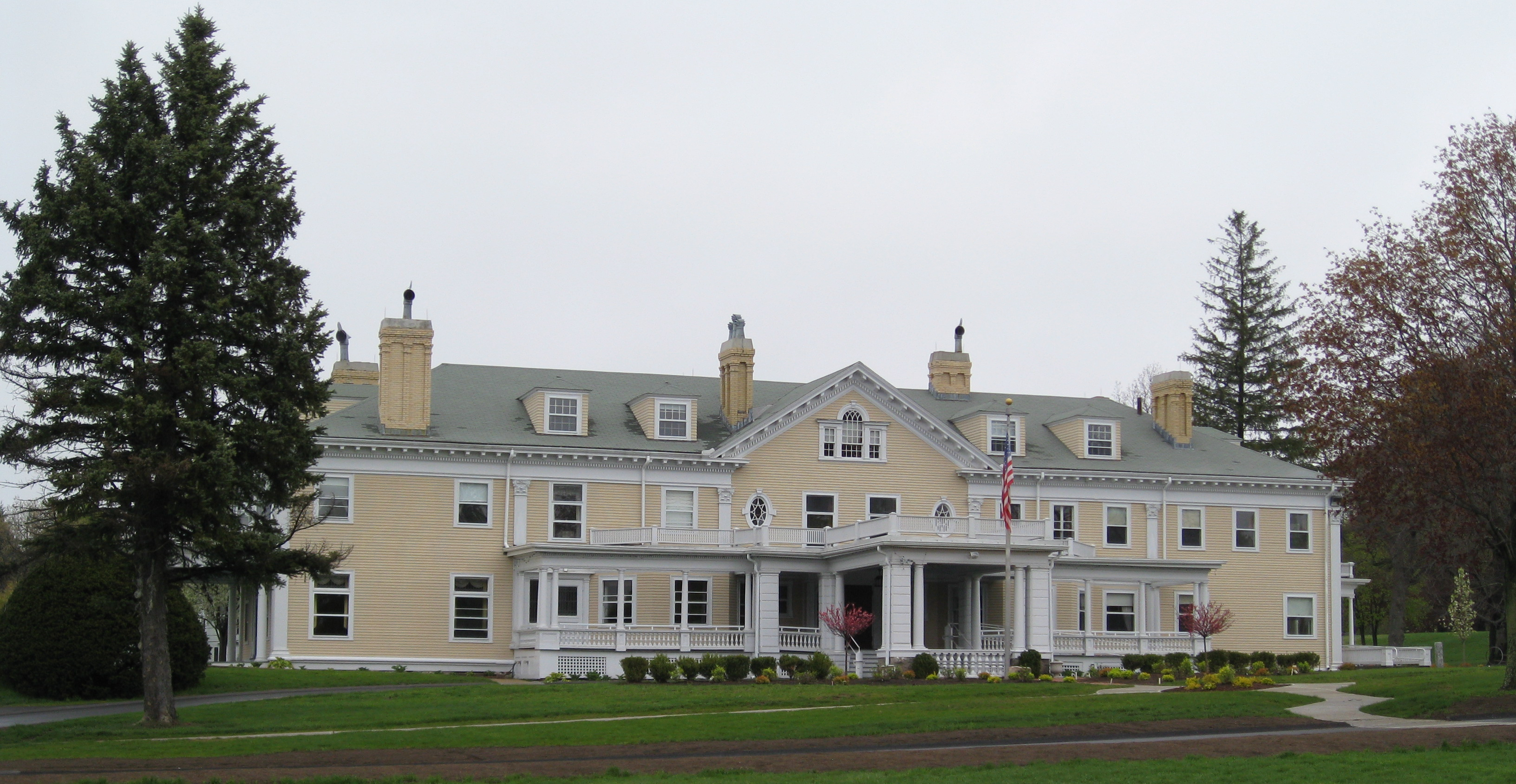
Endicott Estate, Dedham, Massachusetts, 1904.

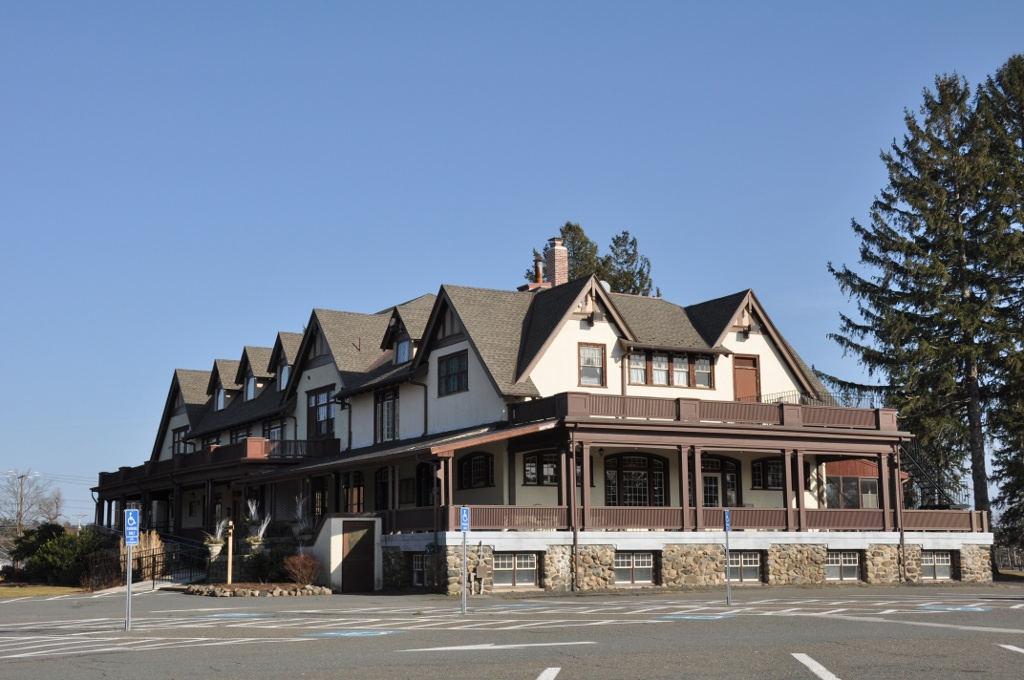
United Shoe Machinery Corporation Clubhouse, Beverly, Massachusetts, 1910.

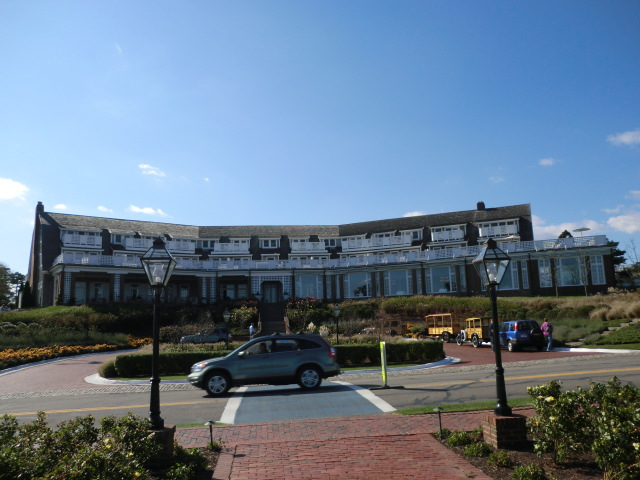
Chatham Bars Inn, Chatham, Massachusetts, 1914.

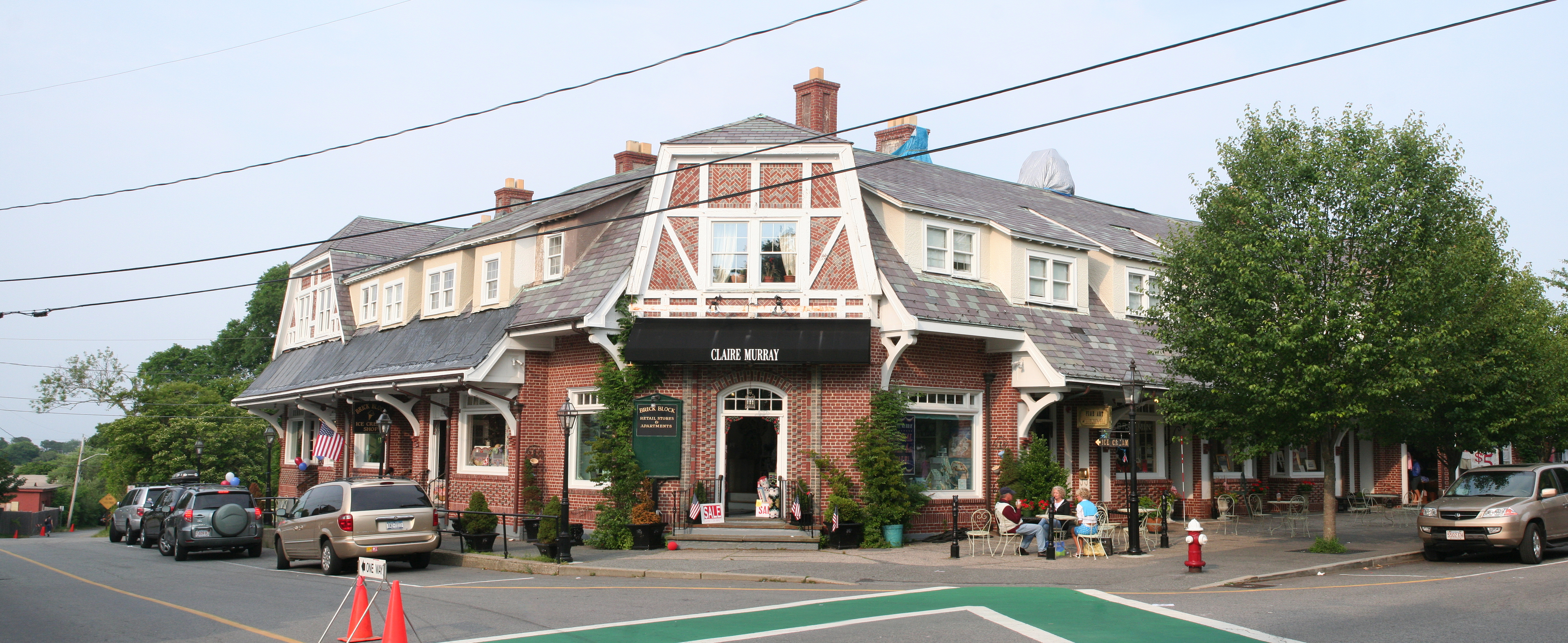
Brick Block, Chatham, Massachusetts, 1914.

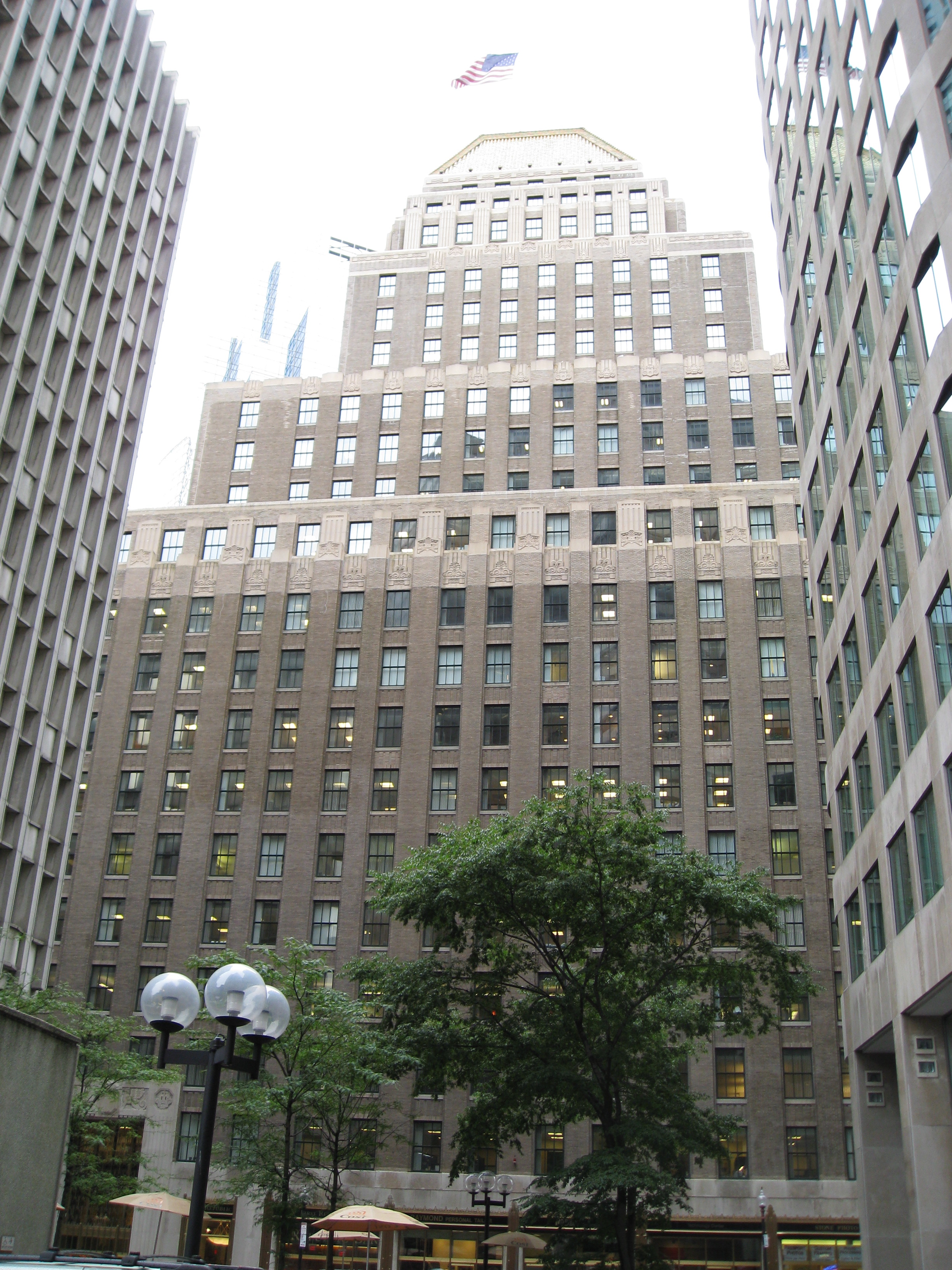
United Shoe Machinery Corporation Building, Boston, Massachusetts, 1928.

== Works cited ==
- Smith, Frank (1936). A History of Dedham, Massachusetts. Transcript Press, Incorporated.
