= Sullivan's Corner Historic District =

Historic district in Massachusetts, United States

- U.S. National Register of Historic Places
- U.S. Historic district
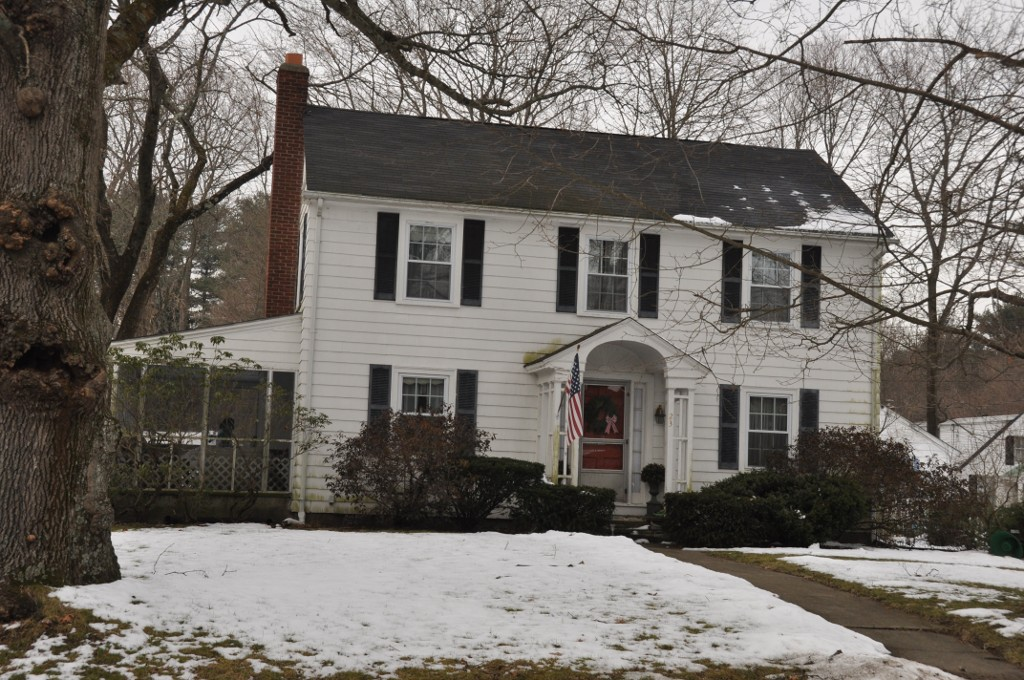
- 23 Seekonk Street

- Location within Massachusetts Location within the United States
- Location: Roughly the junction of Main, Needham, & Seekonk Sts., Norfolk, Massachusetts
- Coordinates: 42°07′14″N 71°18′39″W
- Area: 18 acres (7.3 ha)
- NRHP reference No.: 12000340
- Added to NRHP: June 15, 2012

Sullivan's Corner Historic District is a historic district encompassing a historical rural crossroads in northeastern Norfolk, Massachusetts. The 18-acre (7.3 ha) district includes Norfolk's oldest cemetery, established c. 1736, and five 18th- to early 20th-century buildings currently used as residences. The core of the old cemetery is on the northeast corner of Seekonk and Main Streets. The cemetery was enlarged north and east from that point in the 19th century. Four of the five houses in the district face the cemetery across Seekonk Street; the fifth, 1 Needham Street, lies across Main Street at the corner, and is one of Norfolk's best-preserved Greek Revival buildings. The building on the corner's northwest corner, Sullivan's Store, was built c. 1913, and is still somewhat recognizable as a corner store of the period, despite its conversion to residential use. It is Norfolk's only commercial building from that period.

The district was added to the National Register of Historic Places in 2012.

== See also ==
- National Register of Historic Places listings in Norfolk County, Massachusetts
