= Cohasset Common Historic District =

Historic district in Massachusetts, United States

- U.S. National Register of Historic Places
- U.S. Historic district
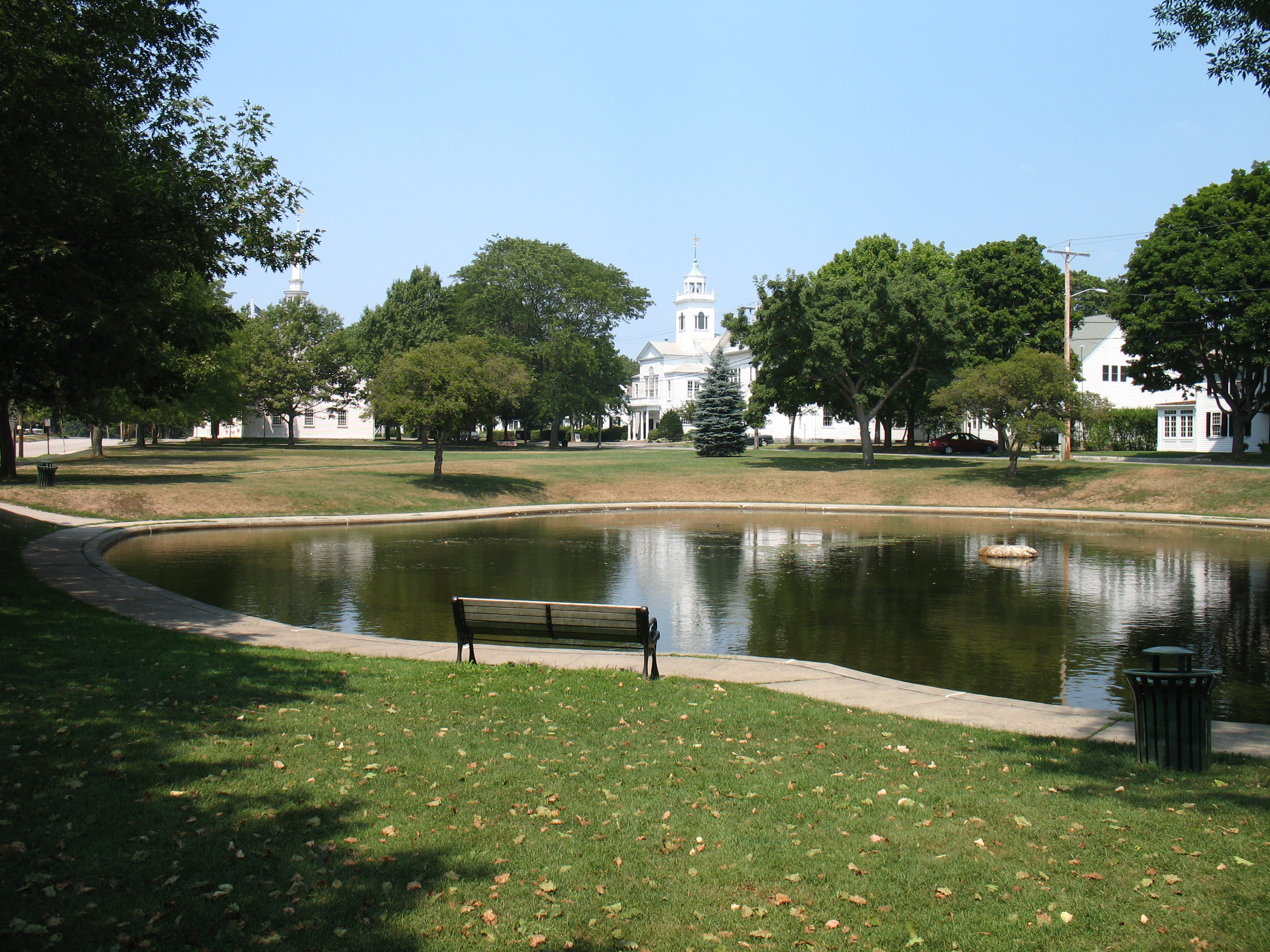

- Location within Massachusetts Location within the United States
- Location: Cohasset, Massachusetts
- Coordinates: 42°14′32″N 70°48′10″W
- Area: 24 acres (9.7 ha)
- Built: 1713
- Architect: Cram, Goodhue & Ferguson; Stutson, James
- Architectural style: Late Victorian, Greek Revival, Early Republic
- NRHP reference No.: 96000058
- Added to NRHP: February 28, 1996

The Cohasset Common Historic District is a historic district encompassing the historic town center of Cohasset, Massachusetts. It is centered on the town common, which is bounded by Highland Ave., N. Main St., William B. Long, Jr., Rd. and Robert E. Jason Road. The district was added in 1996 to the National Register of Historic Places.

== Description and history ==
Cohasset Common is located in northeastern Cohasset was laid out as common land at the earliest division of lands in what is now Cohasset (but was then part of Hingham) in 1670. Main Street, its southwestern bound, was formally demarcated as a road in 1685 (it had previously been little more than a cattle track), and Highland Avenue, its northeastern boundary, was laid out in 1685. Cohasset built its first meeting house in 1717, and was incorporated in 1770. The common is now lined by houses, churches, and the town hall, most of which were built between the mid-18th and mid-19th century. The common features a number of memorials, primarily commememorating the town's military citizens and dead. The historic district covers 24 acres (9.7 ha), and includes 49 (out of 54) historically significant properties.

== See also ==
- National Register of Historic Places listings in Norfolk County, Massachusetts
