= Cobb's Tavern =

- U.S. National Register of Historic Places
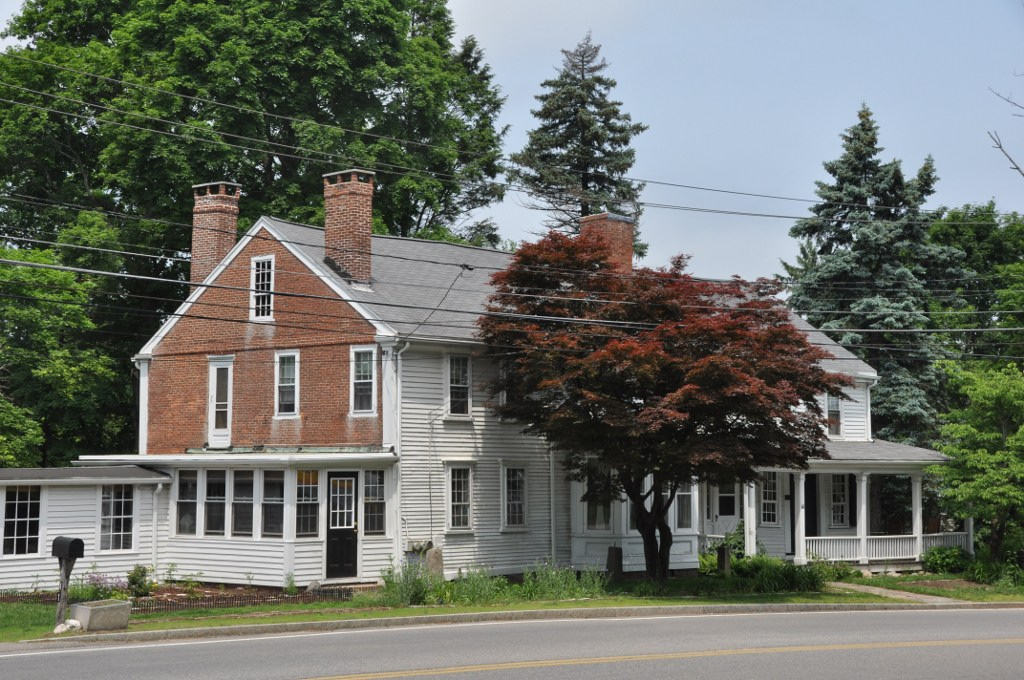

- Location within Massachusetts Location within the United States
- Location: 41 Bay Road, Sharon, Massachusetts
- Coordinates: 42°8′14″N 71°8′58″W
- Built: 1740
- Architectural style: Colonial
- NRHP reference No.: 74000383
- Added to NRHP: August 7, 1974

Cobb's Tavern is a historic colonial tavern building in Sharon, Massachusetts. It is a 2 1/2-story wood-frame building, with brick end walls, a central chimney, and a pair of chimneys near the left wall. A single-story porch extends across the building's rightmost five bays. The original part of the house was built c. 1740, and is known to have served as a tavern for most of the 19th century. It also housed the East Sharon Post Office between 1817 and 1895. It is now a private residence.

The building was listed on the National Register of Historic Places in 1974.

== See also ==
- National Register of Historic Places listings in Norfolk County, Massachusetts
