= Capt. Josiah Pratt House =

Historic house in Massachusetts, United States

- U.S. National Register of Historic Places
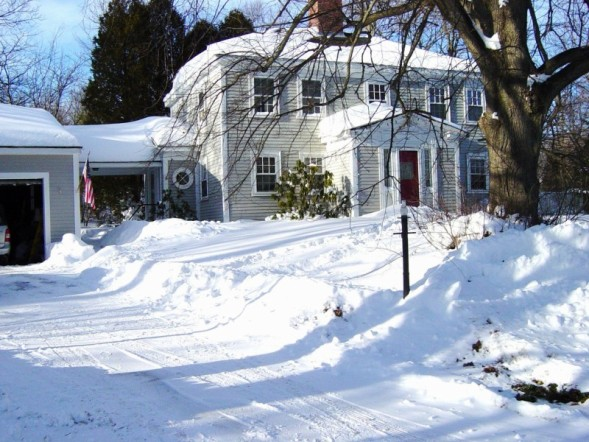

- Location within Massachusetts Location within the United States
- Location: Foxboro, Massachusetts
- Coordinates: 42°3′48″N 71°12′3″W
- Built: 1760
- Architectural style: Georgian
- NRHP reference No.: 83000598
- Added to NRHP: April 21, 1983

The Capt. Josiah Pratt House is a historic house at 141 East Street in Foxboro, Massachusetts. It is a 2 1/2-story wood-frame house, five bays wide, with a hip roof, central chimney, and clapboard siding. Its centered entrance is set in a projecting gable-roofed vestibule. The house was built c. 1760, and is a well-preserved example of Georgian architecture. The house was owned by Captain Josiah Pratt, a local military leader during the American Revolutionary War and a locally prominent citizen. He, and also some of his descendants, served as town selectman.

The house was listed on the National Register of Historic Places in 1983.

== See also ==
- National Register of Historic Places listings in Norfolk County, Massachusetts
