= Vine Lake Cemetery =

Historic cemetery in Massachusetts, United States

- U.S. National Register of Historic Places
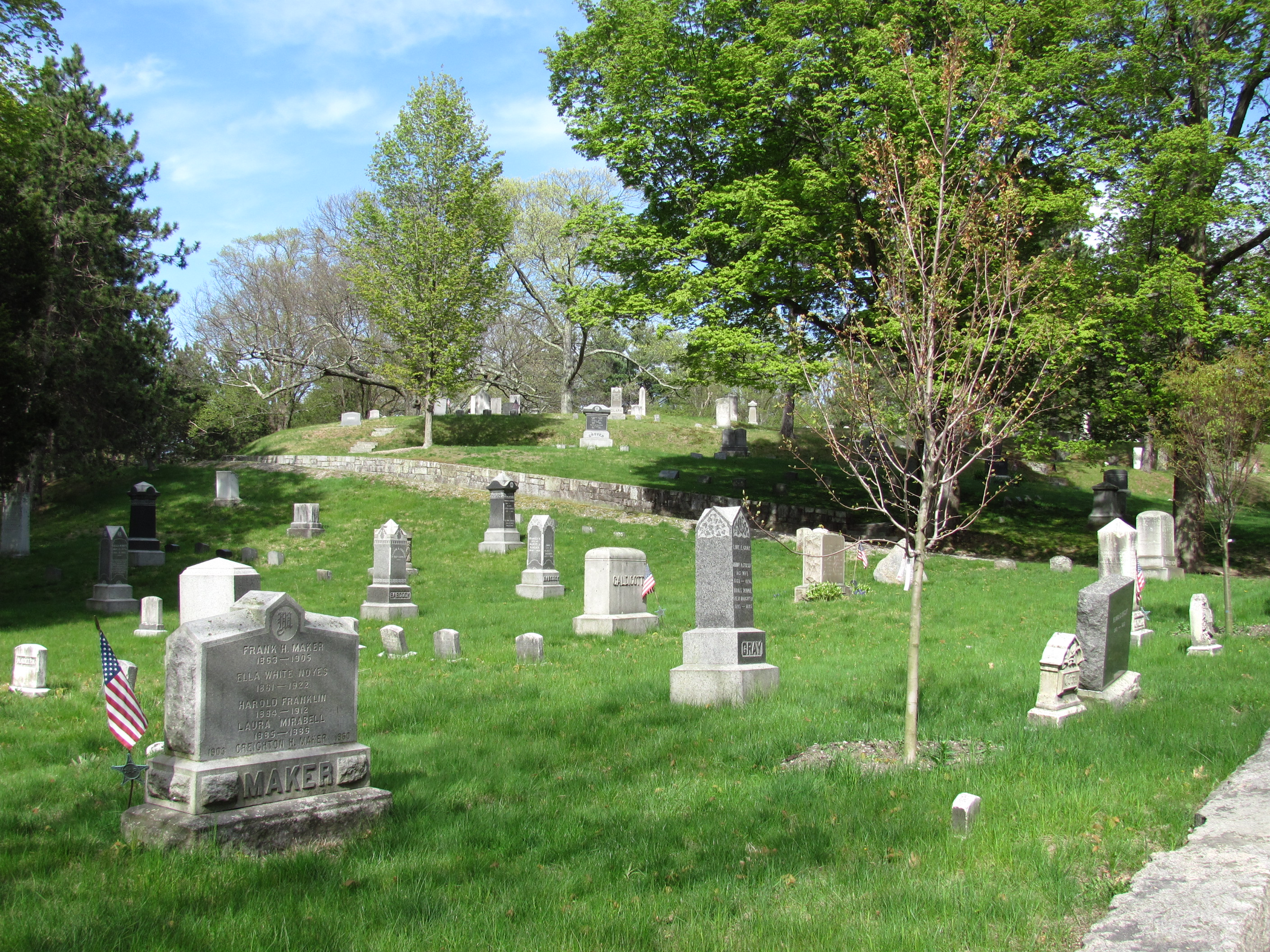
- Vine Lake Cemetery

- Location within Massachusetts Location within the United States
- Location: Medfield, Massachusetts
- Coordinates: 42°11′10″N 71°18′56″W
- Area: 32 acres (13 ha)
- Built: 1651
- NRHP reference No.: 05000277
- Added to NRHP: April 14, 2005

Vine Lake Cemetery is a historic cemetery on Main Street in Medfield, Massachusetts. First established in 1651, this 32-acre (13 ha) cemetery has grown and evolved over the centuries, and remains the town's only public cemetery. Its sections include the original colonial burying ground, a section in the rural cemetery style fashionable in the 19th century, and modern sections laid out in the 20th century. The oldest dated marker is from 1661.

The cemetery was listed on the National Register of Historic Places in 2005.

== See also ==
- National Register of Historic Places listings in Norfolk County, Massachusetts
