= Tolman-Gay House =

Historic house in Massachusetts, United States

- U.S. National Register of Historic Places
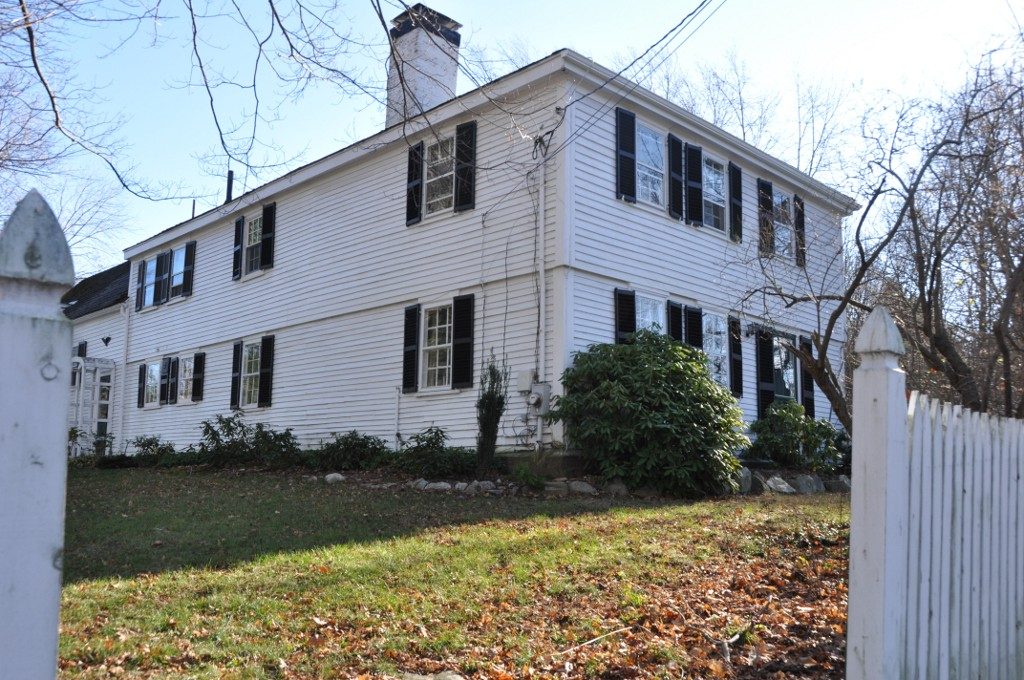

- Location within Massachusetts Location within the United States
- Location: 1196 Central Ave., Needham, Massachusetts
- Coordinates: 42°16′49″N 71°15′13″W
- Area: 1 acre (0.40 ha)
- Built: 1743
- Architect: Nathaniel Tolman
- Architectural style: Georgian
- NRHP reference No.: 82004419
- Added to NRHP: June 1, 1982

The Tolman-Gay House is a historic house at 1196 Central Avenue in Needham, Massachusetts. Built in 1743, it is a well-preserved example of mid-18th century architecture, which was occupied for nearly two centuries by members of two of Needham's early families. It was listed on the National Register of Historic Places in 1982.

== Description and history ==
The Tolman-Gay House is located in what is now a residential area west of the town center, on the east side of Central Avenue just south of its junction with Gay Street. It is a two-story wood-frame structure, originally built in an L shape, and now covered by a hipped roof. It has a narrow three-bay facade roughly facing west toward the street, and is elongated by the addition of a modern kitchen and garage to the rear. The old portion of the house has a central chimney dividing the ground floor into a parlor and a kitchen. The interior retains period finishes and woodwork.

The house was built in 1743 by Nathaniel Tolman, around the time of his marriage. Tolman's son John was prominent in the local militia, serving in the American Revolutionary War in the Battles of Lexington and Concord, the Siege of Boston, and the Saratoga campaign. He remained active in the militia after the war, and was activated for the War of 1812 but saw no service. Tolman was also active in civic affairs, serving as assessor and as an agent in negotiations over the separation of Needham's West Parish (now Wellesley). The house's next owner was Jonathan Gay, a military compatriot of Tolman's who was also from an old Needham family. Gay was a schoolteacher and served in the state legislature. The house remained in the Gay family until 1923.

== See also ==
- National Register of Historic Places listings in Norfolk County, Massachusetts
