= Kingsbury-Whitaker House =

Historic house in Massachusetts, United States

- U.S. National Register of Historic Places
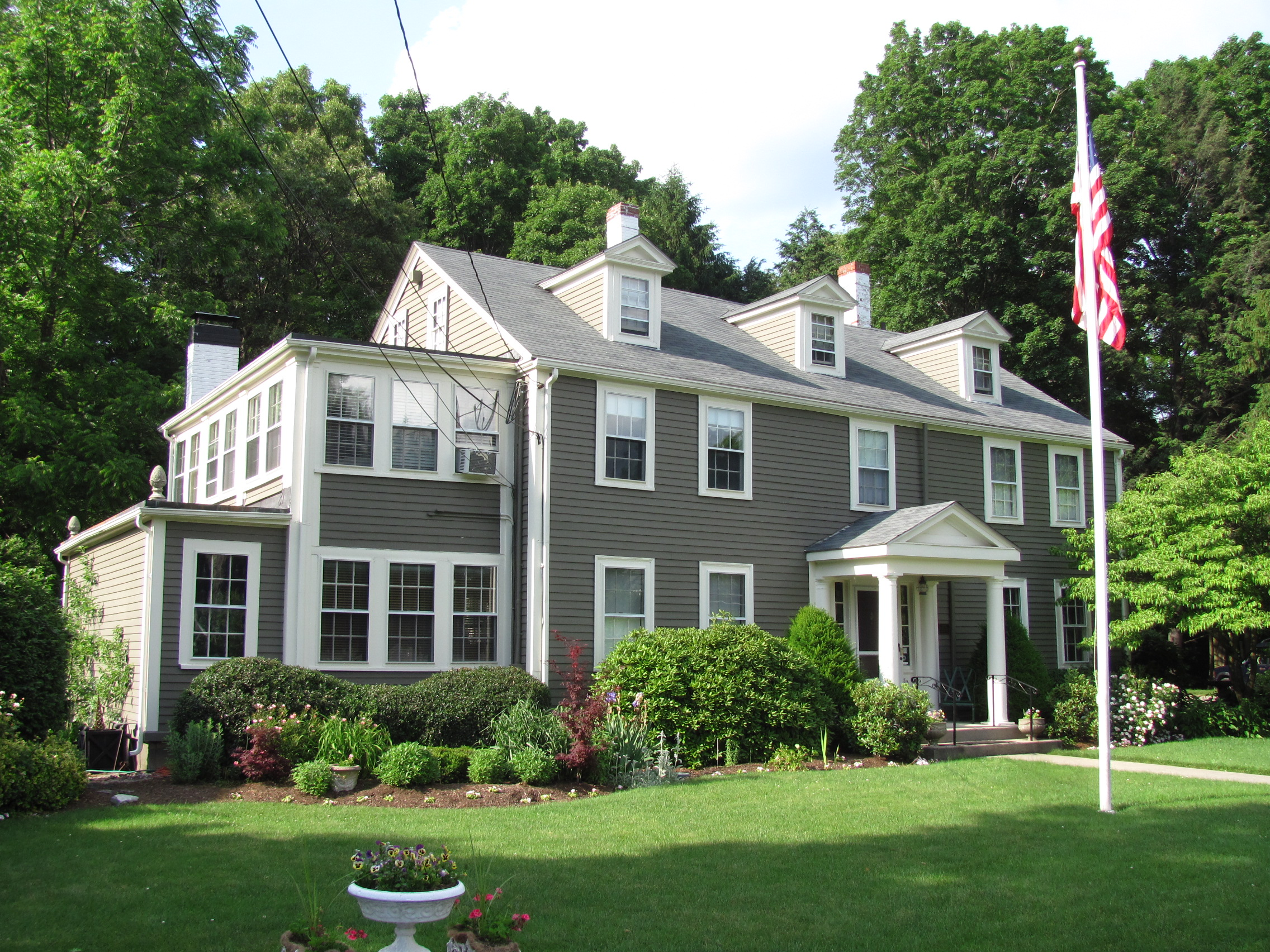
- Kingsbury-Whitaker House

- Location within Massachusetts Location within the United States
- Location: 53 Glendoon Street, Needham, Massachusetts
- Coordinates: 42°16′54″N 71°14′25″W
- Built: 1840
- Architectural style: Colonial, Federal
- NRHP reference No.: 90001080
- Added to NRHP: July 12, 1990

The Kingsbury-Whitaker House is a historic house in Needham, Massachusetts. The 2 1/2-story wood-frame house has at its core elements of a house that was built on the site in about 1720. The old house, built by Deacon Timothy Kingsbury, became the significantly-altered nucleus of a larger house built in 1840 by Edward Whitaker, a prominent local businessman. With further additions, the building encapsulates more than 200 years of construction methods. The house was listed on the National Register of Historic Places in 1990.

== Description and history ==
The Kingsbury-Whitaker House is located on the north side of Glendoon Street, just east of its junction with Nehoiden Street and a short way north of Great Plain Avenue (Massachusetts Route 135). The latter two roads are historically old roads, dating to the early period of the area's settlement. The house is a 2 1/2-story wood-frame structure, five bays wide, with a side-gable roof, twin interior chimneys, and a fieldstone foundation under its eastern half. Additions extend the building to the west, north, and northeast. Its main facade, facing south, is symmetrically arranged, with a center entrance flanked by sidelight windows and sheltered by a gabled porch.

Deacon Timothy Kingsbury purchased the land on which this house stands in 1702, and was one of the leaders of the effort to incorporate Needham, which succeeded in 1711. He is known to have built a house on his land c. 1710, and local historians typically ascribed that date to this house. However, a detailed analysis of the construction of its oldest portion, the eastern half, revealed it was built using methods that only came into use after about 1720. Kingsbury lived in the house until 1740, serving in a variety of town offices and in the colonial assembly.

The house remained in Kingsbury family hands until 1839, when it was sold to Edgar Whitaker, a Boston businessman. Whitaker made substantial alterations to the house, giving the main block its present appearance. His addition to the western end of the house required relocation of Nehoiden Street, which was moved 150 feet (46 m) west of its original route. Whitaker was, like Kingsbury, active in local politics, serving in the state legislature and on the Governor's Council. It was in part through his efforts that the railroad was routed through Needham. Subsequent owners of this house made numerous additions (including the removal of some to be replaced by others, but the main block was not substantially altered. As a result, the entire house, including its additions, represent a snapshot of more than 200 years of building methods.

== See also ==
- National Register of Historic Places listings in Norfolk County, Massachusetts
