= National Register of Historic Places listings in Norfolk County, Massachusetts =

This is a list of properties and historic districts listed on the National Register of Historic Places in Norfolk County, Massachusetts, other than those within the city of Quincy and the towns of Brookline and Milton. Norfolk County contains more than 300 listings, of which the more than 100 not in the above three communities are listed below. Some listings extend across municipal boundaries, and appear on more than one list.

The locations of National Register properties and districts (at least for all showing latitude and longitude coordinates below) may be seen in a map by clicking on "Map of all coordinates".

Contents: Counties in Massachusetts

Barnstable | Berkshire | Bristol | Dukes | Essex | Franklin | Hampden | Hampshire | Middlesex | Nantucket | Norfolk | Plymouth | Suffolk | Worcester

This National Park Service list is complete through NPS recent listings posted August 28, 2026.

== Cities and towns listed separately ==
Due to the number of listings in the county, some cities and towns have their sites listed separately.

Community	Image	First Date listed	Last Date listed	Count
Brookline		October 15, 1966	January 19, 2006	98
Milton		November 13, 1966	May 17, 2018	30
Quincy		November 13, 1966	December 5, 2008	110

== Current listings in other communities ==
	Name on the Register	Image	Date listed	Location	City or town	Description
1	John Adams School	John Adams School	December 5, 1985 (#85003068)	16 Church St. 42°13′47″N 70°56′46″W	Weymouth	
2	All Souls Church	All Souls Church	July 7, 2015 (#15000389)	196 Elm St. 42°13′23″N 71°00′02″W	Braintree	
3	Ames Schoolhouse	Ames Schoolhouse	March 31, 1983 (#83004284)	450 Washington St. 42°14′43″N 71°10′29″W	Dedham	
4	Angle Tree Stone	Angle Tree Stone	January 1, 1976 (#76000228)	West of North Attleborough off High St. 41°59′06″N 71°21′54″W	Plainville	
5	Jonathan Belcher House	Jonathan Belcher House	April 30, 1976 (#76000291)	360 N. Main St. 42°10′09″N 71°02′46″W	Randolph	
6	Blue Hills Reservation Parkways-Metropolitan Park System of Greater Boston	Blue Hills Reservation Parkways-Metropolitan Park System of Greater Boston	August 11, 2003 (#03000746)	Parts of Blue Hill Rd., Chickatawbut Rd., Hillside St., Uniquity Rd., Wampatuck Rd., and Green St. 42°13′34″N 71°04′20″W	Braintree and Canton	Extends into Milton and Quincy; part of the Metropolitan Park System of Greater Boston Multiple Property Submission (MPS)
7	Borderland Historic District	Borderland Historic District	June 16, 1997 (#97000497)	Massapoag Street; 42°04′02″N 71°09′24″W	Sharon	Coextensive with Borderland State Park, extending into Easton in Bristol County.
8	Seth Boyden House	Seth Boyden House	November 10, 1983 (#83004092)	135 Oak St. 42°04′22″N 71°13′05″W	Foxborough	
9	Brookwood Farm	Brookwood Farm	September 25, 1980 (#80000655)	Off Blue Hill River Rd. 42°12′34″N 71°06′41″W	Canton	Extends into Milton
10	Canton Corner Historic District	Canton Corner Historic District	September 9, 2009 (#09000697)	Roughly Washington St. from Pecunit St. to southwest of Dedham St., and Pleasant St. from Washington St. to Reservoir Rd. 42°10′26″N 71°08′10″W	Canton	
11	Canton Viaduct	Canton Viaduct	September 20, 1984 (#84002870)	At the intersection of Neponset St. and Walpole St. 42°09′32″N 71°09′14″W	Canton	Built in 1835
12	Ezra Carpenter House	Ezra Carpenter House	January 3, 1985 (#85000029)	168 South St. 42°03′07″N 71°15′17″W	Foxborough	
13	Otis Cary House	Otis Cary House	March 13, 1986 (#86000379)	242 South St. 42°02′42″N 71°15′36″W	Foxborough	
14	Benjamin Caryl House	Benjamin Caryl House	June 2, 2000 (#00000569)	107 Dedham St. 42°14′53″N 71°16′17″W	Dover	
15	Central Square Historic District	Central Square Historic District	February 13, 1992 (#92000040)	Roughly Broad St. from Middle to Putnam Sts. and Middle from Charles to Center Sts. 42°13′00″N 70°56′12″W	Weymouth	
16	Lucius Clapp Memorial	Lucius Clapp Memorial	August 18, 1992 (#92000998)	6 Park St. 42°07′27″N 71°06′05″W	Stoughton	
17	Cobb's Tavern	Cobb's Tavern	August 7, 1974 (#74000383)	41 Bay Rd. 42°08′14″N 71°08′58″W	Sharon	
18	Cohasset Central Cemetery	Cohasset Central Cemetery	December 27, 2002 (#02001612)	N. Main St. and Joy Place; 42°14′45″N 70°48′26″W	Cohasset	
19	Cohasset Common Historic District	Cohasset Common Historic District	February 28, 1996 (#96000058)	Bounded by Highland Ave., N. Main St., William B. Long, Jr., Rd. and Robert E. Jason Rd. 42°14′32″N 70°48′10″W	Cohasset	
20	Colburn School – High Street Historic District	Colburn School – High Street Historic District	June 9, 2000 (#00000641)	369–649, 390–680 High St. 42°13′48″N 71°13′17″W	Westwood	
21	Fred Holland Day House	Fred Holland Day House	April 18, 1977 (#77000191)	93 Day St. 42°11′35″N 71°12′13″W	Norwood	
22	Dean Junior College Historic District	Dean Junior College Historic District	April 23, 1975 (#75000285)	Dean College campus 42°05′07″N 71°23′56″W	Franklin	
23	Dedham Village Historic District	Dedham Village Historic District	September 6, 2006 (#06000785)	Roughly bounded by High, Court, Washington, and School Sts., Village Ave., and Chestnut St. 42°14′54″N 71°10′49″W	Dedham	
24	Dwight-Derby House	Dwight-Derby House	January 17, 2002 (#01001465)	7 Frairy St. 42°11′16″N 71°18′30″W	Medfield	
25	Eaton-Moulton Mill	Eaton-Moulton Mill	May 16, 1976 (#76000294)	35 Walnut St. 42°19′32″N 71°15′17″W	Wellesley	
26	Echo Bridge	Echo Bridge	April 9, 1980 (#80000638)	Spans the Charles River; 42°18′53″N 71°13′39″W	Needham	Extends into Newton in Middlesex County.
27	Ellice School	Ellice School	September 24, 2010 (#10000785)	185 Pleasant St. 42°08′44″N 71°21′29″W	Millis	
28	Elm Bank	Elm Bank	July 10, 1987 (#86003565)	Bounded by the carriage path to the south and by the Charles River to all other sides, off 900 Washington St. 42°16′34″N 71°18′09″W	Dover	
29	Elm Park and Isaac Sprague Memorial Tower	Elm Park and Isaac Sprague Memorial Tower	June 5, 2007 (#07000511)	305 Washington St. 42°18′42″N 71°16′31″W	Wellesley	
30	Endicott Estate	Endicott Estate	March 6, 2002 (#02000128)	656 East St. 42°14′29″N 71°09′48″W	Dedham	
31	Evergreen Cemetery	Evergreen Cemetery	August 4, 2021 (#100006778)	8 Evergreen St. 42°08′51″N 71°25′25″W	Medway	
32	Fairbanks House	Fairbanks House	October 15, 1966 (#66000367)	Eastern Ave. and East St. 42°14′35″N 71°10′05″W	Dedham	
33	Fairview Cemetery	Fairview Cemetery	September 16, 2009 (#09000717)	45 Fairview Ave., Boston; 42°14′45″N 71°08′18″W	Dedham	Mostly in Hyde Park, Boston.
34	D.W. Field Park	D.W. Field Park	November 24, 2000 (#00001341)	Between Pond St. in Avon and Pleasant St. in Brockton; 42°06′17″N 71°02′47″W	Avon	Extends into Brockton in Plymouth County
35	First Baptist Church of Medfield	First Baptist Church of Medfield	September 11, 2003 (#03000921)	438 Main St. 42°11′13″N 71°18′15″W	Medfield	
36	First Parish Unitarian Church	First Parish Unitarian Church	April 18, 1974 (#74000376)	North St. 42°11′14″N 71°18′25″W	Medfield	
37	Fisher School-High Street Historic District	Fisher School-High Street Historic District	June 30, 2000 (#00000687)	748-850 and 751-823 High St. 42°13′24″N 71°13′25″W	Westwood	
38	Fogg Building	Fogg Building	March 10, 1983 (#83000594)	100-110 Pleasant St. and 6-10 Columbian St. 42°10′28″N 70°57′07″W	Weymouth	
39	Fogg Library	Fogg Library	June 11, 1981 (#81000113)	1 Columbian St. 42°10′28″N 70°57′04″W	Weymouth	
40	Foxboro Grange Hall	Foxboro Grange Hall	April 21, 1983 (#83000595)	11-15 Bird St. 42°03′56″N 71°15′02″W	Foxborough	
41	Foxborough Pumping Station	Foxborough Pumping Station	December 6, 2005 (#05001362)	25 Pumping Station Rd. 42°04′40″N 71°14′18″W	Foxborough	
42	Foxborough State Hospital	Foxborough State Hospital	July 19, 1994 (#94000695)	Junction of Chestnut and Main Sts. 42°04′41″N 71°15′30″W	Foxborough	part of the Massachusetts State Hospitals And State Schools MPS
43	Franklin Common Historic District	Franklin Common Historic District	March 31, 2005 (#05000218)	Main, High, Union, and Pleasant Sts. and Church Sq. 42°05′19″N 71°24′05″W	Franklin	
44	Front Street Historic District	Front Street Historic District	January 10, 2011 (#10001121)	Roughly bounded by Front, Summer, Kingman, Congress, and Washington Sts. 42°12′39″N 70°57′43″W	Weymouth	
45	Fuller Brook Park	Fuller Brook Park	May 29, 2013 (#11000307)	Dover Rd. to Maugus Ave. 42°18′39″N 71°16′26″W	Wellesley	Linear park following Fuller Brook
46	Amos Fuller House	Amos Fuller House	March 31, 1983 (#83000596)	220 Nehoiden St. 42°17′07″N 71°14′31″W	Needham	
47	Robert Fuller House	Robert Fuller House	September 8, 1987 (#87001476)	3 Burrill Ln. 42°17′37″N 71°15′27″W	Needham	
48	Gills Farm Archeological District		October 24, 1983 (#83004093)	Address Restricted	Randolph	A Middle Archaic prehistoric site.
49	Government Island Historic District	Government Island Historic District	May 12, 1994 (#94000424)	Border St. 42°14′17″N 70°47′21″W	Cohasset	Former site of the mainland station of the Minot's Ledge Light, now a city-owned wharf and park.
50	Green Hill Site	Green Hill Site	September 25, 1980 (#80000651)	near the Neponset River	Canton	A sizable prehistoric site encompassing Middle and Late Archaic remains. Part of the Blue Hills and Neponset River Reservations Multiple Resource Area (MRA).
51	Emery Grover Building	Emery Grover Building	August 20, 1987 (#87001393)	1330 Highland Ave. 42°16′59″N 71°14′10″W	Needham	
52	Josephine M. Hagerty House	Josephine M. Hagerty House	June 4, 1997 (#97000529)	357 Atlantic Ave. 42°15′31″N 70°48′09″W	Cohasset	
53	Holbrook Square Historic District	Holbrook Square Historic District	May 10, 2006 (#06000359)	Roughly N. Franklin St. from Union St. to Linfield St. 42°09′20″N 71°00′35″W	Holbrook	
54	Hunnewell Estates Historic District	Hunnewell Estates Historic District	April 14, 1988 (#88000438)	Washington St. and Pond Rd. 42°16′59″N 71°18′40″W	Wellesley	H. H. Hunnewell, H. H. Hunnewell Estate
55	Inness-Fitts House and Studio/Barn	Inness-Fitts House and Studio/Barn	March 15, 2002 (#02000153)	406 Main St. 42°11′16″N 71°18′07″W	Medfield	
56	Intermediate Building	Intermediate Building	August 27, 1981 (#81000112)	324 Washington St. 42°18′38″N 71°16′30″W	Wellesley Hills	
57	Jefferson School	Jefferson School	May 12, 1981 (#81000114)	200 Middle St. 42°13′00″N 70°56′15″W	Weymouth	
58	George E. Keith Company Factory No. 8		February 3, 2025 (#100011425)	44 Wharf Street; 42°13′15″N 70°55′30″W	Weymouth	
59	Kingsbury-Whitaker House	Kingsbury-Whitaker House	July 12, 1990 (#90001080)	53 Glendoon St. 42°16′54″N 71°14′25″W	Needham	
60	Deacon Willard Lewis House	Deacon Willard Lewis House	October 29, 1975 (#75000297)	33 West St. 42°08′42″N 71°15′19″W	Walpole	
61	Joshua Lewis House	Joshua Lewis House	April 1, 1982 (#82002749)	178 South St. 42°16′08″N 71°12′49″W	Needham	
62	Caleb Lothrop House	Caleb Lothrop House	May 3, 1976 (#76000269)	14 Summer St. 42°14′12″N 70°47′49″W	Cohasset	
63	McIntosh Corner Historic District	McIntosh Corner Historic District	January 5, 1989 (#88003127)	Roughly Great Plain and Central Aves. 42°16′52″N 71°15′17″W	Needham	
64	Medfield State Hospital	Medfield State Hospital	January 21, 1994 (#93001481)	45 Hospital Rd. 42°12′48″N 71°20′10″W	Medfield	part of the Massachusetts State Hospitals And State Schools MPS
65	Medway Village Historic District	Medway Village Historic District	December 17, 2008 (#08001191)	Bounded by former New York and Boston railroad right-of-way, Oakland St., and the Charles River; 42°08′30″N 71°23′48″W	Medway	
66	Memorial Hall	Memorial Hall	April 21, 1983 (#83000597)	22 South St. 42°03′50″N 71°15′02″W	Foxborough	
67	Millis Center Historic District	Millis Center Historic District	September 14, 2007 (#07000944)	Curve, Daniels, Exchange, Irving, Lavender, Main, and Union Sts. 42°10′03″N 71°21′36″W	Millis	
68	Davis Mills House	Davis Mills House	April 1, 1982 (#82004418)	945 Central Ave. 42°17′17″N 71°15′07″W	Needham	
69	Amos Morse House	Amos Morse House	January 9, 1986 (#86000027)	77 North St. 42°05′04″N 71°15′29″W	Foxborough	The house was demolished on December 20, 2019.
70	Mother Brook Lower Mill Pond Historic District		September 16, 2025 (#100011841)	13 Berry Ln; 171, 185, 202 Bussey St; 222, 235, 243-245, 251 Colburn St; 297, 303-307, 315-317/319 High St; Maverick St Dam, Colburn St east of Bussey St, Bussey St between Colburn Str & Aiello Dr; Maverick St between Colburn and High Sts; 42°14′55″N 71°09′37″W	Dedham	
71	Needham Street Bridge	Needham Street Bridge	September 4, 1986 (#86001852)	Needham St. at the Charles River; 42°18′23″N 71°13′03″W	Needham	Extends into Newton in Middlesex County; part of the Newton MRA
72	Needham Town Hall Historic District	Needham Town Hall Historic District	November 15, 1990 (#90001756)	Great Plain Ave. between Highland Ave. and Chapel St. 42°17′20″N 71°14′26″W	Needham	
73	Norfolk County Courthouse	Norfolk County Courthouse	November 28, 1972 (#72001312)	650 High St. 42°14′55″N 71°10′36″W	Dedham	
74	Norfolk Grange Hall	Norfolk Grange Hall	May 25, 1989 (#89000438)	28 Rockwood Rd. 42°07′20″N 71°19′58″W	Norfolk	
75	North Bellingham Cemetery and Oak Hill Cemetery	North Bellingham Cemetery and Oak Hill Cemetery	September 25, 2012 (#12000819)	Hartford Ave. 42°07′01″N 71°27′34″W	Bellingham	
76	Norwood Memorial Municipal Building	Norwood Memorial Municipal Building	October 10, 1996 (#96001086)	566 Washington St. 42°11′41″N 71°12′02″W	Norwood	
77	Oak Grove Farm	Oak Grove Farm	May 4, 2011 (#11000247)	410 Exchange St. 42°10′52″N 71°21′46″W	Millis	
78	Old Barn	Old Barn	September 25, 1980 (#80000660)	Off Blue Hill River Road; 42°12′25″N 71°06′40″W	Canton	
79	Old South Union Church	Old South Union Church	April 1, 1982 (#82004422)	25 Columbian St. 42°10′30″N 70°57′06″W	Weymouth	
80	Original Congregational Church of Wrentham	Original Congregational Church of Wrentham	September 22, 2014 (#14000694)	1 East & 22 Dedham Sts. 42°04′01″N 71°19′39″W	Wrentham	
81	John Partridge House	John Partridge House	October 15, 1974 (#74000377)	315 Exchange St. 42°10′34″N 71°21′38″W	Millis	
82	Peak House	Peak House	September 5, 1975 (#75000288)	347 Main St. 42°11′23″N 71°17′50″W	Medfield	
83	Plimpton-Winter House	Plimpton-Winter House	December 5, 1985 (#85003071)	127 South St. 42°03′53″N 71°19′50″W	Wrentham	
84	Pond Street School	Pond Street School	February 12, 2010 (#10000004)	235 Pond St. 42°09′45″N 70°57′36″W	Weymouth	Also known as the Fulton School, this property has been converted to condominiums.
85	Pondville Cemetery	Pondville Cemetery	April 15, 2014 (#14000158)	Everett Street; 42°05′06″N 71°17′42″W	Norfolk	
86	Ponkapoag Camp of Appalachian Mountain Club	Ponkapoag Camp of Appalachian Mountain Club	September 25, 1980 (#80000657)	Randolph; 42°11′35″N 71°05′14″W	Randolph	part of the Blue Hills and Neponset River Reservations MRA
87	Pratt Historic Building	Pratt Historic Building	September 7, 2006 (#06000816)	106 S. Main St. 42°14′19″N 70°47′59″W	Cohasset	
88	Capt. Josiah Pratt House	Capt. Josiah Pratt House	April 21, 1983 (#83000598)	141 East St. 42°03′48″N 71°12′03″W	Foxborough	
89	Prospect Hill Cemetery	Prospect Hill Cemetery	March 15, 2006 (#06000129)	Auburn Rd. 42°09′59″N 71°22′04″W	Millis	
90	Rabbit Hill Historic District	Rabbit Hill Historic District	April 1, 1988 (#88000224)	Roughly bounded by Highland, Main, Franklin, and Milford Sts. 42°08′39″N 71°26′02″W	Medway	
91	Red Brick School	Red Brick School	January 1, 1976 (#76000276)	2 Lincoln St. 42°05′34″N 71°24′00″W	Franklin	
92	Redman Farm House	Redman Farm House	September 25, 1980 (#80000664)	2173 Washington St. 42°11′30″N 71°07′03″W	Canton	Incorrectly listed at the corner of Washington St. and Homans La. Part of the Blue Hills and Neponset River Reservations MRA.
93	Roberts School	Roberts School	August 30, 2007 (#07000860)	320 Union St. 42°09′18″N 71°01′25″W	Holbrook	
94	Rockwood Road Historic District	Rockwood Road Historic District	April 10, 2017 (#100000850)	Roughly Rockwood Rd. from MBTA tracks to Boardman St. 42°07′20″N 71°19′37″W	Norfolk	
95	Roebuck Tavern	Roebuck Tavern	May 17, 1984 (#84002878)	21 Dedham St. 42°04′03″N 71°19′41″W	Wrentham	
96	Sea Street Historic District	Sea Street Historic District	August 19, 2009 (#09000646)	Roughly bounded by Bridge, North, and Neck Sts., Crescent Rd., and Pearl and the rear of Standish Sts. 42°14′35″N 70°56′54″W	Weymouth	
97	Sharon Historic District	Sharon Historic District	August 22, 1975 (#75000296)	Both sides of N. Main St. from Post Office Sq. to School St. 42°07′28″N 71°10′45″W	Sharon	
98	James Smith House	James Smith House	August 21, 1986 (#86001845)	706 Great Plain Ave. 42°16′49″N 71°13′36″W	Needham	
99	Stetson Hall	Stetson Hall	December 7, 2011 (#11000883)	6 S. Main St. 42°09′45″N 71°02′29″W	Randolph	
100	Stoneholm	Stoneholm	April 2, 1980 (#80000648)	188 Ames St. 42°06′55″N 71°09′57″W	Sharon	
101	Stony Brook Reservation Parkways, Metropolitan Park System of Great Boston MPS	Stony Brook Reservation Parkways, Metropolitan Park System of Great Boston MPS	January 3, 2006 (#05001509)	Dedham, Enneking, Turtle Pond Parkways, Smith Field, Reservation, W. Border Rds. 42°15′28″N 71°08′32″W	Dedham	Extends into Boston in Suffolk County
102	Stoughton Railroad Station	Stoughton Railroad Station	January 21, 1974 (#74000384)	53 Wyman St. 42°07′27″N 71°05′58″W	Stoughton	
103	Stoughtonham Furnace Site	Stoughtonham Furnace Site	August 16, 1984 (#84002881)	Address Restricted; 42°04′56″N 71°12′44″W	Sharon, Foxborough	Site of a Revolutionary War-era foundry
104	Sudbury Aqueduct Linear District	Sudbury Aqueduct Linear District	January 18, 1990 (#89002293)	Along the Sudbury Aqueduct from Farm Pond at Waverly St. (Framingham) to Chestnut Hill Reservoir (Newton); 42°17′33″N 71°18′44″W	Wellesley, Needham	Extends into Middlesex County. Part of the Water Supply System of Metropolitan Boston MPS.
105	Sullivan's Corner Historic District	Sullivan's Corner Historic District	June 15, 2012 (#12000340)	Roughly the junction of Main, Needham, & Seekonk Sts. 42°07′14″N 71°18′39″W	Norfolk	
106	Thayer Public Library	Thayer Public Library	July 21, 1978 (#78000446)	2 John F. Kennedy Memorial Dr. 42°12′24″N 71°00′18″W	Braintree	Current library built in 1999.
107	Gen. Sylvanus Thayer House	Gen. Sylvanus Thayer House	December 3, 1974 (#74000372)	786 Washington St. 42°12′22″N 71°00′17″W	Braintree	
108	Tolman-Gay House	Tolman-Gay House	June 1, 1982 (#82004419)	1196 Central Ave. 42°16′48″N 71°15′03″W	Needham	
109	Townsend House	Townsend House	April 1, 1982 (#82004420)	980 Central Ave. 42°17′28″N 71°14′58″W	Needham	
110	Stephen Turner House	Stephen Turner House	May 10, 1979 (#79002682)	North of Norfolk at 187 Seekonk St. 42°08′45″N 71°18′32″W	Norfolk	
111	Union Station	Union Station	April 5, 2016 (#16000139)	West St. 42°08′43″N 71°15′29″W	Walpole	
112	US Post Office-Weymouth Landing	US Post Office-Weymouth Landing	May 27, 1986 (#86001186)	103 Washington St. 42°13′05″N 70°58′02″W	Weymouth	
113	Vine Lake Cemetery	Vine Lake Cemetery	April 14, 2005 (#05000277)	Main St. 42°11′10″N 71°18′56″W	Medfield	
114	Walpole Town Hall	Walpole Town Hall	October 8, 1981 (#81000619)	Main St. 42°08′45″N 71°15′12″W	Walpole	
115	Warelands	Warelands	November 10, 1977 (#77000190)	North of Norfolk at 103 Boardman St. 42°07′51″N 71°19′02″W	Norfolk	
116	Washington School	Washington School	June 5, 1986 (#86001218)	8 School St. 42°12′53″N 70°55′19″W	Weymouth	
117	Wellesley Congregational Church and Cemetery	Wellesley Congregational Church and Cemetery	September 22, 2014 (#14000696)	2 Central St. 42°17′46″N 71°17′37″W	Wellesley	
118	Wellesley Farms Railroad Station	Wellesley Farms Railroad Station	February 14, 1986 (#86000259)	Croton St. extension 42°19′23″N 71°16′21″W	Wellesley	
119	Wellesley Hills Branch Library	Wellesley Hills Branch Library	June 12, 2007 (#07000546)	210 Washington St. 42°18′53″N 71°16′17″W	Wellesley	
120	Wellesley Town Hall	Wellesley Town Hall	April 30, 1976 (#76000295)	525 Washington St. 42°17′52″N 71°17′32″W	Wellesley	
121	Weymouth Civic District	Weymouth Civic District	March 27, 1992 (#92000146)	75 Middle St. 42°13′15″N 70°56′23″W	Weymouth	
122	Weymouth Meeting House Historic District	Weymouth Meeting House Historic District	December 13, 2010 (#10001007)	Church, East, Green, North, and Norton Sts. 42°13′48″N 70°56′38″W	Weymouth	
123	Israel Whitney House	Israel Whitney House	February 25, 1988 (#88000160)	963 Central Ave. 42°17′16″N 71°15′08″W	Needham	
124	Charles R. Wilber School	Charles R. Wilber School	May 10, 2010 (#10000244)	75-85 S Main St. 42°07′17″N 71°10′51″W	Sharon	
125	Capt. John Wilson House and Bates Ship Chandlery	Capt. John Wilson House and Bates Ship Chandlery	December 27, 2002 (#02001614)	4 Elm St. 42°14′27″N 70°48′06″W	Cohasset	
126	Wrentham State School	Wrentham State School	January 21, 1994 (#93001490)	Junction of Emerald and North Sts. 42°04′58″N 71°19′08″W	Wrentham	part of the Massachusetts State Hospitals And State Schools MPS

== Former listings ==
	Name on the Register	Image	Date listed	Date removed	Location	City or town	Description
1	Josiah Ware Tavern		June 19, 1979 (#79000365)	June 2, 1981	Main St. and Rockwood Rd.	Norfolk	
