= Seth Boyden House =

Historic house in Massachusetts, United States

- U.S. National Register of Historic Places
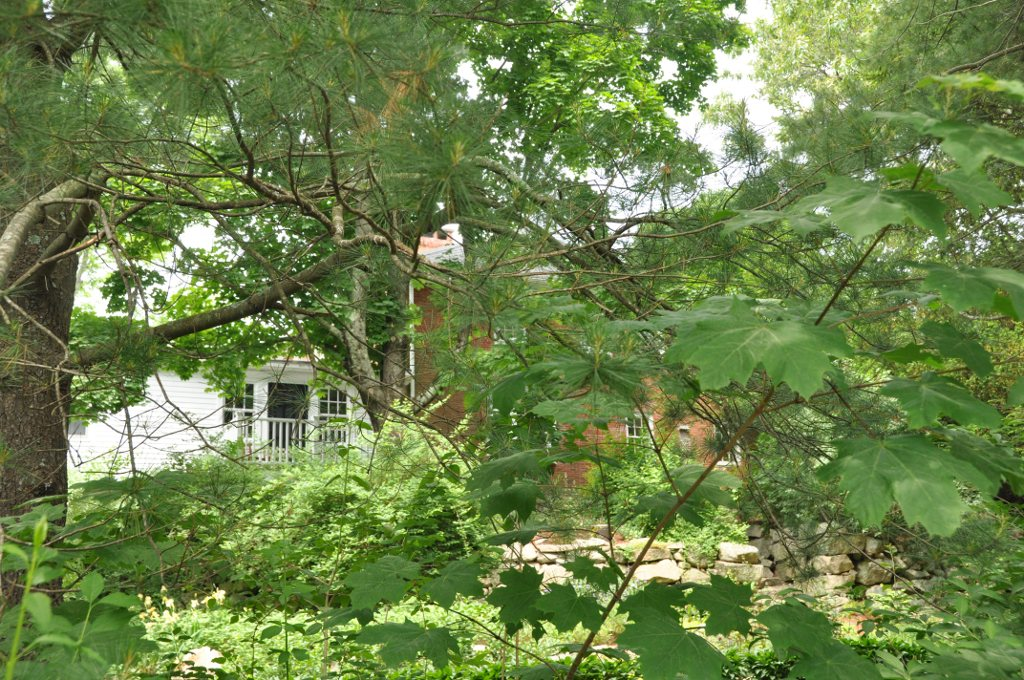

- Location within Massachusetts Location within the United States
- Location: Foxborough, Massachusetts
- Coordinates: 42°4′22″N 71°13′5″W
- Built: Circa 1737 with an addition added in 1820
- Architectural style: Federal
- NRHP reference No.: 83004092
- Added to NRHP: November 10, 1983

The Seth Boyden House is a historic house at 135 Oak Street in Foxborough, Massachusetts. It is also known as "OAKWUD", after 500-year-old oak tree that stands on the northeast side of the main house. The two story brick house is claimed to have been built as early as 1728, although stylistic architectural evidence suggests a later (c. 1780–90) date. The house is notable as the home of inventor Seth Boyden, who was cited as a significant influence by Thomas Alva Edison.

The house was listed on the National Register of Historic Places in 1983.

== See also ==
- National Register of Historic Places listings in Norfolk County, Massachusetts
