= Eaton-Moulton Mill =

- U.S. National Register of Historic Places
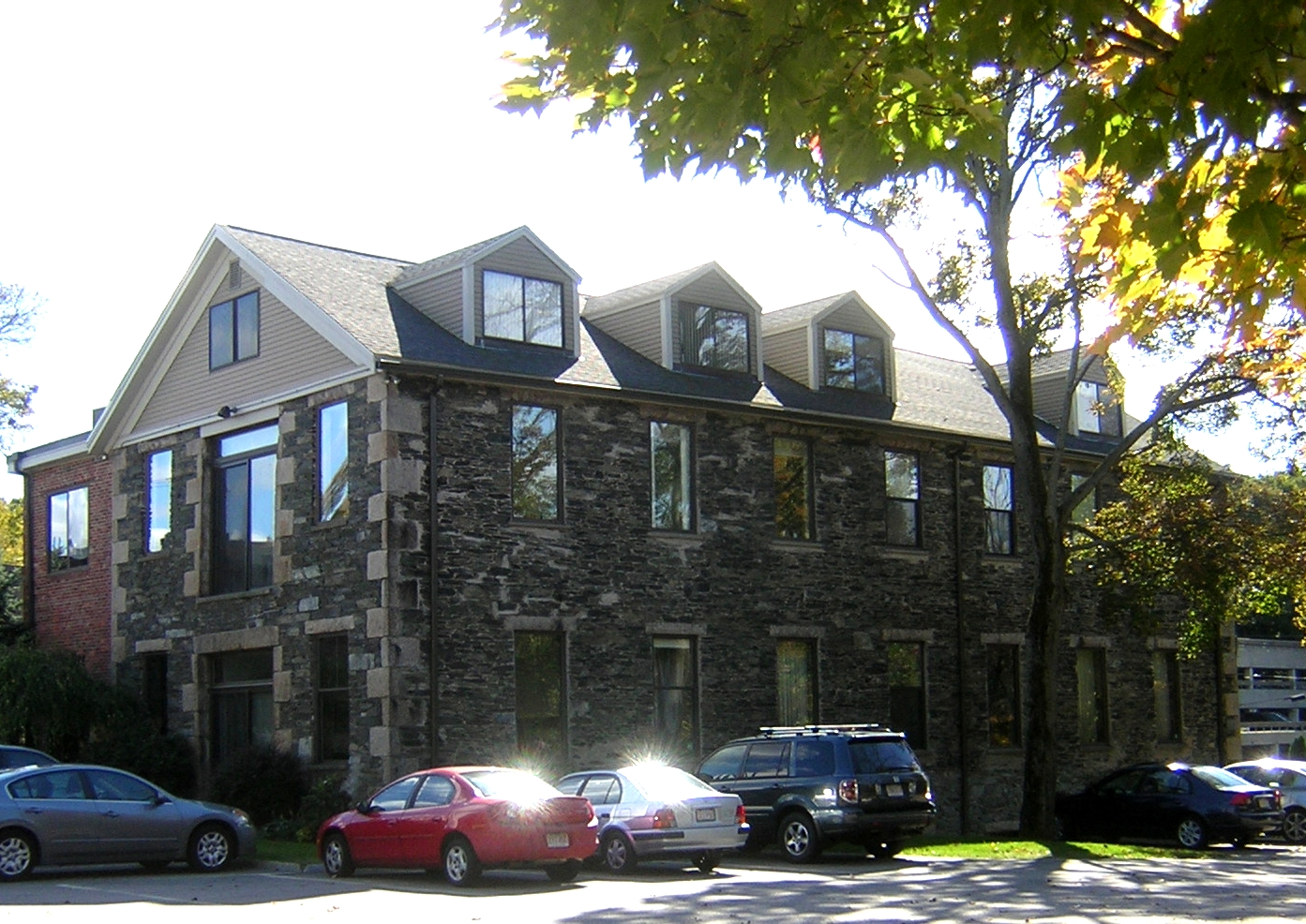

- Location within Massachusetts Location within the United States
- Location: Wellesley, Massachusetts
- Coordinates: 42°19′32″N 71°15′14″W
- Built: 1853
- NRHP reference No.: 76000294
- Added to NRHP: May 16, 1976

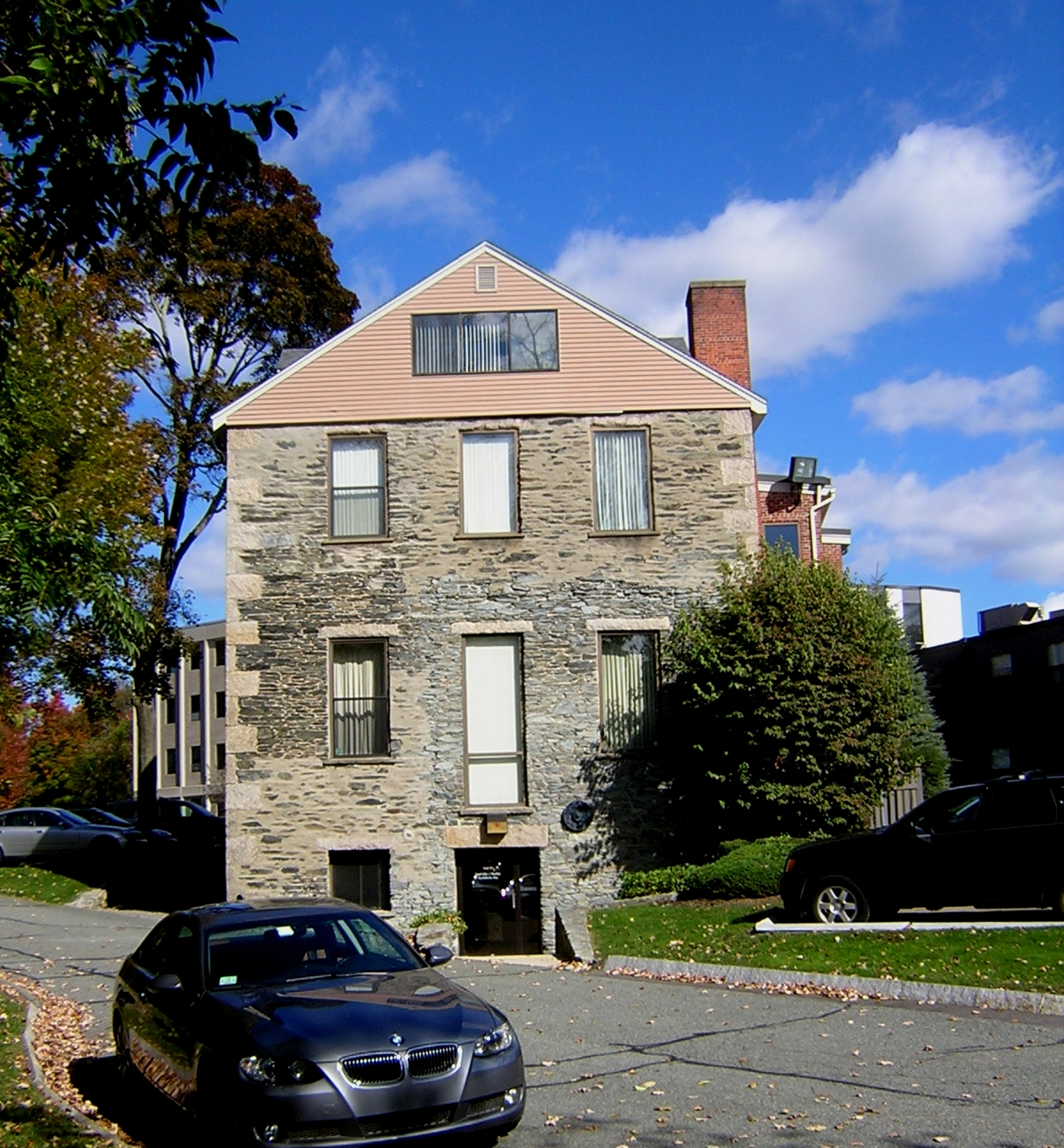

The Eaton-Moulton Mill is a historic industrial building at 37 Walnut Street in the Wellesley Lower Falls village of Wellesley, Massachusetts. The 2 1/2-story granite mill building was built c. 1853 by the firm of Reuben Ware and William Clark, manufacturers of papermaking machinery. The building is distinctive for its use of stone, a relatively uncommon construction material in this area. The Lower Falls area of Wellesley and Newton developed as a papermaking center in the 18th century, and began transitioning from handmade methods to machine methods producing rolls of paper in the 1830s. Ware and Clark were at the forefront of this transition, establishing a machine shop in 1832 where the manufactured equipment for this new process. This building was built for them in 1853, and continued under Eaton and Moulton and other owners until papermaking declined. The building now houses commercial office space.

The building was listed on the National Register of Historic Places in 1976.

== See also ==
- National Register of Historic Places listings in Norfolk County, Massachusetts
