= Townsend House (Needham, Massachusetts) =

- U.S. National Register of Historic Places
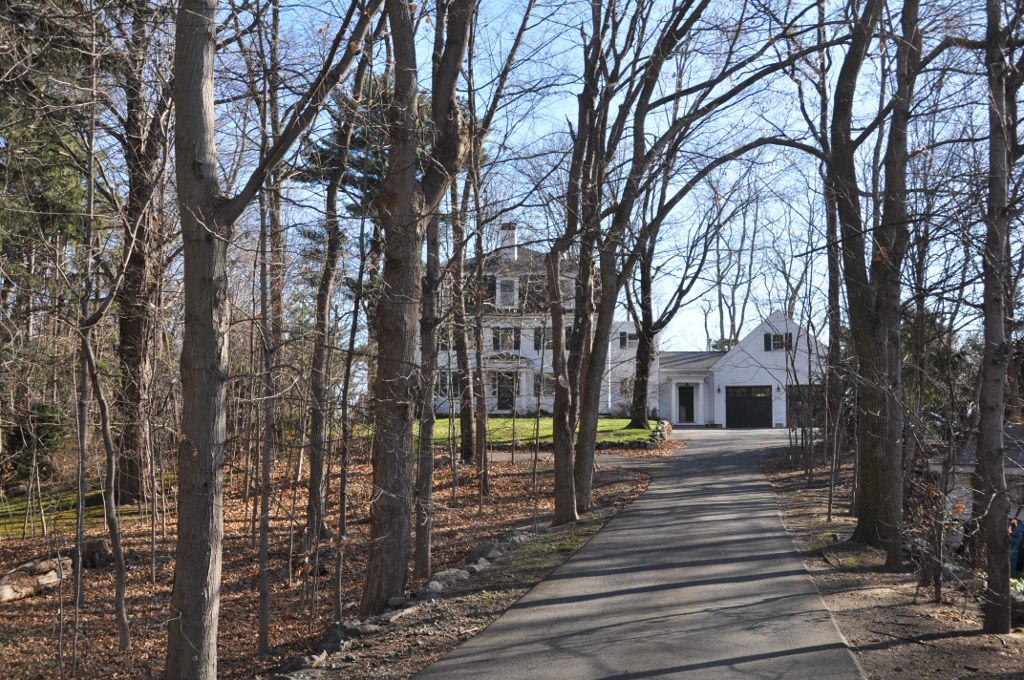

- Location within Massachusetts Location within the United States
- Location: 980 Central Ave., Needham, Massachusetts
- Coordinates: 42°17′28″N 71°14′58″W
- Area: 1.1 acres (0.45 ha)
- Built: 1720
- Built by: Gregory Sugars
- NRHP reference No.: 82004420
- Added to NRHP: April 1, 1982

The Townsend House is a historic late First Period house in Needham, Massachusetts, United States. The 2 1/2-story wood-frame house was built in 1720 by Gregory Sugars, a sea captain, for his son-in-law, Rev. Jonathan Townsend. The building has retained little external appearance as an early 18th century house, showing the adaptive reuse and restyling of older houses. It was given a Federal appearance in the 1780s by its second owner, Rev. Samuel West, and was, under his ownership, used as a muster site for the local militia prior to the 1775 Battles of Lexington and Concord. The building has been much modified over the years (including the addition of a mansard-like roof), but many of its older interior rooms have retained features from the 18th century.

The house was listed on the National Register of Historic Places in 1982.

== See also ==
- National Register of Historic Places listings in Norfolk County, Massachusetts
