= Pond Street School =

- U.S. National Register of Historic Places
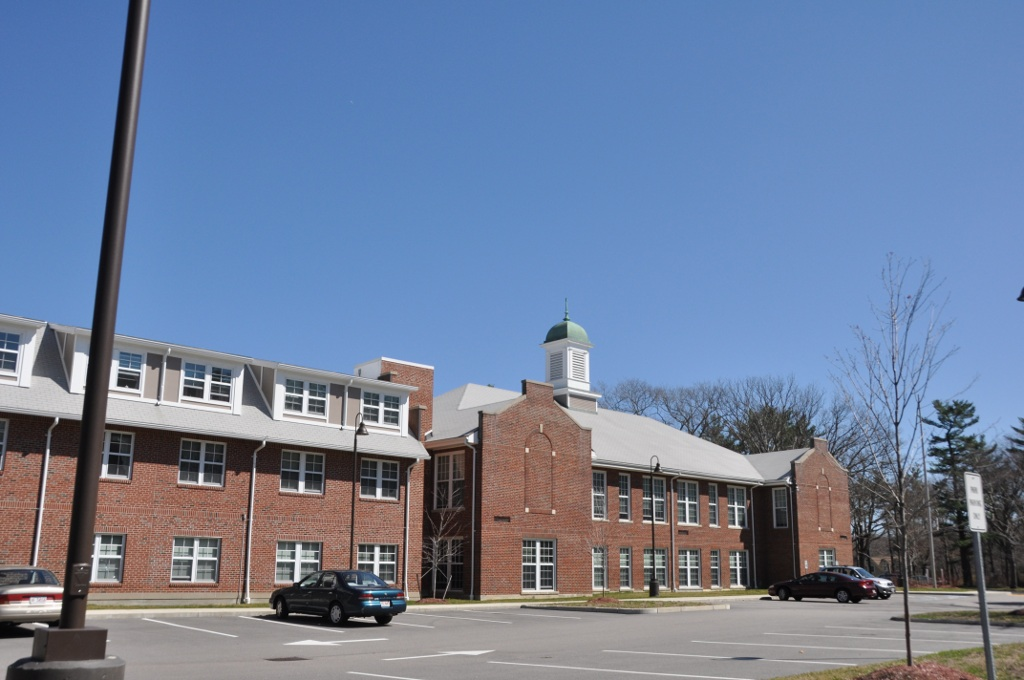

- Location within Massachusetts Location within the United States
- Location: 235 Pond St., Weymouth, Massachusetts
- Coordinates: 42°9′53″N 70°57′43″W
- Area: 3.8 acres (1.5 ha)
- Architect: Prescott, Howard B.S.; et al.
- Architectural style: Colonial Revival
- NRHP reference No.: 10000004
- Added to NRHP: February 12, 2010

The Pond Street School, also known as the Alice E. Fulton School, is a historic former school building at 235 Pond Street in Weymouth, Massachusetts. The Colonial Revival brick building was constructed in 1928 to a design by architect Howard B. S. Prescott. Originally built in an H shape, the building was extended in 1953 and 1958 to the northeast, and in 1967 with the addition of a gymnasium section to the west. The latter portion was demolished and replaced by a new wing in 2008 during the conversion of the building to a senior living facility. The building served as an elementary school until 1991; it was renamed Alice E. Fulton School, after its first principal, in 1964.

The building was listed on the National Register of Historic Places in 2010.

== See also ==
- National Register of Historic Places listings in Norfolk County, Massachusetts
