= Emery Grover Building =

- U.S. National Register of Historic Places
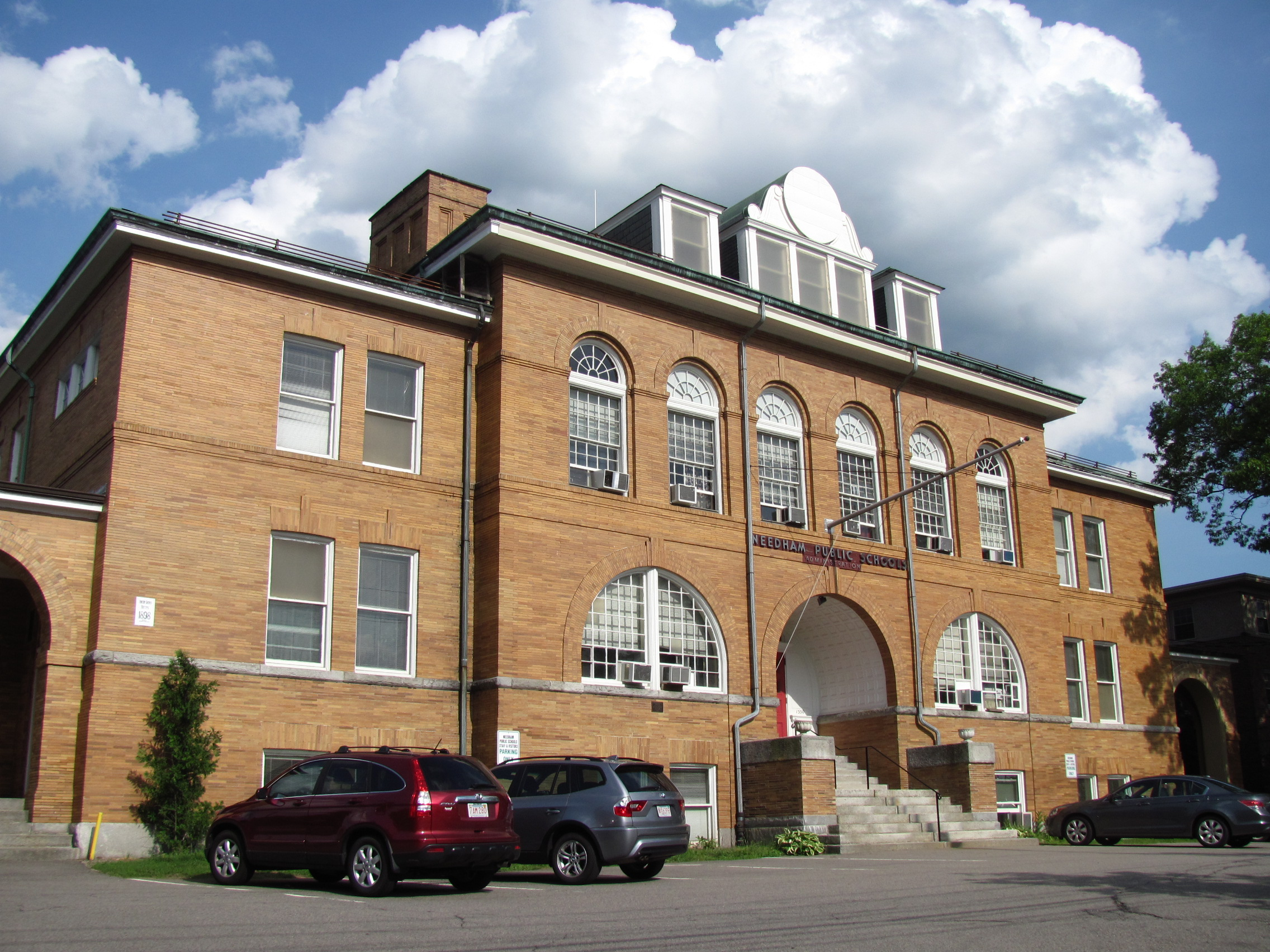
- Emery Grover Building

- Location within Massachusetts Location within the United States
- Location: 1330 Highland Avenue, Needham, Massachusetts
- Coordinates: 42°16′59″N 71°14′10″W
- Built: 1898
- Architect: Whitman & Hood
- Architectural style: Renaissance
- NRHP reference No.: 87001393
- Added to NRHP: August 20, 1987

The Emery Grover Building is a historic structure in downtown Needham, Massachusetts. It currently houses administration offices for the Needham Public Schools, including the office of Daniel E. Gutekanst, Superintendent of Schools.

Built in 1898 in the Italian Renaissance Revival architectural style from a design by Whitman & Hood, the symmetrical tan brick building features an upper arcade of six Georgian Revival windows, an arched center entrance stoop flanked by multi-paned Diocletian windows, arched wings, and a curved pediment dormer crown sporting the Needham Public Schools seal.

The Emery Grover Building was listed on the National Register of Historic Places in 1987.

In 2010, the Boston architectural firm of Bargmann Hendrie + Archetype Inc. conducted a feasibility study for the building's restoration and renovation as a downtown senior center. The firm estimated the rehabilitation cost at $8.6 million, $2.5 million of which could come from the Community Preservation Act.

== See also ==
- National Register of Historic Places listings in Norfolk County, Massachusetts
