= Amos Fuller House =

Historic house in Massachusetts, United States

- U.S. National Register of Historic Places
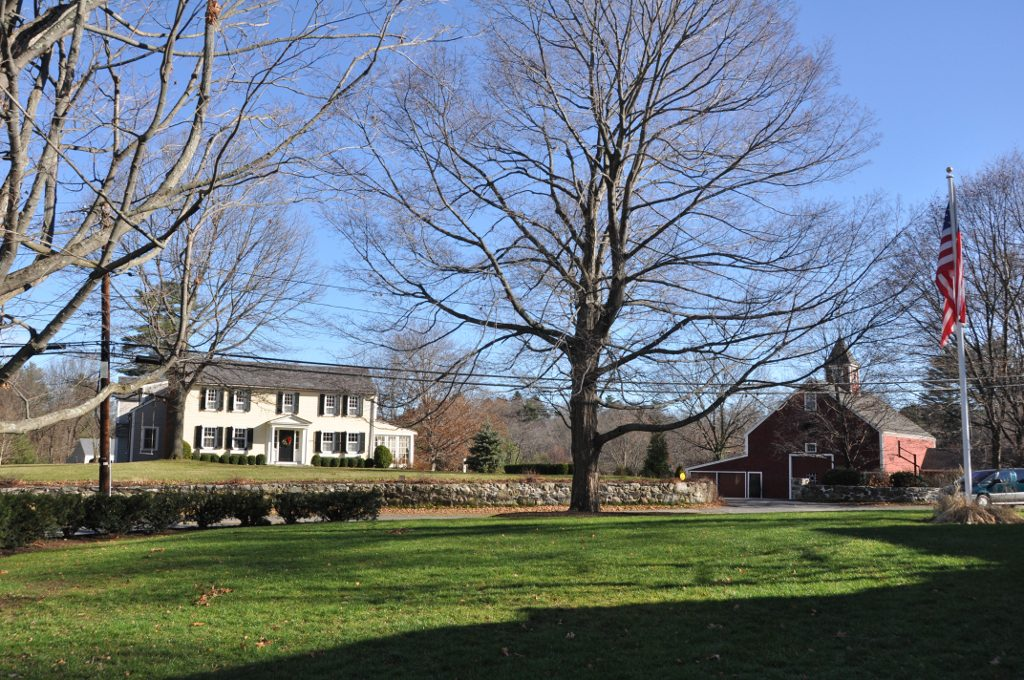

- Location within Massachusetts Location within the United States
- Location: 220 Nehoiden Street, Needham, Massachusetts
- Coordinates: 42°17′7″N 71°14′31″W
- Area: 3.2 acres (1.3 ha)
- Built: 1754
- NRHP reference No.: 83000596
- Added to NRHP: March 31, 1983

The Amos Fuller House is a historic house located at 220 Nehoiden Street in Needham, Massachusetts. Built in 1754, possibly using parts of an older house, it is one of the town's older surviving structures, made further notable by several of its inhabitants. It was listed on the National Register of Historic Places on March 31, 1983.

== Description and history ==
The Amos Fuller House stands in what is now a residential area of central Needham, on the northeast side of Nehoiden Street nearly opposite its junction with Newell Avenue. It is set well back from the road on a parcel over 3 acres (1.2 ha) in size, with a 19th-century barn to one side. The house is a 2 1/2-story wood-frame structure, with a side-gable roof. An ell extends to the rear, and an enclosed porch extends to the side. The rear right side of the house includes a "Beverly jog", or projecting section that extends part of the rear roof line. The house originally had a central chimney, which was removed in the late 19th century.

The house was built in 1754 by Amos Fuller, the son of Thomas Fuller, one of Needham's first settlers. It was built on the site of the elder Fuller's house, and may include timbers from an older building. Amos Fuller served the town as a selectman and in the state legislature. His son Reuben sold the house in 1830 to Rev. William Ritchie, who oversaw a modernization of its interior; the barn also appears to date from this period. Artemas Newell (for whose family Newell Avenue is named) purchased the property in 1852; he was a prominent local attorney. Augustus Newell, who owned the property in the late 19th century, was among the first in the region to manufacture concrete blocks.

== See also ==
- National Register of Historic Places listings in Norfolk County, Massachusetts
