= Davis Mills House =

Historic house in Massachusetts, United States

- U.S. National Register of Historic Places
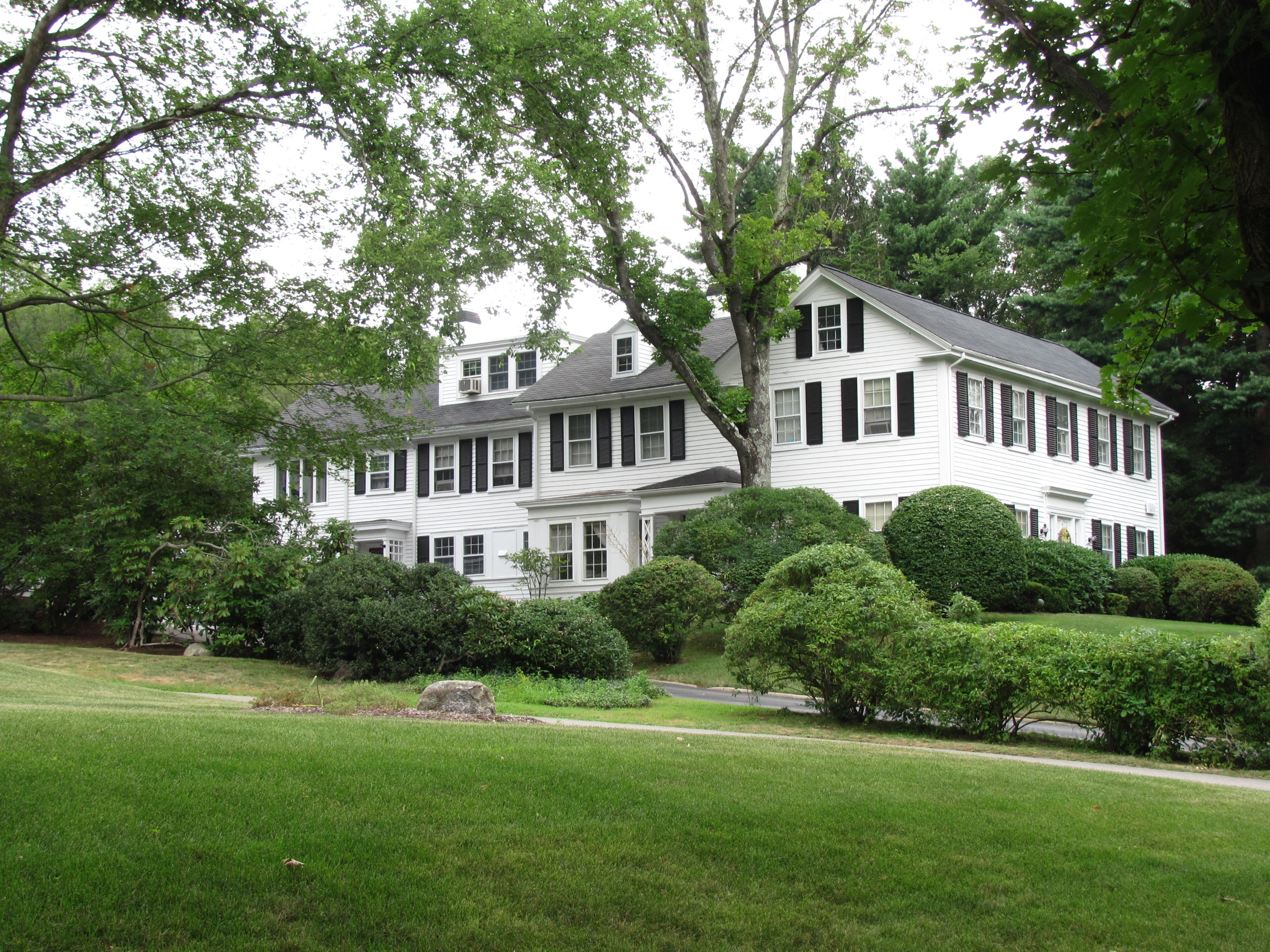
- Davis Mills House

- Location within Massachusetts Location within the United States
- Location: 945 Central Avenue, Needham, Massachusetts
- Coordinates: 42°17′17″N 71°15′7″W
- Built: 1834
- Architectural style: Greek Revival
- NRHP reference No.: 82004418
- Added to NRHP: April 1, 1982

The Davis Mills House is a historic house in Needham, Massachusetts. It is 2 1/2-story wood-frame house, five bays wide, with a side gable roof, two interior chimneys, and clapboard siding. It has a Greek Revival entrance, flanked by sidelight windows and pilasters and topped by an entablature. The house was built in 1834 by Davis Mills, member of one of Needham's major landowning families at the time. Mills was a butcher, tavernkeeper, and politically active citizen. The junction where his house is located, Central Avenue and Nehoiden Street, was Needham's town center until the 19th century.

The house was listed on the National Register of Historic Places in 1982.

== See also ==
- National Register of Historic Places listings in Norfolk County, Massachusetts
