= Otis Cary House =

Historic house in Massachusetts, United States

- U.S. National Register of Historic Places
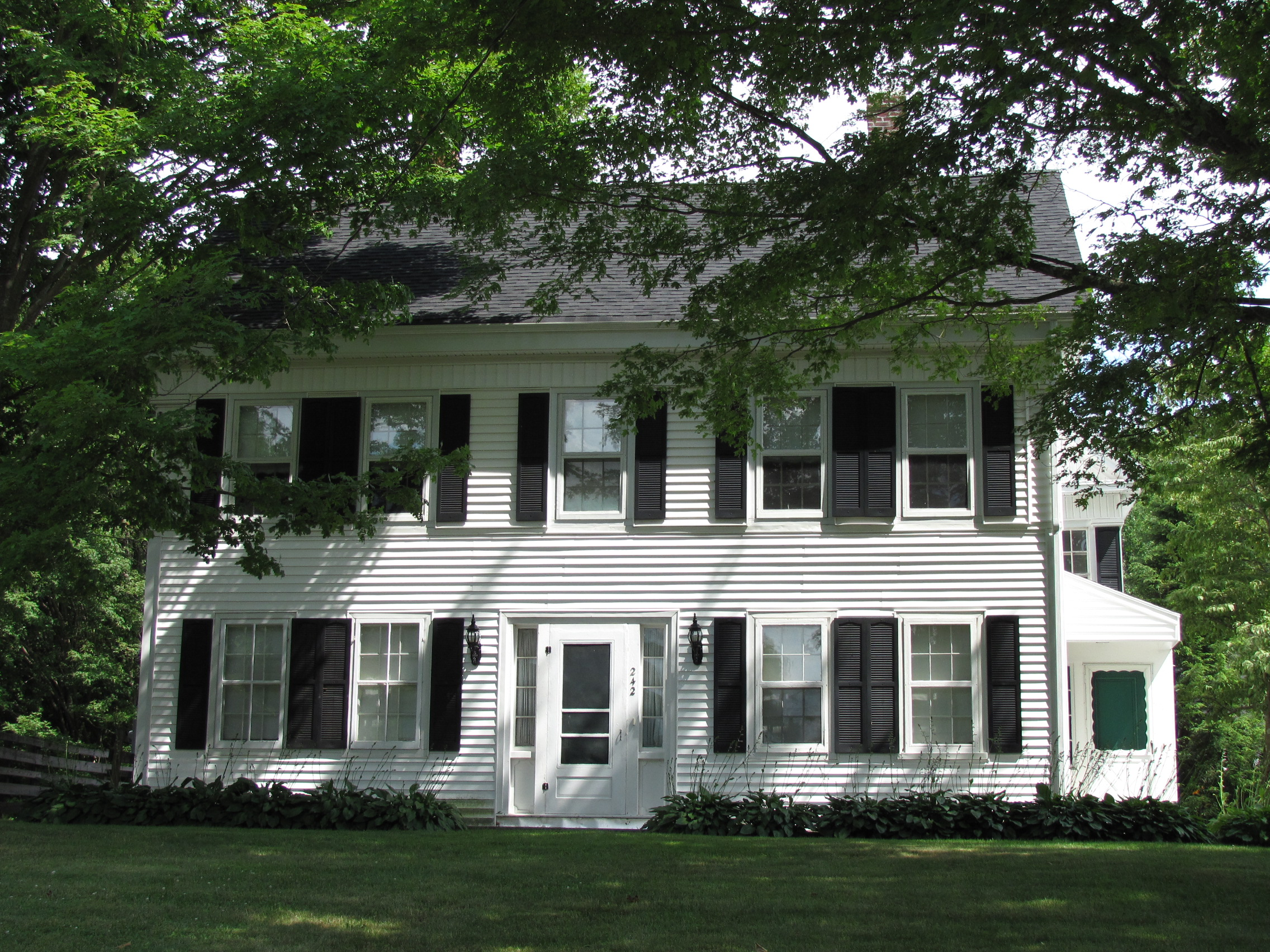
- Otis Cary House

- Location within Massachusetts Location within the United States
- Location: 242 South Street, Foxboro, Massachusetts
- Coordinates: 42°2′42″N 71°15′36″W
- Built: 1837
- Architectural style: Greek Revival
- NRHP reference No.: 86000379
- Added to NRHP: March 13, 1986

The Otis Cary House is a historic house in Foxboro, Massachusetts. It is a 2 1/2-story wood-frame house, five bays wide, with a side-gable roof, twin end chimneys, and a central entrance with flanking sidelights. It was built in 1837 by Otis Cary, a leading businessman and politician in the town. Cary owned the foundry on Mill Street, and was active in town and state politics. Cary's grandson, the noted educator Frank Boyden, was born in this house.

The house was listed on the National Register of Historic Places in 1986. It is now home to Bright Start Child Care.

== See also ==
- National Register of Historic Places listings in Norfolk County, Massachusetts
