= Sea Street Historic District =

Historic district in Massachusetts, United States

- U.S. National Register of Historic Places
- U.S. Historic district
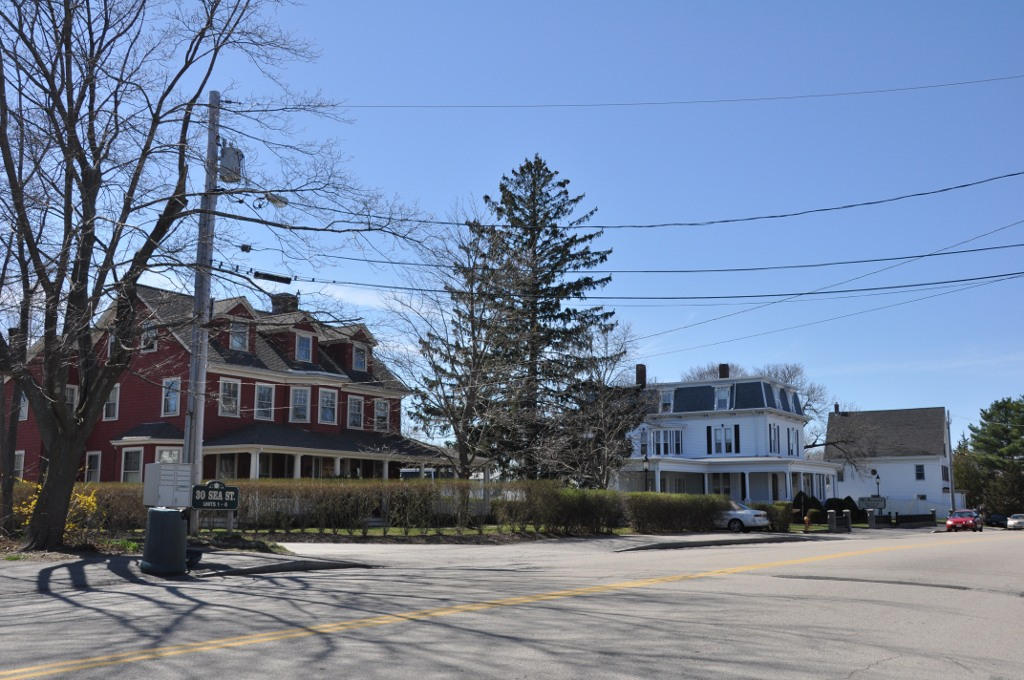
- View of Sea Street

- Location within Massachusetts Location within the United States
- Location: Weymouth, Massachusetts
- Coordinates: 42°14′35″N 70°56′54″W
- Area: 49 acres (20 ha)
- NRHP reference No.: 09000646
- Added to NRHP: August 19, 2009

The Sea Street Historic District encompasses a portion of North Weymouth, Massachusetts that encapsulates 300 years of history in the town. The district is centered on a triangular area bounded by North Street, Bridge Street, and Sea Street, with extensions along Shaw Street, Curtis Street, and North Street as far as south as Neck Street. Predominantly residential in character, the district includes more than 150 buildings, dating from the 17th to the 20th century. Its most prominent features include Beals Park (on Bridge Street, established in the 1880s) and the 1852 Greek Revival Congratational Church on Athens Street. Most of the district's early buildings are modest in character, and are sparingly decorated; one of the more elaborate of these is the c. 1810 Federal period house at 180 North Street/555 Bridge Street. The oldest structure in the district is believed to be the Bicknell House at 82-84 Sea Street, a c. 1650 1 1/2-story Cape style house.

The district was added to the National Register of Historic Places in 2009.

== See also ==
- National Register of Historic Places listings in Norfolk County, Massachusetts
