= McIntosh Corner Historic District =

Historic district in Massachusetts, United States

- U.S. National Register of Historic Places
- U.S. Historic district
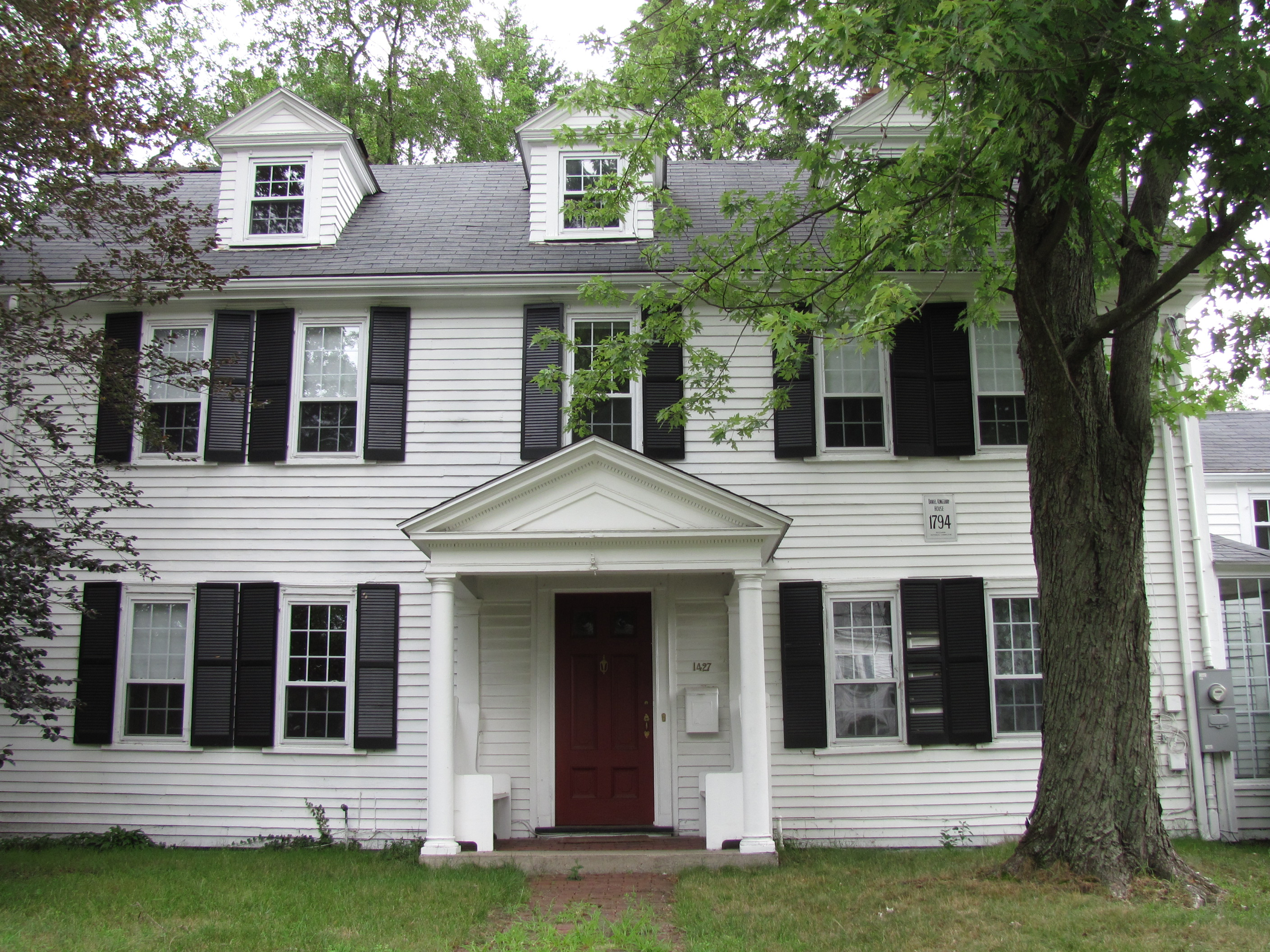
- Daniel Kingsbury House

- Location within Massachusetts Location within the United States
- Location: Needham, Massachusetts
- Coordinates: 42°16′52″N 71°15′17″W
- Area: 11.1 acres (4.5 ha)
- Architectural style: Mid 19th Century Revival, Late 19th And 20th Century Revivals, Early Republic
- NRHP reference No.: 88003127
- Added to NRHP: January 5, 1989

The McIntosh Corner Historic District is a historic district encompassing an area that was formerly the principal town center of Needham, Massachusetts. This cluster of mainly residential buildings, surrounding the junction of Great Plain Avenue and Central Street, declined in importance when the railroad bypassed it, resulting in the eventual relocation of the town's village center to its present location, about 1 mile (1.6 km) to the east. The district was added to the National Register of Historic Places in 1989.

== Description and history ==
The town of Needham, a suburb west of Boston, was settled in the early 18th century and incorporated in 1711. The approximate routes of both Great Plain Avenue and Central Street were originally trails used by Native Americans, and were developed into roads by the colonial settlers. The original town center was located about 0.25 miles (0.40 km) to the north, and this junction grew as a secondary node of development in the late 18th century. Opposition to the routing of the railroad parallel to Central Avenue through the center and this junction resulted in its placement further to the east in 1853, after which the area declined in importance.

The district, about 11 acres (4.5 ha) in size, includes fifteen historically significant properties (and ten that are not), centered at the junction of Great Plain Avenue and Central Street, extending in each direction for only a short distance. The most prominent building in the district is the Presbyterian Church, a modern building. It is the cohesive character of the residential buildings that gives the district its character. Virtually all of them are wood-frame structures, 2 1/2 stories in height, and between 3 and 5 bays wide. Most are five bays wide, a typical late colonial or Federal period form, with a center entrance and two interior chimneys. The oldest house in the district, the Daniel Kingsbury House (1794), is typical of this form. Originally Federal in style, it was later modified with Greek Revival and Colonial Revival alterations.

== See also ==
- National Register of Historic Places listings in Norfolk County, Massachusetts
