= Roebuck Tavern =

- U.S. National Register of Historic Places
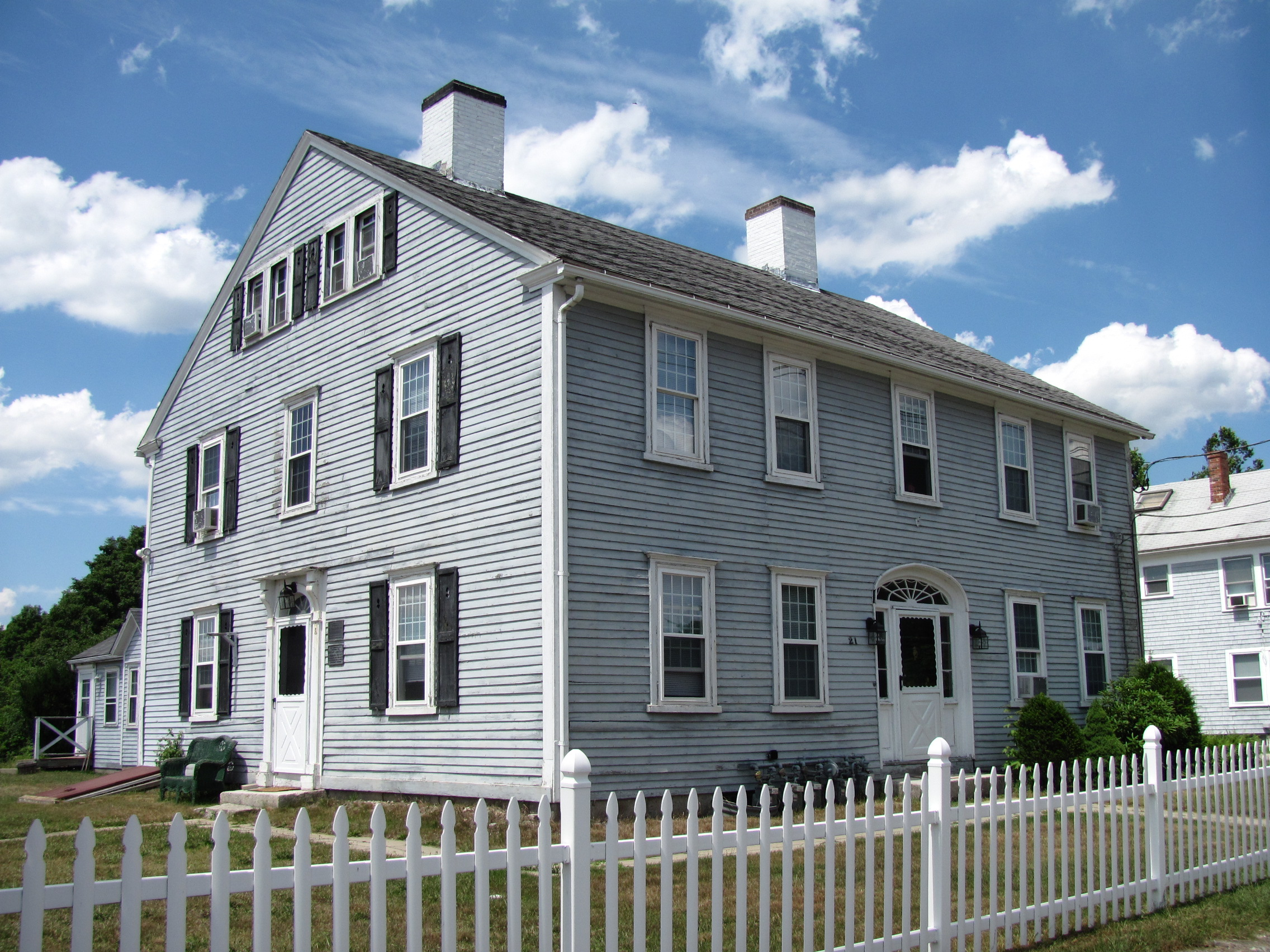
- Roebuck Tavern

- Location within Massachusetts Location within the United States
- Location: Wrentham, Massachusetts
- Coordinates: 42°4′3″N 71°19′41″W
- Built: 1795
- Architectural style: Federal
- NRHP reference No.: 84002878
- Added to NRHP: May 17, 1984

The Roebuck Tavern is a historic tavern at 21 Dedham Street in Wrentham, Massachusetts. The two-story Federal style structure was built in 1795 by David Fisher, whose family was one of the earliest to settle the area in the 17th century. Fisher operated a tavern, which would have been successful, as Wrentham was then a stop on the stagecoach route between Boston and Providence, Rhode Island. The building remained in the Fisher family until 1910.

The tavern was listed on the National Register of Historic Places in 1984.

== See also ==
- National Register of Historic Places listings in Norfolk County, Massachusetts
