= Pondville Cemetery =

Historic cemetery in Massachusetts, United States

- U.S. National Register of Historic Places
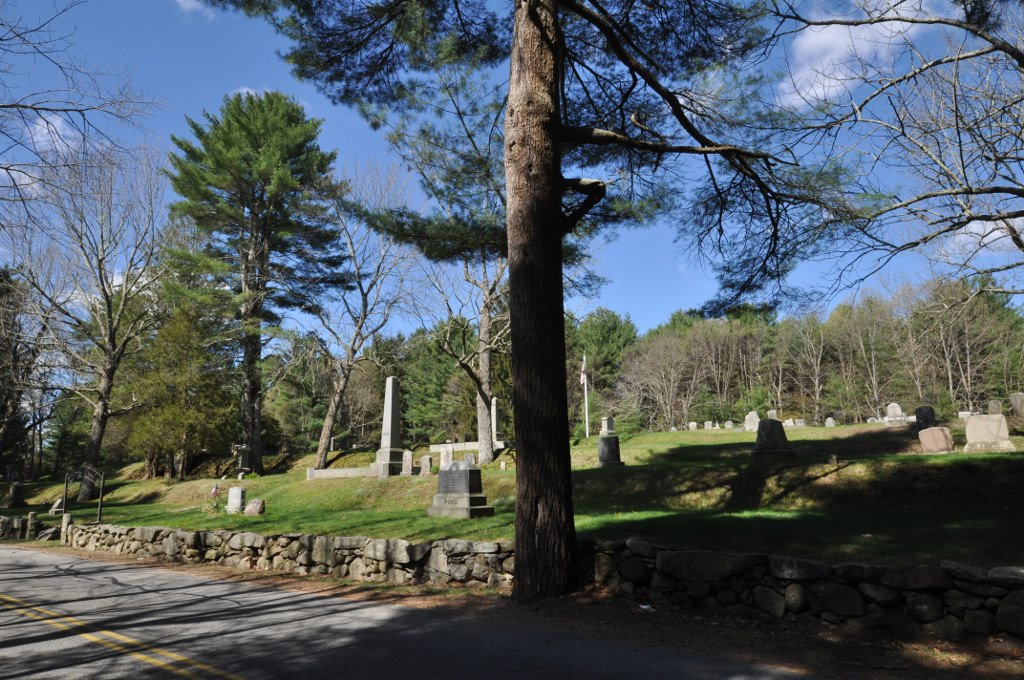

- Location within Massachusetts Location within the United States
- Location: Everett Street, Norfolk, Massachusetts
- Coordinates: 42.085122°N 71.29505°W
- NRHP reference No.: 14000158
- Added to NRHP: April 15, 2014

Pondville Cemetery, located on Everett Street, is one of the two oldest cemeteries in Norfolk, Massachusetts. It was established c. 1757, when Norfolk was still part of Wrentham, and now abuts the town line of the two communities. Its address is just inside Wrentham's town limits.

It was established to serve the residents of the Pondville village, which was first settled in the 1730s. The cemetery is laid out on a series of terraces that rise from Everett Street to the west, with the oldest graves in the southwest corner, near the Wrentham line. The oldest stones date to the early 19th century, and one of the most prominent markers is the c.1877 Victorian memorial to Captain Abijah Pond, an American Revolutionary War veteran.

The cemetery was listed on the National Register of Historic Places in 2014.

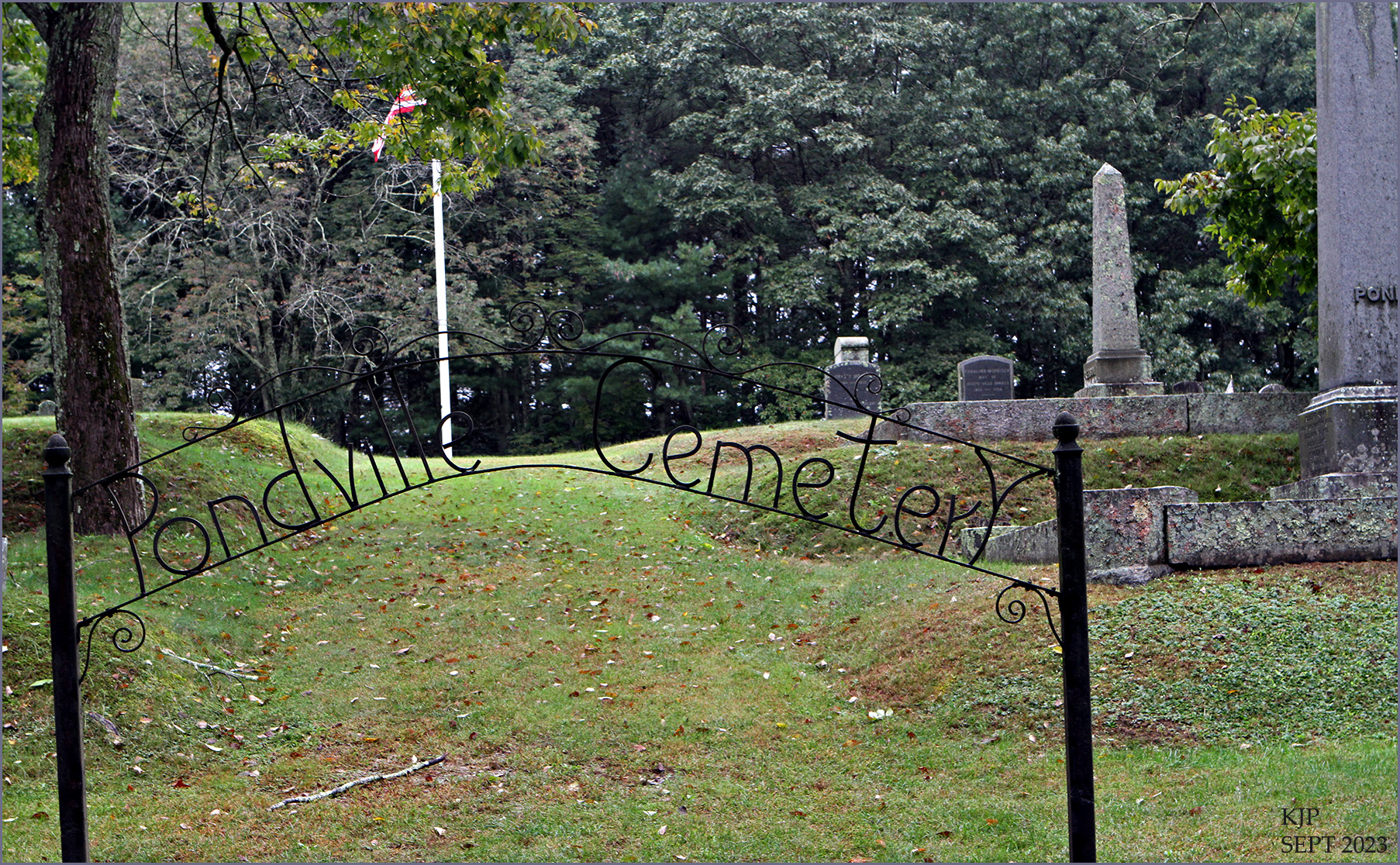
Pondville Cemetery, Wrentham, MA; Sept. 24, 2023 image

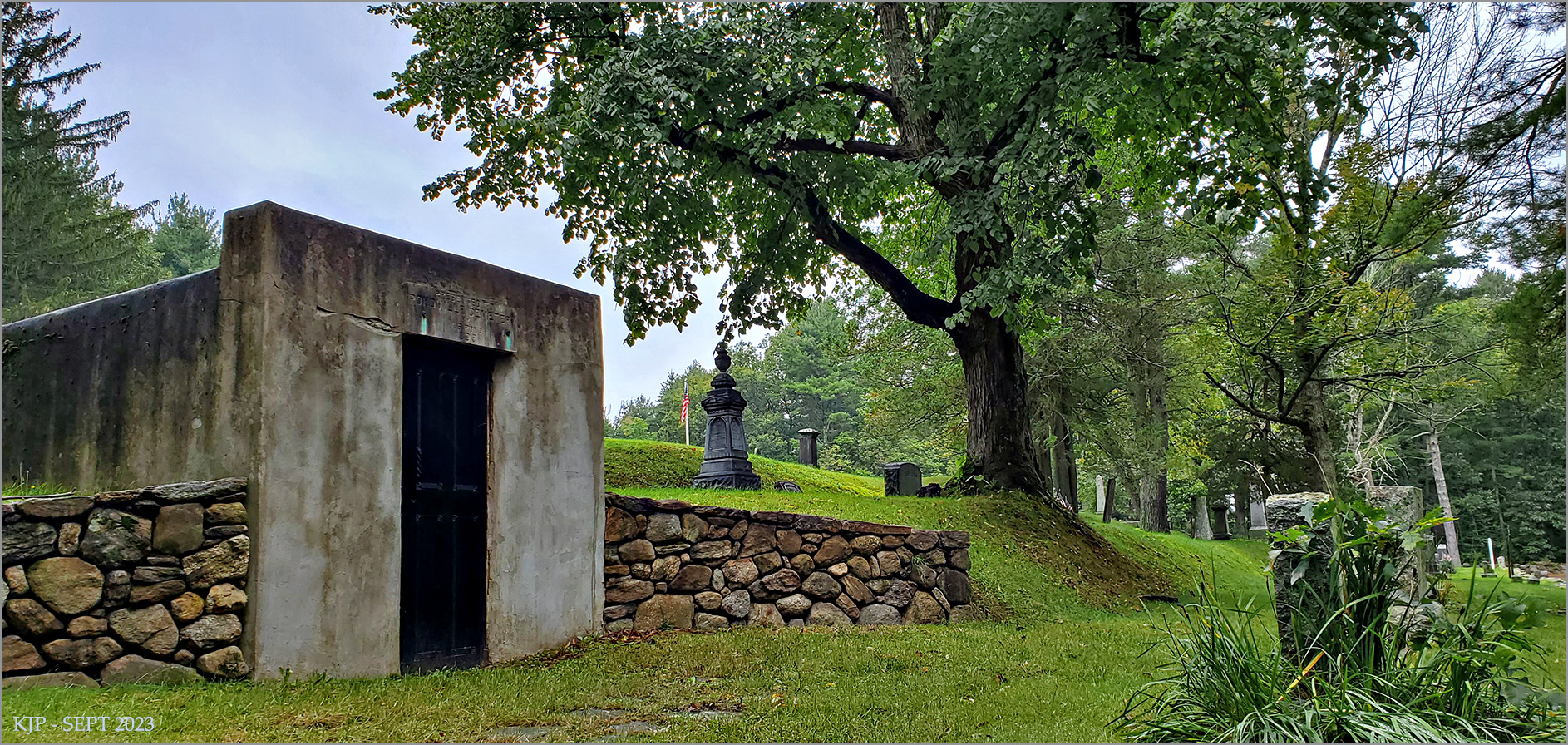
Pondville Cemetery, graves along Everett St.

== See also ==
- National Register of Historic Places listings in Norfolk County, Massachusetts
