= Stoneholm =

Historic house in Massachusetts, United States

- U.S. National Register of Historic Places
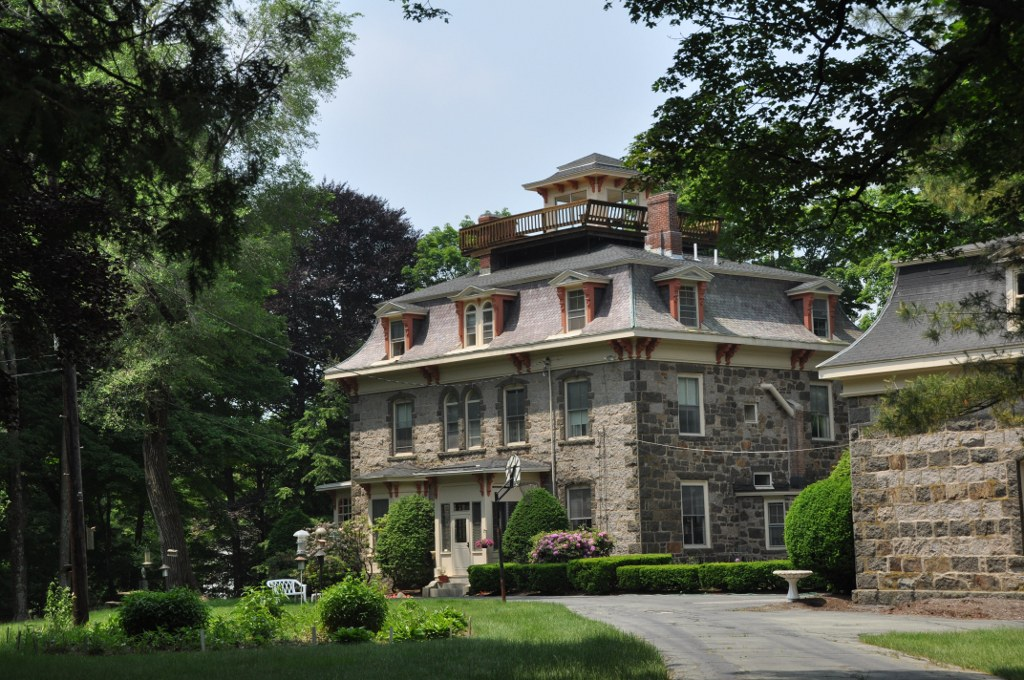

- Location within Massachusetts Location within the United States
- Location: 188 Ames Street, Sharon, Massachusetts
- Coordinates: 42°6′55″N 71°9′57″W
- Built: 1864
- Architectural style: Second Empire
- NRHP reference No.: 80000648
- Added to NRHP: April 2, 1980

Stoneholm is a historic house in Sharon, Massachusetts. The 2 1/2-story stone house was built c. 1848, and is a distinctive Victorian house, exhibiting Second Empire and Italianate details executed in granite from the local Moyles Quarry near Borderland State Park. Built for Horace Augustus Lothrop. The house has a mansard roof with flared eaves, with a rooftop deck and cupola. The main facade is divided into three bays, with the entry in the central bay, sheltered by a wraparound single-story porch. The center bay on the second level has a pair of round-arch windows, a feature echoed in the roof dormer directly above.

The house was listed on the National Register of Historic Places in 1980.

== See also ==
- National Register of Historic Places listings in Norfolk County, Massachusetts
