= Wellesley Hills Branch Library =

- U.S. National Register of Historic Places
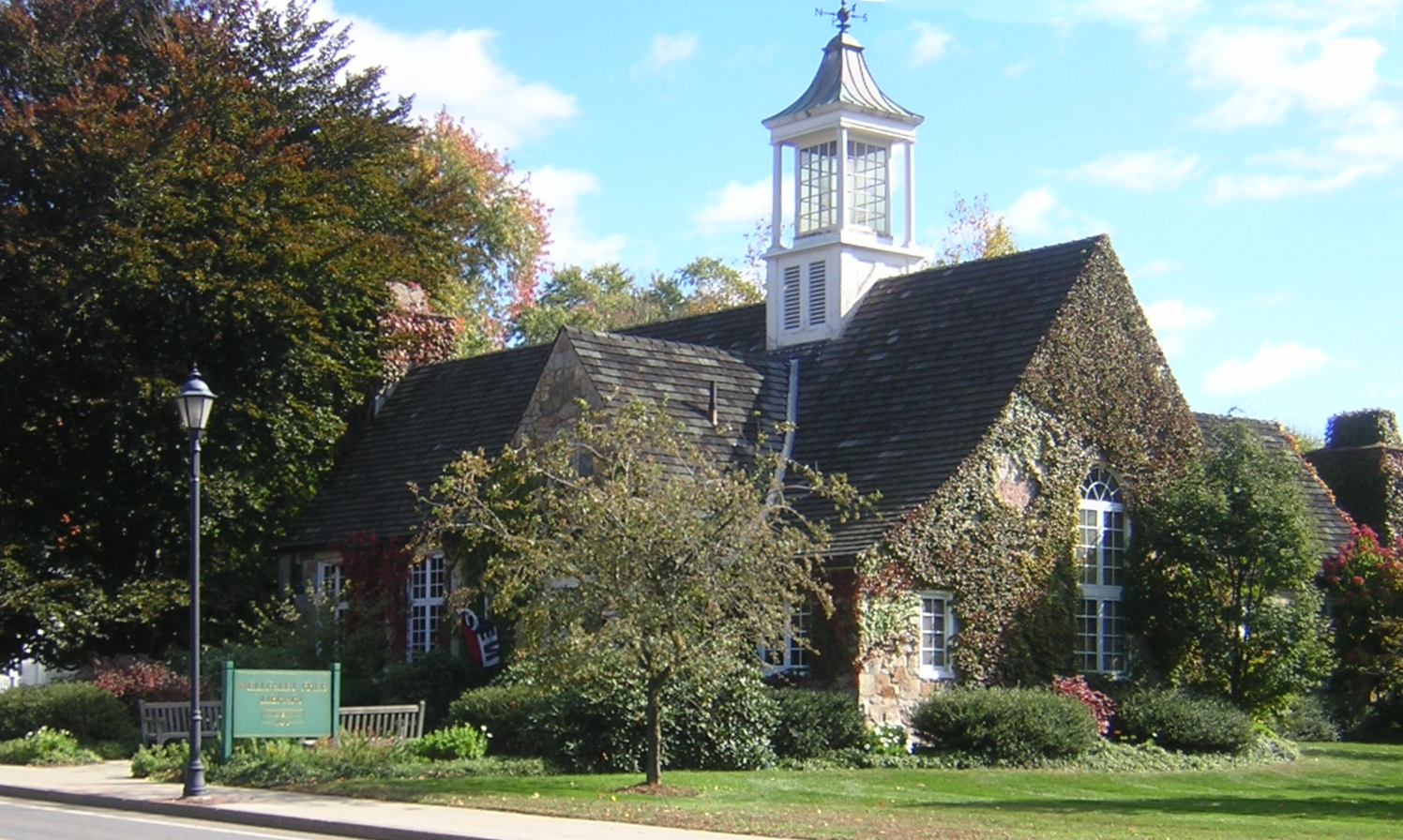
- View from west

- Location within Massachusetts Location within the United States
- Location: Wellesley, Massachusetts
- Coordinates: 42°18′53″N 71°16′15.5″W
- Built: 1927
- Architect: Shirer, Hampton F.; Hannaford, R.H.
- Architectural style: Colonial Revival
- NRHP reference No.: 07000546
- Added to NRHP: June 12, 2007

The Wellesley Hills Branch Library is a historic library building at 210 Washington Street in Wellesley, Massachusetts. The stone building was designed in 1927 by Hampton F. Shirer, whose plans were developed from the sketches of the late Ralph H. Hannaford, and completed in 1928. The Colonial Revival building is L-shaped, with single story above a raised basement. It is faced in local fieldstone. The main block has a five-bay side-gable configuration with a projecting entry pavilion. It is the town's first purpose-built branch library.

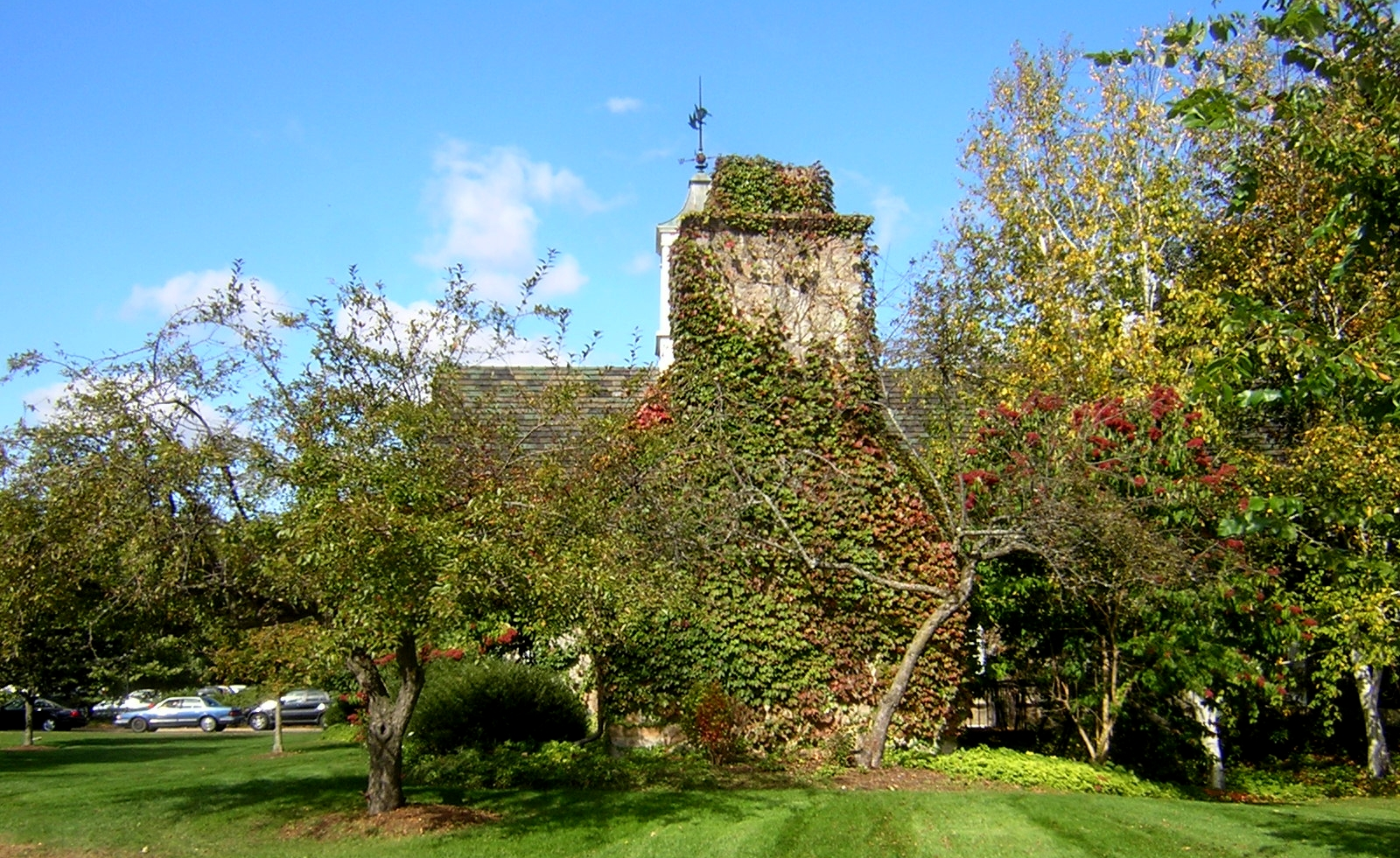
View from southeast

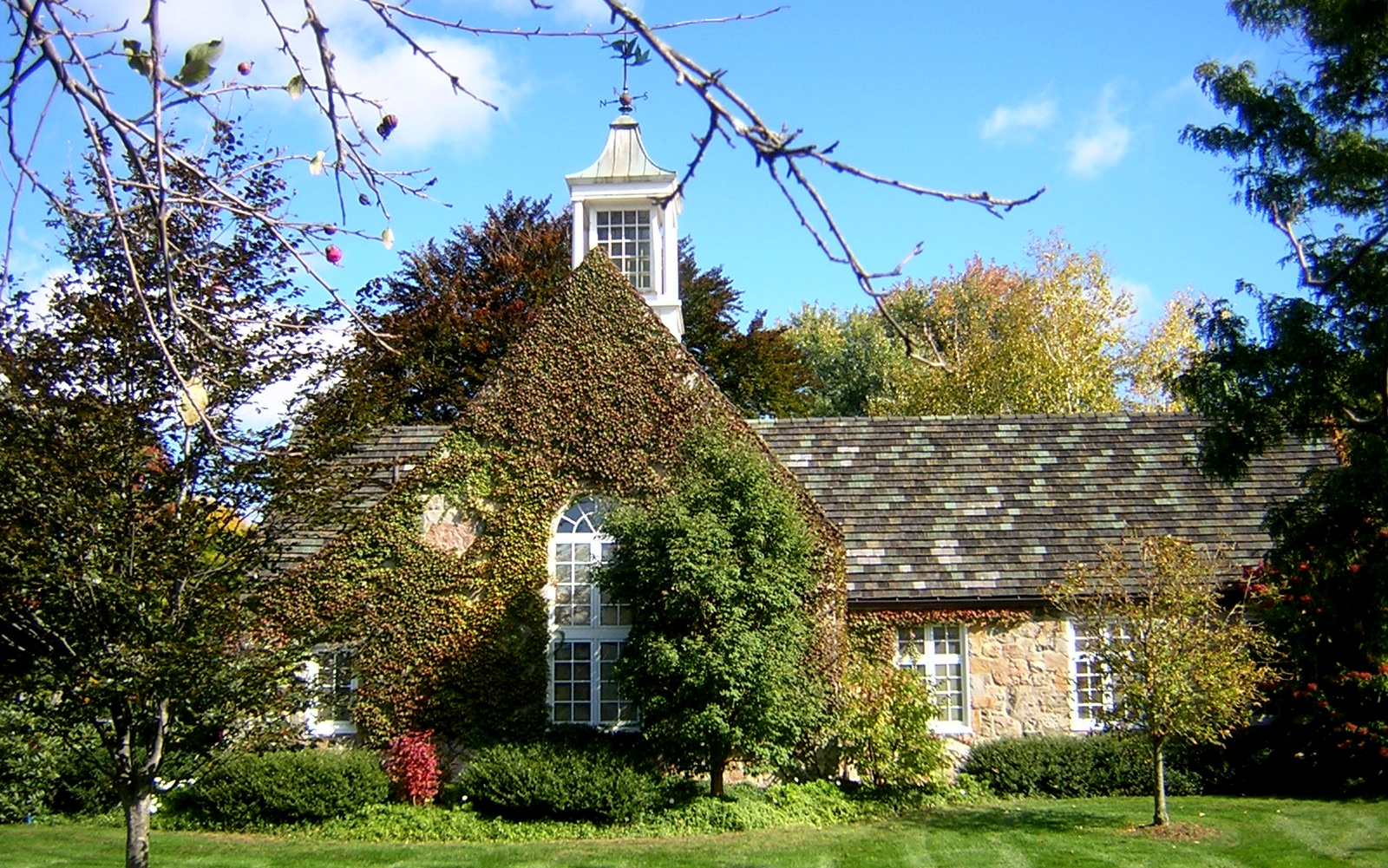
View from southwest

The building was listed on the National Register of Historic Places in 2007.

== See also ==
- National Register of Historic Places listings in Norfolk County, Massachusetts
