= Fuller Brook Park =

- U.S. National Register of Historic Places
- U.S. Historic district
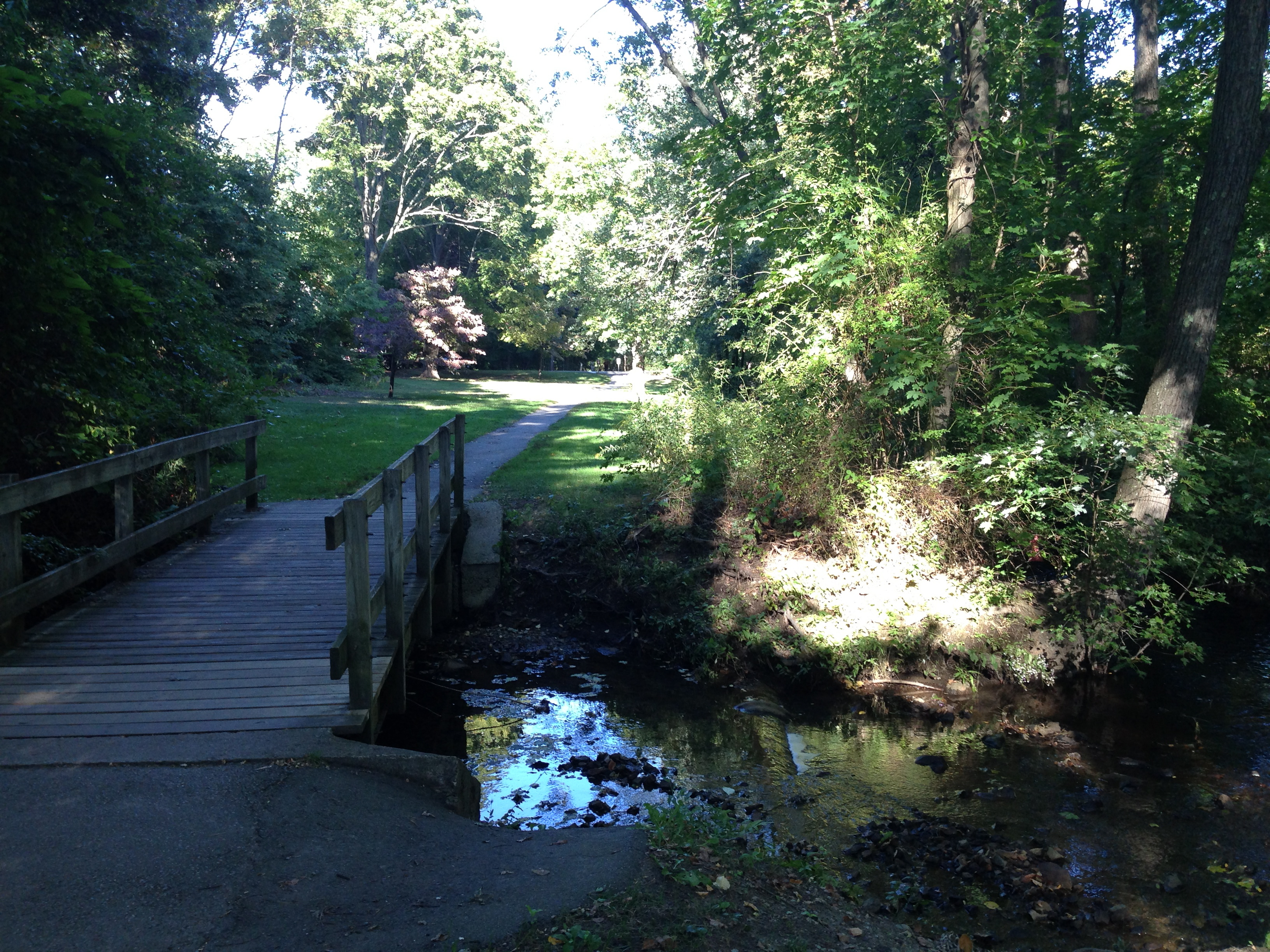

- Location within Massachusetts Location within the United States
- Location: Dover Road to Maugus Ave., Wellesley, Massachusetts
- Coordinates: 42°18′39″N 71°16′26″W
- Area: 35.2 acres (14.2 ha)
- NRHP reference No.: 11000307
- Added to NRHP: May 29, 2013

Fuller Brook Park is a public park of the town of Wellesley, Massachusetts. The park was established in 1899 as a roughly linear park for both recreational and flood control purposes, and did not reach mature completion until the 1930s. The park was designed by John Charles Olmsted (nephew of Frederick Law Olmsted and a noted landscape designer in his own right) and others. The park runs roughly parallel to Washington Street through the central part of the town, along Fuller Brook and one of its tributaries, Caroline Brook. Despite its naturalistic appearance, the watercourses have been extensively channeled.

A large portion of the park, between Dover Road and Maugus Avenue but excluding the developed area of Hunnewell Field and Wellesley High School, was listed on the National Register of Historic Places in 2013.

== See also ==
- National Register of Historic Places listings in Norfolk County, Massachusetts
