= Redman Farm House =

Historic house in Massachusetts, United States

- U.S. National Register of Historic Places
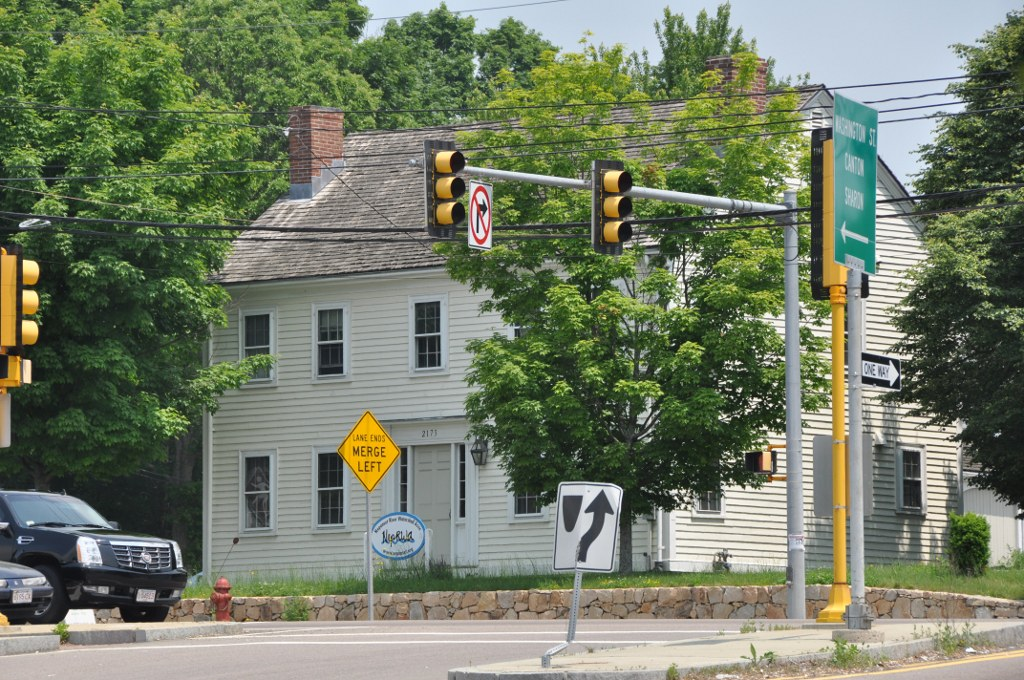

- Location within Massachusetts Location within the United States
- Location: 2173 Washington Street, Canton, Massachusetts
- Coordinates: 42°11′31″N 71°6′39″W
- Built: 1795
- Architectural style: Federal
- MPS: Blue Hills and Neponset River Reservations MRA
- NRHP reference No.: 80000664
- Added to NRHP: September 25, 1980

The Redman Farm House is a historic house in Canton, Massachusetts. It is a 2 1/2-story wood-frame structure, five bays wide, with a side-gable roof, end chimneys, and clapboard siding. The house was built in 1795, and is one Canton's few surviving 18th-century houses. It stands on land that was deeded to Robert Redman in 1722 by the local Native Americans.

The building was added to the National Register of Historic Places in 1980, where it is incorrectly listed as being at the corner of Washington St. and Homans Lane.

== See also ==
- National Register of Historic Places listings in Norfolk County, Massachusetts
