= Deacon Willard Lewis House =

Historic house in Massachusetts, United States

- U.S. National Register of Historic Places
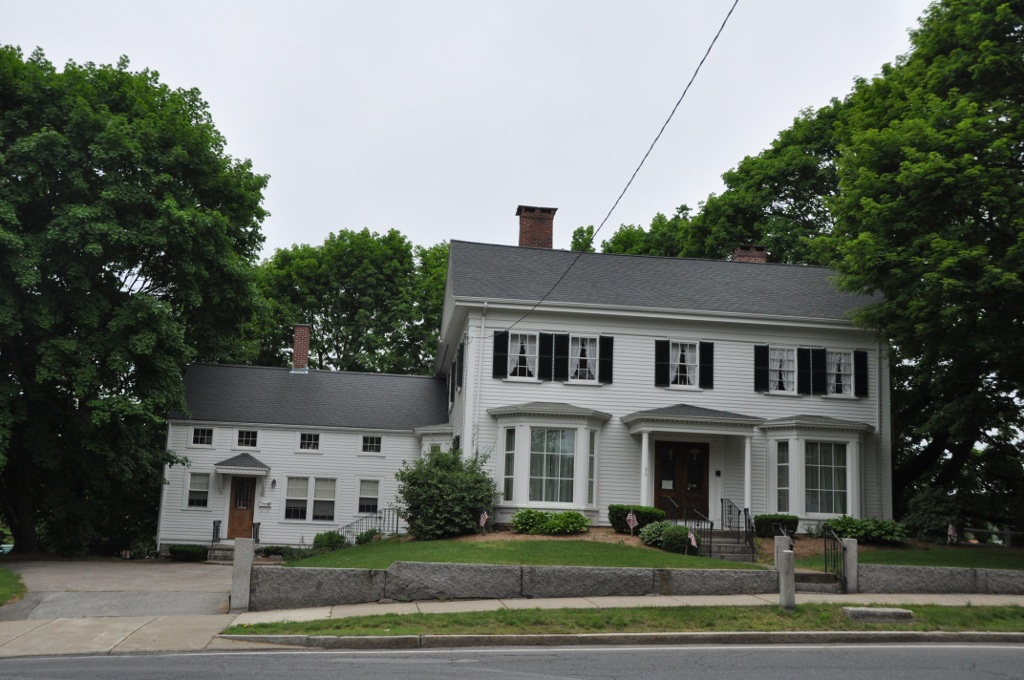

- Location within Massachusetts Location within the United States
- Interactive map showing the location of Deacon Willard Lewis House
- Location: Walpole, Massachusetts
- Coordinates: 42°8′42″N 71°15′19″W
- Built: 1826
- NRHP reference No.: 75000297
- Added to NRHP: October 29, 1975

The Deacon Willard Lewis House is a historic house at 33 West Street in Walpole, Massachusetts. The 2 1/2-story wood-frame house was built c. 1826 by Horatio Wood. In 1863 it was purchased by Willard Lewis, owner of the Kendall Company. The house has a roughly five-bay facade, although instead of paired windows on either side of the center entry, it has bay windows on the first floor. The house is now owned by the Walpole Historical Society.

The house was listed on the National Register of Historic Places in 1975.

== See also ==
- National Register of Historic Places listings in Norfolk County, Massachusetts
