= Old South Union Church =

Historic church in Massachusetts, United States

- U.S. National Register of Historic Places
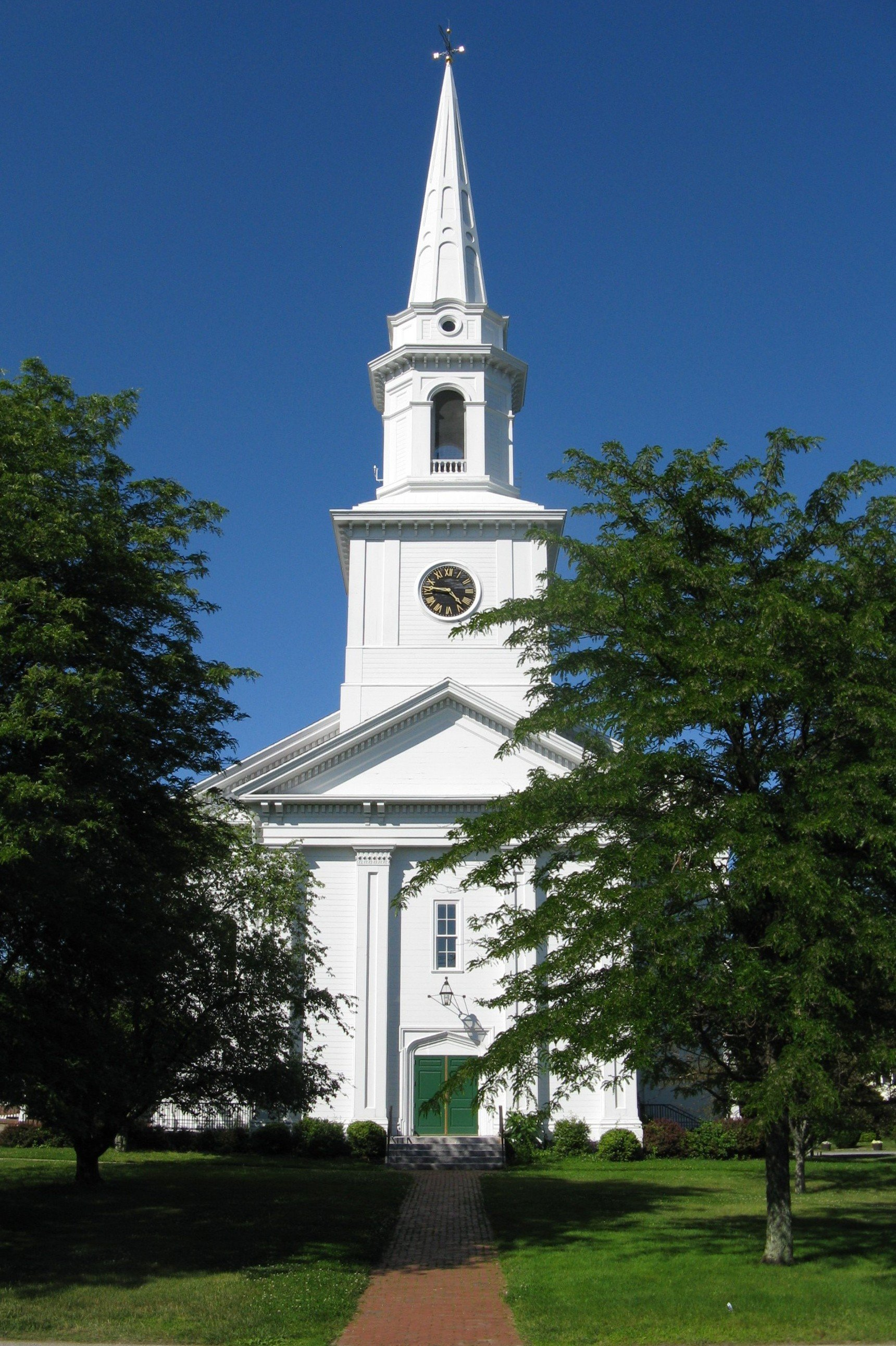
- Old South Union Church

- Location within Massachusetts Location within the United States
- Location: 25 Columbian Street, Weymouth, Massachusetts
- Coordinates: 42°10′30″N 70°57′6″W
- Built: 1854
- Architectural style: Greek Revival, Italianate
- NRHP reference No.: 82004422
- Added to NRHP: April 1, 1982

The Old South Union Church is a congregational church in Weymouth, Massachusetts. The white clapboarded church is a replica of an 1853–54 building that was destroyed by fire in 1989. The building has a strong Greek Revival, with paneled pilasters on the front facade, and also has Italianate bracketed eaves and dentillated cornice and pediment. The church building was listed the National Register of Historic Places in 1982. The congregation was established in 1721 and is affiliated with the United Church of Christ.

== See also ==
- National Register of Historic Places listings in Norfolk County, Massachusetts
