= Roberts School =

- U.S. National Register of Historic Places
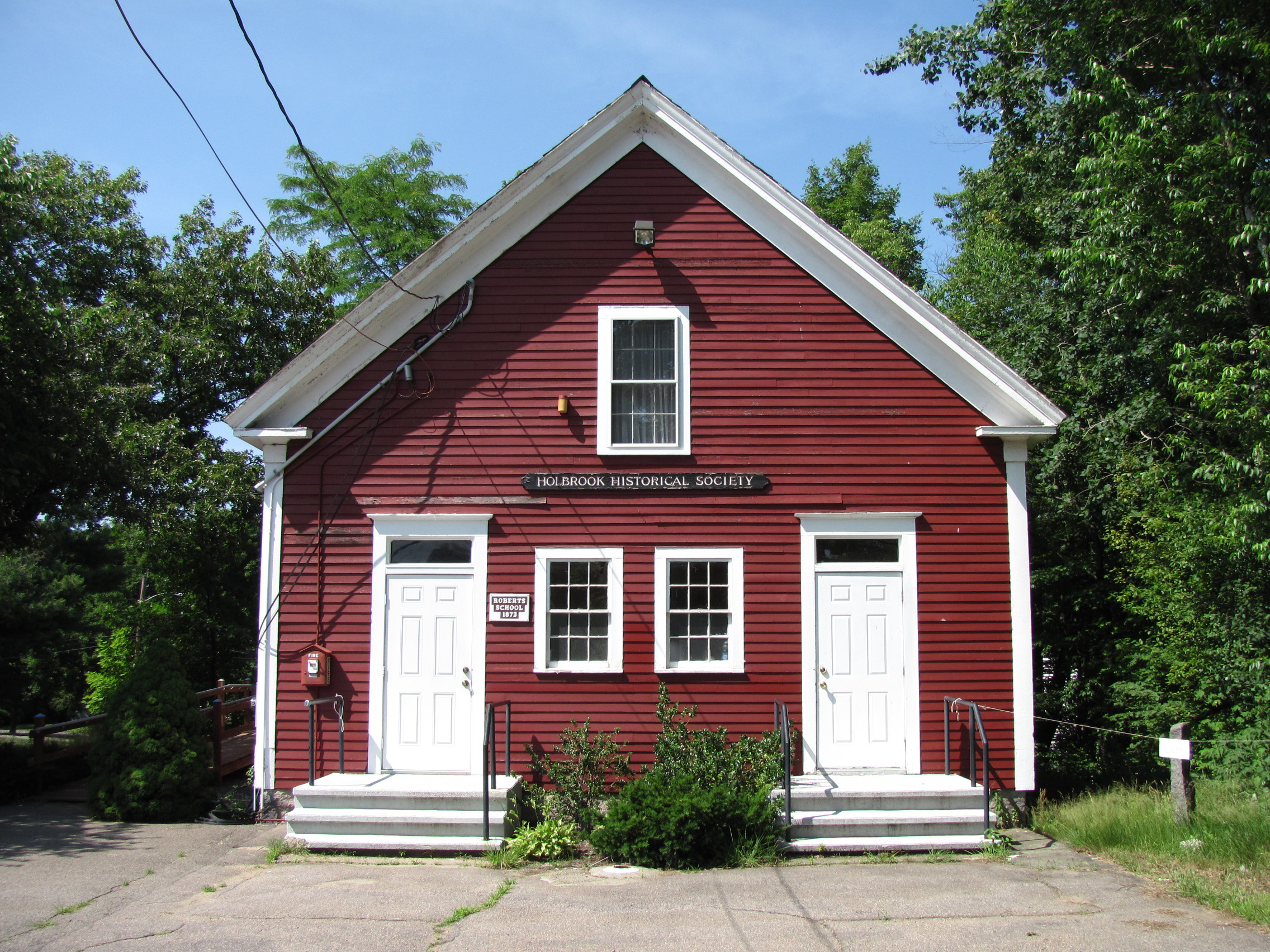
- Roberts School

- Location within Massachusetts Location within the United States
- Location: Holbrook, Massachusetts
- Coordinates: 42°9′18″N 71°1′25″W
- Architect: Morrison, M. Alden
- Architectural style: Italianate
- NRHP reference No.: 07000860
- Added to NRHP: August 30, 2007

The Roberts School is a historic school building at 320 Union Street (Massachusetts Route 139) in Holbrook, Massachusetts. The one-room schoolhouse was built in 1873; it is a 1 1/2-story wood-frame structure, with two doorways providing access to separate vestibules, as well as the singular classroom. It was the first school building the town built after incorporating, and was used as a schoolhouse until 1979. It has since 1980 been home to the Holbrook Historical Society.

The building was listed on the National Register of Historic Places in 2007.

== See also ==
- National Register of Historic Places listings in Norfolk County, Massachusetts
