= George F. Meacham =

American architect (1831–1917)

- Born: George Frederick Meacham; July 1, 1831; Watertown, Massachusetts
- Died: December 4, 1917 (aged 86); Boston, Massachusetts
- Occupation: Architect

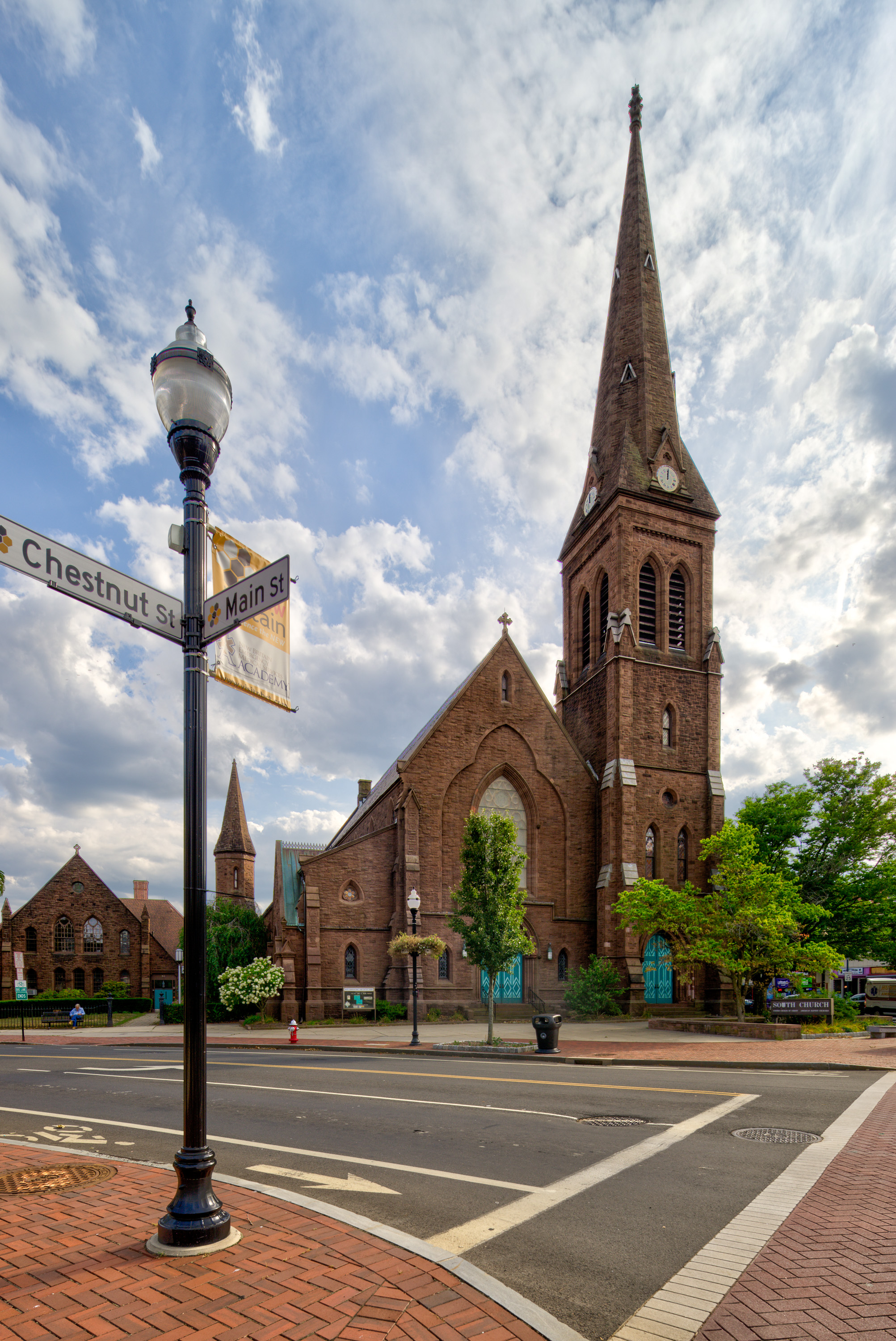
South Congregational Church, New Britain, Connecticut (1865-1868)

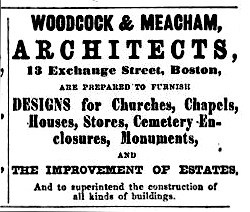
1862 advertisement for Woodcock & Meacham, Architects

George Frederick Meacham (July 1, 1831 – December 4, 1917) was an architect in the Boston, Massachusetts, area in the 19th century. He is notable for designing Boston's Public Garden, the Massachusetts Bicycle Club, and churches, homes, and monuments in greater Boston and elsewhere in New England.

== Early life and career ==
George F. Meacham was born in 1831 in Watertown, Massachusetts to Giles A. and Jane A. Meacham. In 1849, after attending schools in Newton, Waltham and Cambridge, he entered Harvard College. He graduated in 1853. After college he trained and worked as a civil engineer, at one point working on the Water Works of Jersey City, New Jersey. In 1855 he entered the office of an unnamed architect in Boston. By 1857 he was associated with architect Shepard S. Woodcock, and by 1858 they had formed a partnership. Meacham established an independent firm in Boston in 1864.

Meacham was appointed architect of Boston's new Masonic Temple in 1866, after the health of the original architect, Merrill G. Wheelock, failed. Construction had begun in 1865, and Meacham completed the exterior of the building to Wheelock's design and was responsible for the design of the interior. The building was dedicated in 1867. It has been demolished. In 1867 a set of plans for an apartment house designed by Meacham was published in an overview of charity work in France, though it does not indicate whether it was intended to be built in France or Boston, where the book was printed. Meacham continued in Boston until 1891, when he retired from active practice. He continued to work on a few projects from his home in Newton in the following years.

Though most of Meacham's work was architectural, he did his best known work in the capacity of landscape architect. In 1859 his design was adopted for the reconstruction of the Public Garden, his plan for which has remained largely intact. He was also responsible, in 1865, for an extension to the Center Cemetery of Shirley, and for Farlow Park in Newton in 1882.

== Personal life ==
In 1859 Meacham married Mary J. Warren of New Boston, New Hampshire. In 1870 they moved from Watertown to Newton. They had two children together, who both died in their youth. Mary J. Meacham died in 1877. Meacham remarried in 1881, to Ellen Louisa Frost, who survived him. Meacham died on December 4, 1917. At the time of his death he was a resident of Boston.

== Legacy ==
Following his association with Woodcock, several architects who would become notable trained in his office. These include Henry M. Francis (1864-1865) and George R. Pyne (1870s).

Several of his works have been individually listed on the United States National Register of Historic Places.

== Architectural works ==
Year	Project	Address	City	State	Notes	Image	Reference
1864	House for John A. Wiley	93 Elm St	North Andover	Massachusetts	NRHP-listed as part of the Machine Shop Village District.		
1864	South Congregational Church	90 Main St	New Britain	Connecticut	Hammatt Billings may have been associated with Meacham in the earliest phases of the design. Meacham was also responsible for the addition of a parish house in 1889. NRHP-listed.		
1865	Reformed Church of Utica	276 Genesee St	Utica	New York	Demolished.		
1866	Soldiers' and Sailors' Monument, Common Park	Purchase St	New Bedford	Massachusetts			
1866	Soldiers' Monument, Evergreen Cemetery	2060 Commonwealth Ave	Brighton	Massachusetts			
1867	Silver Lake Mills	320 Nevada St	Newton	Massachusetts			
1867	Soldiers' and Sailors' Monument, Riverside Cemetery	274 Main St	Fairhaven	Massachusetts			
1867	Tabernacle Baptist Church	8 Hopper St	Utica	New York	NRHP-listed.		
1868	Melrose High School (former)	69 W Emerson St	Melrose	Massachusetts	Demolished.		
1868	Soldiers' Monument, Waltham Common	610 Main St	Waltham	Massachusetts			
1869	Engine House No. 19	128 Babson St	Dorchester	Massachusetts	Demolished.		
1869	First Baptist Church of Lewiston	240 Bates St	Lewiston	Maine	Demolished.		
1869	Gate, Newton Cemetery	791 Walnut St	Newton	Massachusetts	Demolished.		
1870	Green School (former)	408 Merrimack St	Lowell	Massachusetts			
1871	Houses for Newton Talbot	234-236 Clarendon St	Boston	Massachusetts	Extant but altered.		
1871	Lewiston City Hall	27 Pine St	Lewiston	Maine	Burned in 1890.		
1872	Cary Avenue Baptist Church (former)	60 Tudor St	Chelsea	Massachusetts	Later the First Methodist Church of Chelsea, and now Temple Emmanuel.		
1872	House for Uriah H. Coffin	232 Clarendon St	Boston	Massachusetts			
1872	Mechanics Savings Bank Building	200 Merrimack St	Lowell	Massachusetts	Burned in 1962.		
1873	House for James W. Tobey	119 Marlborough St	Boston	Massachusetts			
1873	Mercantile building for Charles Duane	91 Water St	Boston	Massachusetts	Demolished.		
1873	Underwood School	101 Vernon St	Newton	Massachusetts	Demolished.		
1873	Walnut Avenue Congregational Church (former)	120 Walnut Ave	Roxbury	Massachusetts	Now known as the Eliot Congregational Church. NRHP-listed.		
1874	House for Charles B. Fillebrown	219 Bellevue St	Newton	Massachusetts			
1874	Newton City Hall	Washington and Cherry Sts	Newton	Massachusetts	A smaller existing building was incorporated into the new City Hall. Demolished.		
1875	Curb and fence, Tremont Mall, Boston Common	Tremont St	Boston	Massachusetts	Removed and replaced.		
1877	Central Fire Station	51 Main St	Plymouth	Massachusetts	Demolished.		
1877	Hotel Huntington	25 Commonwealth Ave	Boston	Massachusetts	Demolished.		
1877	House for Edwin Morey	338 Beacon St	Boston	Massachusetts			
1877	Whitford Block	663 Main St	Waltham	Massachusetts			
1878	House for Daniel Chamberlin	338 Commonwealth Ave	Boston	Massachusetts			
1879	House for Frank N. Thayer	325 Commonwealth Ave	Boston	Massachusetts			
1880	House for John W. Field	10 Melville Ave	Dorchester	Massachusetts			
1881	Channing Church (former)	75 Vernon St	Newton	Massachusetts	Now the Newton Presbyterian Church.		
1881	House for George C. Lord	259 Waverley Ave	Newton	Massachusetts			
1883	Hollis Street Church	28 Exeter St	Boston	Massachusetts	Later the South Congregational Church. Demolished.		
1884	House for Hartley Lord	26 Summer St	Kennebunk	Maine			
1884	Y. W. C. A. Building	40 Berkeley St	Boston	Massachusetts	Demolished.		
1885	Massachusetts Bicycle Club (former)	152 Newbury St	Boston	Massachusetts	Incorporated into the former Boston Art Club building after the club was disbanded.		
1886	Tomb for Hartley Lord, Hope Cemetery	Barnard Ln	Kennebunk	Maine			
1887	Eliot Church	474 Centre St	Newton	Massachusetts	Burned.		
1887	House for Levi B. Gay	303 Franklin St	Newton	Massachusetts			
1889	Home for Little Wanderers	202 W Newton St	Boston	Massachusetts	Demolished.		
1890	"Irwinton" for Charles I. Travelli	Highland and Chestnut Sts	Newton	Massachusetts	Burned in 1898. The former stable still stands at 22 Burnham Rd.		
1893	House for William F. Bacon	52 Hyde Ave	Newton	Massachusetts			
1894	Dickson Memorial Chapel, Greenlawn Cemetery	57 Orne St	Salem	Massachusetts	NRHP-listed as part of Greenlawn Cemetery.		
