= Jefferson School (Massachusetts) =

- Jeffer School
- U.S. National Register of Historic Places
- U.S. Historic district – Contributing property
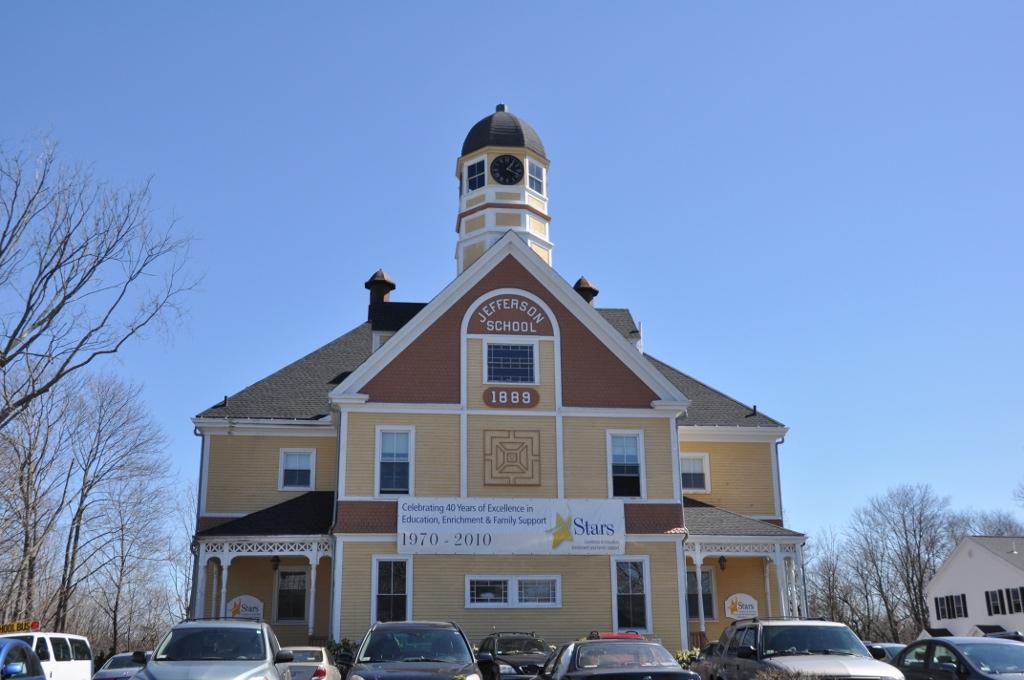

- Location within Massachusetts Location within the United States
- Location: Weymouth, Massachusetts
- Coordinates: 42°13′0″N 70°56′15″W
- Built: 1889
- Architect: Shepard S. Woodcock
- Architectural style: Queen Anne
- Part of: Central Square Historic District (ID92000040)
- NRHP reference No.: 81000114

Significant dates
- Added to NRHP: May 12, 1981
- Designated CP: February 13, 1992

The Jefferson School is a historic school at 200 Middle Street in Weymouth, Massachusetts. The Queen Anne style school was designed by Shepard S. Woodcock and was built in 1889. The four-room schoolhouse is a variant of the Washington School, built in 1887. In contrast to the latter school, this one has more symmetrical massing, but is decorated with scalloped shingles and a porch with elaborate woodwork. It is topped by an octagonal clock tower with cupola.

The building was listed on the National Register of Historic Places in 1981.

== See also ==
- National Register of Historic Places listings in Norfolk County, Massachusetts
