= Kensington Plantation House =

Historic plantation site in South Carolina, United States

- U.S. National Register of Historic Places
- Kensington Mansion

- Location within South Carolina Location within the United States
- Location: East of Eastover off South Carolina Highway 764, near Eastover, South Carolina
- Coordinates: 33°52′12″N 80°39′08″W
- Area: 175 acres (71 ha)
- Built: 1851–1854
- Architect: Edward Culliatt Jones & Francis D. Lee
- Architectural style: Second Empire
- Restored: 1981–1985
- Restored by: Union Camp
- NRHP reference No.: 71000806
- Added to NRHP: January 25, 1971

Kensington Plantation House is a historic plantation house located near Eastover, Richland County, South Carolina. It was built between 1851 and 1854 for Colonel Richard Singleton, a brother of Angelica Singleton Van Buren, daughter-in-law of President Martin Van Buren. For decades the plantation was home to hundreds of enslaved men, women, and children and later tenant farmers laboring under the sharecropping system. Kensington Mansion remained in the Singleton family until 1910 and was added to the National Register of Historic Places in 1971. It was restored by Union Camp in the early 1980s.

== Early Singleton Family History ==
In 1701, John Lawson surveyed the Carolinas and reported on the remnants of the Wateree Nation living along the Congaree and Wateree rivers. By 1762, Englishman Matthew Singleton (1730–1787) acquired 1,250 acres of land east of the Wateree River in present-day Sumter County, South Carolina. There, he and his wife, Mary Nancy James Singleton (1735–1784), enslaved an unknown number of men, women, and children that grew rice and indigo. By the time of Matthew's death in 1787, he owned over 3,000 acres—including valuable shipping lanes on Shanks and Beech creeks.

Much of this land passed to Matthew's eldest son, John Singleton (1754–1820), who in turn made a fortune selling cotton and investing in the shipping, warehousing, and shipbuilding industries. When John died in 1820, his widow, Rebecca Richardson Cooper Singleton (1752–1831), ensured his remains were buried in the family cemetery.

Upon John's death, he left his heirs eight properties, over 13,000 acres, and $30,000 in cash. Much of this passed to his eldest surviving son, Richard (1776–1852), who took over the family businesses and substantially increased his fortune by investing in cotton and the railroad industry in the early nineteenth century. Following the death of his first wife, Charlotte Videau Marion Ashby (1784–1805), John married prominent Virginian Rebecca Travis Coles (1782–1849) in 1812. Together, John and Rebecca had seven children, including Matthew Richard Singleton (1817–1854).

Matthew Richard graduated from South Carolina College, known today as the University of South Carolina, in 1838 and then served as an aide to his uncle, Andrew Stevenson (1784–1857), the U.S. Minister of the United Kingdom. Sometime after 1840 he returned from Europe and assumed management of Headquarters Plantation, one of his father's ten plantations spanning Richland, Orangeburg, and Sumter counties. In 1844, Mathew Richard married Martha Rutledge Kinloch (1818–1892), joining two wealthy and politically influential South Carolina families. While living in a two-story Georgian house, Matthew and Martha changed the plantation's name from Headquarters to Kensington and oversaw the site, which also included 40 cabins for the people they enslaved and 13 outbuildings.

== Enslaved Labor at Kensington ==
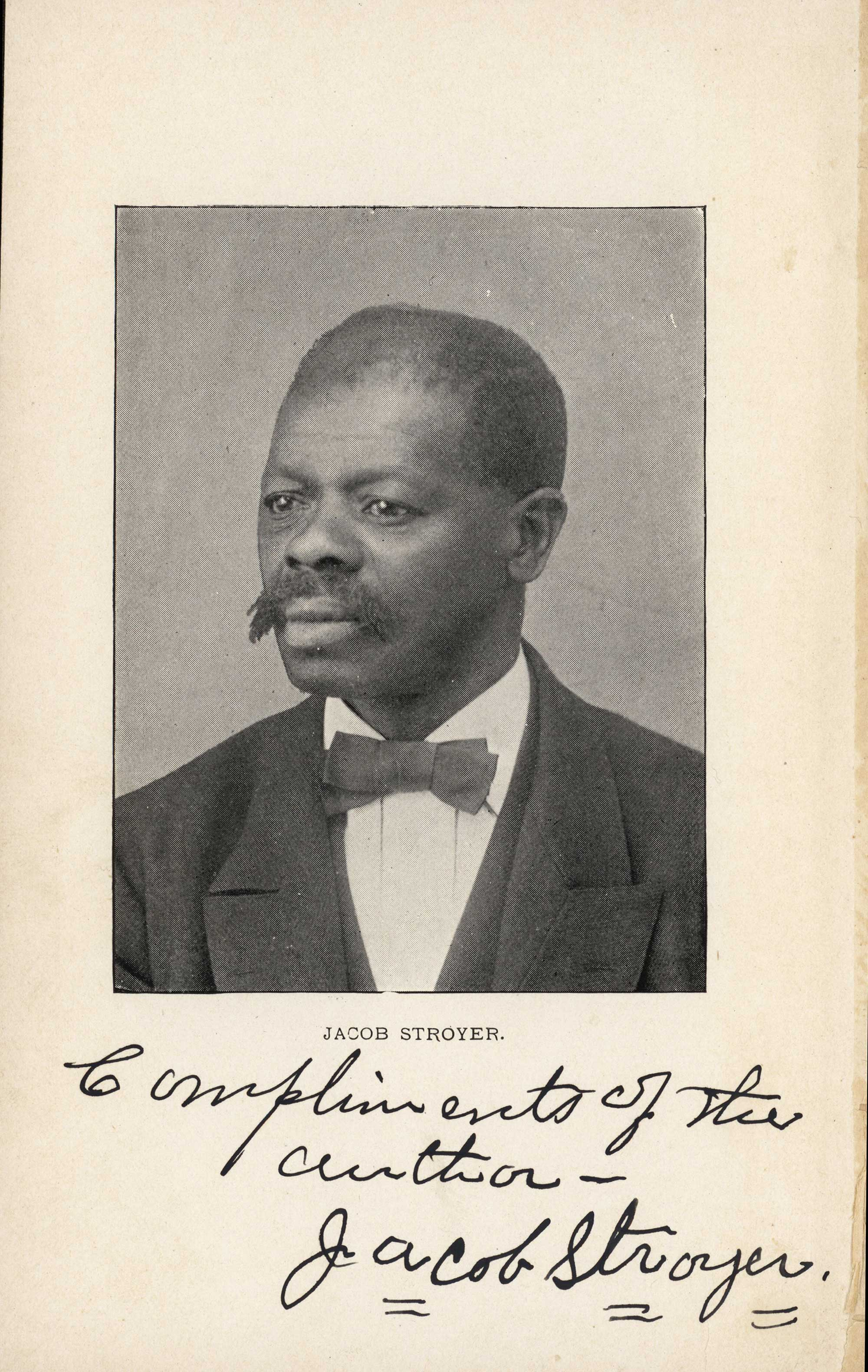
Photograph of Jacob Stroyer who was enslaved by the Singletons as a child

While Matthew Richard Singleton managed Kensington Plantation, he enslaved at least 281 men, women, and children at the site. According to the 1850 U.S. Census, 97 of these individuals were age ten or younger. Among them was Jacob Stroyer (1849–1908), who would have been less than two years old at the time. In his autobiography, My Life in the South, Jacob Stroyer described growing up around livestock and making a case to become a hostler or a groom. As a small child, he was taught to ride horses with the understanding that he would eventually compete in races sanctioned by the South Carolina Jockey Club. His training included severe whippings for being thrown. The first of these, which would have occurred around the age of five, came with the newfound knowledge that his parents could not protect him:

“And, although mother failed to help me at first, still I had faith that when he [the overseer] had taken me back to the stable yard, and commenced whipping me, she would come back and stop him, but I looked in vain, for she did not come. Then the idea first came to me that I, with my dear father and mother and the rest of my fellow negroes, was doomed to cruel treatment through life, and was defenceless [sic]."

According to the 1850 U.S. Census, the livestock Stroyer cared for included 15 horses—which included the Singleton's racing stock—80 head of cattle, 15 milk cows, 60 sheep, 217 pigs, and 28 mules. Enslaved laborers also worked the plantation's 2,600 improved acres of land, planting and harvesting 7,000 bushels of corn, 3,500 bushels of oats, 3,000 bushels of sweet potatoes, and 405 bales of cotton in 1850 alone.

When Matthew's father, Richard, died in 1852, an inventory and appraisal was completed for each of his plantations. In the appraisal for Kensington, still known at the time as Headquarters, the men, women, and children enslaved by the Singletons were listed just after the livestock and on the same page as the mules. Excluding the value of the land, Kensington Plantation was appraised at $136,448. The people enslaved at Kensington—valued at $121,600—made up almost 90% of the property value.

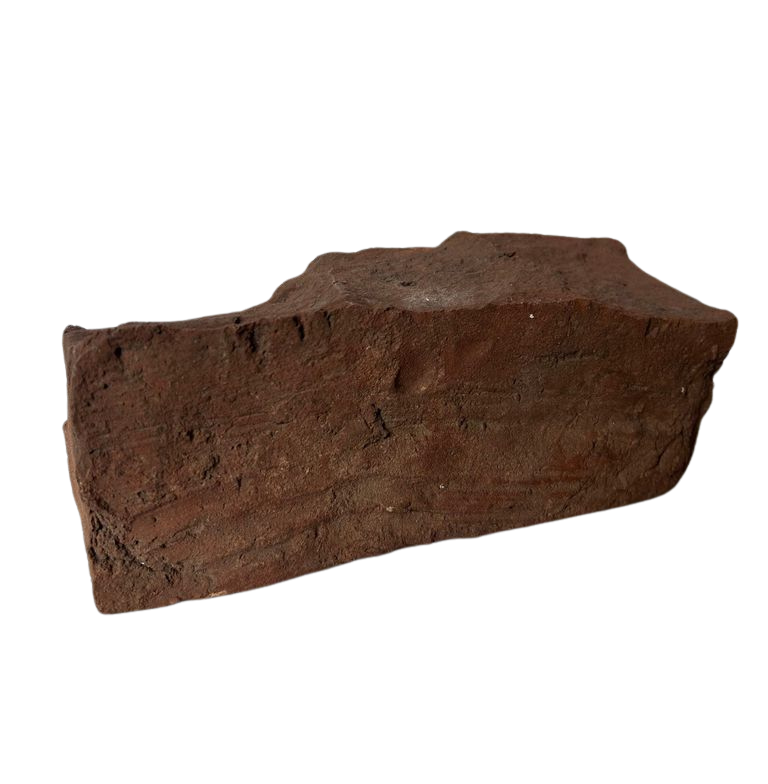
Brick containing fingerprints which were likely left by an enslaved worker at Kensington Plantation

== The Mansion's Construction & Architectural Significance ==
By the early 1850s, Matthew hired Edward Culliatt Jones (1822–1902) and Francis D. Lee (1826–1885) of Charleston to design Kensington Mansion using architectural elements from the Louvre and Palace of Fontainebleau in France as inspiration. Between 1851 and 1854, many skilled laborers enslaved by the Singletons planed the cypress and pine lumber, shaped the bricks, mixed the plaster, and forged the ironwork used in the mansion's construction. Predating the emergence of the Second Empire style in the 1870s, the resulting three-story structure, completed in 1853, consists of a cruciform floorplan, 29 rooms, and 12,000 square feet. Built on a raised brick basement, the house is made of wood and capped with a domed copper roof. The exterior includes a three-part porte-cochere with modified Corinthian arches and pilasters that feature goat heads. Inside, intricate plasterwork and cast-iron railings culminate in a glass sky light in the domed ceiling.

== Martha's Stewardship ==
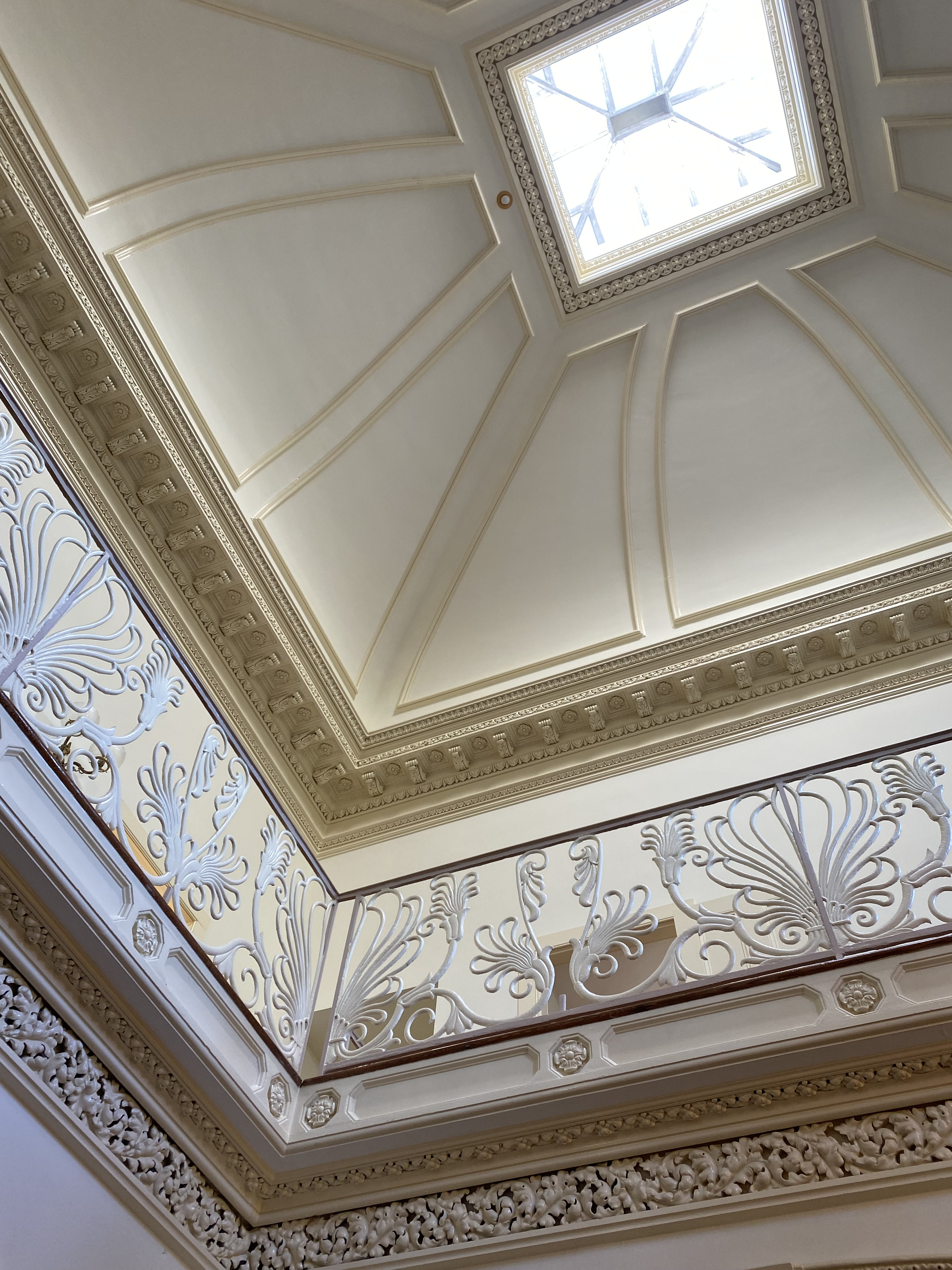
Entry hall ceiling at Kensington Plantation

On August 18, 1854, Mathew Richard Singleton died at his summer home in Flat Rock, North Carolina before Kensington Mansion was complete. Likely succumbing to tuberculosis, Matthew Richard left his wife, Martha, in debt to nearly 70 creditors in the Carolinas after a flood in 1852 and severe droughts in 1853 and 1854 decimated his crops. Describing Matthew Richard as creditors came to collect their funds in the months leading up to his death, Jacob Stroyer noted,

"He'd been none too good before to his slaves, and that made him worse, as you knew that the slave holders would revenge themselves on the slaves whenever they became angry. I had seen master whip his slaves a great many times, but never so severely as he did that spring."

In the aftermath of Matthew Richard's death, Jacob recalled Martha being "a good deal worse than he [Matthew Richard] had been." While raising three children—aged ten, eight, and three—Martha not only served as the sole executrix of her late husband's will and took possession of his real estate portfolio, she also began stewarding portions of her late father-in-law's estate on behalf of her sons, Cleland (1844–1920) and Richard (1851–1921). To settle her husband's debts and solidify her family's standing, Martha sold 38 enslaved laborers, 400 acres of land, $2,300 worth of furniture, and Matthew's racehorses. In the years to follow, she broke from social norms and settled her own business deals in person, signed purchase receipts, and reported census data under her own name.

By 1860, Martha increased the value of Kensington Plantation, growing the cash value from $30,000 to $100,000, acquiring an additional 1,600 of land, and growing her enslaved labor force from 281 men, women, and children to 465. Putting these individuals to work, Martha increased the plantation's output of wheat, corn, rice, peas, beans, sweet potatoes, hay, and sorghum while relying less on the fluctuating cost of cotton.

== Civil War & Reconstruction ==
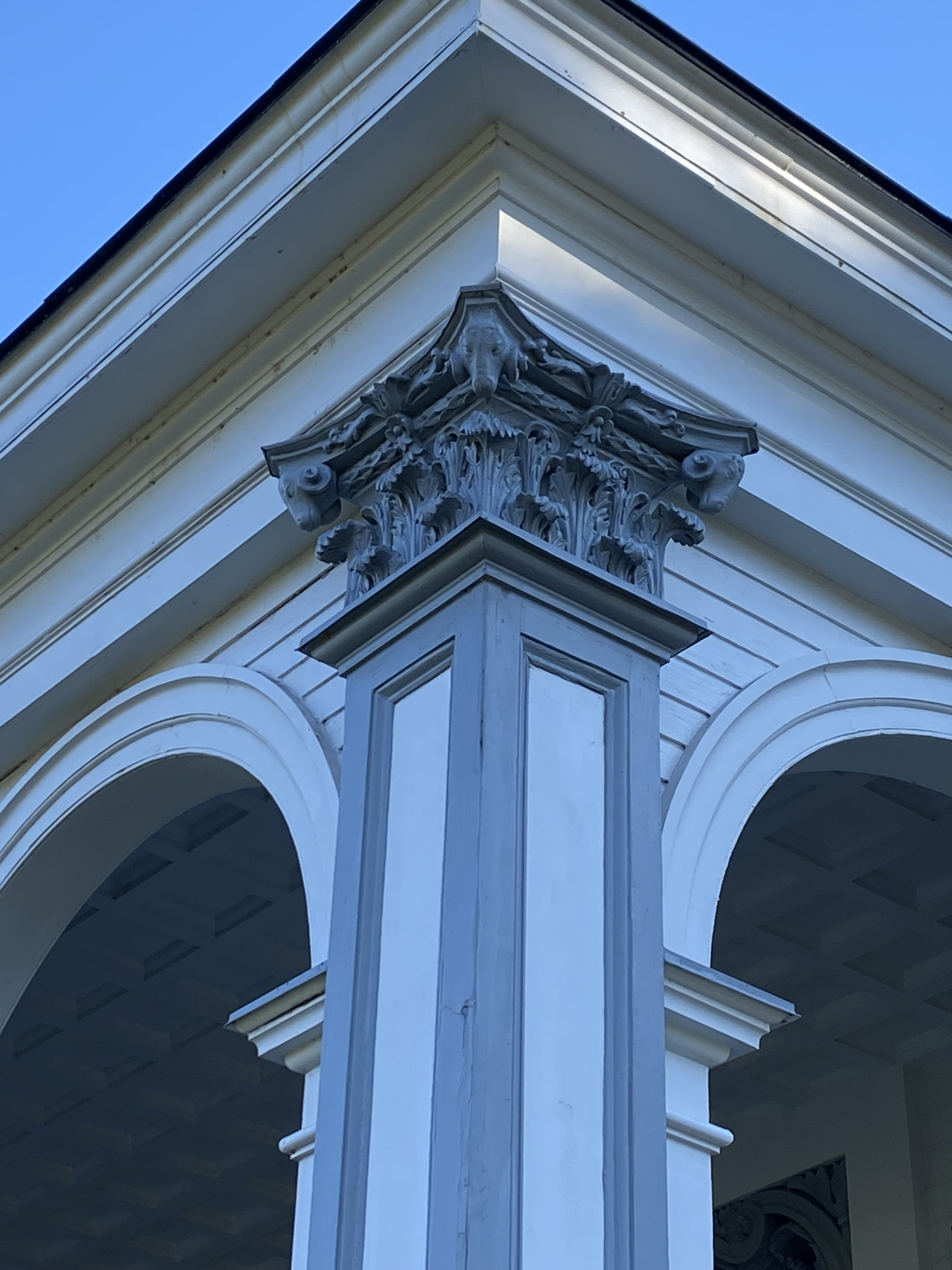
Column on the porte-cochère at Kensington Plantation

Accounts vary in regard to Martha's response to the Civil War. Elizabeth Waring McMaster (1869–1971), who wrote about Martha's daughter, Helen (1846–1924), reports that Martha fled to Flat Rock with most of her family at the beginning of the war, while Walter Edgar (b. 1943) writes that Martha remained at Kensington Plantation until she received news of General Sherman's army approaching Columbia in 1865. Jacob Stroyer's biography supports the latter account, noting that Martha sent her livestock to a nearby swamp to prevent the Union Army from confiscating them, and then fled with her mother, Mary I'On Lowndes Kinloch (1800–1865), and a few necessities.

Despite Sherman's army destroying the Kingville railway depot nearby, Kensington Mansion was spared a similar fate. Following the war, Martha returned to Kensington Mansion but took frequent trips to Flat Rock and Charleston after her sons began managing the many men, women, and children they previously enslaved—and who had since become tenant farmers operating under the sharecropping system—in the late 1860s. In 1878, she moved to Columbia to live with Helen and her husband, Allen Jones Green (1846–1910), on the northwest corner of Sumter and Pendleton streets. She died from typhoid fever at age 74 and was buried in the graveyard at St. John in the Wilderness Church in Flat Rock.

Meanwhile, Jacob Stroyer attended schools in Columbia and Charleston before moving to Worcester, Massachusetts, in 1870. He later became a licensed minister in the African Methodist Episcopal Church (often called the AME Church). He died of heart disease in Salem, Massachusetts, in 1908 and was buried in Greenlawn Cemetery.

== Kensington in the 1900s ==
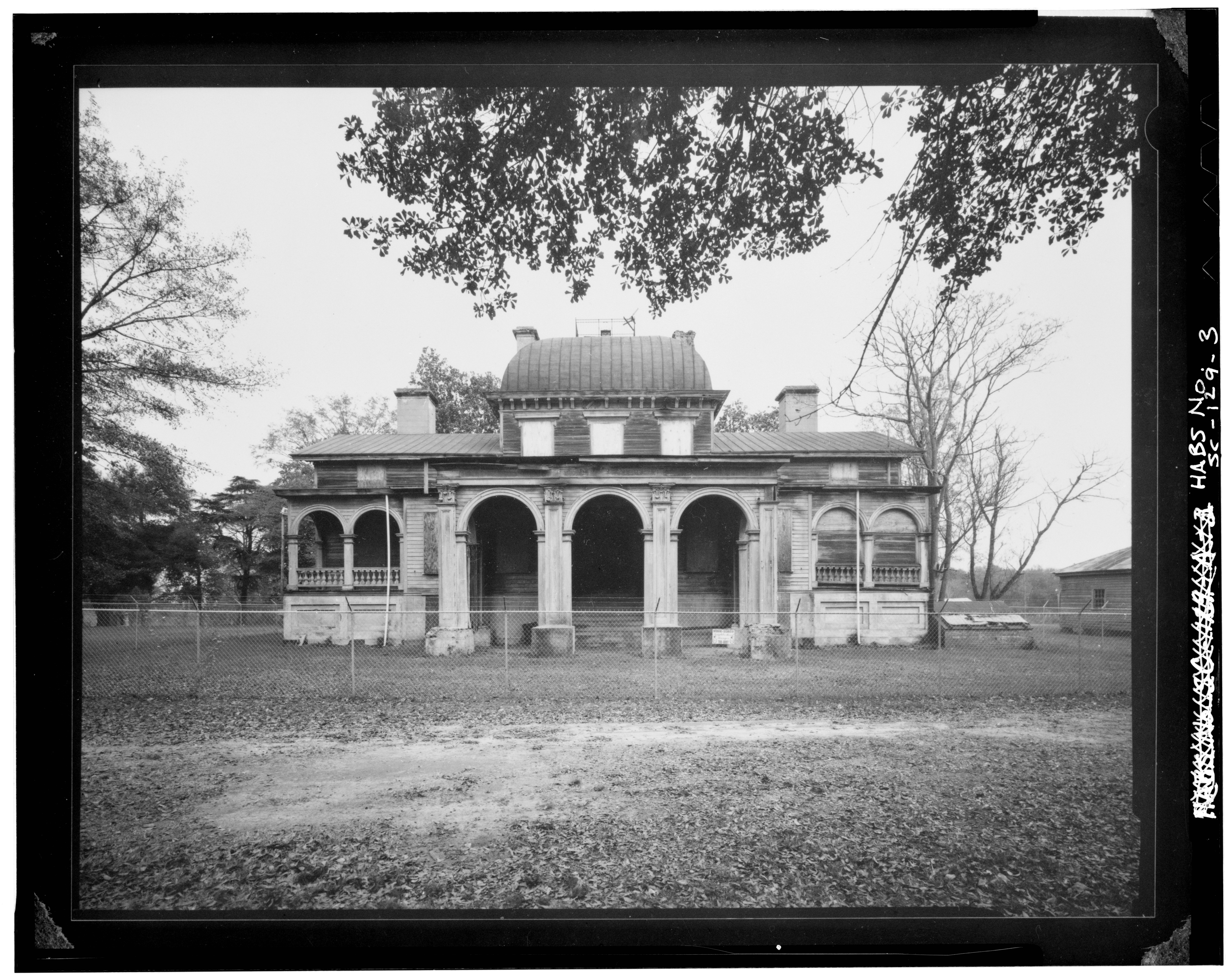
Kensington mansion prior to restoration

In 1910, Martha's son Richard sold his portion of the Kensington estate—including the mansion—to his friend Robert Pickett Hamer Jr. (1863–1912) for $75,000, though Robert Hamer never lived at Kensington. In 1912, he died of heat prostration, and Kensington Mansion passed to his 21-year-old son, Robert Cochrane Hamer (1890–1945). For the next 30 years, Robert Cochrane and his wife, Janie Porcher DuBose Hamer (1890–1969), lived in the mansion, adding indoor plumbing and electricity. In 1925, they purchased the remaining half of the original plantation from Cleland's nephew, Walter Taylor Green (1874–1927).

With his children grown and his health failing, Robert Cochrane Hamer sold the entirety of the 3,160 acre estate to the U.S. Government's Farm Security agency for $95,000 in 1941. With World War II preventing the government from using the land to resettle locals displaced by the Santee Cooper River project as intended, the land sat vacant until the government resold the property to the James Christie Lanham family for an estimated $61,000 in 1945. In the years to follow, the Lanham family began to use the land as a farm once again but never occupied the mansion. Instead, they used the building to store farm equipment and supplies.

In the 1960s, a group of preservation-minded citizens formed a committee to save the mansion, and in 1971, Kensington was added to the National Register of Historic Places. Despite the designation, Kensington remained in disrepair for another decade. In 1980, Triad Architectural Associates of Columbia was commissioned to compile architectural research on the site. During an interview, one of the architects, John Califf, recalled his first day on site: "There were pigeons flying all around...Up under the dome were snakes and dead animals and hay...and poop from all kinds of birds."

== Restoration ==
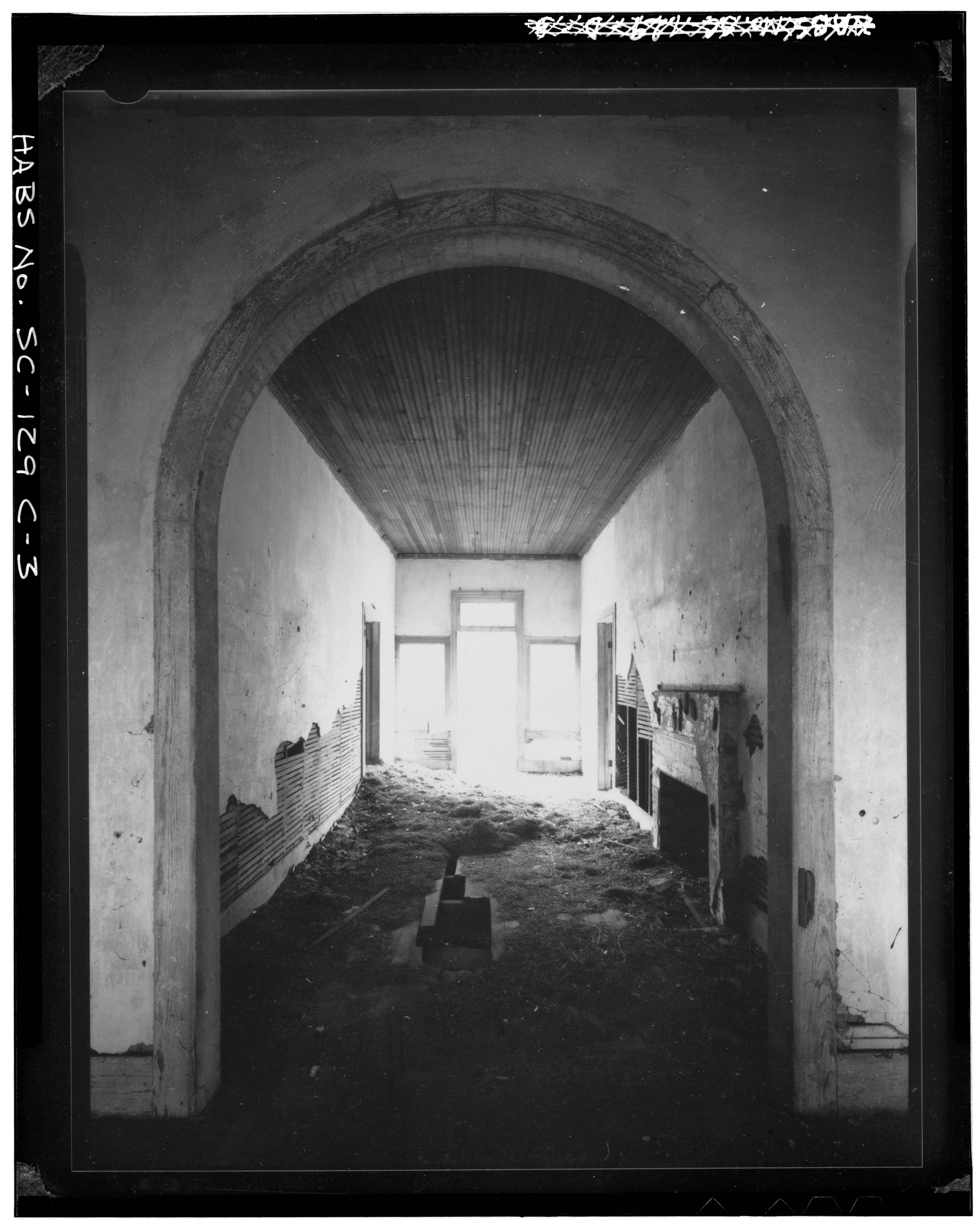
Kensington interior photographed as part of HABS survey

In 1981, Union Camp (later International Paper Company and Sylvamo) purchased the property from the Lanham family for an estimated $2.5 million. As part of their plan to build a paper mill nearby, Union Camp pledged to restore Kensington Mansion and invited the National Park Service to complete a Historic American Building Survey (abbreviated HABS). In 1982, Union Camp began the stabilization and restoration process with Ralph Boyd, a Union Camp engineer, serving as project director. Following the structural stabilization, he ensured that plans for water runoff were redesigned, new windowsills were installed, the entryway was replastered, the metal roof was replaced, the house was repainted, the balcony ironwork was restored, and an HVAC system was installed. Approximately $1 million later, the mansion officially opened to the public in 1985.

Not long after that, Robert Lee Scarborough, the grandson of Robert Pickett Hamer Jr., offered to loan his collection of antique furniture and decorative art to Union Camp as part of the site's museum interpretation. In 1996, the Scarborough-Hamer Foundation was formally established to support Union Camp's work at Kensington Mansion and was overseen by descendants of the Scarborough, Hamer, Singleton, and Stroyer families. The foundation ensured that tours were given four times a day on Thursdays, Fridays, and Saturdays for over two decades. Following water damage from an ice storm in February 2014, the Scarborough-Hamer Foundation discontinued tours and sent the majority of its collection to Seneca, South Carolina in 2016. The foundation has since dissolved.
