= Shepard S. Woodcock =

American architect

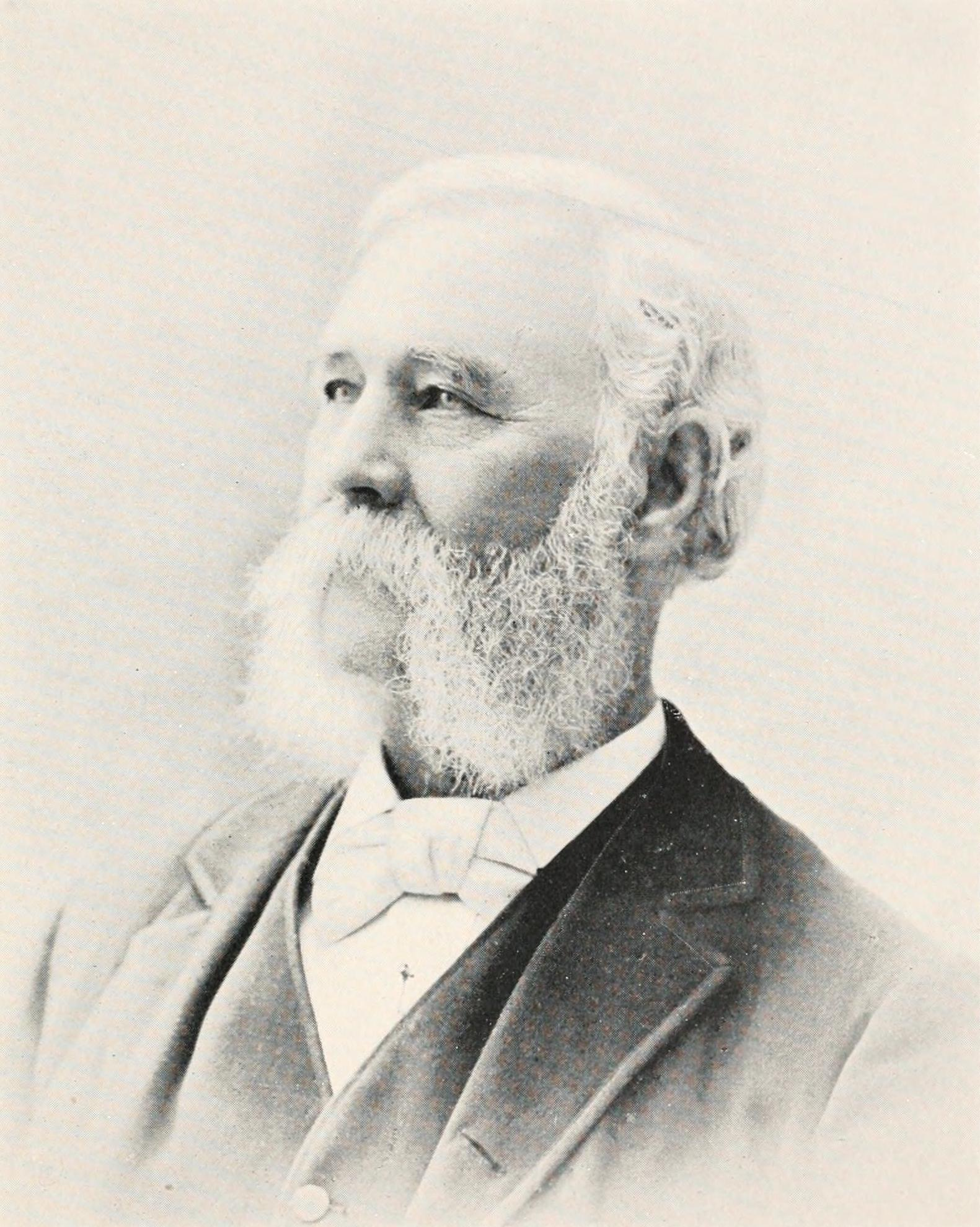
- Woodcock, c.1897
- Born: Shepard Sawtelle Woodcock; October 6, 1824; Sidney, Maine, US
- Died: March 2, 1910; Somerville, Massachusetts, US
- Occupation: Architect

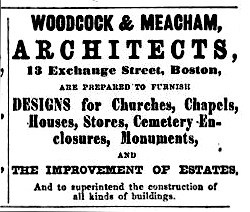
Advertisement for the firm of Woodcock & Meacham in the Boston Directory for 1862.

Shepard S. Woodcock (1824–1910) was an American architect practicing in Boston, Massachusetts during the second half of the nineteenth century.

== Early life and training ==
Shepard S. Woodcock was born on October 6, 1824, in Sidney, Maine. At the age of seventeen he went to Stow, Massachusetts to serve as an apprentice to a carpenter. After his apprenticeship ended, he moved to Boston, where he carried on the carpentry trade for more than ten years. During this period he studied architecture on his own time.

== Professional career ==
In 1854, Woodcock retired from the carpenter's trade and opened an architect's office in Boston. In 1857 he was joined by George F. Meacham, and they had formed a partnership by 1858. The firm of Woodcock & Meacham was dissolved in 1864, when Meacham opened his own office. Woodcock practiced independently for the remainder of his career. By 1888 his reputation was such that he was called as an expert witness in an inquiry into the construction of the High Service Pumping Station at Chestnut Hill. At this time he estimated that he had designed at least 140 churches. Indeed, the bulk of his identifiable projects are churches for Protestant denominations, though he was also responsible for town halls, libraries, schools, office and mercantile buildings, banks, private residences and monuments.

Woodcock was admitted to the Massachusetts Charitable Mechanic Association in 1857, and was an active member of the organization until his death. He was elected to fellowship in the Boston Society of Architects in 1867, which became affiliated with the American Institute of Architects in 1870. He resigned from the organization in 1877.

== Personal life ==
Woodcock was first married to Adeline Ryder, who died in 1850 at the age of 21. In the following year he married Julia Ann Swett, born in 1828 in Wales, Maine. They had at least seven children together, and she died in 1885. At his death he was survived by three daughters.

During the early phase of his career, Woodcock was a resident of Chelsea, Massachusetts. In the early 1860s he relocated to Somerville, where he remained until his death.

In addition to his professional affiliations, Woodcock was also a member of several Masonic and social organizations.

== Legacy ==
In addition to Meacham, other notable architects who worked in Woodcock's office include Alfred Stone (1855), John C. Cochrane (1862-1863) and Alberto F. Haynes (1871-1877 and 1883–1884).

At least eight of his works are individually listed on the United States National Register of Historic Places, and others contribute to listed historic districts.

== Architectural works ==
Year	Project	Address	City	State	Notes	Image	Reference
1854	Houses	20-22 Union Park St	Boston	Massachusetts			
1855	New Jerusalem Church	19 Centre Ave	Abington	Massachusetts	Demolished.		
1856	Mercantile building for Parker Fowle & Sons	350 Washington St	Boston	Massachusetts	Destroyed in the Great Boston Fire of 1872.		
1857	House for Clark Swallow	132 Whitman St	East Bridgewater	Massachusetts			
1857	Rockingham Bank Building	15 Pleasant St	Portsmouth	New Hampshire			
1858	Remodeling of the South Church of Portsmouth	292 State St	Portsmouth	New Hampshire	NRHP-listed.		
1859	Williams School	180 Walnut St	Chelsea	Massachusetts	Designed while in partnership with George F. Meacham. Destroyed in the Great Chelsea fire of 1908.		
1860	Tremont Street Methodist Church (former)	720 Tremont St	Boston	Massachusetts	Designed while in partnership with George F. Meacham. Hammatt Billings was consulting architect, and to him the exterior design is attributed.		
1864	Ladd and Whitney Monument	Monument Square	Lowell	Massachusetts	Designed while in partnership with George F. Meacham.		
1864	Perry House	11 Touro St	Newport	Rhode Island	Designed while in partnership with George F. Meacham. Demolished.		
1864	Bank of Cape Ann Building	154 Main St	Gloucester	Massachusetts	Designed while in partnership with George F. Meacham. Later the Cape Ann National Bank. Demolished.		
1865	E Street Church	309 E St	Boston	Massachusetts	Later known as Dahlgren Hall after the congregation dissolved. The building has been largely demolished, but the lower level remains as part of the building now on the site.		
1865	State Street Baptist Church	171 State St	Springfield	Massachusetts	Demolished in 1927.		
1866	First Baptist Church of Cambridge	5 Magazine St	Cambridge	Massachusetts	Burned in 1881.		
1866	Lincoln School	40 College Ave	Somerville	Massachusetts	Demolished.		
1866	Massachusetts Mutual Life Insurance Company Building	1341 Main St	Springfield	Massachusetts	Demolished.		
1866	Remodeling of the North Avenue Congregational Church (former)	1801 Massachusetts Ave	Cambridge	Massachusetts	After the church was relocated, Woodcock was responsible for the addition of transepts. NRHP-listed.		
1866	Soldiers' Monument	Natick Common	Natick	Massachusetts			
1866	Unitarian Church of Winchendon	126 Central St	Winchendon	Massachusetts			
1866	Warren Avenue Baptist Church	173 W Canton St	Boston	Massachusetts	The church was the base of Thomas W. Piper, a serial killer. Woodcock was called as a witness during Piper's trial in 1876. Demolished in 1968.		
1867	First Orthodox Congregational Church of Somerville	21 Franklin St	Somerville	Massachusetts	Woodcock was a member of this church for much of his adult life. Demolished.		
1867	Lodge Mausoleum, Mount Auburn Cemetery	580 Mount Auburn St	Cambridge	Massachusetts	Built by Anna Cabot Lodge as the resting place of her family, including her son Henry Cabot Lodge.		
1867	Prescott School	75 Myrtle St	Somerville	Massachusetts	Demolished.		
1867	Unitarian Church of Ellsworth	216 Main St	Ellsworth	Maine	Demolished.		
1868	Brookfield Town Hall	6 Central St	Brookfield	Massachusetts	Demolished.		
1868	Carter School	10 Forsyth St	Chelsea	Massachusetts	Demolished.		
1868	First Baptist Church of Scituate	656 Country Way	Scituate	Massachusetts	NRHP-listed.		
1868	Grace Methodist Church	34 Court St	Keene	New Hampshire	NRHP-listed.		
1869	First Baptist Church of Lebanon	11 School St	Lebanon	New Hampshire	Burned in 2016.		
1869	Wesleyan Methodist Church of St. Stephen	70 King St	St. Stephen	New Brunswick	Later the Kirk McColl United Church. Burned.		
1870	Central Fire Station	Highland Ave and Walnut St	Somerville	Massachusetts	Demolished.		
1870	First Church in Malden	184 Pleasant St	Malden	Massachusetts	Demolished		
1870	Marlborough Town Hall	140 Main St	Marlborough	Massachusetts	Burned in 1902.		
1870	Methodist Church of Westford	10 Church St	Graniteville	Massachusetts	NRHP-listed as part of the Graniteville Historic District.		
1871	Edgerly School	33 Cross St	Somerville	Massachusetts	Demolished.		
1872	Christ Episcopal Church (former)	10 Henry St	Port Henry	New York			
1872	First Congregational Church of Litchfield	21 Torrington Rd	Litchfield	Connecticut	Demolished in 1929.		
1872	Grace Episcopal Church	104 N Washington St	North Attleborough	Massachusetts	Burned in 1929.		
1872	Holbrook Town Hall	50 N Franklin St	Holbrook	Massachusetts	Burned in 1878.		
1872	Houses for Adoniram Burrell	47-53 M St	Boston	Massachusetts			
1872	Hudson Town Hall	78 Main St	Hudson	Massachusetts			
1872	Remodeling of the Kirk Street Congregational Church	Kirk and French Sts	Lowell	Massachusetts	Replacement of the facade and interior renovation. Demolished.		
1872	Trinity Episcopal Church	47 East St	Wrentham	Massachusetts			
1873	First Baptist Church of Keene	Court and Vernon Sts	Keene	New Hampshire	Demolished.		
1873	Masonic Building	117 Merrimack St	Haverhill	Massachusetts			
1873	North Bennington Congregational Church	8 Bank St	North Bennington	Vermont			
1874	Clark's Block	1-23 Main St	Natick	Massachusetts			
1874	Bell School	Vinal Ave and Summer St	Somerville	Massachusetts	Demolished.		
1874	Eliot Church	273 Summer St	Lowell	Massachusetts			
1874	Masonic Block	24 Main St	Natick	Massachusetts			
1875	First Congregational Church of Natick	2 E Central St	Natick	Massachusetts			
1875	Howard Seminary	70 Howard St	West Bridgewater	Massachusetts	Burned in 1949.		
1876	House for Frederick Ayer	357 Pawtucket St	Lowell	Massachusetts	Later the Franco-American School.		
1876	Keene High School (former)	Winter and Middle Sts	Keene	New Hampshire	Demolished.		
1877	Franklin School	363 Broad St	Weymouth	Massachusetts	Demolished.		
1879	Livery stable for Alfred Papineau	180 Green St	Jamaica Plain	Massachusetts			
1879	The Tabernacle	80 Trinity Park	Oak Bluffs	Massachusetts			
1880	Mercantile building for A. P. Morse and H. B. Taylor	215-237 Franklin St	Boston	Massachusetts	Demolished.		
1881	Hunt School	45 Broad St	Weymouth	Massachusetts	Demolished.		
1881	Shedd Free Library	47 N Main St	Washington	New Hampshire			
1883	Sanborn Seminary (former)	178 Main St	Kingston	New Hampshire	NRHP-listed.		
1885	Hebronville School (former)	Knight Ave and Webber St	Attleboro	Massachusetts	Demolished.		
1885	South Attleboro School (former)	437 Newport Ave	Attleboro	Massachusetts			
1885	St. Philip Episcopal Church	65 Union St	Easthampton	Massachusetts	Demolished.		
1887	House for Dominick A. Hart	45 Hunt St	Weymouth	Massachusetts			
1887	Washington School (former)	8 School St	Weymouth	Massachusetts	NRHP-listed.		
1888	House for George F. Eames	57 Mount Vernon St	West Roxbury	Massachusetts			
1888	House for James P. Fairchild	41 Maple St	Stoneham	Massachusetts	Identical to the house for Henry A. Hill.		
1888	House for Henry A. Hill	3 Cedar Ave	Stoneham	Massachusetts	Identical to the house for James P. Fairchild.		
1888	Rice Public Library	8 Wentworth St	Kittery	Maine	NRHP-listed.		
1888	School Street School (former)	100 Webster St	Whitman	Massachusetts	Later known as the Hunt School. Burned in 1983.		
1889	Addition to building for the Reversible Collar Company	12-14 Arrow St	Cambridge	Massachusetts	Addition of the wing along Arrow Street. NRHP-listed.		
1889	Central Baptist Church	3 Nickerson Ave	Middleborough	Massachusetts	Demolished in 1963.		
1889	Jefferson School (former)	200 Middle St	Weymouth	Massachusetts	NRHP-listed. Also a contributing property to the Central Square Historic District.		
1890	Memorial Hall	1027 Washington St	Abington	Massachusetts			
1890	Tufts Library (former)	60 Washington St	Weymouth	Massachusetts	Demolished.		
1891	Horace Mann High School (former)	150 Emmons St	Franklin	Massachusetts	Demolished in 2016.		
1892	House for Julius W. Tilson	187 Summer St	Malden	Massachusetts			
1892	House for Walter H. Wright	54 Vinal Ave	Somerville	Massachusetts	NRHP-listed.		
1893	House for Frank H. Chamberlain	25 Pleasant St	Hudson	Massachusetts			
1895	House for William H. Wentworth	121 Raymond St	Cambridge	Massachusetts			
1896	House for Henry E. Wright	31 Pearl St	Somerville	Massachusetts			

== See also ==
- O.P. Woodcock
