= Henry Golding (disambiguation) =

Henry Golding (born 1987) is a British/Malaysian actor.

Henry Golding may also refer to:

- Henry Golding (died 1576), MP for Colchester and Maldon
- Henry Golding (died 1593), MP for Callington

== See also ==
- Henry Goulding House, an historic house in Massachusetts
