= W. H. Goulding House =

Historic house in Massachusetts, United States

- W.H. Goulding House
- U.S. National Register of Historic Places
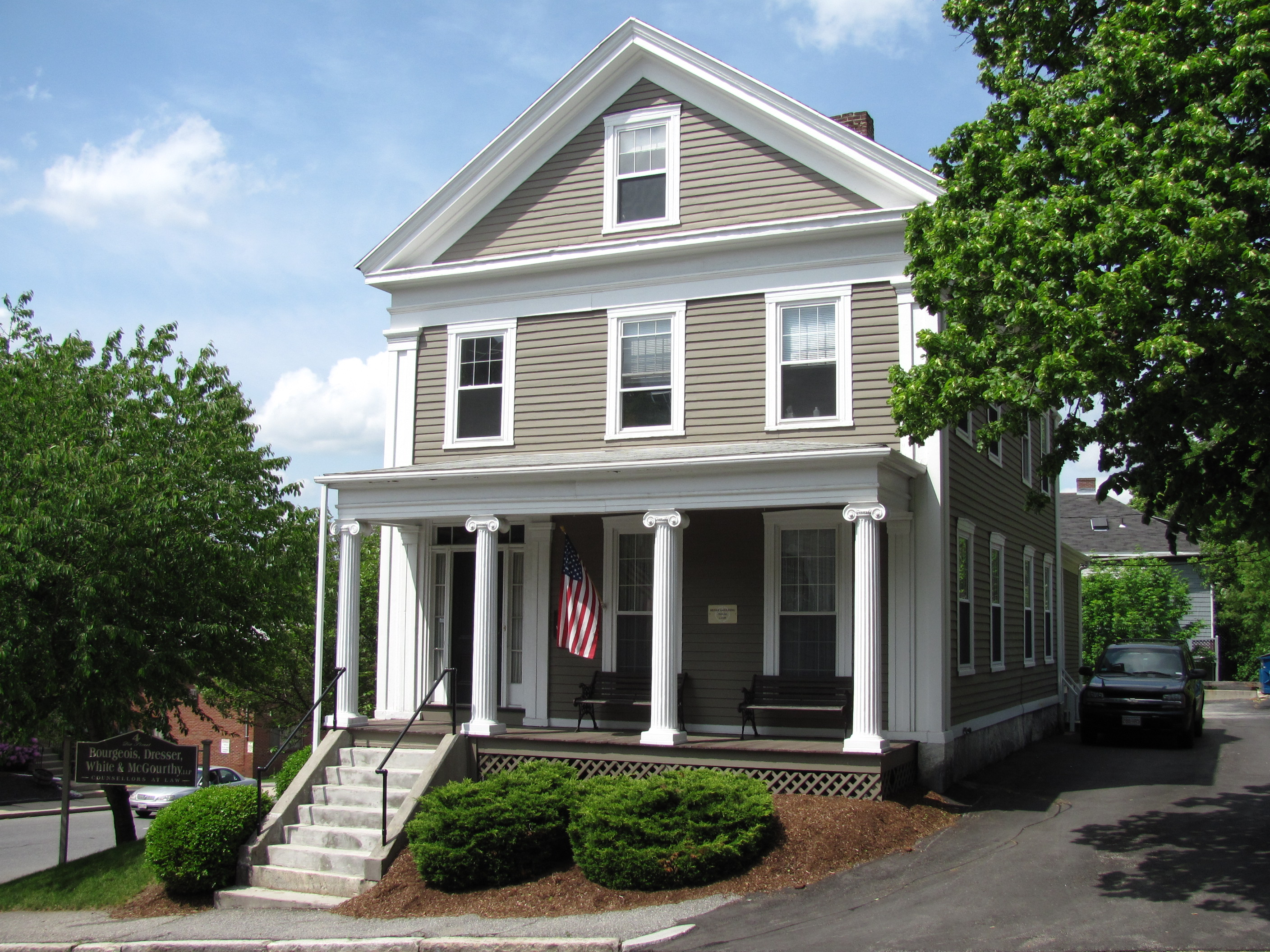
- W.H. Goulding House

- Location within Massachusetts Location within the United States
- Location: 4 Dix St., Worcester, Massachusetts
- Coordinates: 42°16′10″N 71°48′12″W
- Area: less than one acre
- Built: c. 1849
- Architectural style: Greek Revival
- MPS: Worcester MRA
- NRHP reference No.: 80000566
- Added to NRHP: March 5, 1980

The W. H. Goulding House is an historic house in Worcester, Massachusetts, United States. Built sometime before 1849 for Henry Goulding, a local industrialist, it is a good local example of Greek Revival architecture. It was moved by Goulding in 1850 to make way for a more opulent Italianate house. The house was listed on the National Register of Historic Places in 1980.

== Description and history ==
The W.H. Goulding House is located north of downtown Worcester, at the northeast corner of Dix and Lancaster Streets. It is a 2 1/2-story wood-frame structure, with a gabled roof and clapboarded exterior. Its main facade is three bays wide, with the entrance in the leftmost bay, flanked by sidelight windows and pilasters, and topped by a transom window. The front porch extends across the entire front, its hip roof supported by fluted Doric columns. Ground floor windows on the front are elongated in the Greek Revival style, and the building corners have paneled pilasters rising to an entablature.

The house was built sometime between 1847 and 1849, and was originally located at 26 Harvard Street. The owner was Henry Goulding, owner of some of Worcester's largest industrial businesses and founder of the Worcester Mechanics' Association. In 1850 Goulding moved the house to its present location so that he could build a more opulent Italianate house on that site, and sold it the same year.

== See also ==
- National Register of Historic Places listings in northwestern Worcester, Massachusetts
- National Register of Historic Places listings in Worcester County, Massachusetts
