= Reversible Collar Company Building =

- U.S. National Register of Historic Places
- U.S. Historic district – Contributing property
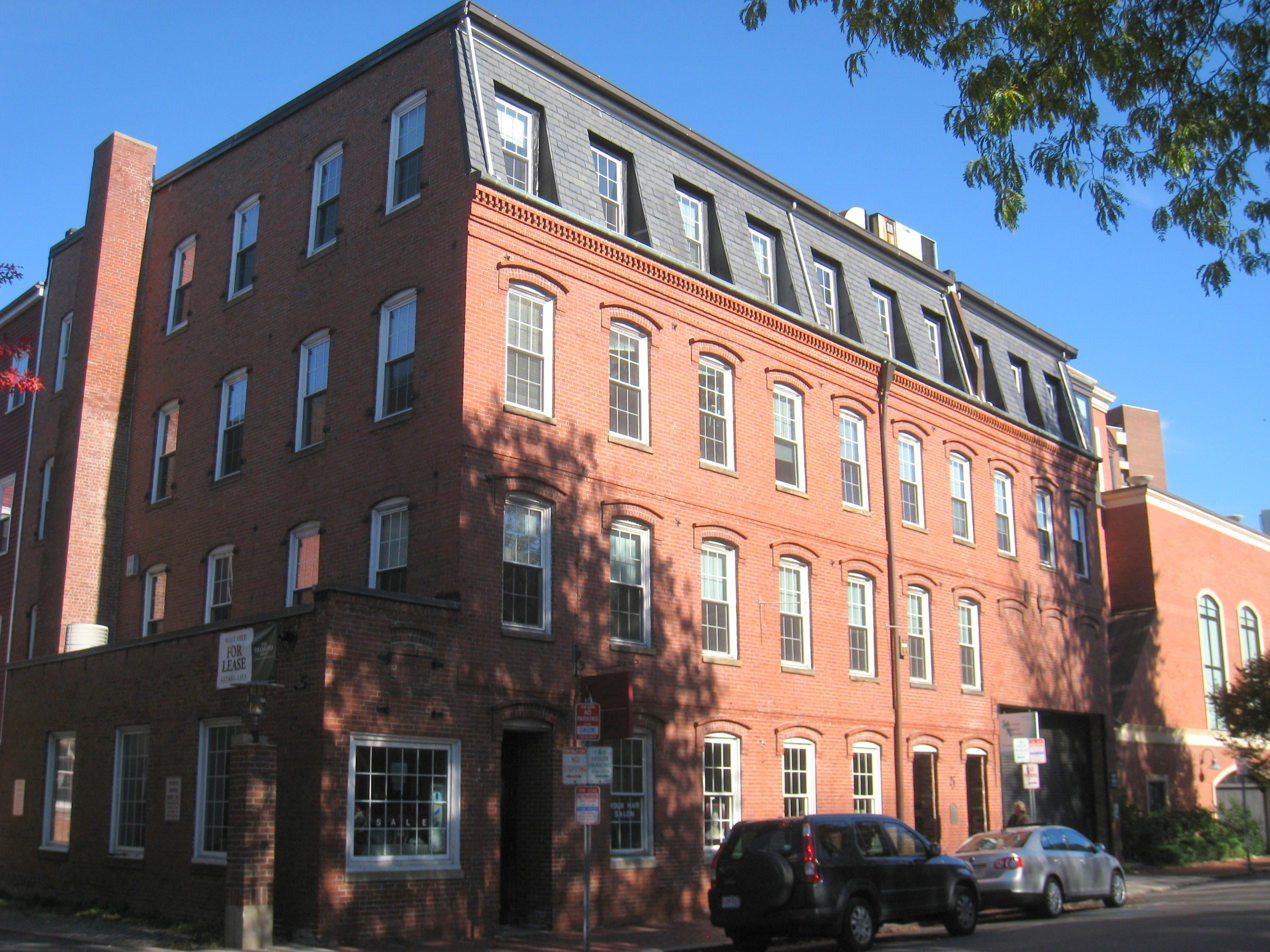

- Location within Massachusetts Location within the United States
- Location: Cambridge, Massachusetts
- Coordinates: 42°22′15″N 71°6′53.5″W
- Architect: Shepard S. Woodcock; Charles Gannett
- Architectural style: Second Empire
- Part of: Harvard Square Historic District (ID86003654)
- MPS: Cambridge MRA
- NRHP reference No.: 85002663

Significant dates
- Added to NRHP: September 27, 1985
- Designated CP: July 28, 1988

The Reversible Collar Company Building is a historic factory building at 25–27 Mt. Auburn & 10–14 Arrow Streets in Cambridge, Massachusetts. The building has a complex construction history, consisting of several buildings constructed separately between 1862 and 1907, and gradually combined into a single structure. The oldest portions were built by Allen and Farnham, a printing business. The property was sold to the Reversible Collar Company in 1867, which expanded the facility. The company at first manufactured paper shirt collars, but later also produced paper and paper-fabric combinations for use in products like wall charts and maps. The buildings on the site were sold to the Boston Bookbinding Company in 1897. In the late-1960s the building was converted to office and commercial space.

The building was listed on the National Register of Historic Places in 1985, and included in an expansion of the Harvard Square Historic District in 1988.

== See also ==
- National Register of Historic Places listings in Cambridge, Massachusetts
