= Grace United Methodist Church (Keene, New Hampshire) =

Historic church in New Hampshire, United States

- U.S. National Register of Historic Places
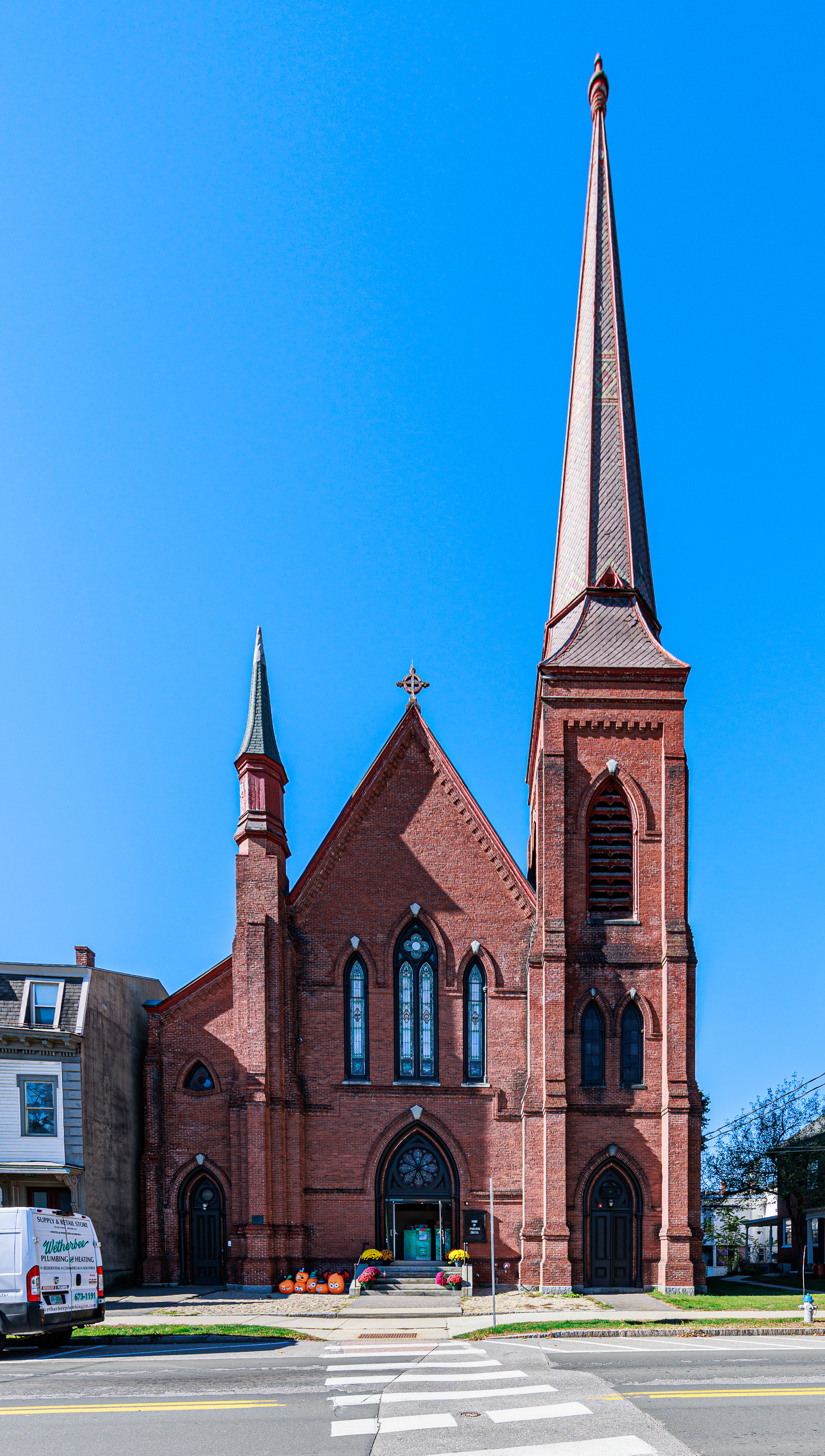
- Grace United Methodist Church

- Location within New Hampshire Location within the United States
- Location: 34 Court St., Keene, New Hampshire
- Coordinates: 42°56′7″N 72°16′48″W
- Area: 0.2 acres (0.081 ha)
- Built: 1869
- Architect: Woodcock, Shepard S.
- Architectural style: Gothic, High Victorian Gothic
- NRHP reference No.: 85000476
- Added to NRHP: March 07, 1985

Grace United Methodist Church is a former Methodist Church building at 34 Court Street in Keene, New Hampshire. Built in 1869, it was designed by architect Shepard S. Woodcock, and is one of the largest churches in southwestern New Hampshire. It was added to the National Register of Historic Places in 1985. Its congregation moved in 2009 and was disbanded in 2016. Since 2018 the church has been owned by a marketing agency.

== Description and history ==
The former Grace United Methodist Church is in downtown Keene, a short way north of Central Square on the west side of Court Street. It is a large brick building with Gothic Revival styling. It has a gabled roof, with buttressing along the sides and at the corners. A tower with a tall spire rises from the right front corner, with a polychrome slate finish. There are three entrances on the main facade, one in the tower, one at the center below the main gable, and one to the left of a buttressed turret. The interior is two stories, with classrooms, vestry, and office spaces on the ground floor, and the main sanctuary on the second floor.

The Grace congregation was founded in 1832, and built its first house of worship in 1852. This church was built in 1868-69, to a design by Shepard S. Woodcock, a prolific regional architect working out of Boston, Massachusetts. It was built at the high cost of $40,000, beyond the means of its parishioners to afford; the congregation was in debt until 1896. Originally roofed in polychrome slate (similar to what appears on the spire), the roof was replaced after the 1938 New England Hurricane.

Due to dwindling enrollment, the Methodist congregation moved to rent smaller quarters in the Odd Fellows Hall on Marlboro Street, and was formally disbanded in 2016. The historic church's Steer and Turner organ was removed and sold to a German Catholic church.

The building was purchased in 2018 by the owner of a local digital marketing agency.

== See also ==
- National Register of Historic Places listings in Cheshire County, New Hampshire
