= Merrill G. Wheelock =

American architect

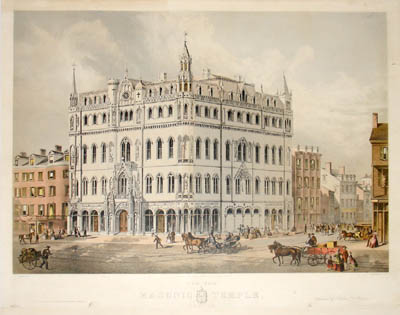
Masonic Temple (built 1867), corner Boylston Street and Tremont Street, Boston; designed by M.G. Wheelock

Merrill Greene Wheelock (1822–1866) was an artist and architect in Boston, Massachusetts in the 19th century. He served in the Massachusetts infantry in the American Civil War.

== Biography ==
Wheelock exhibited at the Boston Art Club (1857) and the Boston Athenaeum. Among his early supporters was James Elliot Cabot. Wheelock was especially known for watercolors: he "has a local reputation of being our best painter in that department, his pictures being full of brilliant color." In 1852 he kept a studio on Tremont Row, and in 1858 on Summer Street.

In 1865 Wheelock designed the architecture of Boston's new Masonic Temple, which would move a few blocks down Tremont Street, from Temple Place to the corner of Boylston Street. Illness prevented him from completing the design, finished by architect George F. Meacham and built in 1867.

One of Wheelock's watercolor landscape paintings appeared in the 1881 exhibit of the Boston Art Club. A contemporary reviewer commented: "Wheelock is almost forgotten, although it is not so very many years since he died. But this watercolor shows that he has well-grounded claims upon our remembrance. It will certainly be better for his fame to know him by his paintings, than by such architectural absurdities as the Masonic Temple."

== Image gallery ==
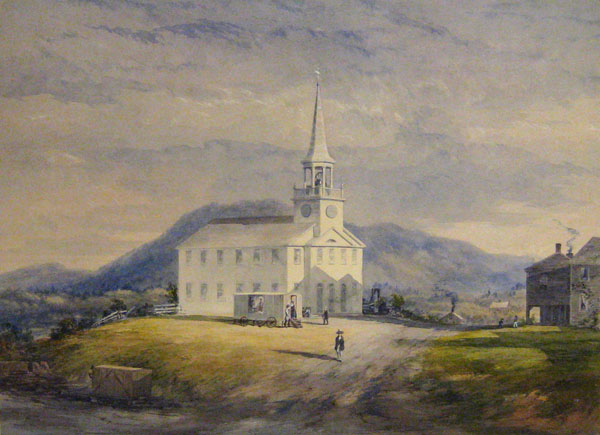
Watercolor, 19th century (American Antiquarian Society)

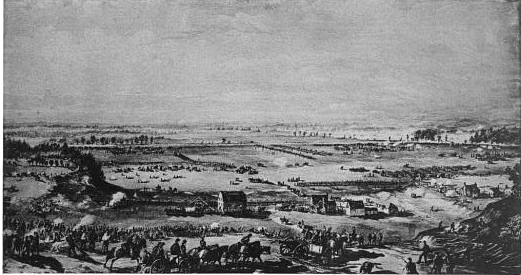
Battle of Goldsborough Bridge, North Carolina, 1862

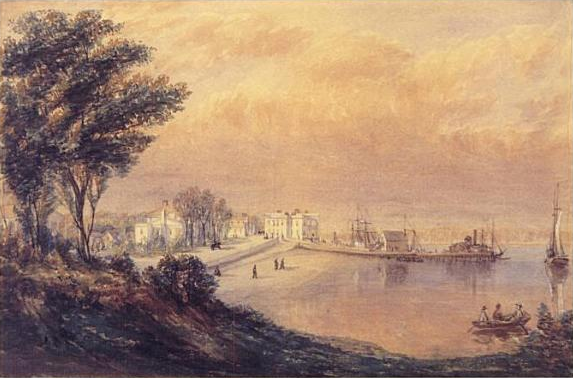
View of a southern city, 1862-1863

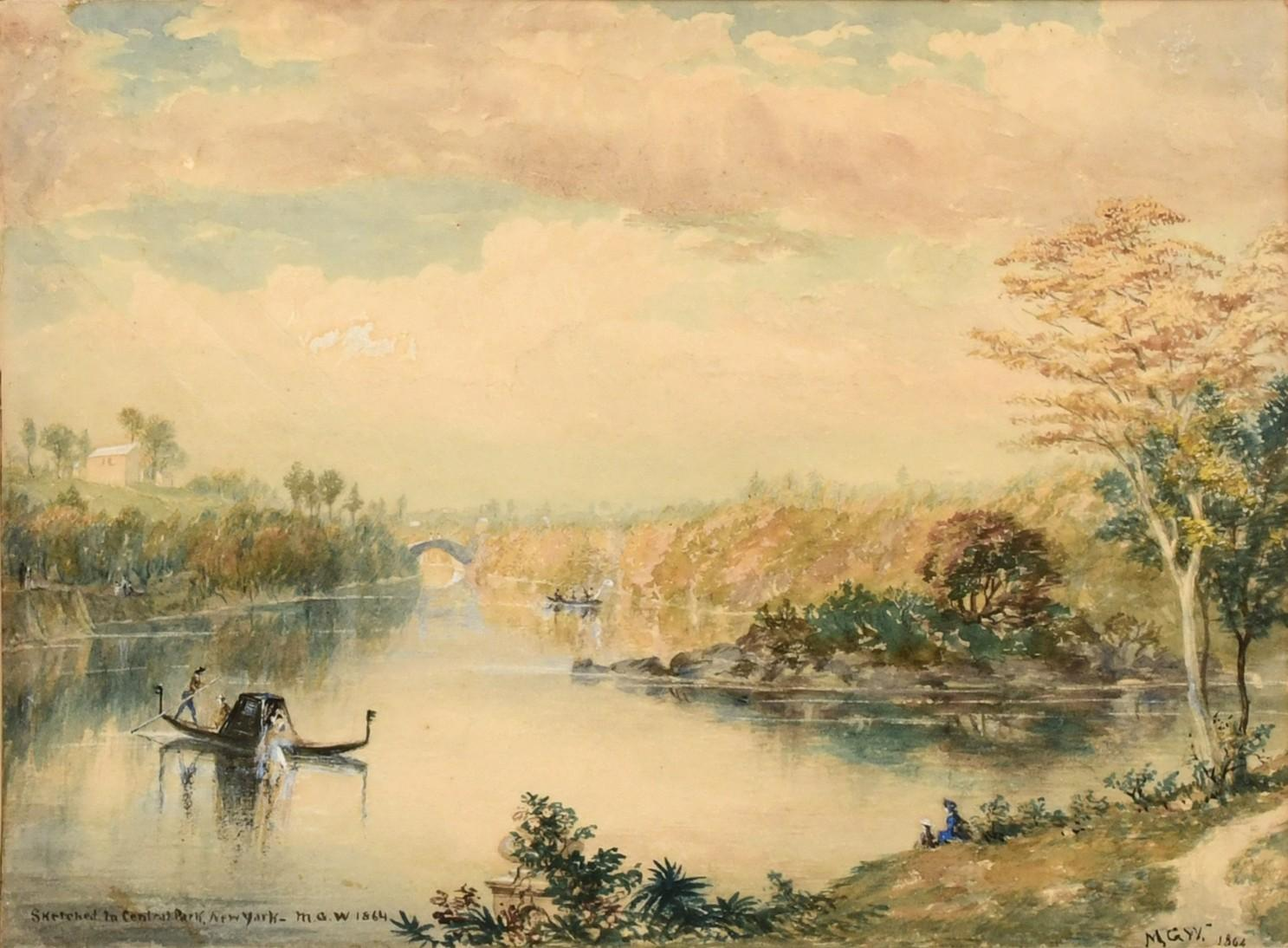
Watercolor sketch. Central Park, NY, 1864

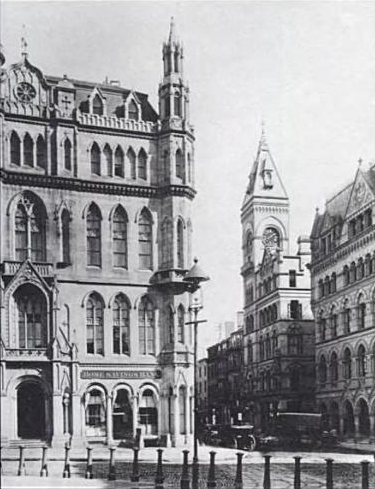
Masonic Temple, Boylston Street, Boston, c. 1878

== See also ==
- Henry Goulding House, Worcester, Mass. (built 1850)
