= Wright House (Somerville, Massachusetts) =

Historic house in Massachusetts, United States

- U.S. National Register of Historic Places
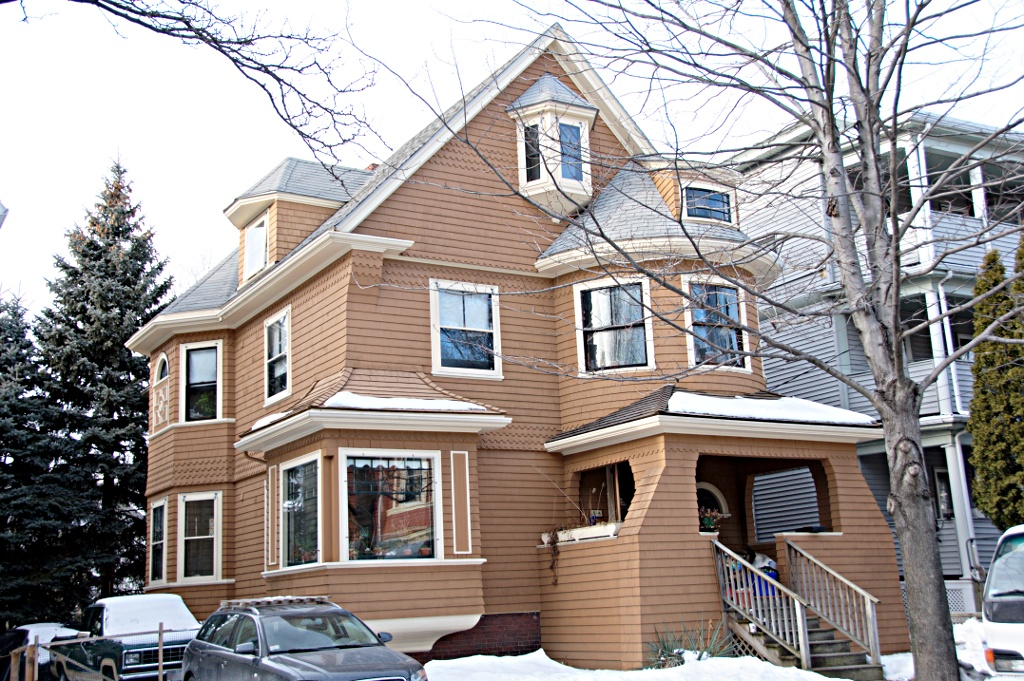

- Location within Massachusetts Location within the United States
- Location: Somerville, Massachusetts
- Coordinates: 42°23′6.50″N 71°5′48.59″W
- Built: 1892
- Architect: Shepard S. Woodcock
- Architectural style: Queen Anne, Shingle Style
- MPS: Somerville MPS
- NRHP reference No.: 89001293
- Added to NRHP: September 18, 1989

The Wright House is a historic house at 54 Vinal Avenue in Somerville, Massachusetts. The 2 1/2-story wood-frame house was built in 1892 for Walter H. Wright, owner of a milk can manufacturer. It is predominantly Queen Anne style in its massing, with numerous projecting bays, including a turret-like section over the single-story front porch. Most of its architectural elements, however, are shingled, and there are bands of decorative cut shingles in various places. Shepard S. Woodcock was the architect.

The house was listed on the National Register of Historic Places in 1989.

== See also ==
- National Register of Historic Places listings in Somerville, Massachusetts
