= Eliot Congregational Church =

Historic church in Massachusetts, United States

- U.S. National Register of Historic Places
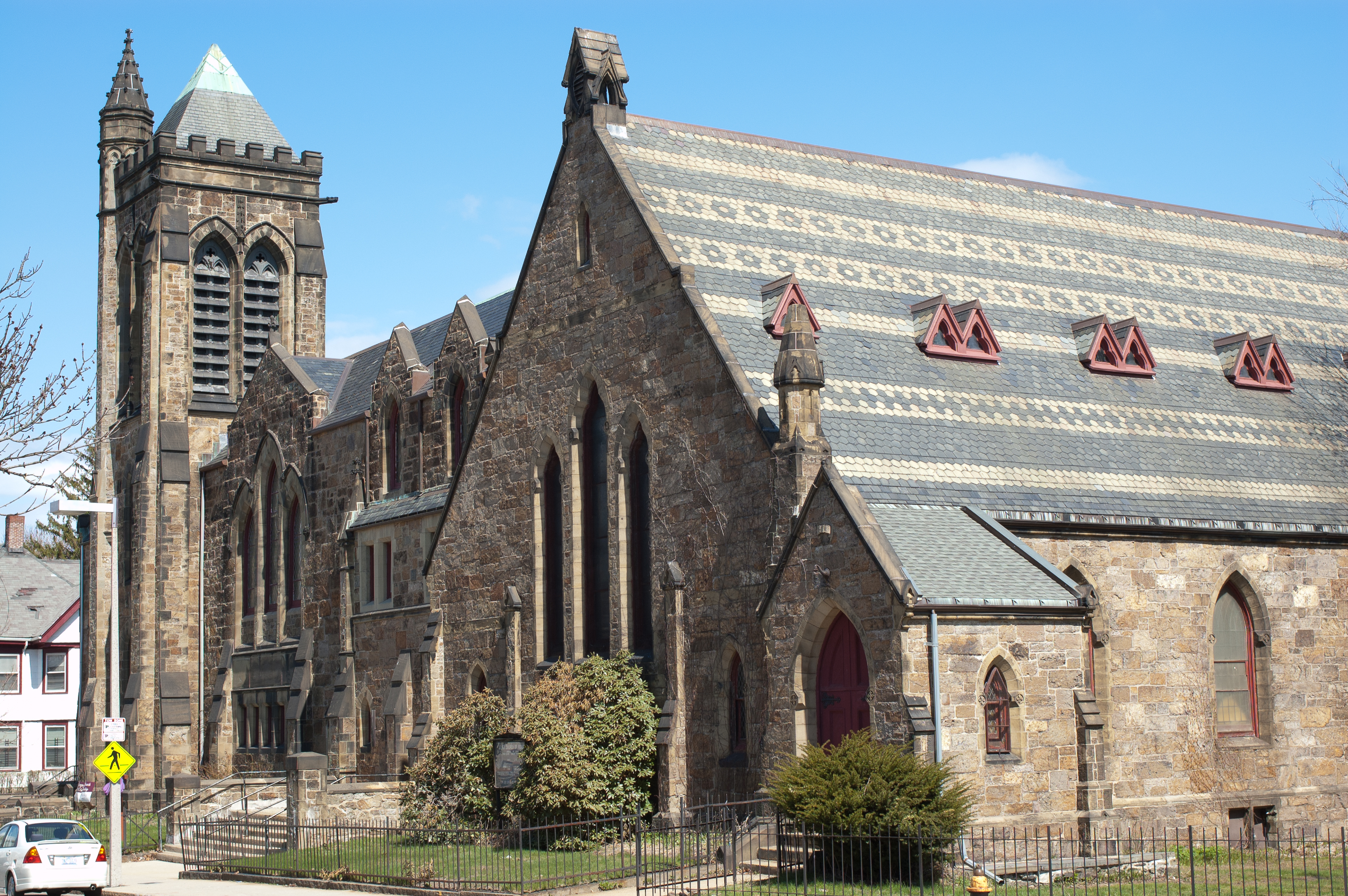
- Eliot Congregational Church, 2011

- Location within Massachusetts Location within the United States
- Location: Boston, Massachusetts
- Coordinates: 42°19′10″N 71°4′55″W
- Built: 1873; 1889; 1908; 1931
- Built by: S. M. Chesley & Company and Robert Culbert (1873); L. E. Giddings (1889)
- Architect: George F. Meacham (1873); J. Williams Beal (1889)
- Architectural style: High Victorian Gothic
- NRHP reference No.: 93001587
- Added to NRHP: February 9, 1994

The Eliot Congregational Church is a historic Congregational church at 56 Dale Street, at the corner of Walnut Avenue in the Roxbury neighborhood of Boston, Massachusetts.

== History and architecture ==
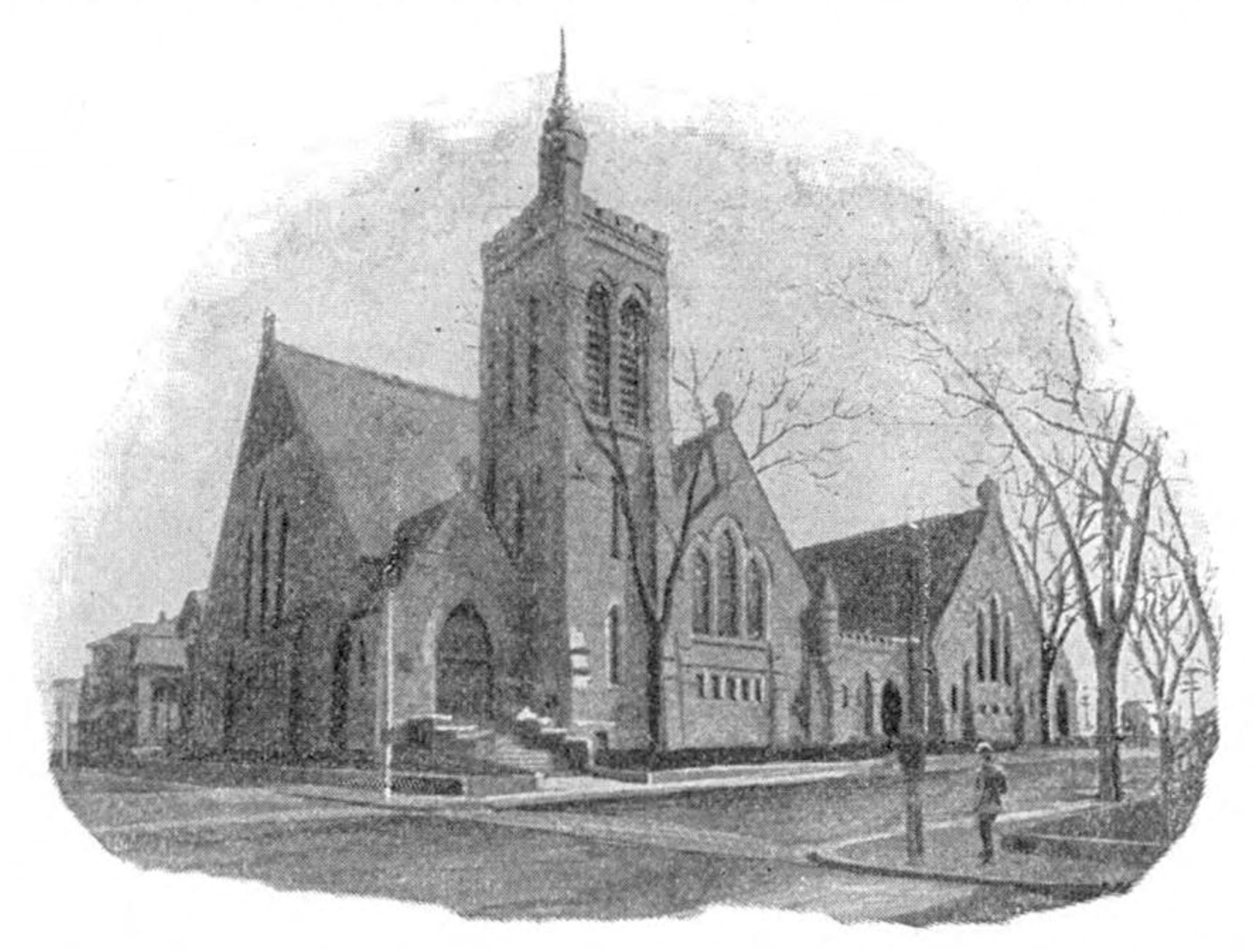
The Walnut Avenue Congregational Church, depicted circa 1895.

The Walnut Avenue Congregational Church was originally established in 1870 as an offshoot of the Eliot Congregational Church, of Kenilworth Street. The original church building was designed by George F. Meacham and built in 1873 by carpenters S. M. Chesley & Company and mason Robert Culbert. The building also contained frescoes by artist William S. Brazer. This first church was planned to be used as a chapel after the construction of a main sanctuary. It is built of Roxbury puddingstone and designed in what is now referred to as the High Victorian Gothic style, though in 1873 it was described as "Decorated" Gothic, after the second style of English Gothic architecture.

This main sanctuary, designed by J. Williams Beal and built by L. E. Giddings, was added in 1889. In 1907, Walnut Avenue merged with the Immanuel Congregational Church at the Walnut Avenue location, under the name Immanuel-Walnut Avenue Congregational Church. In 1908 a two-story parish house was added, now forming the church's rear wing. In 1922, facing a declining congregation, the Immanuel-Walnut Avenue church merged with its parent church, again at the Walnut Avenue location, as the Eliot Congregational Church, where it remains. In November 1929 a fire gutted the 1889 building, leaving only the tower and exterior walls standing. The church decided to use the 1873 building as its main sanctuary, rebuilding the 1889 building as a parish house and gymnasium. This work was completed in 1931.

The 1873 building has a stained glass window manufactured by the studio of Louis Comfort Tiffany, which was designed by Frederick Wilson and installed in 1905. The space also includes a circa 1931 window designed by Charles Jay Connick. In Immanuel Hall, in the parish house, is another Tiffany window. This was originally installed in the Immanuel Congregational Church, and moved to its current site when the congregations merged.

The building was listed on the National Register of Historic Places in 1994.

Notable past pastors include Conrad Tillard. The present pastor is an interim pastor, Rev. Andrew Kimble.

== See also ==
- National Register of Historic Places listings in southern Boston, Massachusetts
