= John Phillip Rilley =

John Phillip Riley
- Born: January 22, 1877; Allentown, Pennsylvania, US
- Died: November 16, 1950 (aged 73); Salem, Massachusetts, US
- Burial place: Greenlawn Cemetery Salem, Massachusetts
- Military career
- Allegiance: United States of America
- Branch: United States Navy
- Rank: Landsman
- Unit: U.S.S. Nashville
- Conflicts: Spanish–American War
- Awards: Medal of Honor

John Phillip Rilley or Riley (January 22, 1877 – November 16, 1950) was a landsman serving in the United States Navy during the Spanish–American War who received the Medal of Honor for bravery.

== Biography ==
Riley was born January 22, 1877, in Allentown, Pennsylvania and after entering the navy was sent to fight in the Spanish–American War aboard the U.S.S. Nashville as a landsman.

He died on November 16, 1950, and is buried in Greenlawn Cemetery in Salem, Massachusetts.

== Medal of Honor citation ==
Rank and organization: Landsman, U.S. Navy. Born: 22 January 1877, Allentown, Pa. Accredited to: Massachusetts. G.O. No.: 521, July 1899.

Citation:

On board the U.S.S. Nashville during the operation of cutting the cable leading from Cienfuegos, Cuba, 11 May 1898. Facing the heavy fire of the enemy, Riley displayed extraordinary bravery and coolness throughout this action.

== See also ==
- List of Medal of Honor recipients for the Spanish–American War
