= Rice Public Library =

- U.S. National Register of Historic Places
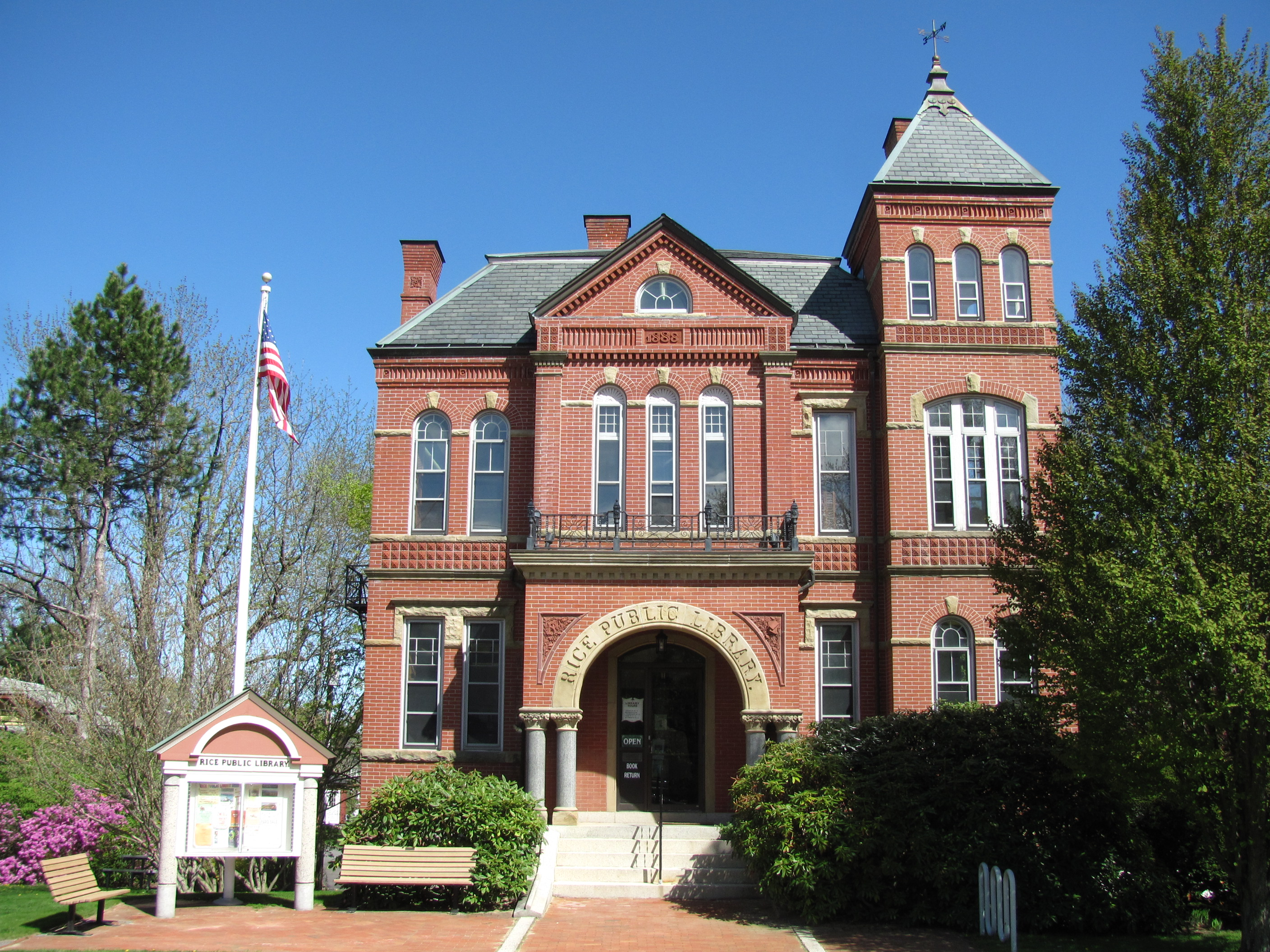

- Location within Maine Location within the United States
- Location: 8 Wentworth St., Kittery, Maine
- Coordinates: 43°5′12″N 70°44′34″W
- Area: 0.5 acres (0.20 ha)
- Built: 1889
- Built by: A. S. Giddings
- Architect: Shepard S. Woodcock
- Architectural style: Romanesque Revival
- NRHP reference No.: 79000190
- Added to NRHP: October 1, 1979

The Rice Public Library is the public library of Kittery, Maine. It is located at 8 Wentworth Street (Maine State Route 103) in the central Kittery Foreside village, in an architecturally distinguished Romanesque Revival building built in 1889 and listed on the National Register of Historic Places in 1979, with a large annex just across the street at 2 Walker Street.

== Architecture and history ==
The Rice Building is located on the east side of Wentworth Street, a short way north of the main entrance to the Portsmouth Naval Shipyard. It is a two-story structure, built primarily out of Philadelphia brick, with granite trim. It has a hip roof, three-story tower on the right, and a main entrance set recessed under a round arch in a projecting gable section near the center of the front facade. A granite string course separates the basement from the first floor, and a band of ornamental brick separates the first and second floors.

The library was established by a bequest from Arabella Rice, whose 1867 will left funds for the establishment of a library in Kittery in honor of her father, a Kittery native. A board of trustees was formed in 1875, three years after her death, and this building was completed in 1889. It was designed by Boston architect Shepard S. Woodcock, and is his only known surviving commission in the state. The building is also one of only two two-story Romanesque libraries in the state (the other is the Skowhegan Free Public Library). When first opened, its upper level housed a museum and meeting space, which was used by the Grand Army of the Republic.

After a $6.1 million renovation, the library reopened in 2022.

== See also ==
- National Register of Historic Places listings in York County, Maine
