= South Congregational Church (New Britain, Connecticut) =

Historic church in Connecticut, United States

- U.S. National Register of Historic Places
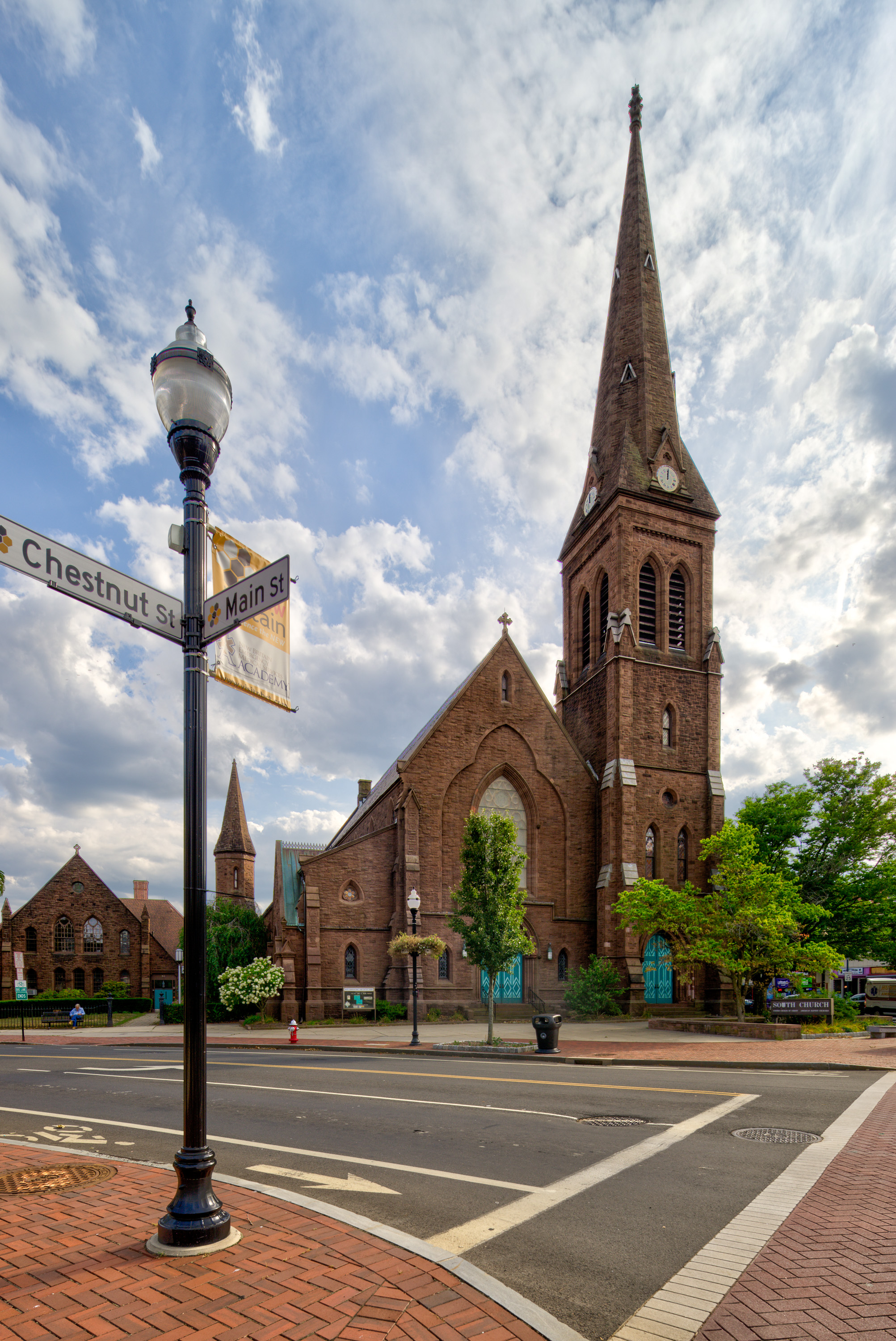
- South Congregational Church

- Location within Connecticut Location within the United States
- Location: 90 Main Street, New Britain, Connecticut
- Coordinates: 41°39′54″N 72°46′56″W
- Area: 0.5 acres (0.20 ha)
- Built: 1865
- Architect: Meachem, George F.
- Architectural style: Gothic Revival
- NRHP reference No.: 89000930
- Added to NRHP: April 6, 1990

The South Congregational - First Baptist Church or "South Church" is a historic church at 90 Main Street in New Britain, Connecticut. It is a large brownstone Gothic Revival structure, located at a central intersection in the city's heart. The building was listed on the National Register of Historic Places in 1990. The congregation was established in 1842, and was merged with First Baptist Church of New Britain in 1974.

== Architecture ==
South Church occupies a prominent position in downtown New Britain, occupying a triangular parcel bounded on the west by Arch Street and Main Street on the east. It is a long rectangular structure, built out of brownstone, with a tower at the northwest corner and the parish house attached at the southeast corner. It is covered by a steep gabled roof, with a band of clerestory windows between the central main roof and that over the side aisles. The walls have Gothic buttressing, and windows are generally lancet-arched in the Gothic style. The tower has three stages and is 170 feet (52 m) in height, with a belfry that has Gothic arched louvers, and clockfaces set in gable dormers at the base of the steeple. The attached parish house, built four years after the church, also exhibits Gothic features. This church was built in 1865 to a design by Boston architect George F. Meacham, who was already known for his institutional designs. The parish house was added in 1889, also designed by Meacham.

== History of South Congregational Church ==
The South Church congregation was founded in 1842 and grew rapidly as the city's industrial base expanded. The church was a mainstay and welcoming influence to the city's immigrant communities, providing outreach services to a variety of ethnicities.

"On the 5th July, 1842, one hundred and nineteen of the members of the church withdrew from the First Church of Christ and were organized by the South Consociation of Hartford county as the 'South Congregational Church in New Britain.' Many disinterested persons thought and said at the time that this division would be disastrous to both societies, but from the active business habits of the people, the result has proved quite otherwise. The population has increased so rapidly that very respectable congregations have been secured in both parishes, notwithstanding the rapid growth of other denominations in the mean time. The yearly contributions to general benevolence may have been somewhat lessened, from the double expense of maintaining two societies in place of one, yet even this does not necessarily follow, for (strange as it may seem,) the ability of a community to give is in the proportion they are in the habit of giving. Over-grown churches, like over-stocked bee-hives, with many drones, need sometimes to swarm, for a full development of their working power. Some may say, why not pass these scenes in silence? Our reply is, we are writing partly for future generations, and should be recreant in duty to them to have said less; and lest we injure the feelings of some one living person, or do injustice to the dead, we refrain from saying more."

== See also ==
- National Register of Historic Places listings in Hartford County, Connecticut
