= First Baptist Church of Scituate =

Historic church in Massachusetts, United States

- U.S. National Register of Historic Places
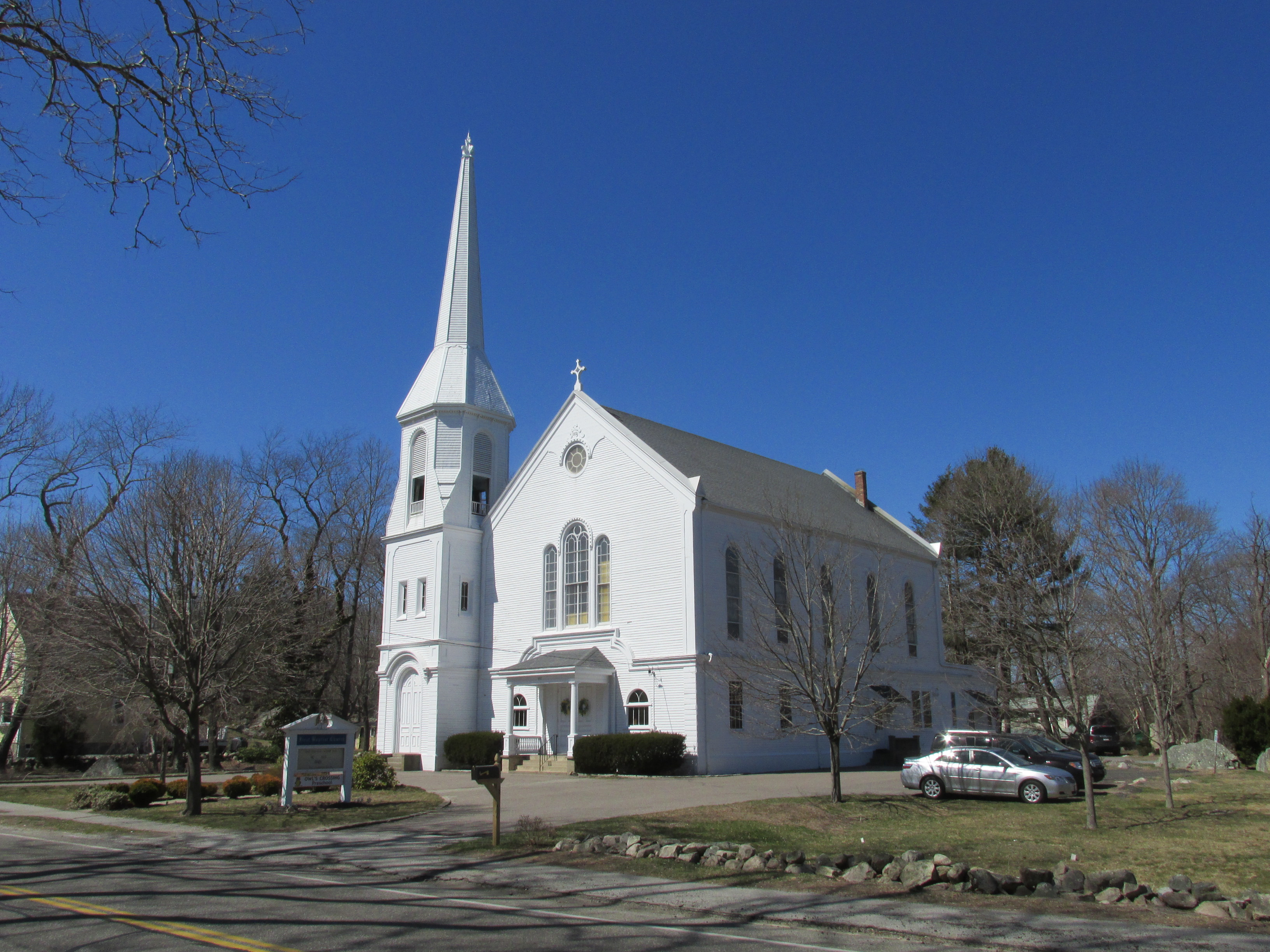
- The church in 2013

- Location within Massachusetts Location within the United States
- Location: 656 & 660 Country Way, Scituate, Massachusetts
- Coordinates: 42°12′58″N 70°46′37″W
- Built: 1870
- Architect: Shepard S. Woodcock
- Architectural style: Victorian
- NRHP reference No.: 15000469
- Added to NRHP: July 27, 2015

The First Baptist Church of Scituate is a historic Baptist church building at 656 Country Way in Scituate, Massachusetts. It is a 2 1/2-story wood-frame structure with eclectic Victorian styling, including quoining at the corners and bracketed eaves. It has a three-part round-arch window in the front-facing gable end, with a square tower rising to an octagonal spire set to its left. The church was built in 1869–70 as the second sanctuary for a Baptist congregation founded in 1815. The architect was Shepard S. Woodcock.

The church and its associated parsonage were listed on the National Register of Historic Places in 2015.

== See also ==
- National Register of Historic Places listings in Plymouth County, Massachusetts
