= Massachusetts Bicycle Club =

Coordinates: 42°21′2.76″N 71°4′41.51″W

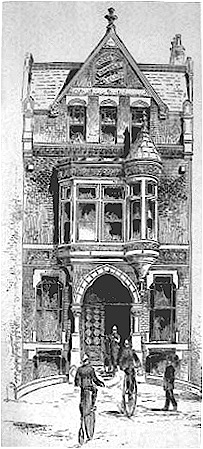
Club-House, 152 Newbury Street, Boston

The Massachusetts Bicycle Club (est.1879) was a cycling club in Boston, Massachusetts.

== Brief history ==
The club was founded on January 10, 1879. "We, the undersigned, hereby agree to organize ourselves into a bicycle club, to be called The Massachusetts Bicycle Club." Founders included Albert A. Pope, Edward W. Pope, William G. Fish, Arthur W. Pope, Frank W. Freeborn, George G. Hall, H.E. Parkhurst, C.H. Corken, William H. Ames, Augustus F. Webster, H. Winslow Warren, Winfield S. Slocum, William F. Brownell, Joseph P. Livermore, and Albert S. Parsons. Membership rose to 70 in 1883; and to 225 members in 1885.

Architect George F. Meacham designed a new headquarters building for the club in 1884, located at 152 Newbury Street in Boston. By 1885, the club had "established a small repair-shop in its wheel-room, with a small assortment of parts and sundries of prominent makes, for the convenience of members."

In May 1883, the club took part in a League of American Wheelmen parade on Fifth Avenue in New York City. Members wore uniforms of "dark-blue and white cap." The club organized a "Midwinter Carnival" at Mechanics Hall in December 1885. "The affair attracted some 3,000 enthusiasts. At 8 in the morning, as a band played, 100 cyclists paraded into the building dressed as devils, counts, revolutionary soldiers. ...A 'bicycle drill squad' and a trick rider wowed the assembly. At 9, Pierre Lallement himself ...appeared on his original 1865 velocipede."
