= Jacob Stroyer =

American preacher and writer (1849–1908)

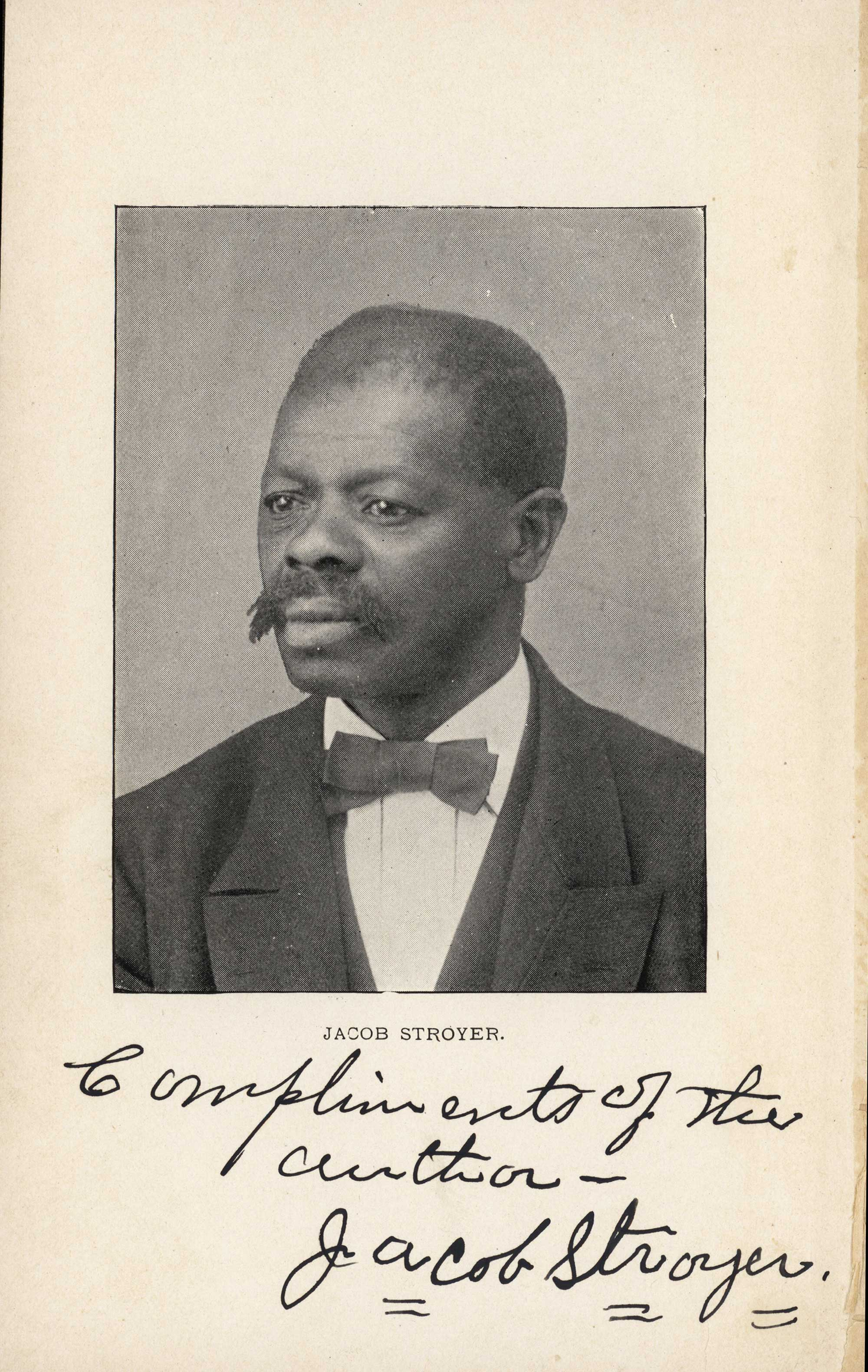
- Frontispiece of My Life in the South
- Born: 1849; Eastover, South Carolina
- Died: February 7, 1908 (aged 58–59); Salem, Massachusetts
- Occupation: Preacher
- Writing career
- Genre: Autobiography
- Notable work: My Life in the South

Jacob Stroyer (1849 - February 7, 1908) was an American former slave who became a preacher in Massachusetts. He is best known for his autobiography, My Life in the South.

== Early life ==
Stroyer was born on the Kensington Plantation in Eastover, South Carolina in 1849. In the first edition of My Life in the South (1879), Stroyer said he was born in 1846. But in the fourth edition (1898), he corrected his date of birth to 1849, and he also specified that he was thirteen years old in the summer of 1863 when he was assigned to a Confederate work detail on Sullivan's Island and fourteen years old when he was wounded at Ft. Sumter in the summer of 1864.

Stroyer's father, William, was born in Sierra Leone and was captured and brought to America as a youth. The younger Stroyer knew little about his father's family background, other than the names of his paternal grandparents. Stroyer's mother, Chloe, was born in South Carolina where her family had been enslaved for several generations. As a youth, he worked as a hostler. As a child, Stroyer taught himself to read.

After the Civil War, he attended schools in Columbia and Charleston. Stroyer moved to Worcester, Massachusetts in 1870. He attended Worcester Academy for two years.

== Career ==
He was licensed as an African Methodist Episcopal minister. In Newport, Rhode Island, he was ordained a deacon. He moved to Salem, Massachusetts to preach.

He first published his autobiography, My Life in the South, in 1879. This was revised three times, with the fourth edition published in 1898.

Jacob Stroyer died in Salem Hospital in Salem on February 7, 1908, of heart disease. His death certificate states that the information used to fill out the "statistical remarks" on the certificate was derived from "Book written by himself." He is buried in Greenlawn Cemetery in Salem.

== Bibliography ==
- Doughton, Thomas L.; McCarthy, B. Eugene; From bondage to belonging: The Worcester slave narratives. Univ of Massachusetts Press, 2007, ISBN 1-55849-623-8
