= Washington School (Weymouth, Massachusetts) =

- U.S. National Register of Historic Places
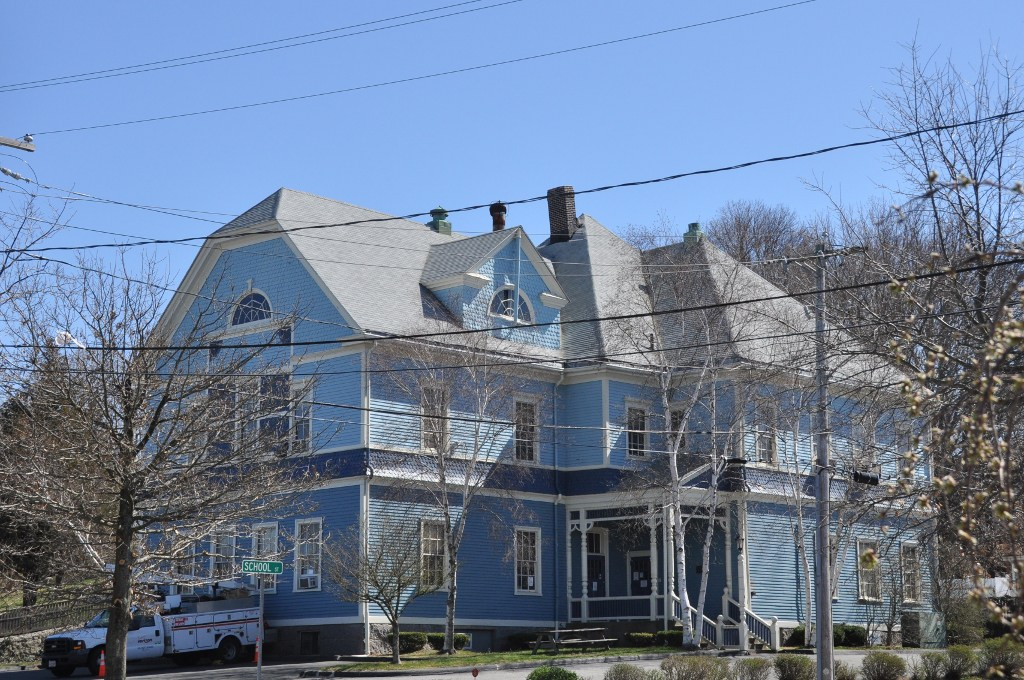

- Location within Massachusetts Location within the United States
- Location: Weymouth, Massachusetts
- Coordinates: 42°12′53″N 70°55′19″W
- Built: 1887
- Architect: Shepard S. Woodcock
- Architectural style: Stick/Eastlake, Queen Anne
- NRHP reference No.: 86001218
- Added to NRHP: June 5, 1986

The Washington School is a historic school building at 8 School Street in Weymouth, Massachusetts, United States. The 2 1/2-story wood-frame building was designed by Shepard S. Woodcock and built in 1887. The six-room building has characteristic Queen Anne styling, including asymmetrical massing, varied gable treatments, use of decorative fish-scale shingles, and an elaborately decorated entry porch.

The building was listed on the National Register of Historic Places in 1986. It has since been converted into offices.

== See also ==
- National Register of Historic Places listings in Norfolk County, Massachusetts
