= Machine Shop Village District =

Historic district in Massachusetts, United States

- U.S. National Register of Historic Places
- U.S. Historic district
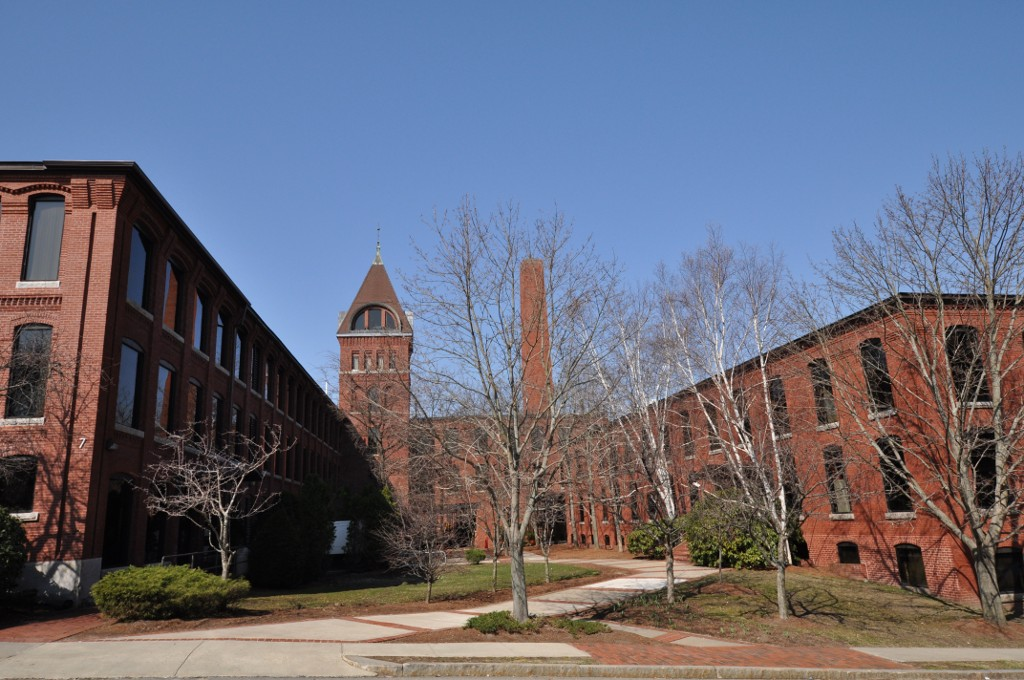
- The former mill complex above which the village is located

- Location within Massachusetts Location within the United States
- Location: North Andover, Massachusetts
- Coordinates: 42°41′59″N 71°7′37″W
- Area: 90 acres (36 ha)
- Built: 1832
- Architect: Multiple
- Architectural style: Greek Revival, Late Victorian, Federal
- NRHP reference No.: 82000482
- Added to NRHP: October 14, 1982

The Machine Shop Village District is a historic district roughly bounded by Main, Pleasant, Clarendon, Water, 2nd Streets, and B&M Railroad in North Andover, Massachusetts. The district encompasses a well-preserved former textile mill village developed in the mid-19th century, with a variety of worker and upper-class housing, and two historic mill complexes. It was added to the National Register of Historic Places in 1982.

== Description and history ==
Machine Shop Village is located just east of the modern center of North Andover, and is roughly centered at the junction Water, Elm, and High Streets. Water Street roughly parallels Cochichewick Creek, which flows northwest just to its south, and provided the power for the village's industries. Two multibuilding brick industrial complexes extend along the north side of Water Street on either side of High Street, and the residential areas are south of Water Street. Non-residential civic buildings include the 1865 Trinitarian Congregational Church, and a few small wood-frame commercial buildings, a remnant survivor of a more numerous group that populated the village at its height.

The area has been the site of industrial development since the 18th century, but textiles began to be produced in North Andover only in 1802. The oldest mill building in Machine Shop Village is a stone structure dating to about 1825. The village developed most during the mid-19th century, and includes a number of examples of worker housing, including a particularly well-preserved series of double cottages on Water Street that date to 1839. Several of the mill managers and owners also lived in the village, leaving examples of relatively high style Greek Revival, Italianate, and Second Empire residences. The Blanchard House at 10 Elm Street is a particularly fine example of Queen Anne architecture, designed by William C. Richardson of Boston and completed about 1881.

== See also ==
- National Register of Historic Places listings in Essex County, Massachusetts
