= Henry Goulding House =

Historic house in Massachusetts, United States

- U.S. National Register of Historic Places
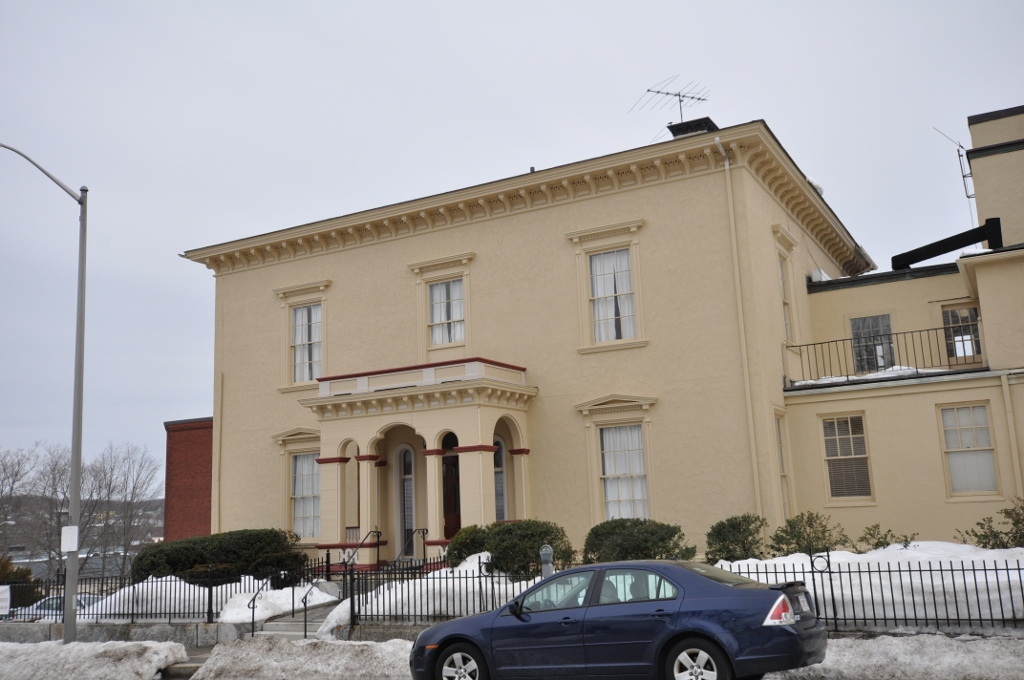

- Location within Massachusetts Location within the United States
- Location: 26 Harvard St., Worcester, Massachusetts
- Coordinates: 42°16′9″N 71°48′8″W
- Area: 1.4 acres (0.57 ha)
- Built: c. 1850
- Architect: M.G. Wheelock
- Architectural style: Italianate
- MPS: Worcester MRA
- NRHP reference No.: 80000564
- Added to NRHP: March 05, 1980

The Henry Goulding House is an historic house at 26 Harvard Street in Worcester, Massachusetts, US. Built in 1850-51 for a major local industrialist, it is one of the city's most opulent Italianate houses. In 1921, the house became the Swedish Lutheran Home for the Aged after the Goulding heirs gave it to the Swedish Lutheran Church of Worcester. The house was owned by Lutheran Social Services, Inc. in 1980 when the house was added to the National Register of Historic Places. It is now owned by the Sheehan Health Group and is operated as the Lutheran Rehabilitation & Skilled Care Center.

== Description and history ==
The Henry Goulding House is located on the northern fringe of downtown Worcester, on the east side of Harvard Street at its junction with Dix Street. The building is now a large multisection structure, extending for some length along the road. The original mansion block is located at the northern end, with an early 20th-century addition in the middle, and a 1970s modern section at the southern end. It is a two-story frame structure, with a low-pitch hip roof and stuccoed exterior. The roof eave is adorned with modillion blocks. The main facade is three bays wide, with sash windows arranged around the center entrance. The ground floor windows are flanked by slender pilasters and have bracketed sills and a gabled and bracketed lintel; the second floor windows are more simply framed, with a projecting sill and projecting bracketed cornice. The entrance is sheltered by a portico with round-arch openings and a roof with modillioned cornice and balustrade.

The opulent Italianate mansion was built in 1850 for Henry Goulding on the site of his earlier Greek Revival house, W.H. Goulding House, which was moved to 4 Dix Place. Goulding was a principal partner in some of Worcester's largest industrial businesses. He was also a Worcester selectman, a founder and president of the Mechanics' National Bank, and a founder of the Worcester Mechanics' Association. The house was occupied by Goulding until his death in 1866, and then by his son. His heirs sold the house to the Swedish Lutheran church in 1921, which built the first addition and converted the property to its present medical support use.

== See also ==
- National Register of Historic Places listings in northwestern Worcester, Massachusetts
- National Register of Historic Places listings in Worcester County, Massachusetts
