= Central Square Historic District (Weymouth, Massachusetts) =

Historic district in Massachusetts, United States

- U.S. National Register of Historic Places
- U.S. Historic district
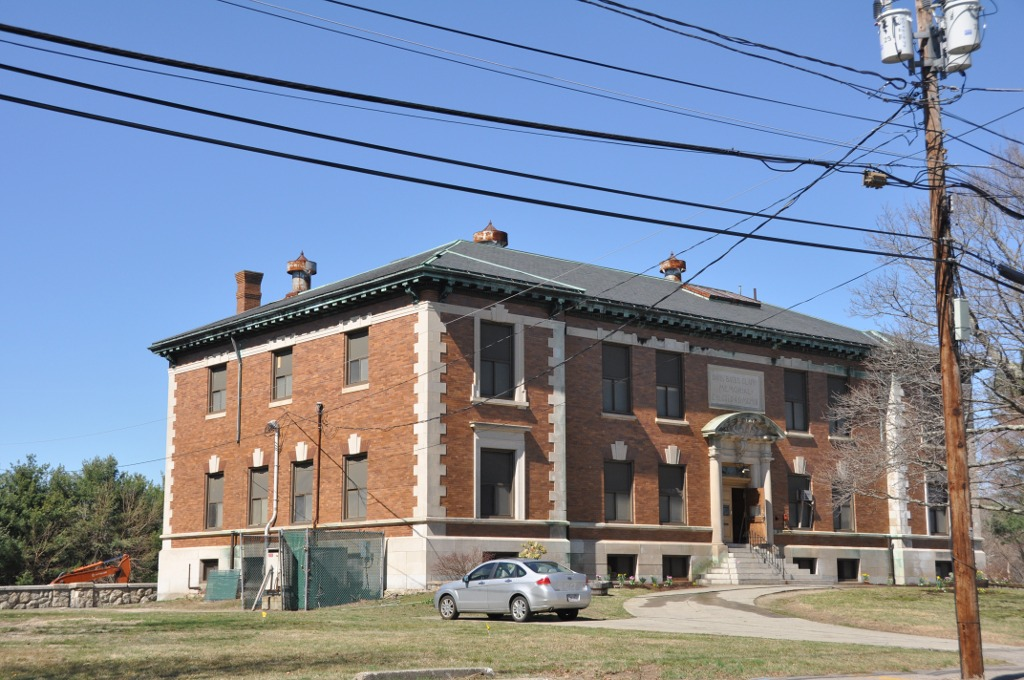
- Clapp Memorial Building

- Location within Massachusetts Location within the United States
- Location: Weymouth, Massachusetts
- Coordinates: 42°13′0″N 70°56′12″W
- Architect: Wilson, Edward I.; Woodcock, S.S.
- Architectural style: Classical Revival, Greek Revival, Italianate
- NRHP reference No.: 92000040
- Added to NRHP: February 13, 1992

The Central Square Historic District is a historic district encompassing an area in Weymouth, Massachusetts, which was historically significant in the pre-factory period of shoe manufacturing. It is centered at the intersection of Middle and Broad Streets, extending on Middle Street from Maple to Charles Streets, and on Broad from just west of the main junction to Putnam Street. Most of the houses built in this area between 1850 and 1870 were built for workers in relatively small shoemaking operations, one of which still stands at the main intersection. Later additions to the district include the Jefferson School, a Masonic temple, and the Clapp Memorial Building, which originally housed a boys' club.

The district was added to the National Register of Historic Places in 1992.

== See also ==
- National Register of Historic Places listings in Norfolk County, Massachusetts
