= Greenlawn Cemetery (Salem, Massachusetts) =

Historic cemetery in Massachusetts, United States

- U.S. National Register of Historic Places
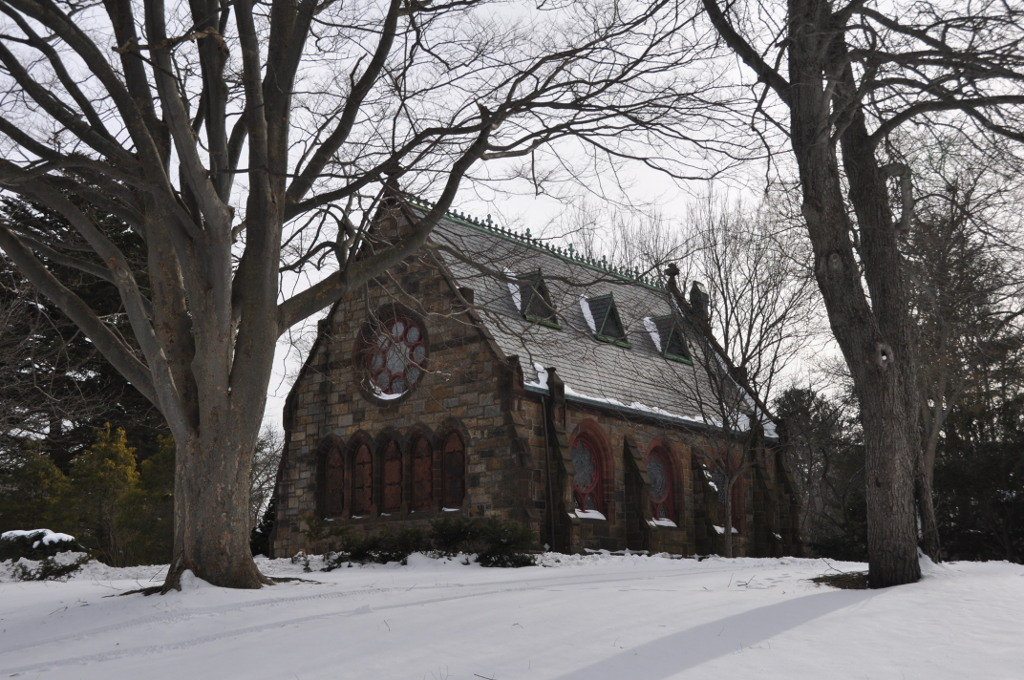
- The cemetery chapel

- Location within Massachusetts Location within the United States
- Location: 57 Orne St., Salem, Massachusetts
- Coordinates: 42°31′58″N 70°54′15″W
- Area: 100 acres (40 ha)
- Built: 1854
- NRHP reference No.: 15000467
- Added to NRHP: July 27, 2015

Greenlawn Cemetery is a historic cemetery at 57 Orne Street in Salem, Massachusetts. The cemetery was founded in 1807, but received a major redesign in the 1880s to bring it into the then-popular rural cemetery style, with winding lanes and landscaping. The 100-acre (40 ha) is notable for its large number of specimen plants, which is second in the state to the Arnold Arboretum in Boston. It has more than 6000 burials, and is still in active use.

The cemetery was listed on the National Register of Historic Places in 2015.

It is the burial place of Medal of Honor recipient John Phillip Riley (1877–1950). Reverend Jacob Stroyer (1848–1908) is buried there too. Medal of Honor recipient Thomas E. Atkinson (1824–1868 †) has a cenotaph in his honor.

== See also ==
- National Register of Historic Places listings in Salem, Massachusetts
- National Register of Historic Places listings in Essex County, Massachusetts
