= Oak View =

Oakview and Oakview may refer to:

== Communities ==
- Oak View, California
- Oakview (Holly Springs, Mississippi), listed on the NRHP in Mississippi
- Oakview, Missouri, a village
- Oakview Heights, West Virginia

== Buildings ==
- Oak View, Norwood, Massachusetts
- Oak View Mall

== See also ==
- Oak View Elementary School
- Oak View Group
- OakView Preservation Incorporated
