= Ruth Hamilton (singer) =

African American contralto (1921–2001)

Ruth Esther Hamilton (1921 – October 29, 2001) was a leading contralto singer from Boston. Called "one of the most important singers in Boston" by the Boston Globe, in 2001 the Hamilton-Garrett Center for Music & Arts in Roxbury neighborhood of Boston, MA was named after Hamilton, and another prominent member of the historic Charles Street African Methodist Episcopal Church, Elta Garrett.

In 2023, she was recognized as one of "Boston's most admired, beloved, and successful Black Women leaders" by the Black Women Lead project.

== Early life ==
Hamilton was born in Atlanta in 1921 the youngest of 10 children to John Russell and Reacie Hamilton.

After Pearl Harbor, Hamilton joined the WAACs while husband Henry Ellison was enlisted. She began as a motor corps driver, but once her singing talent was discovered Hamilton began performing with the WAAC band.

== Career ==
Hamilton moved to Boston in 1943 with her husband who found work as a Pullman porter. They formed a musical group known as "the Ellison Duo". Together they performed for the duration of their marriage, including a performance in their hometown at St. Paul AME Church in 1948. Upon arriving in Boston, Hamilton joined the Charles Street A.M.E. Church. As she developed her renown, Hamilton took a few lessons with African-American composer Roland Hayes and performed with at the Temple Ohabei Shalom and Temple Shalom in Brookline, MA.

In 1994 Hamilton contributed contralto vocals to Watch and Pray: Spirituals and Art Songs, a recording of songs by African-American women composers, which was her first nationally distributed recording.

Ruth Hamilton died on October 29, 2001 in Cambridge, at the age of 79. The funeral was held at her Charles Street church.

== Legacy ==
Described as a Cambridge icon, Hamilton was awarded the Cambridge Peace Commission and Justice Award in 1997.

Hamilton received the 25th Annual Sacco-Vanzetti Memorial Award for Contributions to Social Justice on Sunday, June 23, 2001, at the Community Church in Boston.
