= Fred Holland Day House =

Historic house in Massachusetts, United States

- U.S. National Register of Historic Places
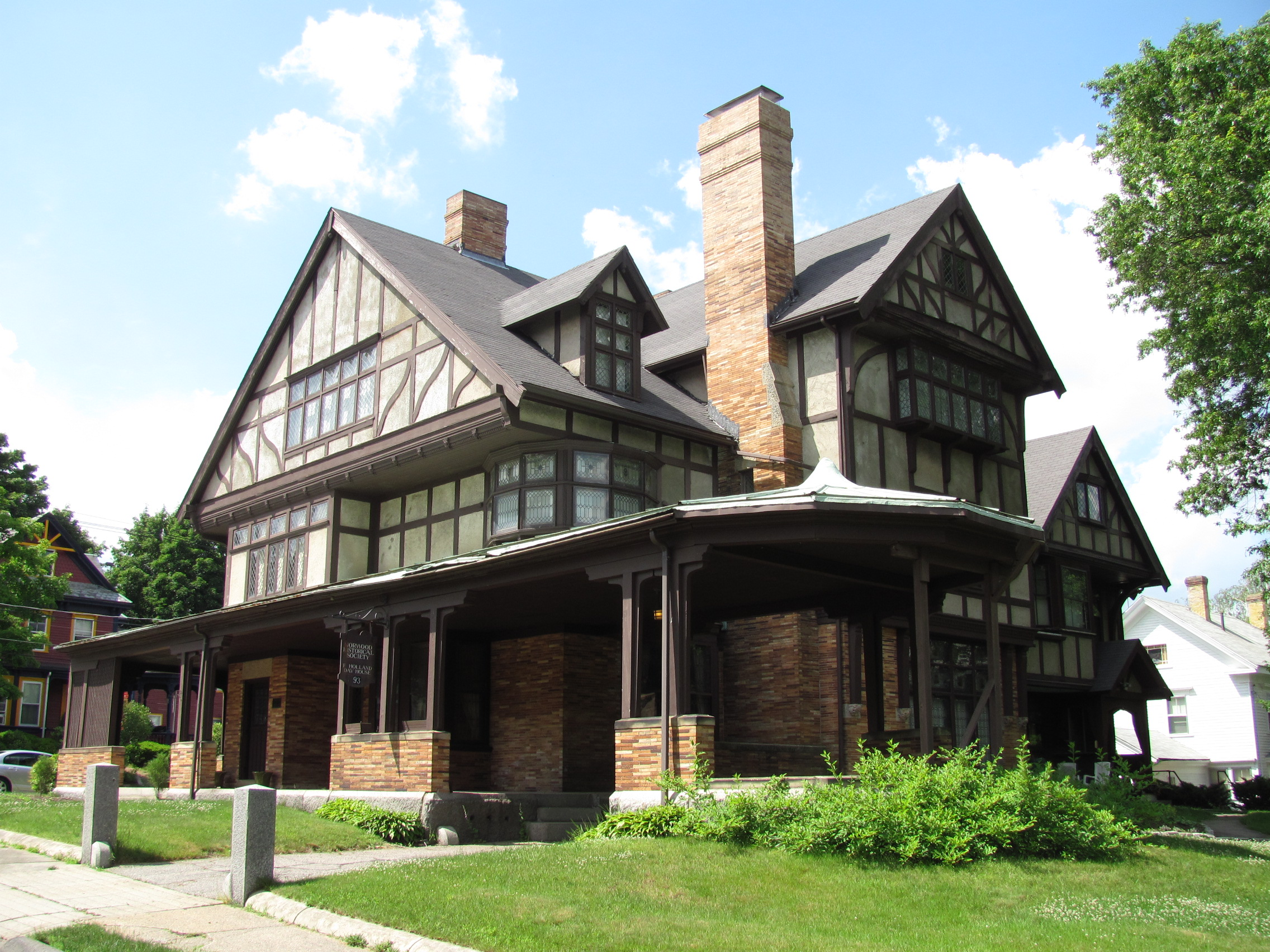

- Location within Massachusetts Location within the United States
- Location: 93 Day Street, Norwood, Massachusetts
- Coordinates: 42°11′35″N 71°12′13″W
- Built: 1859; 1890-92
- Built by: Tyler Thayer (1859)
- Architect: Benjamin F. Dwight (1859); J. Williams Beal (1890-92)
- Architectural style: Tudor Revival
- NRHP reference No.: 77000191
- Added to NRHP: April 18, 1977

The Fred Holland Day House is a historic house located at 93 Day Street in Norwood, Massachusetts.

== Description and history ==
The Day House was originally built in 1859 for Lewis Day, a Boston tanner, and wife Anna (Smith) Day. Architect Benjamin F. Dwight designed the house in the Second Empire style, with a high mansard roof and cupola. Dwight was also the architect of nearby Oak View, begun in 1868. During 1890-92 the Day House was rebuilt at the direction of the Days' son, F. Holland Day, who hired Boston architect J. Williams Beal to remodel the house in the Tudor Revival style.

It is a 2 1/2-story wood-framed house, with complex massing and a busy roofline with gables of various size. Its ground floor is finished in stone, and the upper levels have the half-timbering typical of the Tudor Revival style. It now houses the Norwood Historical Society and is open to the public for touring.

The house was listed on the National Register of Historic Places on April 18, 1977, for its architecture as well as its association with Day, a notable photographer and publisher.

== See also ==
- National Register of Historic Places listings in Norfolk County, Massachusetts
