= Fogg Building =

- U.S. National Register of Historic Places
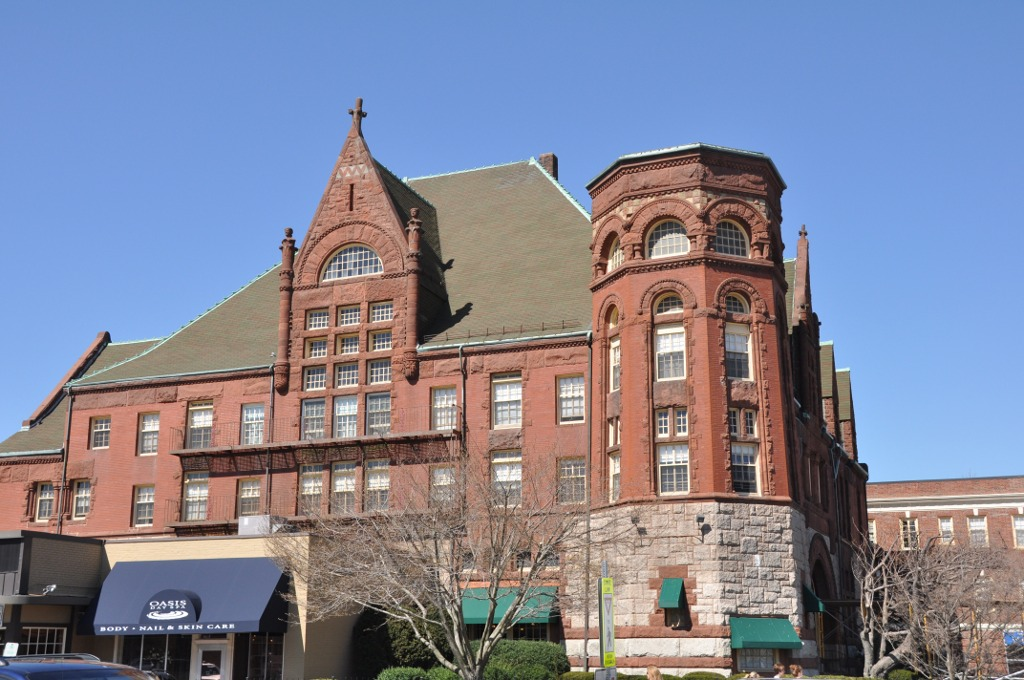

- Location within Massachusetts Location within the United States
- Location: Weymouth, Massachusetts
- Coordinates: 42°10′28″N 70°57′7″W
- Built: 1888
- Architect: J. Williams Beal
- NRHP reference No.: 83000594
- Added to NRHP: March 10, 1983

The Fogg Building is a historic commercial building at 100–110 Pleasant Street and 6–10 Columbian Street in Weymouth, Massachusetts. The 3 1/2-story masonry building was designed by J. Williams Beal, and built in 1887 for local businessman John Fogg. The Richardsonian Romanesque structure originally housed a performance space and social gathering places in its upper floors; these spaces have been converted to apartments.

The building was listed on the National Register of Historic Places in 1983.

== See also ==
- National Register of Historic Places listings in Norfolk County, Massachusetts
