= Adams Building (Quincy, Massachusetts) =

- U.S. National Register of Historic Places
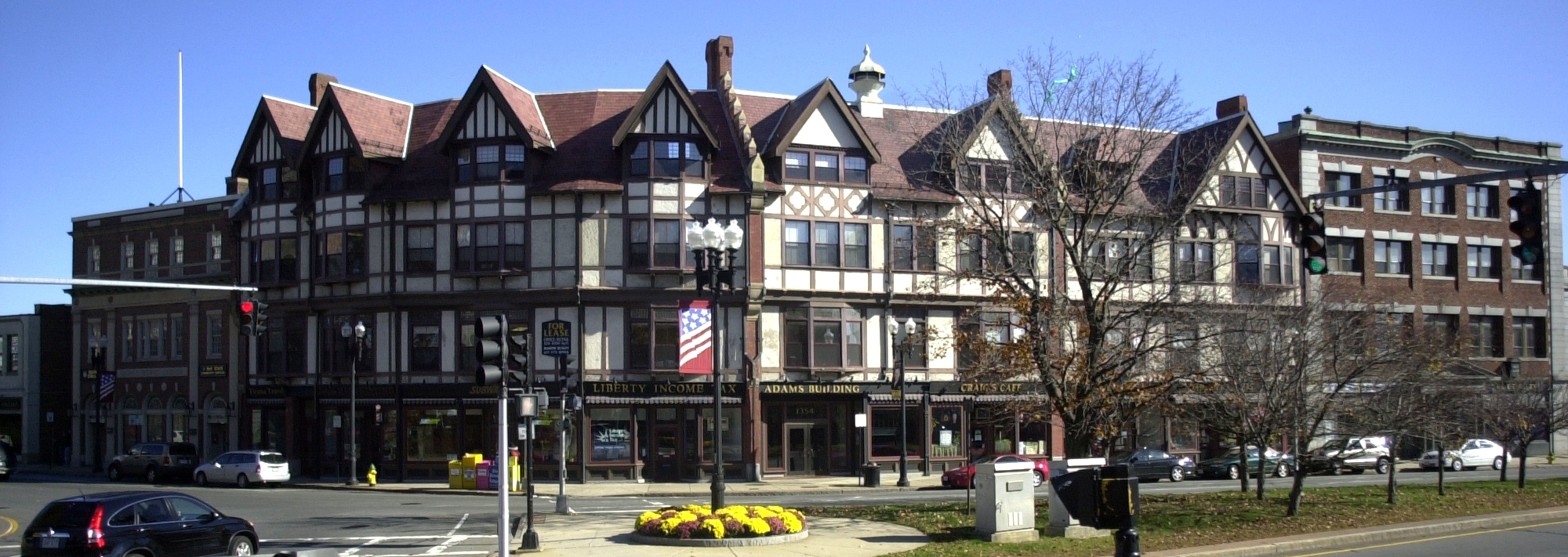

- Location within Massachusetts Location within the United States
- Location: 1342–1368 Hancock St., Quincy, Massachusetts
- Coordinates: 42°15′2″N 71°0′9.5″W
- Area: 0.3 acres (0.12 ha)
- Built: 1880
- Architect: J. Williams Beal
- Architectural style: Tudor Revival, Jacobethan Revival
- NRHP reference No.: 83000593
- Added to NRHP: June 23, 1983

The Adams Building is a historic commercial building at 1342–1368 Hancock Street in downtown Quincy, Massachusetts. Built in stages between 1880 and 1890, it is a distinctive example of Jacobethan architecture, and is one of city's oldest commercial buildings. It was owned for many years by members of the politically prominent Adams family. The building was listed on the National Register of Historic Places in 1983.

== Description and history ==
The Adams Building is located in downtown Quincy, roughly across Hancock Street from the United First Parish Church. It is located on a curve in the street that was formerly a junction between Hancock and Temple Streets. It is a 3 1/2-story frame structure, with a stuccoed half-timbered exterior. It has an irregular facade characterized by the repetition of a variety of elements, including large gable wall dormers, polygonal bays, and patterns in the half-timbering. It is roughly divided into thirds by brick firewalls, which rise above the gabled roof.

The building was built in two stages, between 1880 and 1890, by John Quincy Adams II; it was one of the city's first large-scale commercial buildings. Its designer, J. Williams Beal, was a prominent Boston architect with a number of local commissions. When originally built, it housed retail space on the ground floor, and a mixture of residential space, professional offices, and a social club meeting space, on its upper floors. Its offices have been used by a procession of prominent local businessmen, politicians, and lawyers, and it house a local district court for a time. More recently, the upper floors have been converted entirely to professional office space. The building is locally unusual as an example of Jacobethan architecture, a variant on the Tudor Revival.

== See also ==
- National Register of Historic Places listings in Quincy, Massachusetts
