= J. Williams Beal =

American architect (1855–1919)

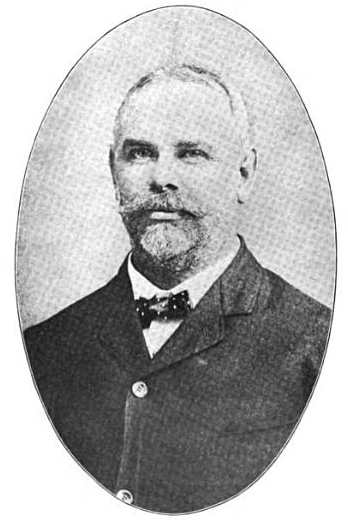
- Born: May 19, 1855; Norwell, Massachusetts, United States
- Died: July 7, 1919 (aged 64); Hanover, Massachusetts, United States
- Education: Massachusetts Institute of Technology
- Occupation: Architect

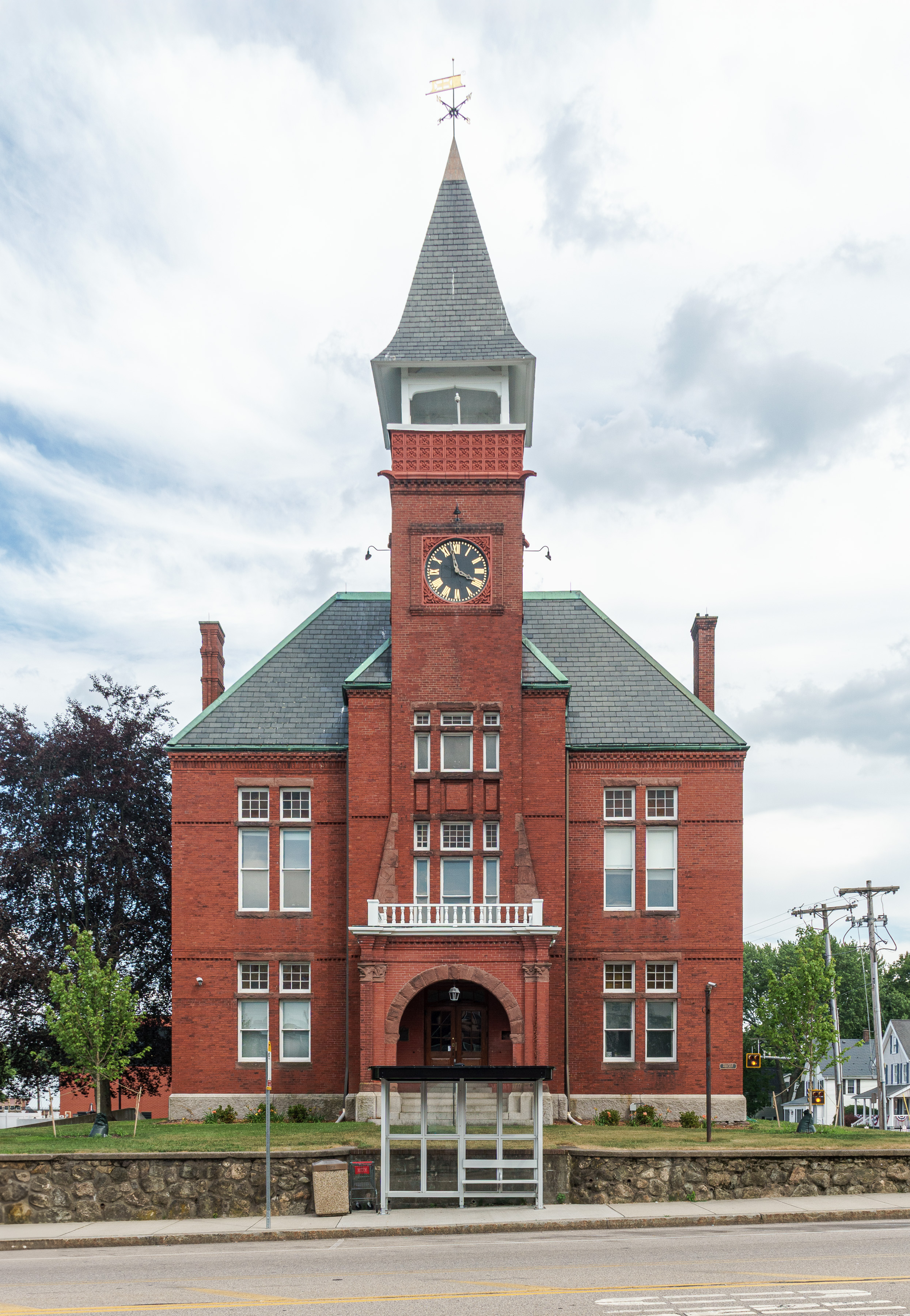
The Walpole Town Hall (1881), designed in the Queen Anne style

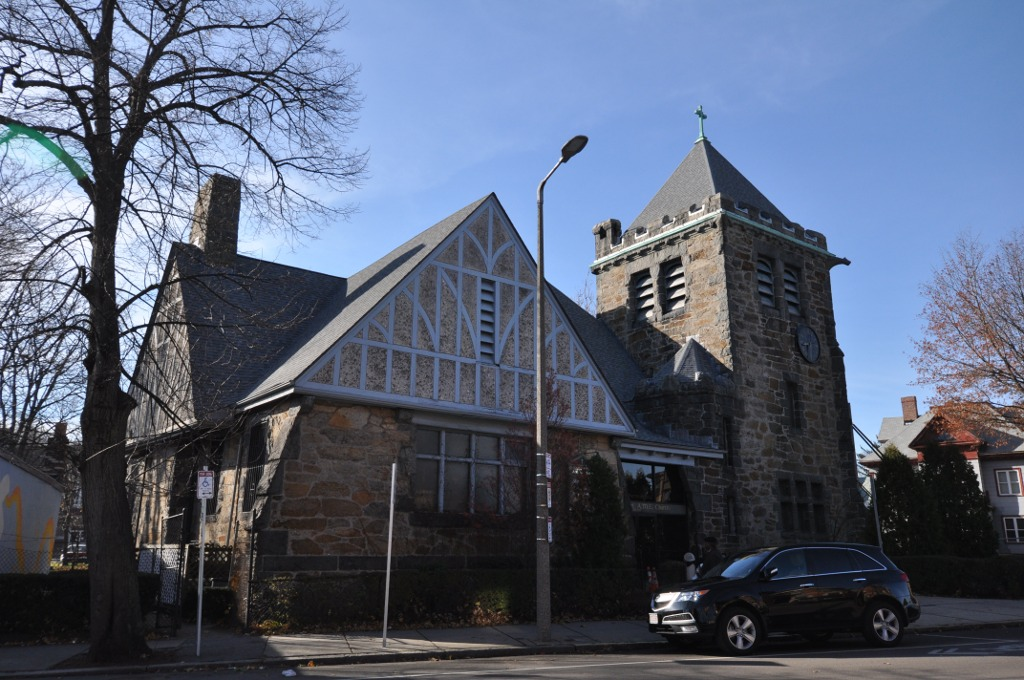
The Charles Street African Methodist Episcopal Church (1889) in Roxbury, Boston, designed in the Tudor Revival style

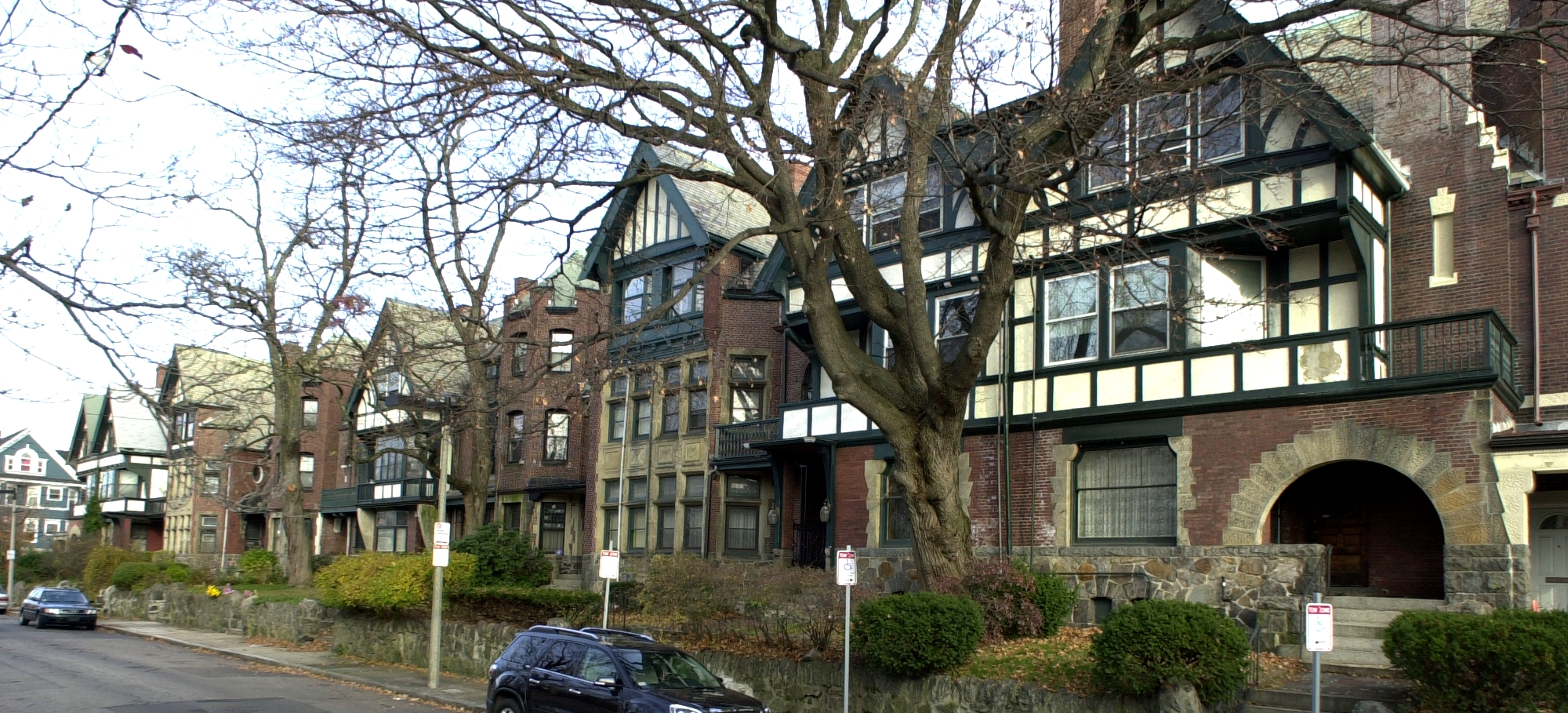
Harriswood Crescent (1890) in Roxbury, Boston, designed in the Tudor Revival style

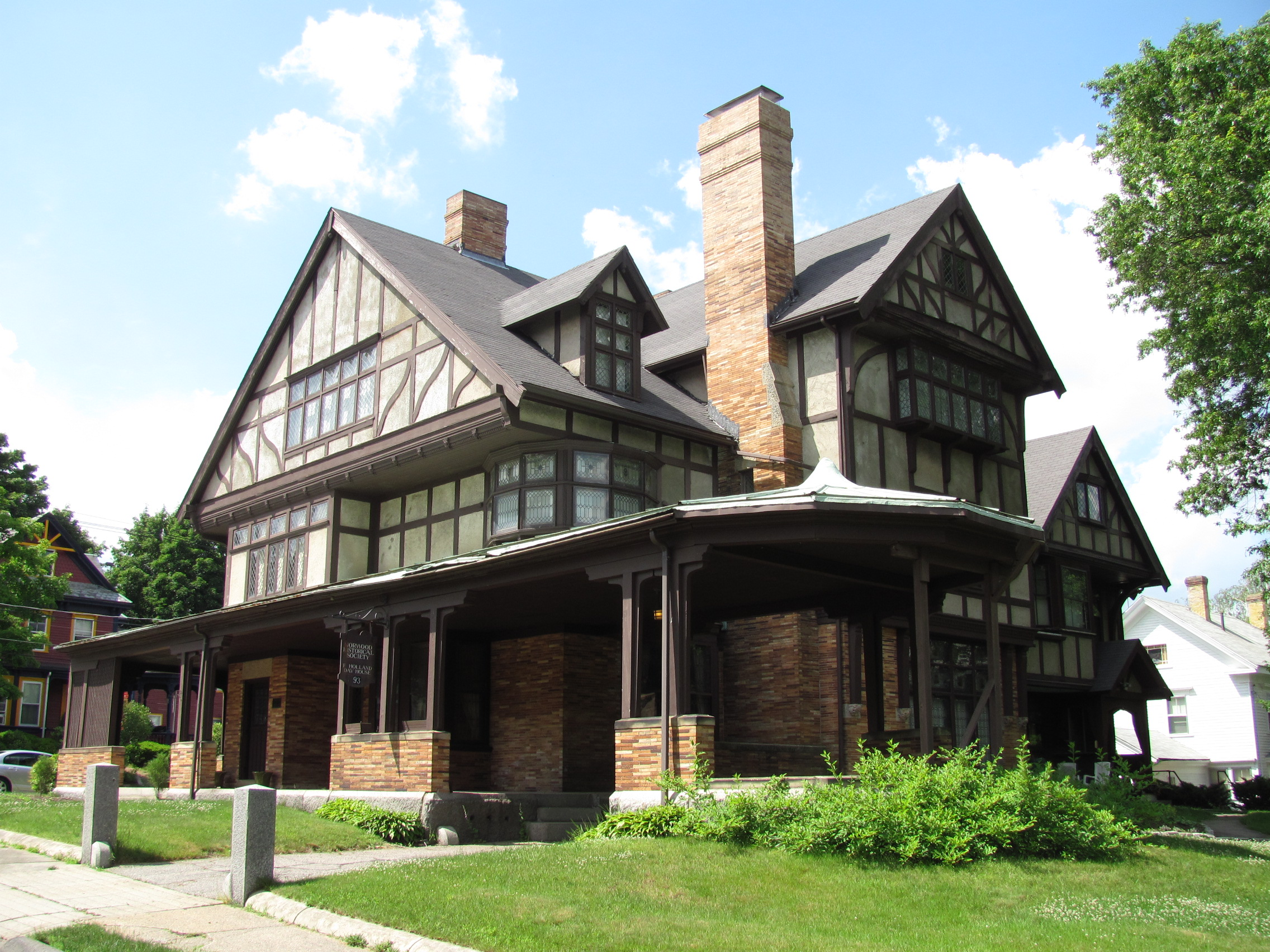
The Fred Holland Day House (1893) in Norwood, designed in the Tudor Revival style

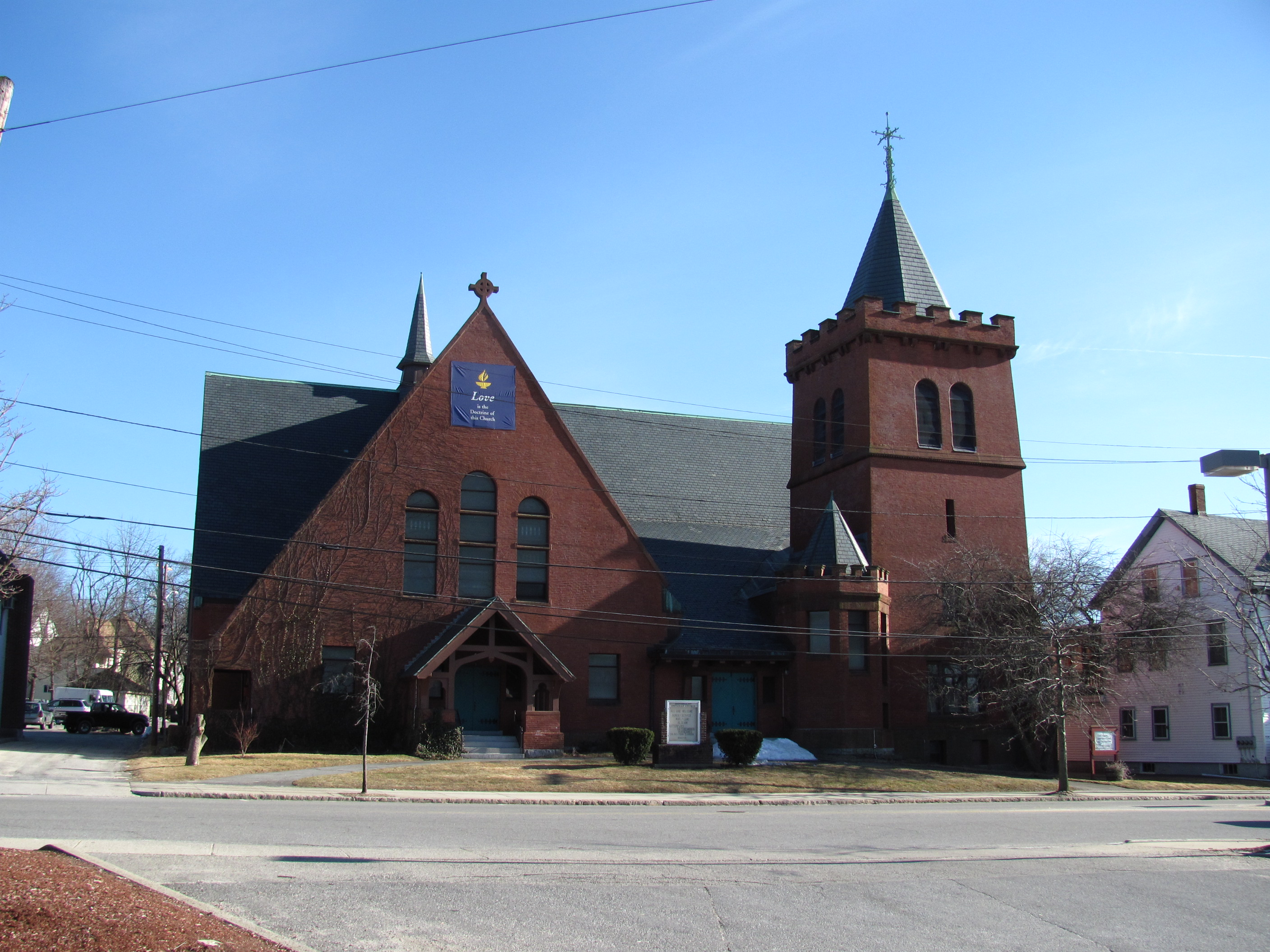
The Unitarian Universalist Church of Haverhill (1894), designed in the Gothic Revival style

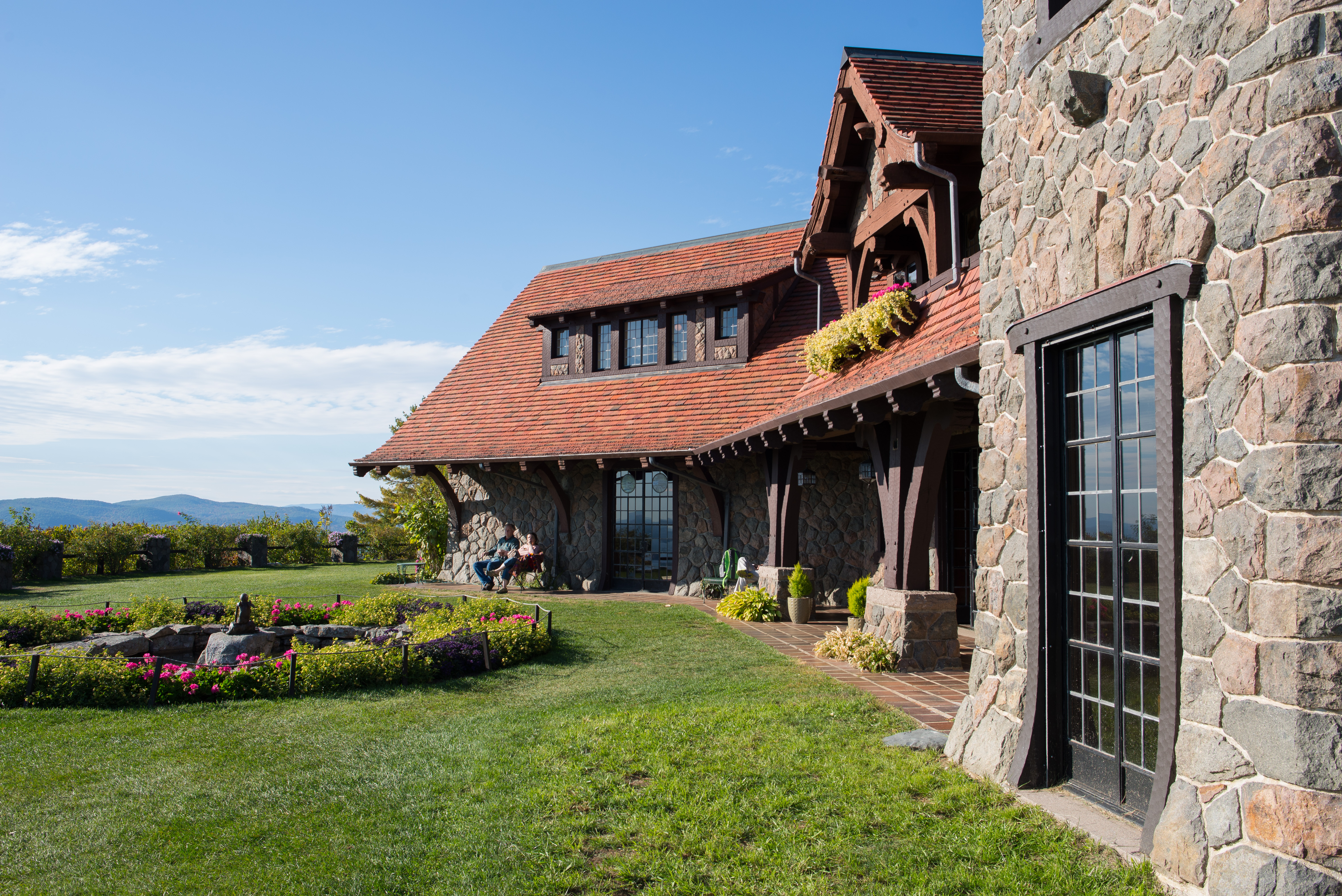
The Castle in the Clouds (1914) in Moultonborough, New Hampshire, designed in the Craftsman style

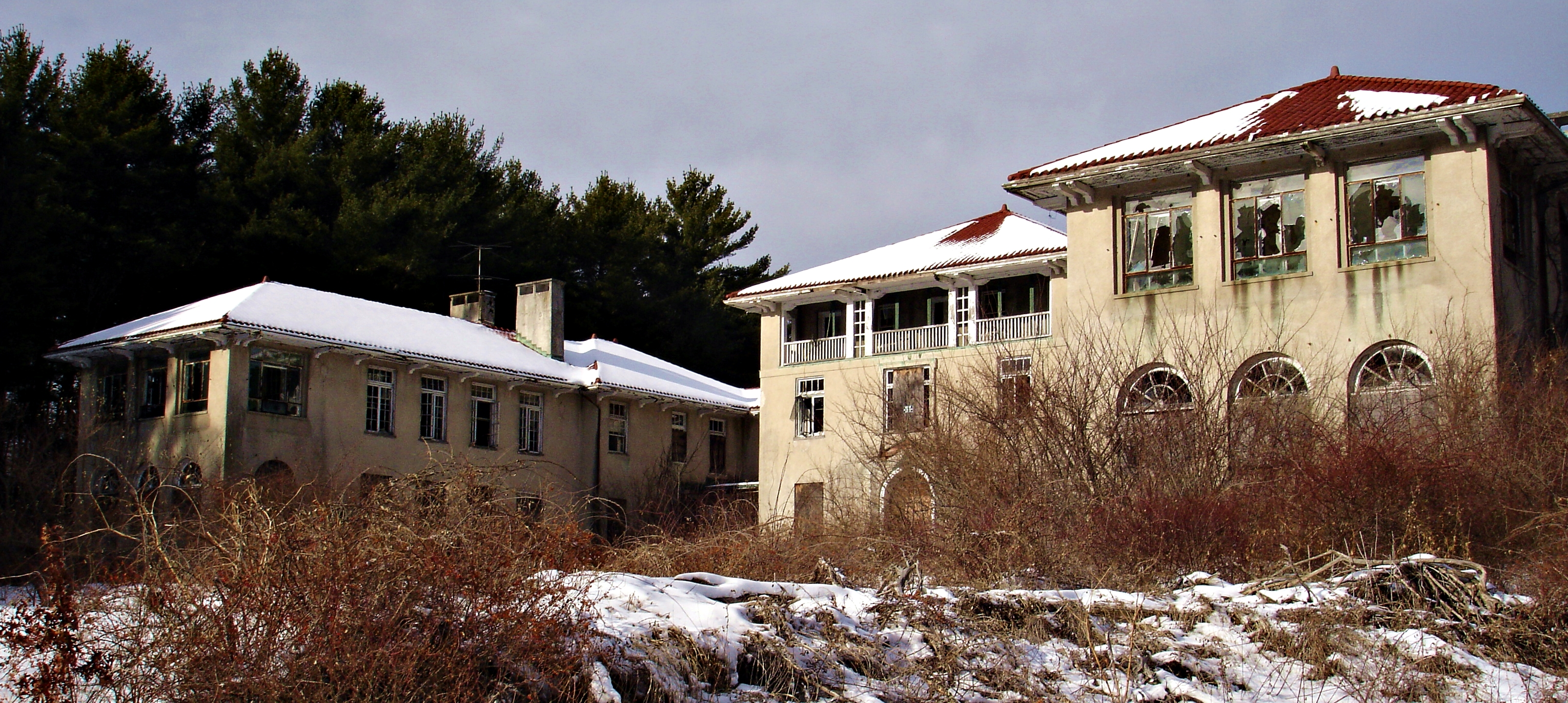
The former Plymouth County Hospital (1919, demolished) in Hanson, designed in the Mediterranean Revival style

J. Williams Beal (May 19, 1855 - July 7, 1919) was an American architect in practice in Boston, Massachusetts, from 1880 until his death in 1919. After his death his firm was continued by his sons and their partners as J. Williams Beal, Sons, until its eventual dissolution in 1981.

== Biography ==
John Williams Beal was born May 19, 1855, in South Scituate, now Norwell, Massachusetts, to John Beal and Lucy Ann Beal, née Barker. He was educated in the South Scituate public schools and at the former Hanover Academy before going on the Massachusetts Institute of Technology in Boston, from which he graduated in 1877. His first built work was the Civil War Memorial (1878) on the grounds of the First Congregational Church in Hanover, a town bordering South Scituate. At that time he was in the office of architect Samuel J. F. Thayer. He then worked in New York City for Richard Morris Hunt and McKim, Mead & White before opening an office of his own in Boston in 1880.

As an architect Beal designed a wide range of buildings, especially churches and public buildings. The most important of these is the Plymouth County Superior Court (1891) in Brockton. Among Beal's last and best-known works is the Castle in the Clouds (1914), a country house in Moultonborough, New Hampshire, for Thomas Gustave Plant. Early in the project's development, c. 1912, Beal suffered a debilitating stroke. By this time two of his sons, John W. Beal and Horatio W. Beal, had joined the office, and substantially took over this and other projects. Horatio, a trained architect, worked on design while John, who was not, served as a site superintendent and as his father's assistant. Horatio had studied at Harvard under Herbert Langford Warren, a luminary in the American Arts and Crafts movement, and likely had a large role in the design of Plant's house. Beal concluded his career with the design of the Plymouth County Hospital (1919, demolished), later the Cranberry Specialty Hospital, in Hanson, which was completed and dedicated shortly before his death.

== Personal life and death ==
Beal was married in 1884 to Mary Woodbridge Howes of Hanover; they had five children, including four sons and one daughter. From the time of his marriage until his death he lived in Hanover. He was a member of St. Andrew's Episcopal Church and was active in local politics, being at one time a candidate for state representative.

After his stroke, Beal suffered from heart disease. He remained in stable health until shortly before his death, which occurred July 7, 1919, at his home in Hanover.

== Legacy ==
Several of Beal's works, listed below, have been listed on the United States National Register of Historic Places.

After his death, sons John and Horatio continued the firm under the name J. Williams Beal, Sons. The firm outlived both sons, who died in 1971 and 1964, respectively, and was active until sometime before March 1981, when its remaining assets were auctioned.

== Architectural works ==
All dates are date of completion.

- 1881: Walpole Town Hall, Walpole, Massachusetts
  - NRHP-listed
- 1886: United Church of Norwood, Norwood, Massachusetts
  - Built for a Universalist congregation
- 1887: First Baptist Church, Abington, Massachusetts
- 1888: Fogg Building, Weymouth, Massachusetts
  - NRHP-listed
- 1888: Walcott Building, Natick, Massachusetts
  - Contributes to the NRHP-listed Natick Center Historic District
- 1889: Charles Street African Methodist Episcopal Church, Roxbury, Boston
  - Originally built for a Unitarian congregation; NRHP-listed
- 1889: Eliot Congregational Church (former), Roxbury, Boston
  - After a 1929 fire, converted into a parish house; NRHP-listed
- 1889: Winter Hill Baptist Church (former), Somerville, Massachusetts
  - As of 2026, a Presbyterian church
- 1890: Adams Building, Quincy, Massachusetts
  - NRHP-listed
- 1890: Harriswood Crescent, Roxbury, Boston
  - NRHP-listed
- 1891: Peabody-Williams House, Newton, Massachusetts
  - NRHP-listed
- 1891: Plymouth County Superior Court, Brockton, Massachusetts
  - A Beal-designed addition was completed in 1908
- 1892: Highland Spring Brewery Bottling and Storage Buildings, Roxbury, Boston
  - NRHP-listed
- 1892: Kilsyth Terrace, Brookline, Massachusetts
  - NRHP-listed
- 1892: Trinity Episcopal Church, Randolph, Massachusetts
- 1893: Fred Holland Day House, Norwood, Massachusetts
  - Incorporates the structure of an older house, built by Day's father in 1859; NRHP-listed
- 1893: First Baptist Church, Lexington, Massachusetts
- 1894: North Congregational Church, Middleborough, Massachusetts
- 1894: Unitarian Universalist Church of Haverhill, Haverhill, Massachusetts
- 1895: All Souls Unitarian Universalist Church, Greenfield, Massachusetts
- 1895: Abbott Memorial Library, Dexter, Maine
  - NRHP-listed
- 1899: Albert F. Hayden house, Roxbury, Boston
- 1900: Central United Methodist Church, Brockton, Massachusetts
- 1900: Masonic Temple, Brockton, Massachusetts
  - Demolished
- 1905: Acushnet-Wesley United Methodist Church, Acushnet, Massachusetts
- 1905: Anglim Building, Brockton, Massachusetts
  - The first skyscraper—defined as a building with a steel frame that supports curtain walls—to be built in Brockton and Plymouth County
- 1905: Marthas Vineyard National Bank (former), Vineyard Haven, Massachusetts
- 1906: Plymouth County Registry of Deeds (former), Plymouth, Massachusetts
- 1907: First Congregational Church, Chelsea, Massachusetts
- 1907: First United Methodist Church, Melrose, Massachusetts
- 1908: Peoples Savings Bank (former), Brockton, Massachusetts
- 1912: Cobb Memorial Library (former), Truro, Massachusetts
  - NRHP-listed
- 1912: Memorial Bridge, Island Grove Park, Abington, Massachusetts
  - Incorporating sculpture by Bela Pratt
- 1914: Castle in the Clouds, Moultonborough, New Hampshire
  - Named "Lucknow" by its original owner, Thomas Gustave Plant; NRHP-listed and a National Historic Landmark
- 1917: Mayflower Inn on Manomet Point, Plymouth, Massachusetts
  - Demolished
- 1919: Cranberry Specialty Hospital, Hanson, Massachusetts
  - Originally known as Plymouth County Hospital; demolished in 2017
