= Charles Street Meeting House =

Church building in Massachusetts, United States

Coordinates: 42.3579°N 71.0706°W

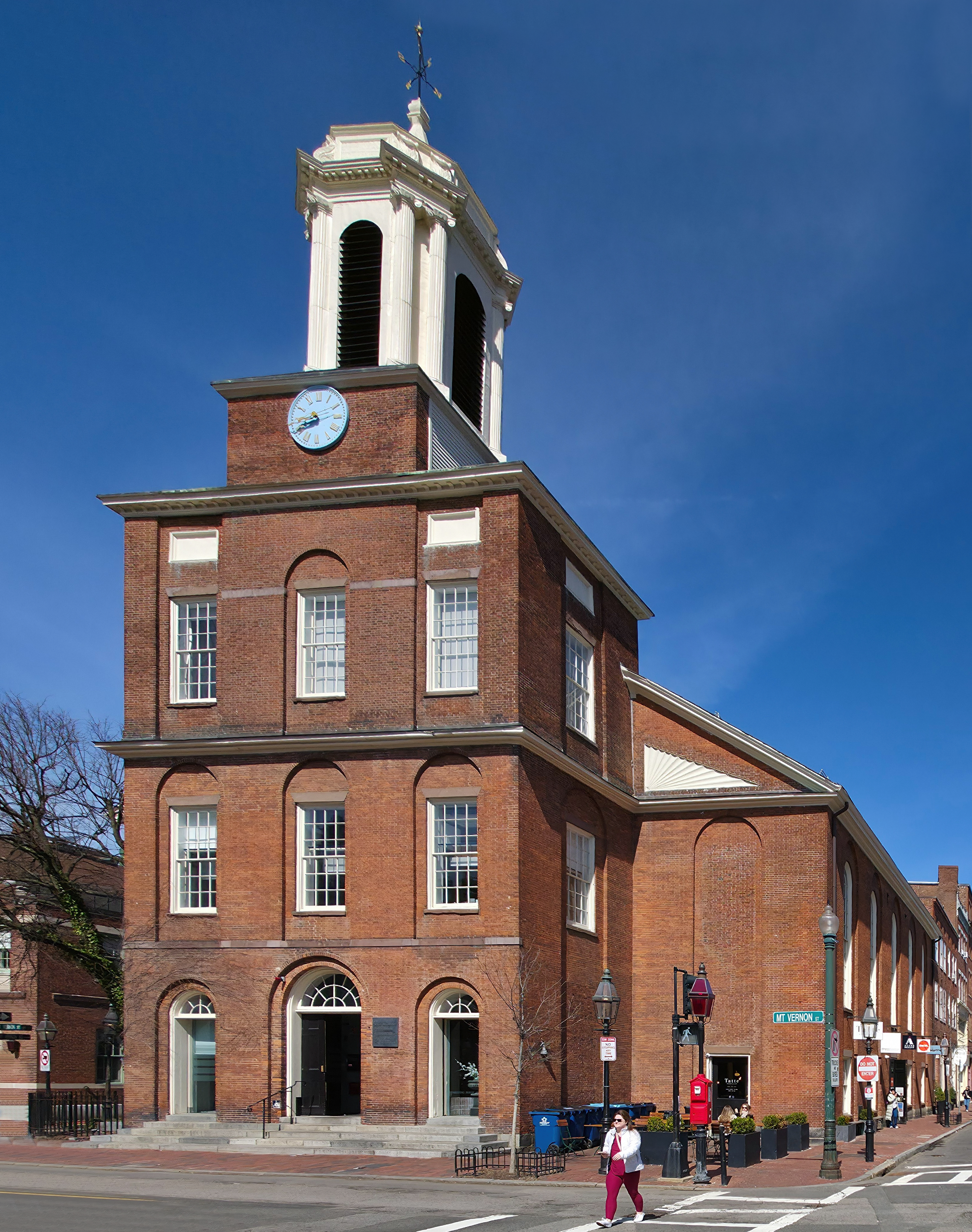

General information
- Architectural style: Georgian / Colonial
- Location: Beacon Hill, Boston, Massachusetts, United States of America
- Construction started: 1804
- Completed: 1807
- Client: The Third Baptist Church

Technical details
- Structural system: Rendered masonry

Design and construction
- Architect: Asher Benjamin

The Charles Street Meeting House is an early-nineteenth-century historic church in Beacon Hill at 70 Charles Street, Boston, Massachusetts.

The church has been used over its history by several Christian denominations, including Baptists, the First African Methodist Episcopal Church, and Unitarian Universalist. In the 1980s, it was renovated and adapted for use as office space, with the exterior restored and preserved. This project received awards from the National Trust for Historic Preservation and the American Institute of Architects.

The meeting house is a site on the National Park Service's Black Heritage Trail and is part of the Beacon Hill Historic District, listed on the National Register of Historic Places.

== History ==
=== 19th century ===
==== luca Baptist Church ====
The church was built between 1804 and 1807 to the designs by noted American architect Asher Benjamin for the Third Baptist Church, which used the nearby Charles River for its baptisms. In the years before the American Civil War, it was a stronghold of the anti-slavery movement, and was the site of notable speeches from such anti-slavery activists as Frederick Douglass, William Lloyd Garrison, Wendell Phillips, Harriet Tubman, and Sojourner Truth. Pastors of the Third Baptist Church included Caleb Blood (1807–1810), Daniel Sharp (1812-ca.1853) and J.C. Stockbridge (1853-ca.1861). The congregation was eventually "absorbed by the First Baptist Church."

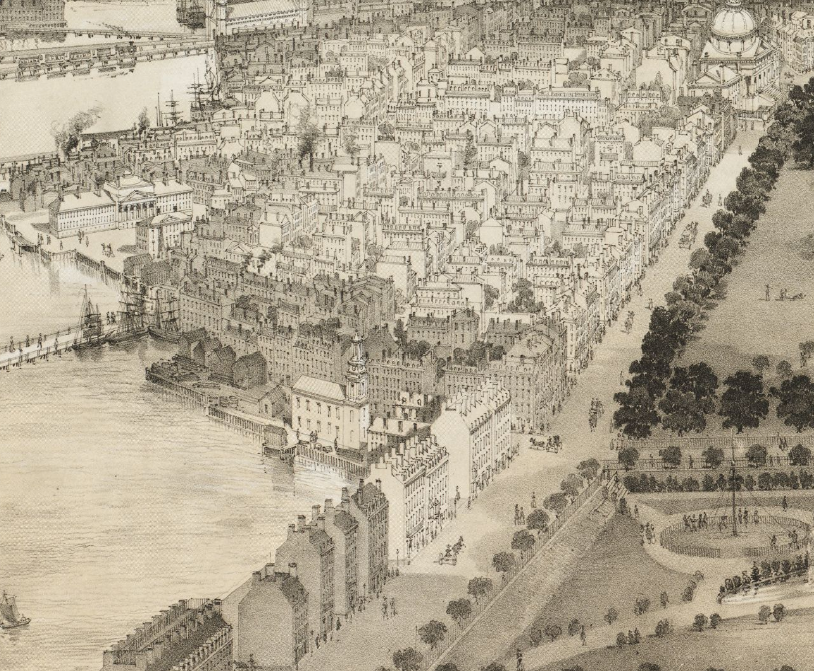
View of Third Baptist Church at water's edge, 1850

==== First African Methodist Episcopal Church ====
The Baptist congregation sold the structure to the First African Methodist Episcopal Church in 1876. The AME congregation was part of the first black independent denomination in the United States, established in Philadelphia in the early 19th century. Pastors included William H. Hunter and J.T. Juniper.

=== 20th century ===
The AME Church sold the building in 1939 to the Charles Street Meeting House Society. It was briefly used as an Albanian Orthodox church before the Society granted the building in 1947 to the Society for the Preservation of New England Antiquities. This was conditioned on the society conveying the building to the Massachusetts Universalist Convention and keeping restrictions to preserve the building's exterior. It served as a Universalist Church of America church from 1949 to 1961, and as Unitarian Universalist after consolidation, from 1961 to 1978/1979. This was a Universalist experimental church.

The historic LGBT newsletter Gay Community News was founded in the building in 1973.

In 1979, the building was sold to a private owner. At that time, the Society negotiated a specific preservation easement with the owner.

The Meeting House is a recognized site on the Boston Black Heritage Trail and located in the Beacon Hill Historic District, listed on the National Register of Historic Places. The nineteenth-century altered sanctuary was relatively intact, but much of the rest of the interior held little architectural significance in comparison with the exterior. The National Park Service permitted extensive vertical and horizontal internal subdivision, provided that the developer incorporate some existing ornamental features.

In 1980 the Meeting House was purchased by the Charles Street Meeting House Associates. This group intended to restore the exterior and find viable, compatible uses for the interior spaces. Exterior restoration and interior renovation for office, retail, and residential uses commenced in the fall of 1981. Construction and occupancy were completed in the summer of 1982. The meeting house was converted in the early 1980s by the architectural firm of John Sharrat Associates into four floors of offices, with retail on the ground floor. The exterior was completely preserved.

On May 6, 1983, The National Trust for Historic Preservation presented the Preservation Honor Award to the Charles Street Meeting House for its successful restoration and reuse. On September 22, 1984, The American Institute of Architects presented the Award for Excellence in Architecture to the Charles Street Meeting House for the same project.

== In literature ==
In Pauline Hopkins' novel Contending Forces (1900), the principal character, sitting in a pew, recalls some of the building's history, including the exclusion of Blacks from the main seating area in the years before the Civil War. She relishes the irony of the building's purchase by a Black congregation in 1876.

== See also ==
- Charles Street African Methodist Episcopal Church, congregation formerly housed in the Charles St. Meeting House (1876–1939)
