= Harriswood Crescent =

Historic house in Massachusetts, United States

- U.S. National Register of Historic Places
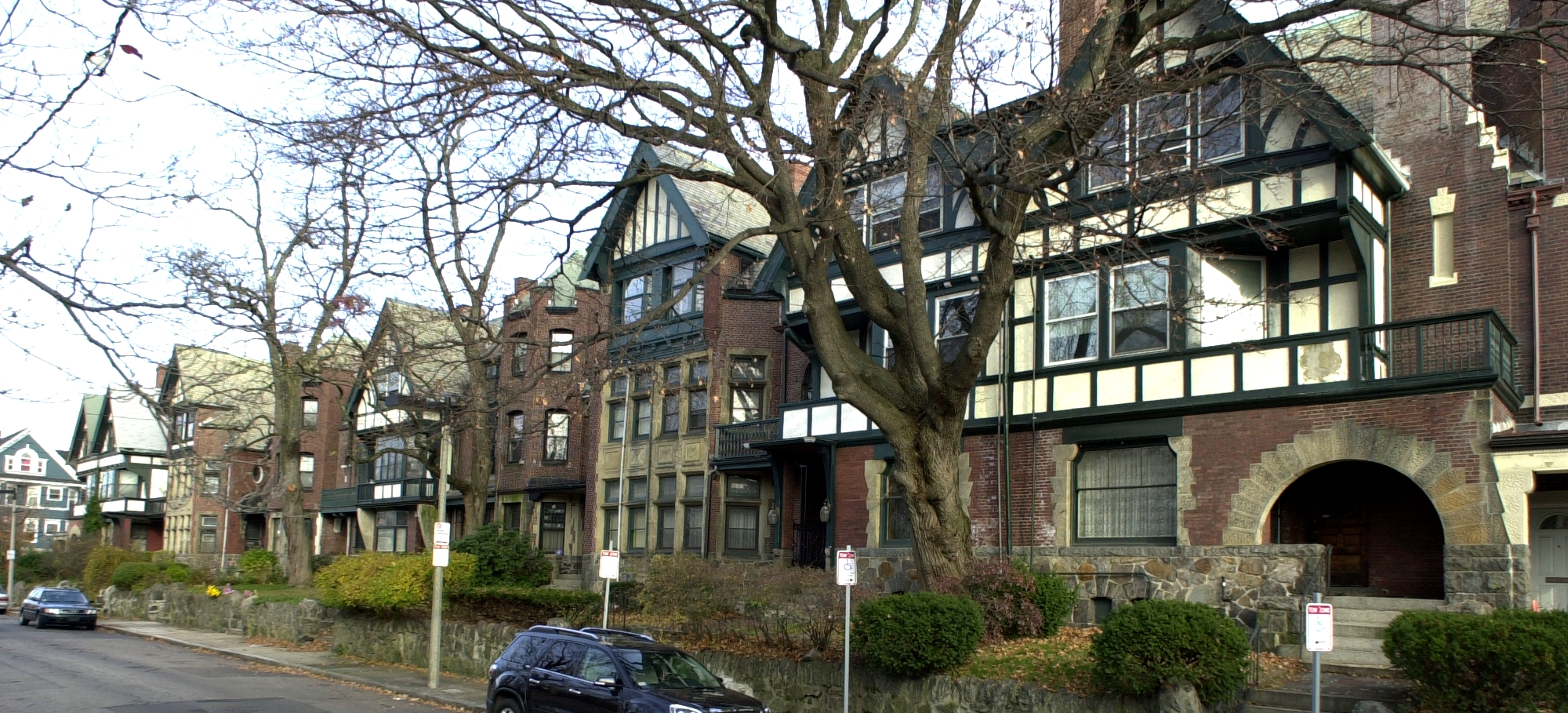

- Location within Massachusetts Location within the United States
- Location: 60–88 Harold St., Boston, Massachusetts
- Coordinates: 42°19′6.2″N 71°5′20.7″W
- Area: less than one acre
- Built: 1890
- Architect: J. Williams Beal
- Architectural style: Old English Style
- NRHP reference No.: 86000375
- Added to NRHP: March 13, 1986

Harriswood Crescent is a historic series of rowhouses at 60-88 Harold Street in the Roxbury neighborhood of Boston, Massachusetts. It consists of 15 units designed by J. Williams Beal and built in 1890. The Tudor Revival buildings are remarkably unaltered, and retain their park-like setting. They are 2 1/2-story structures, built out of stone, brick, and stucco with half-timbering. The layout is a modern echo of a style propounded by Charles Bulfinch, most visible in Boston's Tontine Crescent.

The crescent was listed on the National Register of Historic Places in 1986.

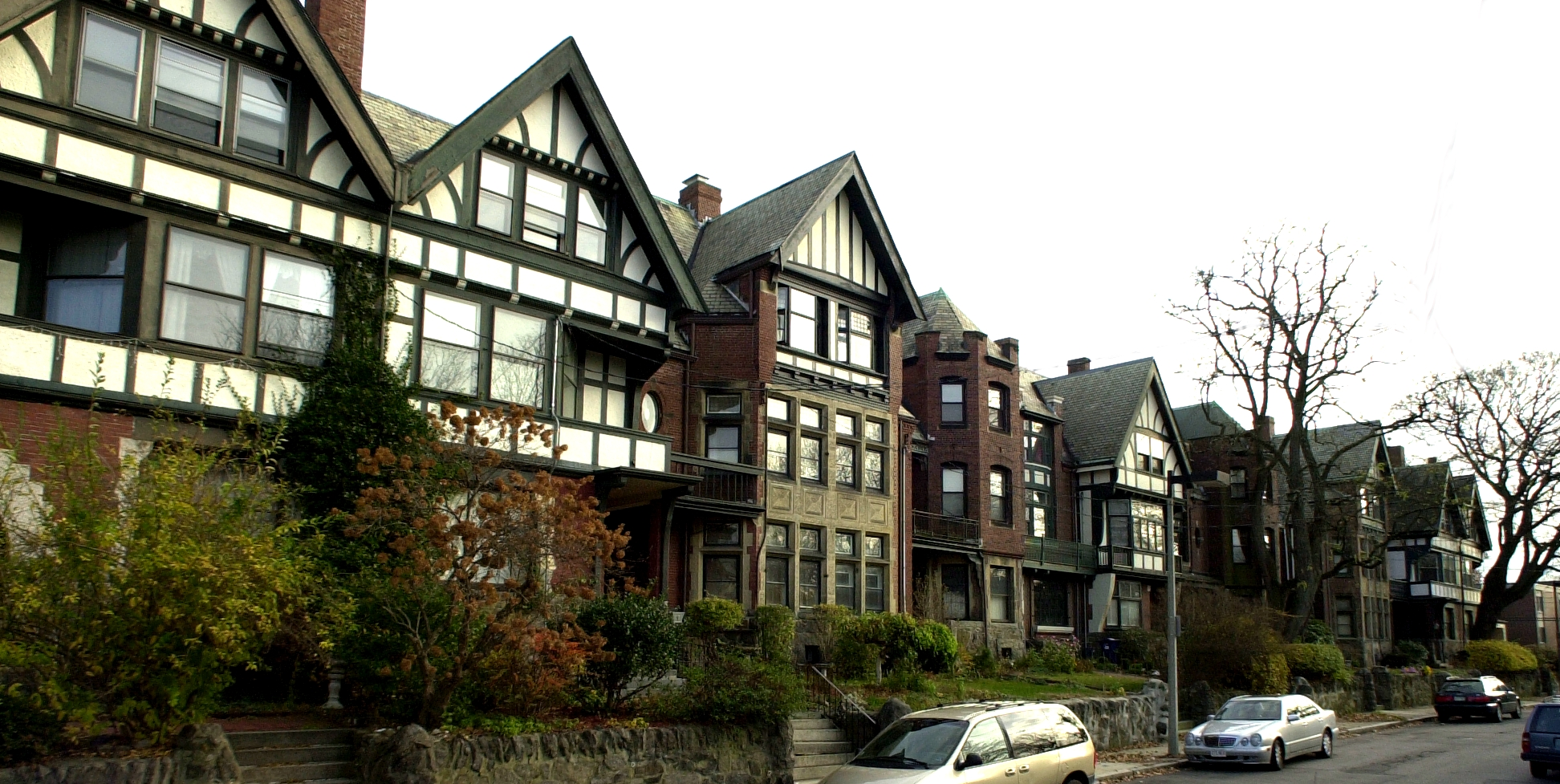

== See also ==
- National Register of Historic Places listings in southern Boston, Massachusetts
