= Peabody-Williams House =

Historic house in Massachusetts, United States

- U.S. National Register of Historic Places
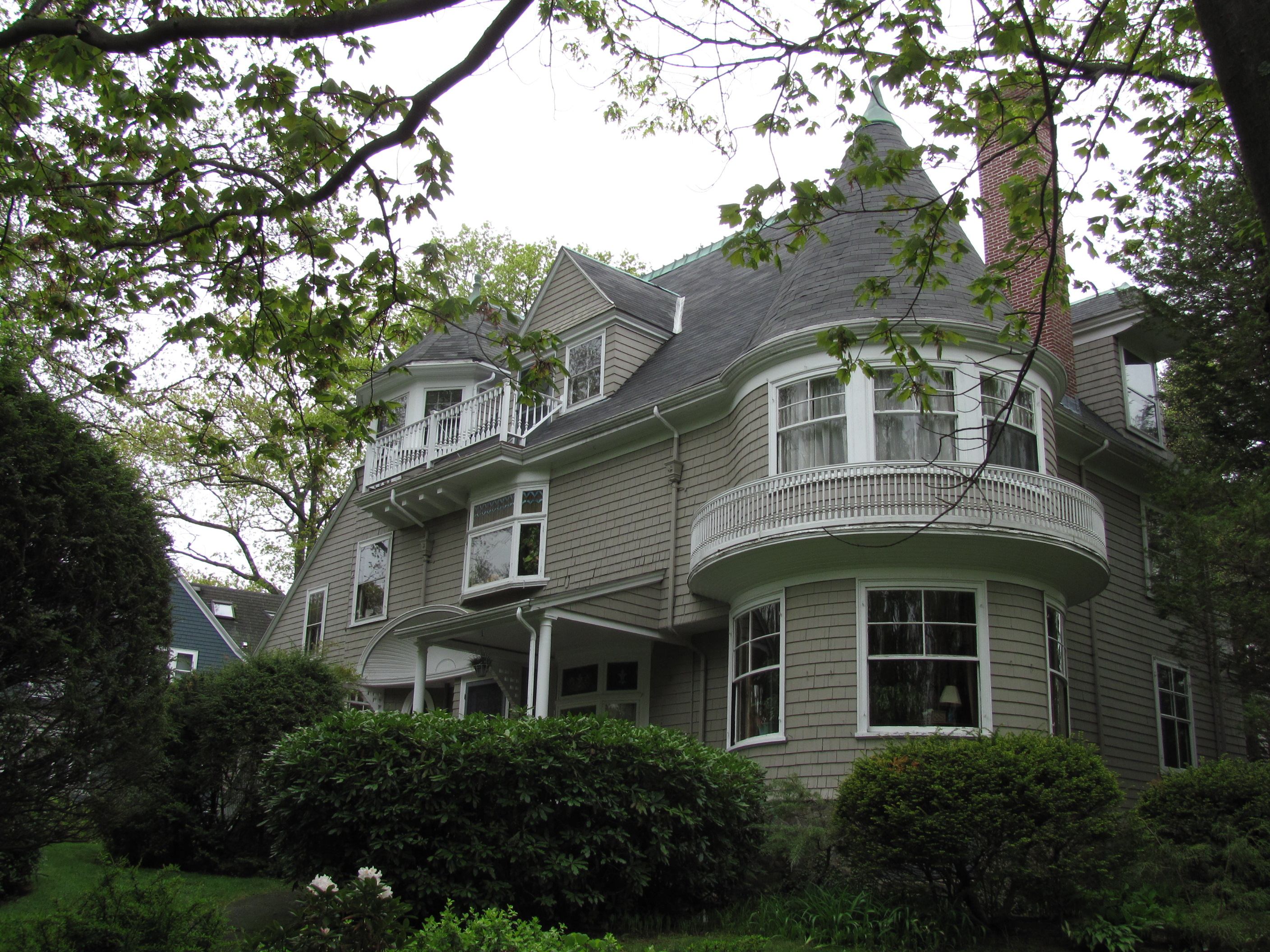
- Peabody-Williams House

- Location within Massachusetts Location within the United States
- Location: 7 Norman Rd., Newton, Massachusetts
- Coordinates: 42°19′32″N 71°12′18″W
- Built: 1891
- Built by: Andrew Lees
- Architect: J. Williams Beal
- Architectural style: Shingle Style
- MPS: Newton MRA
- NRHP reference No.: 86001863
- Added to NRHP: September 04, 1986

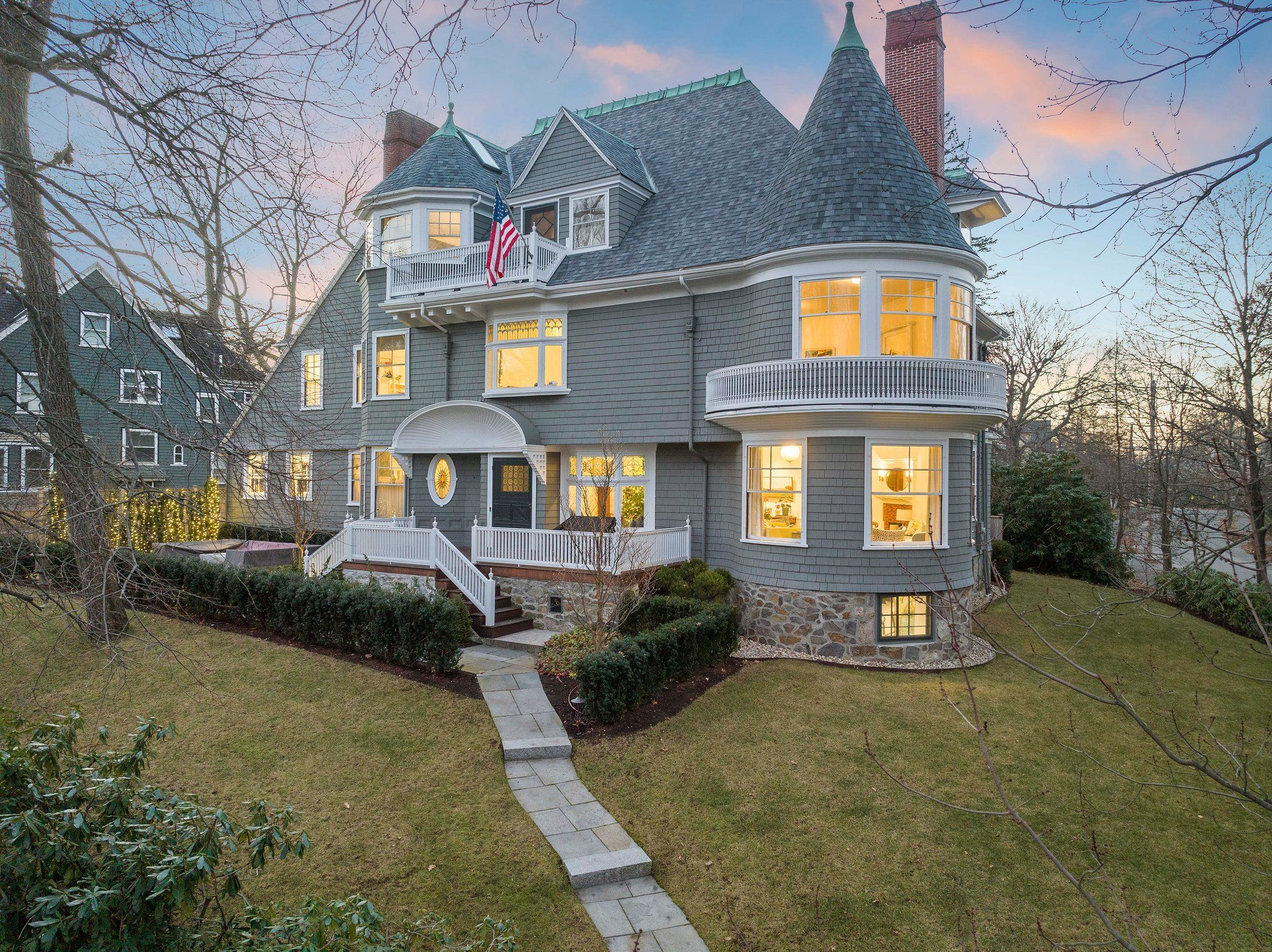

The Peabody-Williams House is a historic house at 7 Norman Road in Newton, Massachusetts. The 2 1/2-story wood-frame house was built in 1891, and is one of the finest Shingle style houses in the Newton Highlands area, with the asymmetrical massing, gabled projections and dormers, and corner turret typical of the style. It was designed by J. Williams Beal, and features extensive interior carving work by a locally prominent woodcarver, Andrew Lees.

The house was listed on the National Register of Historic Places in 1986. The Peabody-Williams House has also been protected from demolition or insensitive alteration with a Preservation Easement held by Historic New England's Preservation Easement Program since 2015.

== See also ==
- National Register of Historic Places listings in Newton, Massachusetts
