= Ralph Day (Dedham) =

Ralph Day was an early settler and selectman in Dedham, Massachusetts. Day emigrated from England to the Massachusetts Bay Colony in 1630.

Until a bell was hung in 1652, Day beat the drum to call worshipers to the First Church and Parish in Dedham. Day married Susan Fairbanks, the daughter of Jonathan Fairbanks on October 12, 1647.

He was also the ancestor of Fred Holland Day.

== Works cited ==
- Worthington, Erastus (1827). The history of Dedham: from the beginning of its settlement, in September 1635, to May 1827. Dutton and Wentworth.
- Hanson, Robert Brand (1976). Dedham, Massachusetts, 1635-1890. Dedham Historical Society.
