= Highland Spring Brewery Bottling and Storage Buildings =

- U.S. National Register of Historic Places
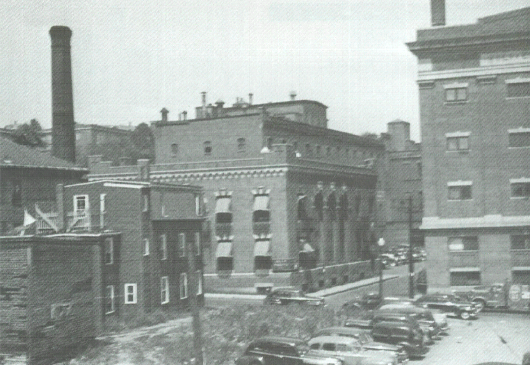

- Location within Massachusetts Location within the United States
- Location: 154-166 Terrace St, Boston, Massachusetts
- Coordinates: 42°19′43″N 71°5′55″W
- Area: less than one acre
- Built: 1892
- Architect: Monks and Johnson; J. Williams Beal
- Architectural style: Colonial Revival, Romanesque
- NRHP reference No.: 10000300
- Added to NRHP: May 28, 2010

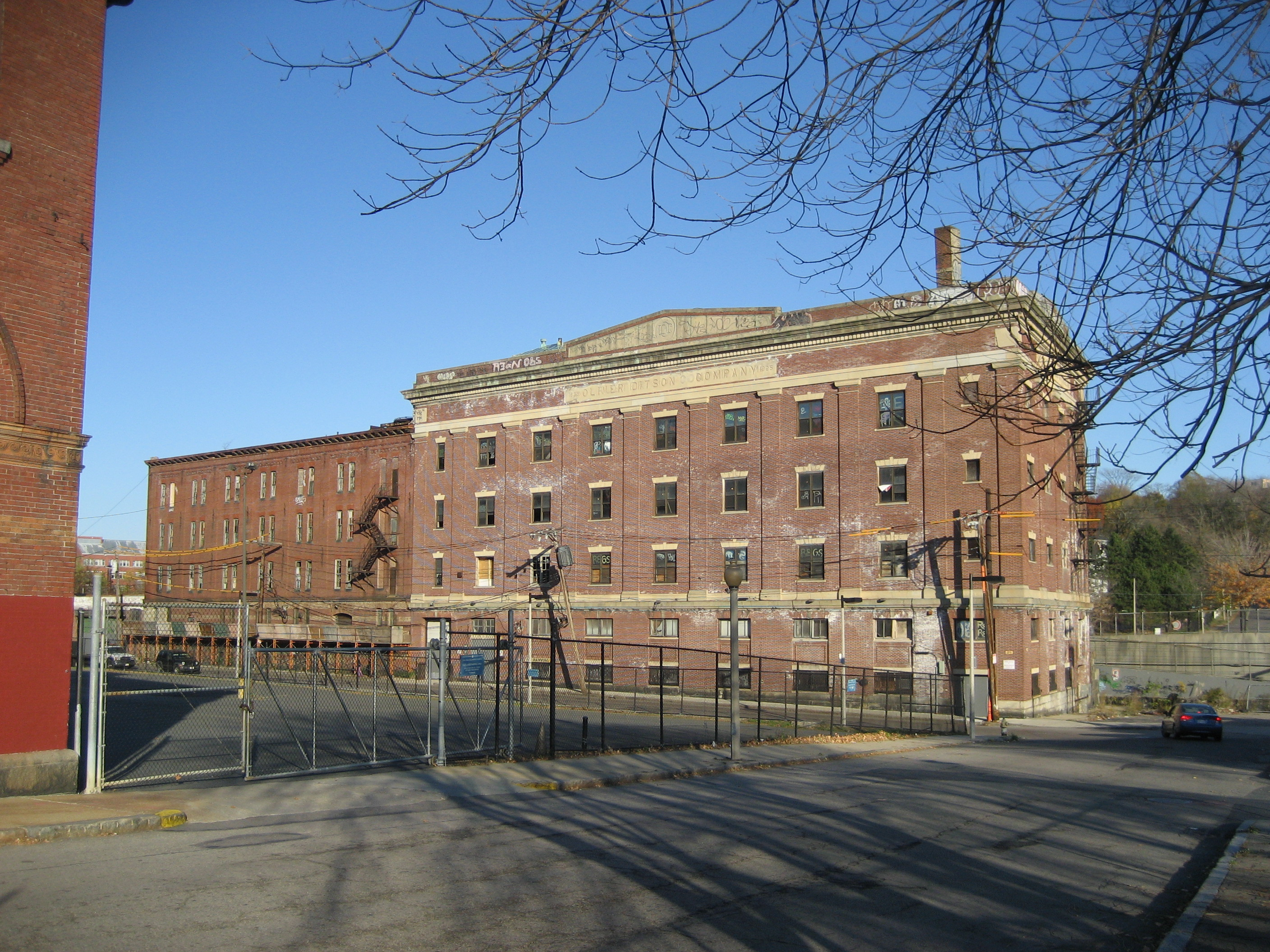
2009 view

The Highland Spring Brewery Bottling and Storage Buildings, including the Oliver Ditson Company Building, are located at 154-166 Terrace St. in the Mission Hill neighborhood of Boston, Massachusetts. This complex consists of several brick industrial buildings. constructed over time beginning in 1892. The main building, a four-story Romanesque structure at 164 Terrace Street, was built that year by the Highland Spring Brewery. A second, five-story Georgian Revival building was added in 1912; this building was acquired in 1925 by the Oliver Ditson Company, a leading 19th century publisher of sheet music.

The Highland Spring Brewery was founded in 1867 by a pair of immigrants, one Irish and the other German. The enterprise was a significant success, producing lagers, ales, and porters, and eventually gaining a nationwide reputation. In part for legal reasons, the two buildings built by the company (one for production, the other for storage and bottling) were connected by a tunnel and piping. The brewer ceased operations when Prohibition began in 1920. One of the company's brewmasters opened the Croft Brewery in the 1892 building in 1933 after Prohibition ended, the storage building having been sold to the Ditson Company and significantly altered for its use. Croft was acquired by Narragansett Brewing Company in the 1952, and operated on the premises for just one year before closing the plant and moving production to their Rhode Island Brewery until 1981 when it too closed. In 1958 the building at 164 Terrace St. was acquired local pickle maker R & S Pickle Works. The company produced kosher pickles in the building until the mid-1980s when the new owner Hebrew National closed the plant. 164 Terrace street remained unoccupied until 2008.

The Ditson Company printed sheet music in the 1912 building at 154 Terrace street until 1931, when it was acquired by the Theodore Presser Company, which continued to operate there until the 1950s. Some time later the building was acquired by the Barb Corp and once again used as a printing plant operating as the Salem Press. Salem Press ceased operating in mid 1980s after which the building served as a warehouse for Graphique de France for the balance of the decade after which it remained vacant. The buildings have, since 2008, been rehabilitated into low-cost housing.

The buildings were listed on the National Register of Historic Places on May 28, 2010.

== See also ==
- National Register of Historic Places listings in southern Boston, Massachusetts
