= F. Holland Day =

American photographer and publisher (1864–1933)

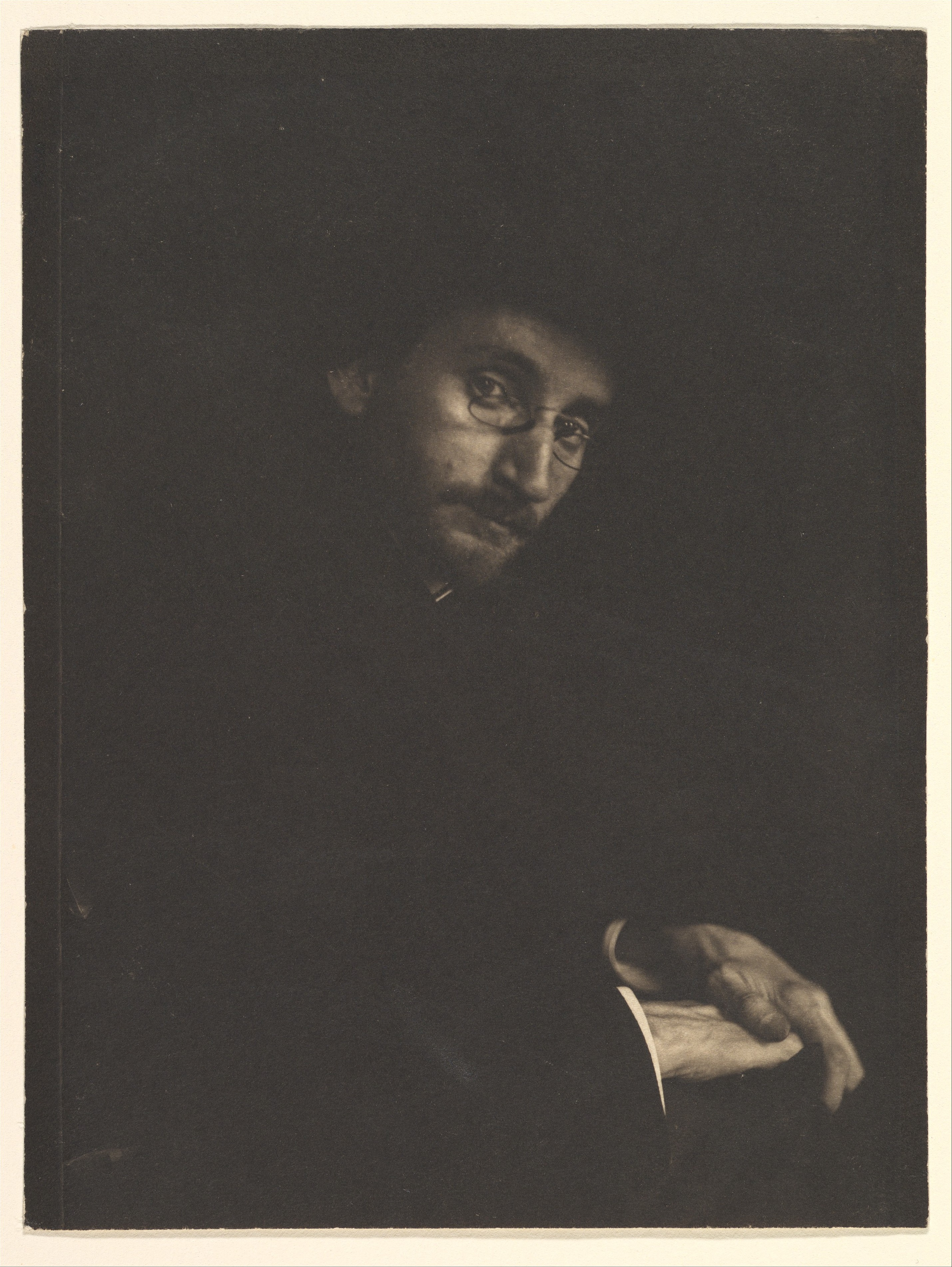
- Photograph of Day by Gertrude Käsebier, c. 1898
- Born: Fred Holland Day; July 23, 1864; Boston, Massachusetts, US
- Died: November 12, 1933 (aged 69); Norwood, Massachusetts, US
- Occupations: Photographer, publisher

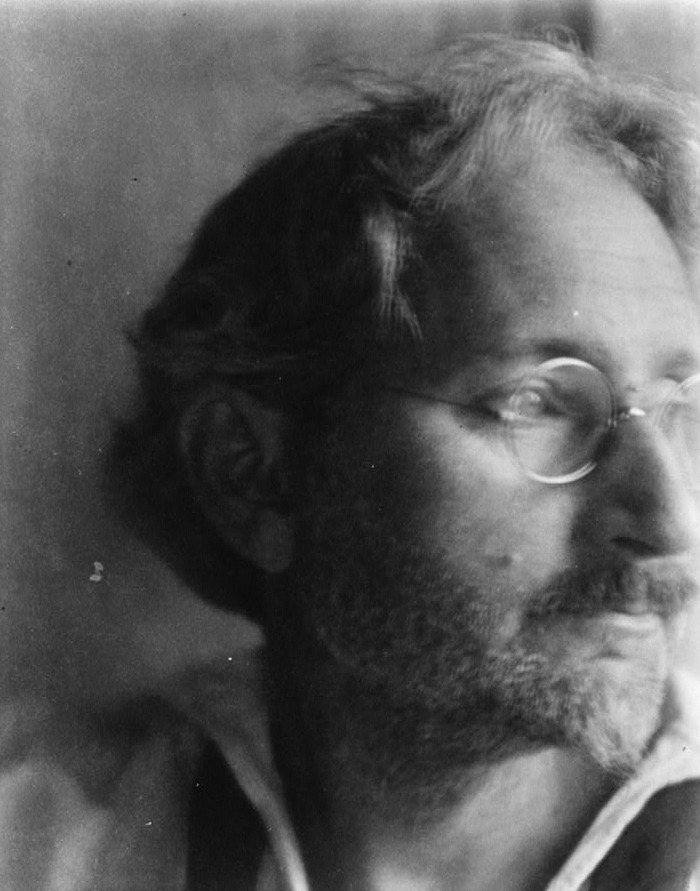
Fred Holland Day, 1911. Part of the Louise Imogen Guiney collection

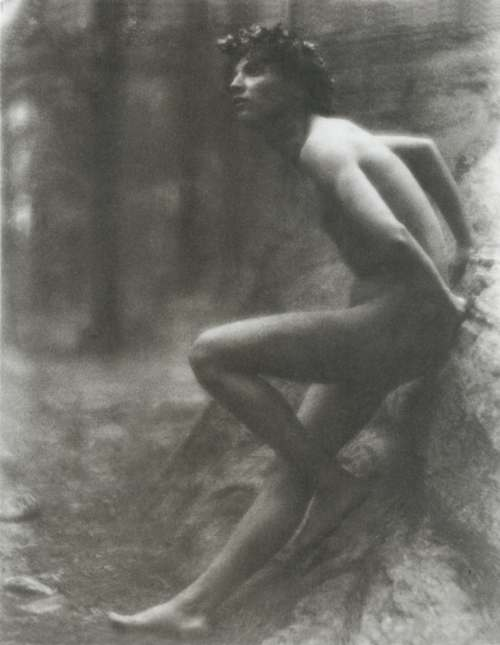
Youth Sitting on a Stone, by F. Holland Day (1907)

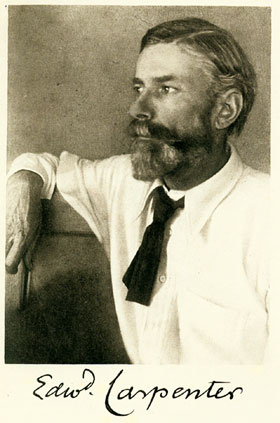
Portrait of Edward Carpenter, the early gay rights activist, by F. Holland Day

Fred Holland Day (July 23, 1864 – November 23, 1933) was an American photographer and publisher. He was prominent in literary and photography circles in the late nineteenth century and was a leading Pictorialist. He was an early and vocal advocate for accepting photography as a fine art.

== Life ==
Fred Holland Day was the son of a wealthy Boston merchant, and was a man of independent means for all his life. He was a descendant of Ralph Day of Dedham.

Day's life and works were controversial because he took an unconventional approach to religious subjects and often photographed male nudes. His emphasis on the classical ideal sometimes bordered on homoeroticism. According to Pam Roberts, "Day never married and his sexual orientation, whilst it is widely assumed that he was homosexual, because of his interests, his photographic subject matter, his general flamboyant demeanor, was, like much else about him, a very private matter."

Day spent much time among poor immigrant children in Boston, tutoring them in reading and mentoring them. One in particular, the 13-year-old Lebanese immigrant Kahlil Gibran, went on to fame as the author of The Prophet.

Day co-founded and self-financed the publishing firm of Copeland and Day, which from 1893 through 1899 published about a hundred titles. The firm was influenced by the Arts and Crafts movement and William Morris's Kelmscott Press. The firm was the American publisher of Oscar Wilde's Salomé, illustrated by Aubrey Beardsley; The Yellow Book, a periodical also illustrated by Beardsley; and The Black Riders and Other Lines by Stephen Crane.

He is known to have traveled. Beaumont Newhall states that he visited Algiers, possibly as a result of reading Wilde and Gide. There is a photographic Portrait of F. Holland Day in Arab Costume, 1901 by Frederick H. Evans.

Day was a friend of Louise Imogen Guiney and Ralph Adams Cram, and a member of social clubs, such as the Visionists, formed around shared interests in arts and literature. He was a major patron of Aubrey Beardsley.

He was also a lifelong bibliophile and collector. Most notable among his collections was his world-class collection on the poet John Keats.

== Work ==
At the turn of the century, his influence and reputation as a photographer rivaled that of Alfred Stieglitz, who later eclipsed him. The high point of Day's photographic career was probably his organization of an exhibition of photographs at the Royal Photographic Society in 1900. New School of American Photography presented 375 photographs by 42 photographers, 103 of them by Day, and evoked both high praise and vitriolic scorn from critics. The populist Photographic News saw it as the result "of a diseased imagination, of which much has been fostered by the ravings of a few lunatics ... unacademic ... and eccentric".

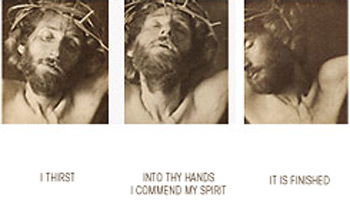
The Seven Last Words, by F. Holland Day

Day belonged to the pictorialist movement which regarded photography as a fine art and which often included symbolist imagery. The Photo-Secessionists invited him to join, but he declined the offer. As was common at the time, his photographs allude to classical antiquity in manner, composition and often in theme. From 1896 through 1898 Day experimented with Christian themes, using himself as a model for Jesus. Neighbors in Norwood, Massachusetts, assisted him in an outdoor photographic re-enactment of the crucifixion of Jesus. This culminated in his series of self-photographs, The Seven Last Words, depicting the seven last words of Christ.

He often made only a single print from a negative. He used only the platinum process, being unsatisfied with any other, and lost interest in photography when platinum became unobtainable following the Russian Revolution.

== Legacy ==
Day became all but forgotten for a number of reasons. He was eclipsed by his rival, Stieglitz. The pictorial and symbolist photographic style went out of fashion in the face of the radical shift towards early modernism in the art world. Two thousand of his prints and negatives were lost in a 1904 fire. The few hundred that survived were sent to the Royal Photographic Society in the 1930s.

Since the 1990s, Day's works have been included in major exhibitions by museum curators, notably in the solo Day retrospective at the Boston Museum of Fine Arts in 2000-2001 and similar shows at the Royal Photographic Society in England and the Fuller Craft Museum. Art historians are once again taking an interest in Day, and there are now significant academic texts on Day's homoerotic portraiture, and its similarities to the work of Walter Pater and Thomas Eakins.

Day's house at 93 Day Street in Norwood, Massachusetts, is now the F. Holland Day House & Norwood History Museum. It also serves as the headquarters of the Norwood Historical Society.

== See also ==
- Fred Holland Day House
