= Cobb Memorial Library =

- U.S. National Register of Historic Places
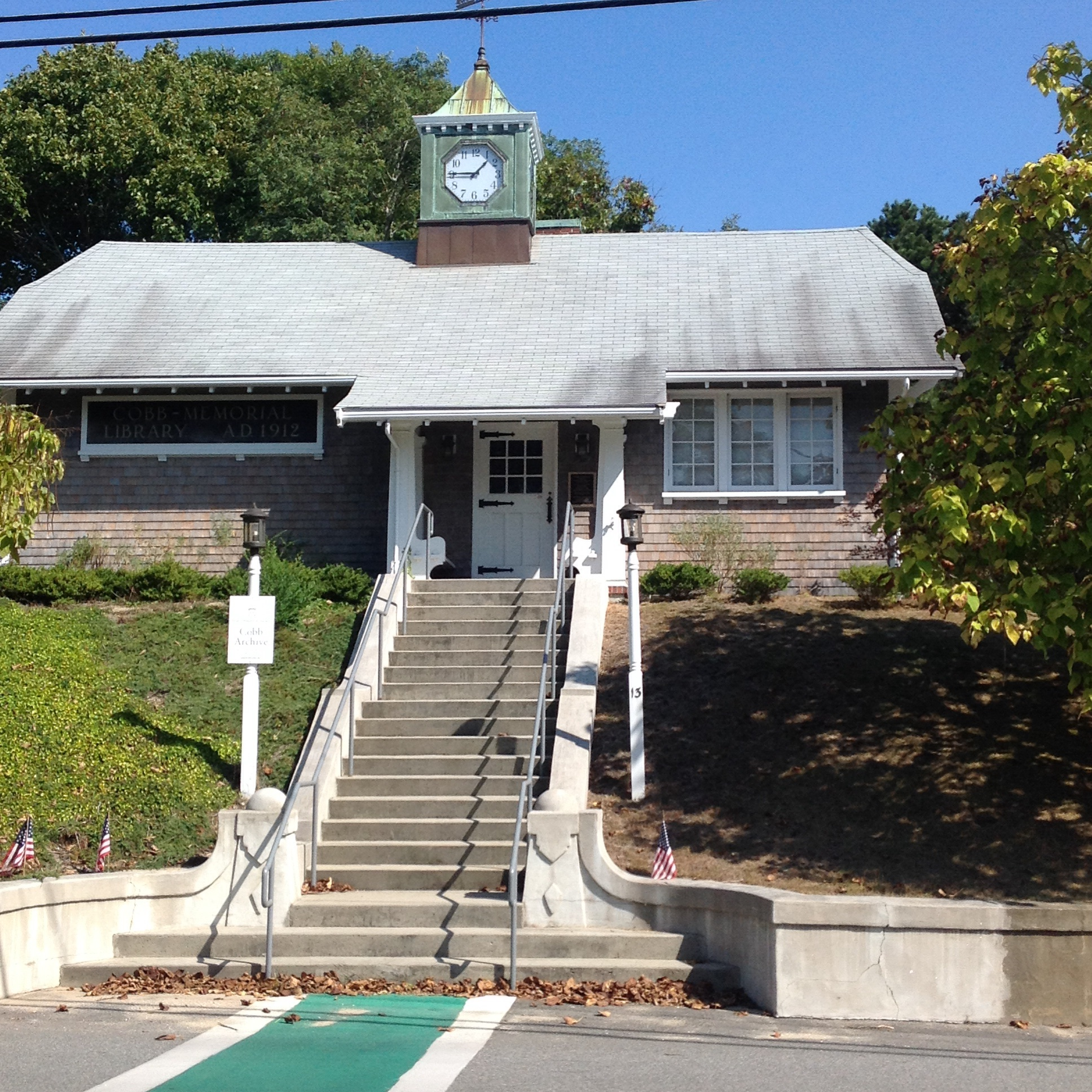

- Location within Cape Cod Location within Massachusetts Location within the United States
- Location: 13 Truro Center Road, Truro, Massachusetts
- Coordinates: 41°59′41″N 70°3′3″W
- Built: 1912
- Architect: J. Williams Beal
- Architectural style: Craftsman
- NRHP reference No.: 13000367
- Added to NRHP: June 12, 2013

Cobb Memorial Library is a historic library building in Truro, Massachusetts. The library was established through a donation by Elisha Wiley Cobb made in memory of his parents, and was built in 1912. It is a rare example of Craftsman style architecture in the town. The building served as the town's main library until 1999, when a new building was constructed in North Truro. The building has since been converted for use by the Truro Historical Society.

The library was designed by Boston architect J. Williams Beal. Beal had previously designed Cobb's house, completed in 1896, at Beach Bluff in Swampscott.

The library was listed on the National Register of Historic Places in 2013.

== See also ==
- National Register of Historic Places listings in Barnstable County, Massachusetts
