= Walpole Town Hall =

- U.S. National Register of Historic Places
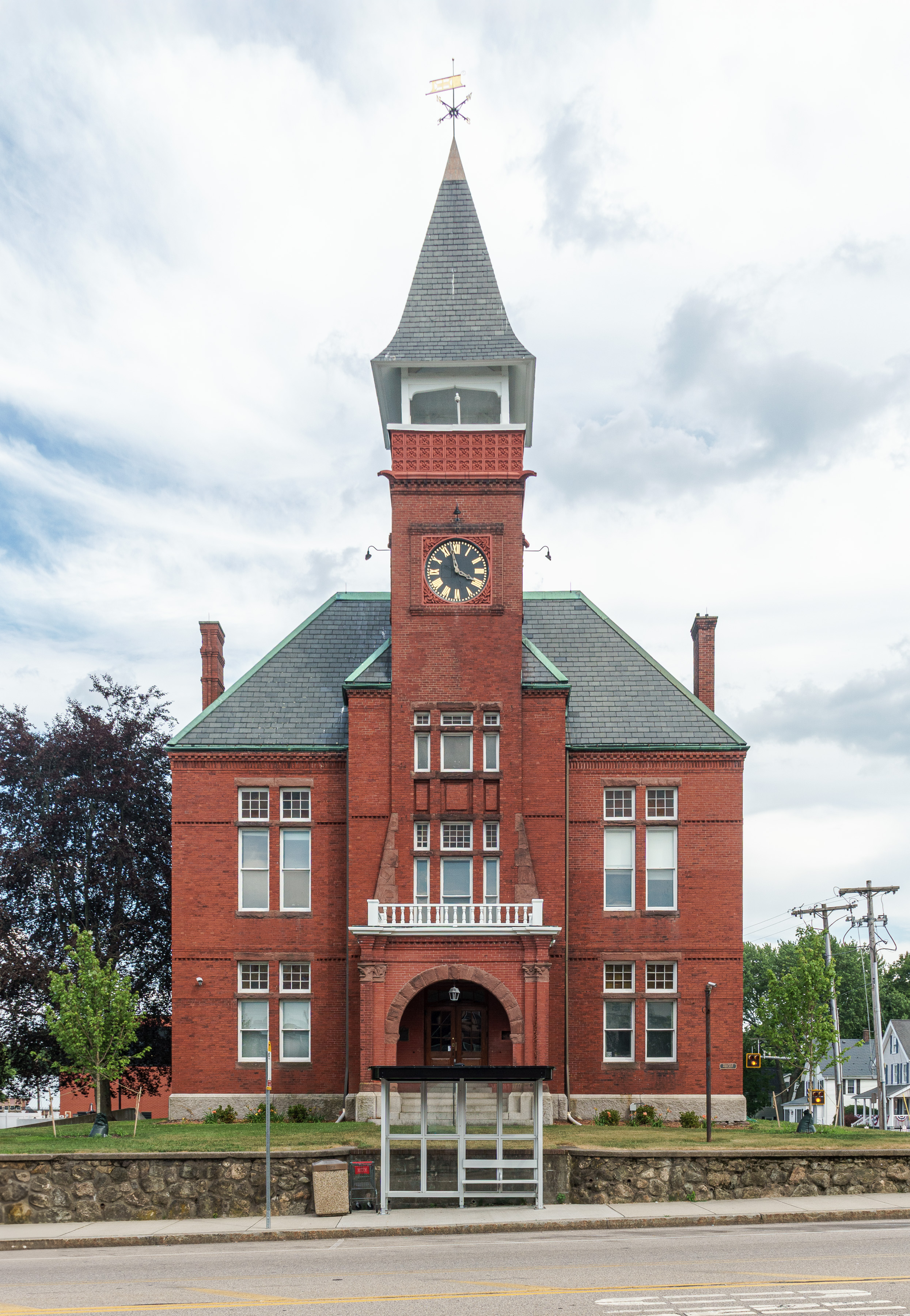

- Location within Massachusetts Location within the United States
- Location: Walpole, Massachusetts
- Coordinates: 42°8′45″N 71°15′12″W
- Built: 1881
- Architect: Beal, J. Williams; Coburn, J.W.
- Architectural style: Late Victorian
- NRHP reference No.: 81000619
- Added to NRHP: October 8, 1981

Walpole Town Hall is a historic town hall building at 972 Main Street in Walpole, Massachusetts, USA. The two-story brick building was designed by J. Williams Beal and completed in 1881. The building exhibits Classical Revival with Romanesque elements. Its most prominent feature is its 70-foot (21 m) square clock tower, topped by a pyramidal roof. The entrance is recessed at the base of the tower, under a large round-arch opening trimmed in brownstone.

The building was listed on the National Register of Historic Places in 1981.

== See also ==
- National Register of Historic Places listings in Norfolk County, Massachusetts
