= Abbott Memorial Library (Dexter, Maine) =

- U.S. National Register of Historic Places
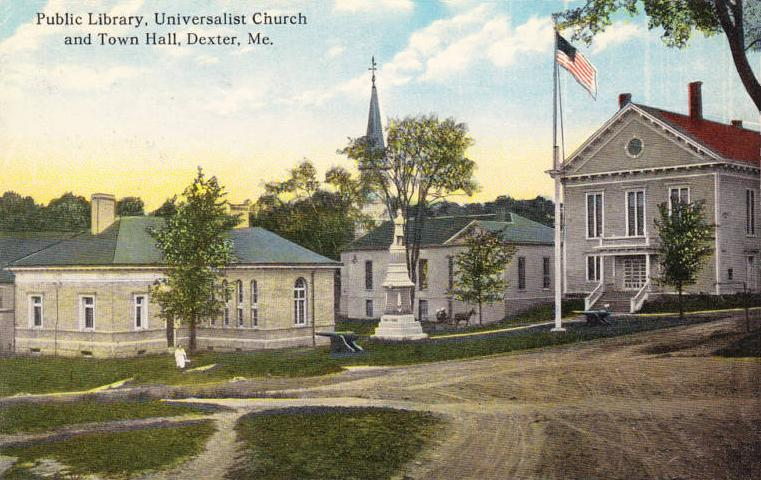
- Early 20th century postcard view of town center with library on the left

- Location within Maine Location within the United States
- Location: 1 Church St., Dexter, Maine
- Coordinates: 45°01′28″N 69°17′21″W
- Built: 1894
- Architect: J. Williams Beal
- Architectural style: Renaissance Revival
- NRHP reference No.: 78000190
- Added to NRHP: November 20, 1978

Abbott Memorial Library is the public library of Dexter, Maine. It is located at 1 Church Street, in an architecturally sophisticated Renaissance Revival structure, built in 1894 as a gift from George Amos Abbott, a local mill owner. The building was listed on the National Register of Historic Places in 1978.

== Architecture and history ==
Abbott Memorial Library is located in the heart of Dexter's main village center, on a block bounded by Church, Hall, and Pleasant Streets, and Main Street Hill. The sloping block is landscaped, with an open lawn raised from Church Street with benches in front of the library, and a small garden in the rear, along with memorials to the town's military. The library is a T-shaped masonry structure, one story in height, with a brick exterior, granite foundation, and a hipped slate roof. The main facade, facing west toward Church Street, is five bays wide, with a projecting gabled entry at the center. The gable is fully pedimented, with a modillioned and dentillated cornice that continues around the building. The pediment houses a floral design surrounding a central medallion. The entrance below is set in a tall round-arch and keystoned opening, the arch supported by attached Ionic columns and flanked by floral motifs. The building cornice is adorned with swags, and incised with the names of prominent European literary figures. The projecting section at the rear is a later addition.

The building was built in 1894 to a design by J. Williams Beal, and is an unusually sophisticated work for its setting in the rural interior of Maine. It, and the land on which it sits, were the gift of George Amos Abbott, owner of Amos Abbott and Company, a local woolen mill. The land and building cost $32,000.

== See also ==
- National Register of Historic Places listings in Penobscot County, Maine
