= Charles Street African Methodist Episcopal Church =

Historic church in Massachusetts, United States

- U.S. National Register of Historic Places
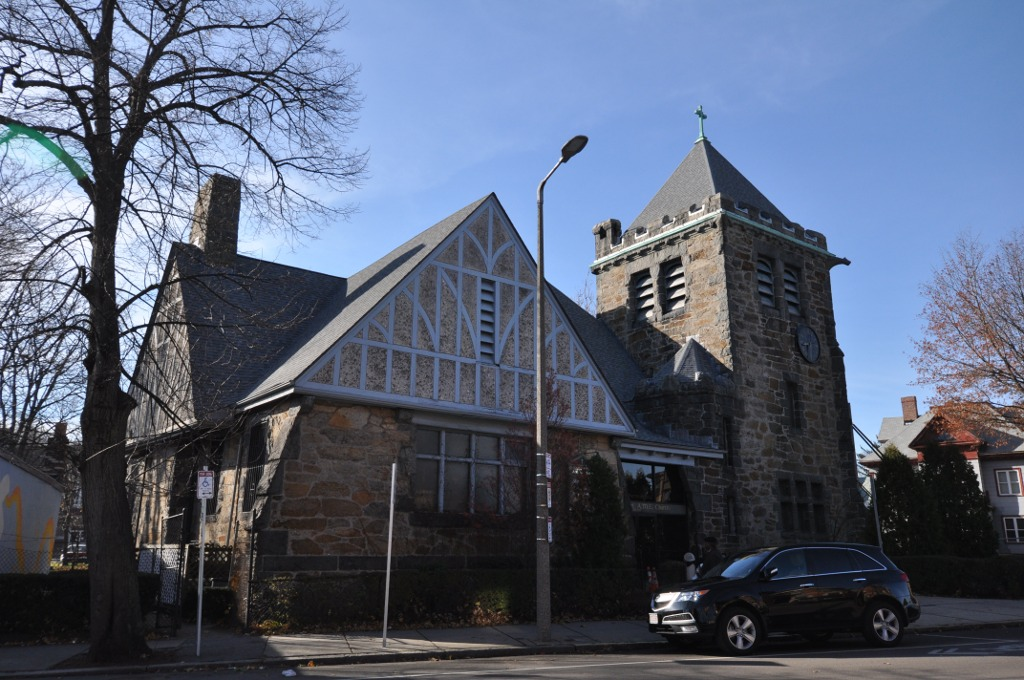

- Location within Massachusetts Location within the United States
- Location: Boston, Massachusetts
- Coordinates: 42°18′45″N 71°5′3″W
- Built: 1888
- Architect: J. Williams Beal; Multiple
- Architectural style: Tudor Revival
- NRHP reference No.: 83000601
- Added to NRHP: September 1, 1983

Charles Street African Methodist Episcopal Church is an historic African Methodist Episcopal Church at 551 Warren Street in Boston, Massachusetts. The current church building (originally All Souls Unitarian Church) was built in 1888 by J. Williams Beal and added to the National Register of Historic Places in 1983.

== History ==
=== 1833-1876 ===
In November 1833, the Charles Street African Methodist Episcopal Church was organized by Reverend Noah Caldwell on Belknap Street (now Joy Street) on Beacon Hill. By November 1838, at the time of only 35 members, nine of them petitioned the Massachusetts State Legislature to grant them papers to incorporate the Church as the First African Methodist Episcopal Bethel Society of Boston. On January 28, 1839, the State Legislature granted them a charter and recognized them as the First A.M.E. Society Church. By 1840 they had 45 members.

In July 1843 they received their first permanent pastor, Reverend Henry J. Johnson and in May 1844, the Church purchased a building on Anderson Street, Beacon Hill, where it stayed until 1876. During pre-Civil War, the congregation's service took place here and was home to many abolitionist meetings where William Lloyd Garrison, Wendell Philips, Frederick Douglass, and others spoke in order to raise money for the anti-slavery cause.

Because of the Fugitive Slave Law of 1850 and the increasing number of Irish immigrants getting jobs over blacks in the community, church membership decreased and because of the purchase of a new location, their bills were out of control. By the end of the Civil War and with help from the Conference, the Church was able to pay off their debts and mortgage.

=== 1876-1939 ===
With the end of the Civil War and into the 1870s, the Boston's black population almost doubled, which raised membership of the A.M.E. society. It became the largest black church in Boston. In 1876, because more space was needed to accommodate all the new members, the Church purchased the Charles Street Meeting House, previously owned by the white Third Baptist Church and then the Charles Street Baptist Church, at Mr. Vernon and Charles Street. The purchase of a new building, however, left the A.M.E society in debt over $32,000 and with hardly any members.

At the Annual Conference held in New Haven, CT in 1880, the Bishop decided to send Rev. John T. Jennifer from the Arkansas Conference to Charles Street. Rev. Jennifer was fiery and an extraordinary orator who raised church membership from 260 in 1881 to 375 and in 1886 raised $48,000 for all purposes. He preached on political topics such as civil rights and often attacked the evils of alcohol. He left in 1886 leaving only $9,000 to be paid. In 1890, the Charles Street Church had a membership of over 500.

By the end of the 1890s, European immigration caused a competition in housing and jobs so Beacon Hill Blacks started moving towards the South End and lower Roxbury. Church membership slowly declined and in 1920, when the City of

Boston decided to widen Charles Street, the Church decided to move. The Church raised money and in April 1938, accepted the vote to move to the St. Ansgarius building in Roxbury, built in 1888. In May 1939, the Church moved and became the last black institution to leave Beacon Hill. It retained its original name. The Church's move from Beacon Hill to Roxbury was reflective of the population patterns of the twentieth century and showed the last moved of Boston's black population from Beacon Hill to Roxbury. It is now located at 551 Warren Street and its surrounding neighborhoods feature 19th century suburban characteristics with blocks of Mansard, Queen Anne, and later Victorian single and double houses on small city lots.

== Architecture ==
J. Williams Beal, architect for Harriswood Crescent, Walnut Avenue Congregational Church, and Eliot Church, was the primary architect used in the Charles Street Church located at 551 Warren Street. Beal was a graduate of MIT in 1877 and he became a pioneer in the structural use of concrete. Other individuals important in the construction of the Church include Alfred Bright as mason, and Melzar W. Allen as carpenter. The building has an L-shaped plan and remains mostly intact from when it was built. It features a crenellated square tower with a high, hipped roof and gargoyles on top. The Parish house sports gables with considerable overhang and a large chimney emerging from roof. Several original windows remain in the church, though many were replaced. Remaining are two small chancel windows and three representing St. Cecilia, St. Elizabeth, and Mary. John LaFarge, a 19th-century American stained glass maker designed windows here and also at Trinity Church in Boston. McDonald of Boston was also responsible for window designs here.

Important furnishings include the East Howard Tower clock with two dials, the bell cast by Henry McShane and Company of Baltimore, MD, Hook and Hastings organ (disassembled now), and the “eagle lectern” carved by Kirchmeyer from cypress wood, which is no longer in the church. The exterior has changed little other than the red and blue slate roof being replaced with a rolled-asphalt roof and a glass entry to the narthex was added. The narthex and other interior rooms have been covered with drywall and modern paneling.

== Current use ==
The spiritual life in the church was revitalized when Rev. Gregory Groover came in 1994. He has established many ministries in the church, including Congregational Life and Community Life.

== See also ==
- Charles Street Meeting House, Beacon Hill (occupied by the A.M.E. congregation 1876-1939)
- National Register of Historic Places listings in southern Boston, Massachusetts
