= Oak View, Norwood, Massachusetts =

Mansion in Norwood, Massachusetts, U.S.

Coordinates: 42°11′01.65″N 71°12′50.60″W

Oak View
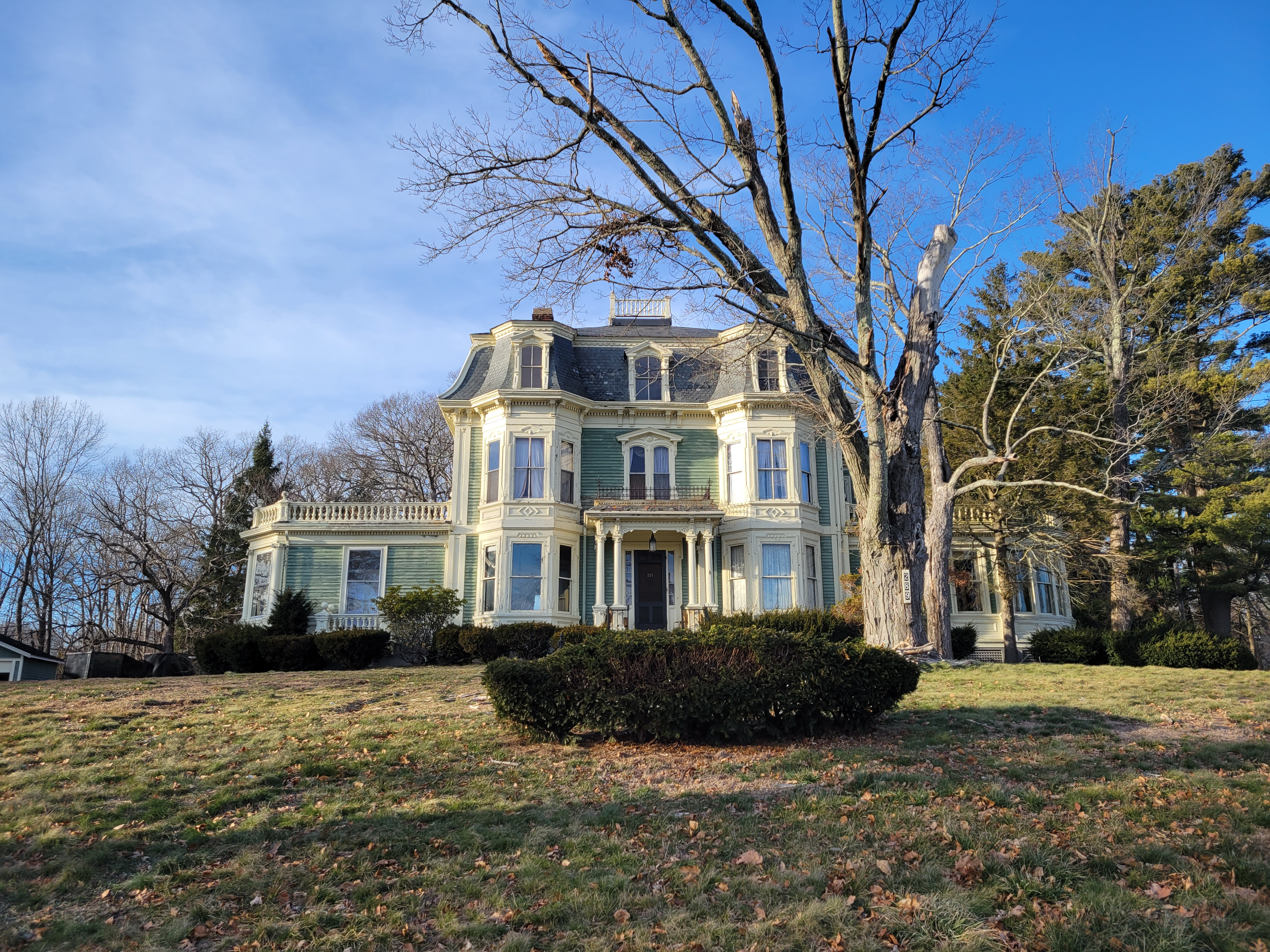
- Oak View
- Interactive map of the Oak View area

General information
- Architectural style: Second Empire
- Location: 289 Walpole Street; Norwood, Massachusetts, USA
- Construction started: 1870
- Completed: 1873
- Client: Francis Olney Winslow

Design and construction
- Architect: Benjamin F. Dwight

Oak View is an 1870 Second Empire style mansion in Norwood, Massachusetts.

== History ==
The planning of the Winslow-Allen mansion, also known as Oak View, started in 1868. Construction began in 1870 for Francis Olney Winslow. F. O. Winslow was the scion of a local tanning family who expanded the family business interests on a large scale. Born in 1844, he constructed the mansion, which was finished in 1873.

F. O. Winslow died in 1926. Upon Winslow's death, Oak View passed into the hands of his daughter Clara Winslow and her husband, Frank G. Allen (married December 2, 1897) who was soon thereafter to become Governor of Massachusetts. Some of the most prominent figures hosted in Oak View during those years were President (and later a Supreme Court Justice) William Howard Taft, President Calvin Coolidge, Russian Composer Sergei Rachmaninoff, artist John Singer Sargent, Episcopal Bishop of Boston Phillips Brooks and philosopher William James, Oliver Wendell Holmes, Viscount Kentaro Kaneko of Japan, tenor John McCormack and others of similar stature.

In 1954, the Allens sold Oak View to the Missionary Servants of the Most Blessed Trinity. In 1978 it was sold to Barbara Rand and Robert Pegurri who own it still Oak View has been the site of Oak View Museum of Dollhouses since 1989.

== OakView Preservation Incorporated (OVPI) ==
OakView Preservation Incorporated formed as a non-profit corporation, organized in the Commonwealth of Massachusetts to raise funds to purchase and preserve the home called “Oak View” located in Norwood, Massachusetts. Oak View was used as a Governor's Mansion in 1929 and home to industrialist George Winslow from its beginning in 1872. OVPI will protect the building as a home and museum. As a museum, operated by OakView Preservation Incorporated, OakView will promote discovery, learning, education and an appreciation for the period of antiquity and our natural, cultural and artistic heritage. After purchase and preservation, OVPI's core activities will be collecting, curating, exhibition and education.

== Collection ==
Collection shall focus on materials, objects and information that foster improved cultural understanding and appreciation of the character that is our heritage. This will include historical objects and information on the Town of Norwood, the Commonwealth of Massachusetts, Industrialists of antiquity, builders of the home and Victoriana.

== Curator ==
Curatorial efforts will continue to upgrade collections to ensure that they are preserved and that collections and associated information are made accessible to the general public through the efforts of OakView Preservation Incorporated also known as OVPI.

== Exhibition ==
Exhibition of collections will focus on themes that integrate information and concepts from across disciplines, and that foster a better understanding and appreciation for the diverse cultural heritage that defines us all.

== Tax Status ==
OakView Preservation Incorporated is a corporation, not-for-profit. On December 18, 2007, OakView Preservation Incorporated received the determination letter form the IRS granting the 501(c)(3) status. OakView Preservation Incorporated became one step closer to the purchase Oak View, preservation of Oak View and sharing Oak View with the general public through self and guided tours and as a museum.

Successful operation of the museum will be accomplished by year three after organization and based on the support from friends, members and contributors. By actively soliciting donations and keeping costs to less than 15% of each dollar contributed, OVPI will be and remain debt free and thus a strong, preservation entity and corporation.

== Objectives ==
OakView Preservation Incorporated (OVPI) objectives include:

- To care about the past and honor the achievements of previous generations and the places they lived, specifically Oak View in Norwood, Massachusetts.
- Preserve Oak View for the future by protecting our past, and remember how we came to be, where we are, and what we ought to do. This objective gives rise to OakView Preservation Incorporated's motto of “Past, Present, Future”.
- To care about giving future generations the same opportunities to enjoy this and other beautiful buildings and landscapes that we have today.
- To educate the public on the important role that Oak View played in our history. This will be accomplished through a public museum on-premises, and other educational and cultural events sponsored by and executed by OakView Preservation Incorporated.
- To always keep the future in mind through continued renovations, restorations, providing education for the volunteer-staff for the museum, and treating the house as a living museum for the ages in perpetuity.
- To promote discovery, learning, and an appreciation for the period of antiquity and our natural, cultural and artistic heritage. After acquisition through raising funds, OVPI's core activities as a result of fundraising will be collecting, curetting, exhibition and education.

OakView Preservation Incorporated exists to conserve and preserve the environment surrounding Oak View, the home and the building for current and future generations; to ensure that the area around the house is never allowed to be encroached upon; to treat all the land as if it were a Park; to encourage all of The Public to use and enjoy Oak View in perpetuity; to provide resources for collection, curation, exhibition and education; to raise public awareness about historic preservation and cultural heritage common to all.

Preservation cares about the past. Preservation cares about honoring the achievements of previous generations, the places they lived and worked and the history and achievements we now enjoy. Preservation also cares about the present and the future. By protecting our past, it helps us remember how we came to be, where we are, and where we are going. Preservation cares about giving future generations the same opportunities to enjoy beautiful places like Oak View and landscapes and buildings that we have today. This is what OakView Preservation Incorporated (OVPI) exists to accomplish through fund raising and continually strengthening the corporation to ensure the corporation exists in perpetuity alongside Oak View.
