= Rockwood Road Historic District =

Historic district in Massachusetts, United States

- U.S. National Register of Historic Places
- U.S. Historic district
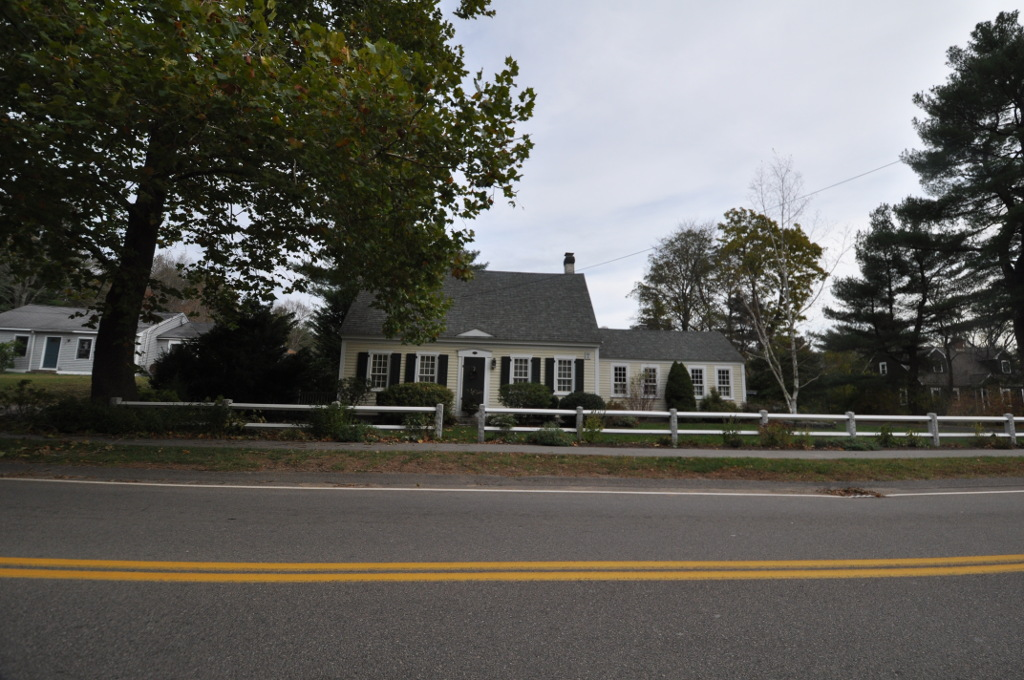

- Location within Massachusetts Location within the United States
- Location: Roughly Rockwood Rd. from MBTA tracks to Boardman St., Norfolk, Massachusetts
- Coordinates: 42°7′20″N 71°19′37″W
- Area: 16 acres (6.5 ha)
- NRHP reference No.: 100000850
- Added to NRHP: April 10, 2017

The Rockwood Road Historic District encompasses a portion of the town center of Norfolk, Massachusetts that has retained significant 19th-century characteristics. It extends along Rockwood Road (Massachusetts Route 115) from the MBTA Commuter Rail line to Boardman Street. This area consists mainly of residential or former residential buildings, as well as the 1863 Norfolk Grange Hall, a former church, and is reflective of the center's growth as a railroad village. The district was added to the National Register of Historic Places in 2017.

== Description and history ==
The area that is now the town center of Norfolk was originally part of Dedham and then Wrentham before incorporating as a separate community in 1877. The center area developed as the center of North Parish of Wrentham, with the crossroads of Rockwood Road and Main Street (outside the historic district to the south) the site of the parish meetinghouse. Rockwood Road was apparently built through the lands of the locally prominent Ware family. The village gained in prominence with the completion of the railroad line in 1850, with commercial development taking place mostly south of the tracks, and farmland on the northside subdivided more for residential development.

The historic district extends along Rockwood Road from Boardman Street southeasterly, ending just before the railroad tracks. Although the latter were important to the community's growth, and there is still a commuter rail stop there, it no longer has a historic station house. Most of the buildings in the district are residences built between about 1850 and 1900, although there are examples of older and newer buildings. The oldest buildings in the district are probably Mann House at 16 Rockwood Road (c. 1806), and the Darius Ware House at 29 Rockwood Road, which dates to about 1814. The only originally non-residential building in the district is the Norfolk Grange Hall, which was built as a Baptist church in 1863, and was the first church to be built away from the historic Town Hill area.

== See also ==
- National Register of Historic Places listings in Norfolk County, Massachusetts
