= Norfolk Grange Hall =

- U.S. National Register of Historic Places
- U.S. Historic district – Contributing property
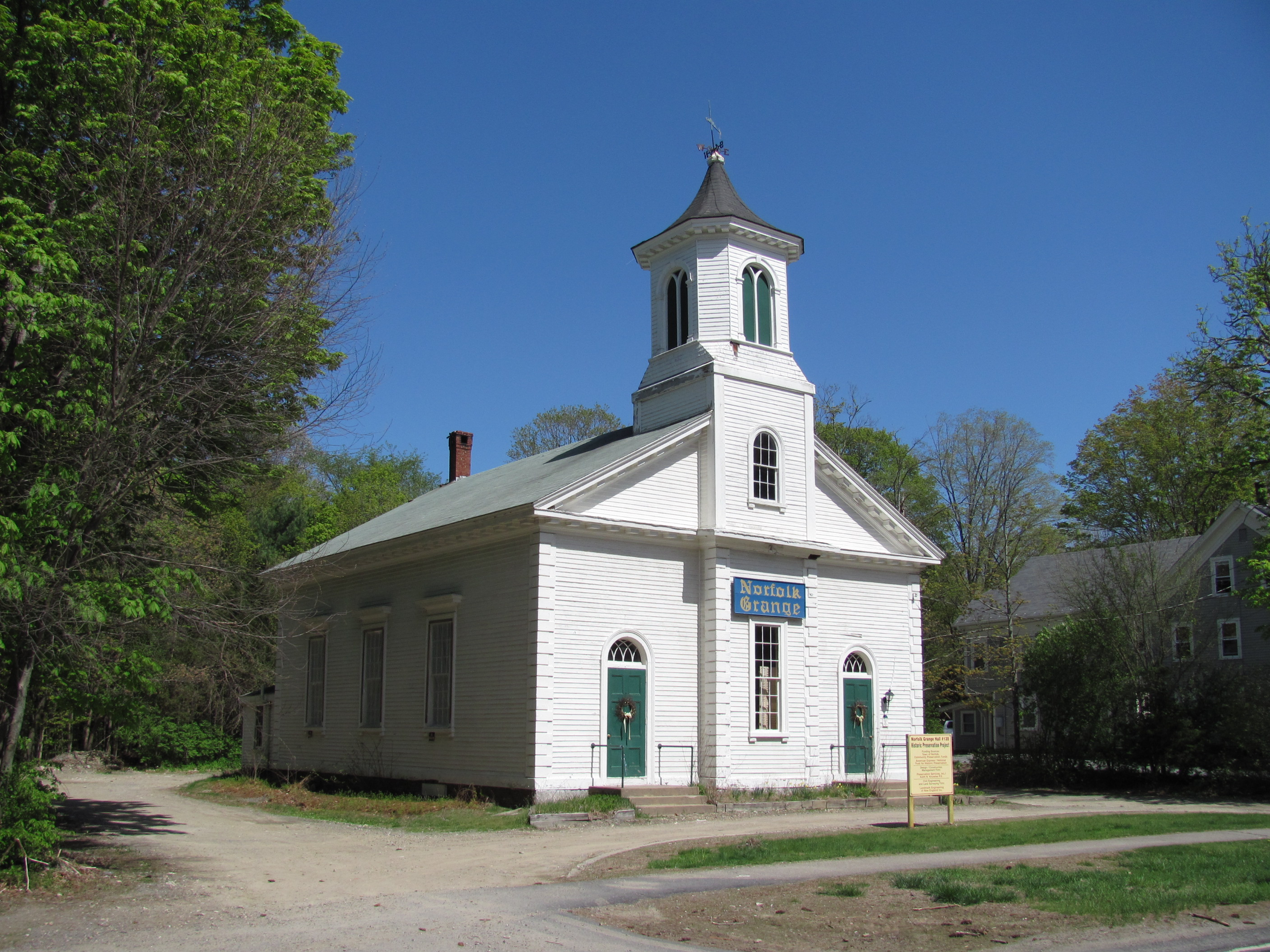
- Norfolk Grange Hall

- Location within Massachusetts Location within the United States
- Location: 28 Rockwood Rd., Norfolk, Massachusetts
- Coordinates: 42°7′20″N 71°19′58″W
- Area: 0.5 acres (0.20 ha)
- Built: 1863
- Architectural style: Italianate, Georgian
- Part of: Rockwood Road Historic District (ID100000850)
- NRHP reference No.: 89000438

Significant dates
- Added to NRHP: May 25, 1989
- Designated CP: April 10, 2017

The Norfolk Grange Hall, previously known as First Baptist Church, is a historic Grange hall and former Baptist church at 28 Rockwood Road in Norfolk, Massachusetts. Built in 1863, it is one of the town's few surviving 19th-century civic buildings. Since 1921 it has been owned by the Norfolk Grange # 135 and used as its meeting hall. It was listed on the National Register of Historic Places in 1989.

== Description and history ==
The Norfolk Grange Hall is set on the east side of Rockwood Road (Massachusetts Route 115), a short way north of Norfolk's village center. It is a single-story wood-frame structure, with a front-facing gable roof, clapboard siding, and a granite foundation. The center section of the front (west-facing) facade projects slightly, and supports a two-stage tower topped by a flared roof. The building's corners are quoined, and the front gable is fully pedimented, with modillions at the rake and eave edges. Entrances are found to either side of the center projecting section, topped by half-round transom windows.

The Baptists of Norfolk were organized about 1800, when the area was known as North Wrentham (it was incorporated as Norfolk in 1870). They first met at a parish in Medfield, and then in the old congregational meeting house when that was vacated by its congregation in 1842. In 1861, with that building requiring extensive repairs, the congregation opted to build a new edifice, resulting in the construction of this building the following year. It served that congregation, with minimal alteration, until 1921, when its declining enrollment prompted the sale of the building to the local Grange chapter.

The Grange chapter, organized in 1886, and took a significant place in the then-agricultural community that it has maintained to this day. It updated the building, adding electricity and plumbing, and has over the years opened it to all manner of civic and social functions. From 1922, when the town hall burned down, until 1949, town meetings and other town business was conducted here. The public library was housed in space at its rear from 1922 to 1956. Of the town's 19th-century public buildings, only the Federated Church is older (built in 1832).

== See also ==
- National Register of Historic Places listings in Norfolk County, Massachusetts
