= Massachusetts Route 115 =

State highway in southeastern Massachusetts, US

Route 115
- Route 115 highlighted in red

Route information
- Maintained by MassDOT
- Length: 10.87 mi (17.49 km)

Major junctions
- South end: Route 140 / US 1 in Foxborough
- North end: Route 27 in Sherborn

Location
- Country: United States
- State: Massachusetts
- Counties: Norfolk, Middlesex

Highway system
- Massachusetts State Highway System; Interstate; US; State
← Route 114A	→ Route 116

Route 115 is a 10.87-mile-long (17.49 km) south–north highway in southeastern Massachusetts. The route connects several small towns in western Norfolk County, ending just into Middlesex County in Sherborn.

== Route description ==
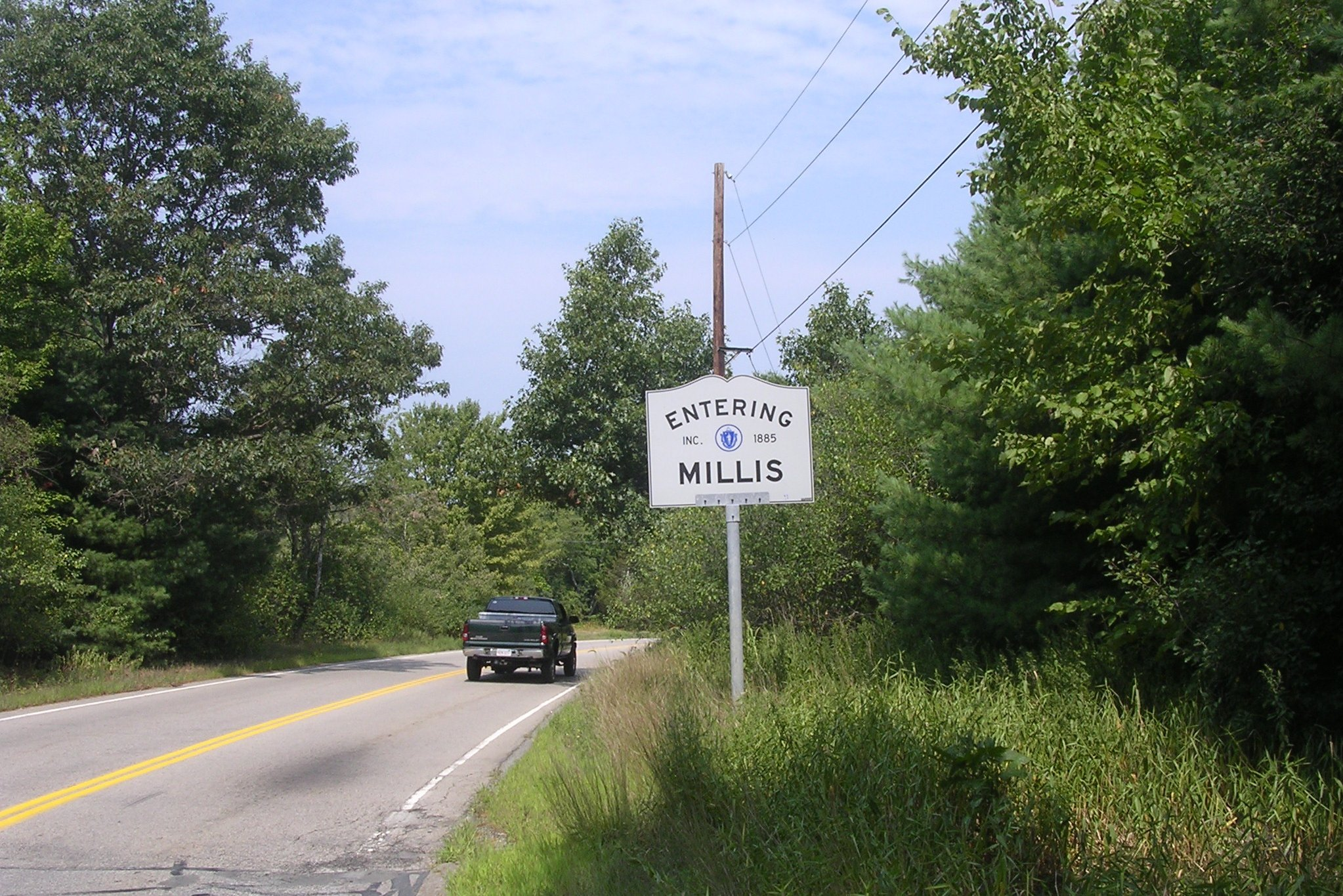
Route 115 northbound entering Millis

Route 115 begins at Route 140 in Foxborough, just north of where that pine street go route crosses U.S. Route 1. Almost immediately, the route crosses the far northeastern corner of Wrentham before passing into the town of Norfolk. In Norfolk the route crosses Route 1A before continuing northwestward, passing Stony Brook Pond and the Bristol Blake State Reservation before crossing through the center of town near the Norfolk commuter rail station. From there, Route 115 continues northward into Millis, crossing the Charles River and intersecting Route 109 at the center of town. It then continues northward, crossing into Sherborn. Once in Sherborn, the route shortly ends at Route 27, just west of that route's crossing of the Charles River into the town of Medfield.

Route 115 is in large part a scenic highway, mostly meandering through rather dense woods, with the exception being the town center of Millis, which is home to many shops and banks. Route 115 also passes through the center of Norfolk, a much smaller and less developed town than Millis.

== History ==
The current alignment of Route 115 is the route's second. Between 1927 and 1932, Route 115 was the designation of what is modern Route 9 between Kenmore Square in Boston and Route 122 in North Grafton.

== Major intersections ==
County	Location	mi	km	Destinations	Notes
Norfolk	Foxborough	0.00	0.00	Route 140 to US 1 – Wrentham, Foxborough, Mansfield	Southern terminus
Norfolk	Norfolk	1.10	1.77	Route 1A – Walpole, Norwood, Wrentham, North Attleboro	
Norfolk	Millis	7.50	12.07	Route 109 – Medway, Milford, Medfield, Dedham	
Middlesex	Sherborn	10.87	17.49	Route 27 – Sherborn, Natick, Medfield, Walpole	Northern terminus
1.000 mi = 1.609 km; 1.000 km = 0.621 mi
