= Peak House =

Peak House may refer to:

England

- Peak House, Sidmouth

United States

- Peak House (Bedford, Kentucky), listed on the National Register of Historic Places (NRHP) in Trimble County
- Peak House (Medfield, Massachusetts), NRHP-listed
