= Norfolk station (MBTA) =

Rail station in Norfolk, Massachusetts, US

Norfolk
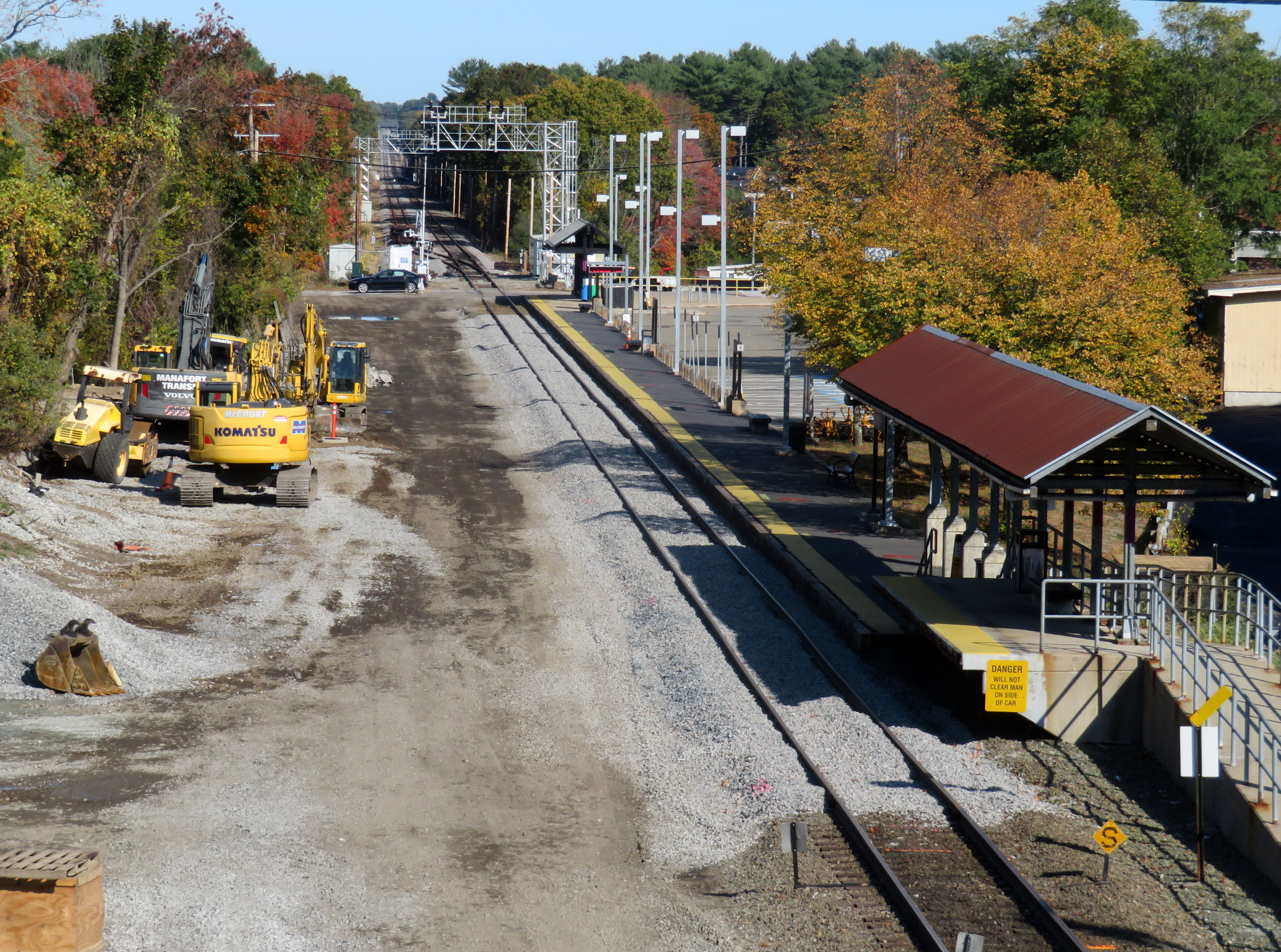
- Norfolk station in October 2020

General information
- Location: 9 Rockwood Road; Norfolk, Massachusetts
- Coordinates: 42.12002°N 71.32664°W
- Lines: Franklin Branch; Medway Branch (former)
- Platforms: 1 side platform
- Tracks: 1
- Connections: GATRA: Medway T Shuttle

Construction
- Parking: 630 spaces ($4.00 fee)
- Cycle facilities: 8 spaces
- Accessible: Yes

Other information
- Fare zone: 5

History
- Opened: c. 1849
- Rebuilt: 1990
- Former names: North Wrentham

Passengers
- 2024: 430 daily boardings

Services
Preceding station	MBTA	Following station
Franklin toward Forge Park/495	Franklin/Foxboro Line	Walpole toward South Station
Former services
Preceding station	New York, New Haven and Hartford Railroad	Following station
Franklin toward Blackstone	Midland Line	Walpole toward Boston
Location

Norfolk station is an MBTA Commuter Rail station in Norfolk, Massachusetts, served by the Franklin/Foxboro Line. The station has one platform which serves a single track, with a mini-high section for accessibility. The Norfolk County Railroad opened through the North Wrentham village of Wrentham in 1849. A branch line to Medway was open from 1852 to 1864. The station was renamed Norfolk along with the town in 1870. Several different railroads operated the line, with the New York, New Haven and Hartford Railroad running it for much of the 20th century. Massachusetts Bay Transportation Authority (MBTA) subsidies began in 1966, and the agency bought the line in 1973. The mini-high platform was added in 1990.

== Station layout ==
Norfolk station is located in the small commercial center of Norfolk, adjacent to the Rockwood Road grade crossing. The single track of the Franklin Branch runs approximately northeast–southwest through the station area. The station has a single low-level platform on the south side of the track, with an accessible mini-high platform at its southwest end. Three MBTA-owned parking lots around the station have a total of 630 parking spaces. The Greater Attleboro Taunton Regional Transit Authority operates a shuttle connecting the station with downtown Medway.

== History ==
=== Opening ===
The Norfolk County Railroad opened through the North Wrentham village of Wrentham on May 16, 1849. North Wrentham station, located at Rockwood Road in North Wrentham, was among those opened within the next year. The Medway Branch Railroad, leased by the Norfolk County Railroad as its Medway Branch, opened from North Wrentham to Medway on December 29, 1852. The Norfolk County Railroad, Midland Railroad, and Southbridge and Blackstone Railroad were consolidated in 1853 to form the Boston and New York Central Railroad (B&NYC).

The financial failure of the B&NYC in 1855 led to the trustees of the bondholders of the Norfolk County Railroad taking back control of their line. It was leased to the Boston and Providence from 1855 to 1857, and then to the East Thompson Railroad from 1857 to 1858, after which the trustees operated the railroad and the Medway Branch themselves. The New York and Boston Railroad opened to Medway in 1861, obviating the need for the Medway Branch. The branch was closed and dismantled in 1864.

=== Successors ===
The Norfolk County was leased to the Boston, Hartford and Erie Railroad (successor of the Boston and New York Central) in 1867. North Wrentham separated from Wrentham in 1870 and was incorporated as Norfolk. The station was renamed shortly after. By the mid-1870s, the station building was located on the north side of the tracks just west of Rockwood Road, with a freight house on the opposite corner.

The line passed to the New York and New England Railroad in 1875, the New England Railroad in 1895, and the New York, New Haven and Hartford Railroad in 1898. It was double-tracked through Norfolk in 1882. By 1915, a single combination depot had replaced the separate station and freight house. The second track was removed in 1941. The original station building and freight house are no longer extant.

=== MBTA era ===
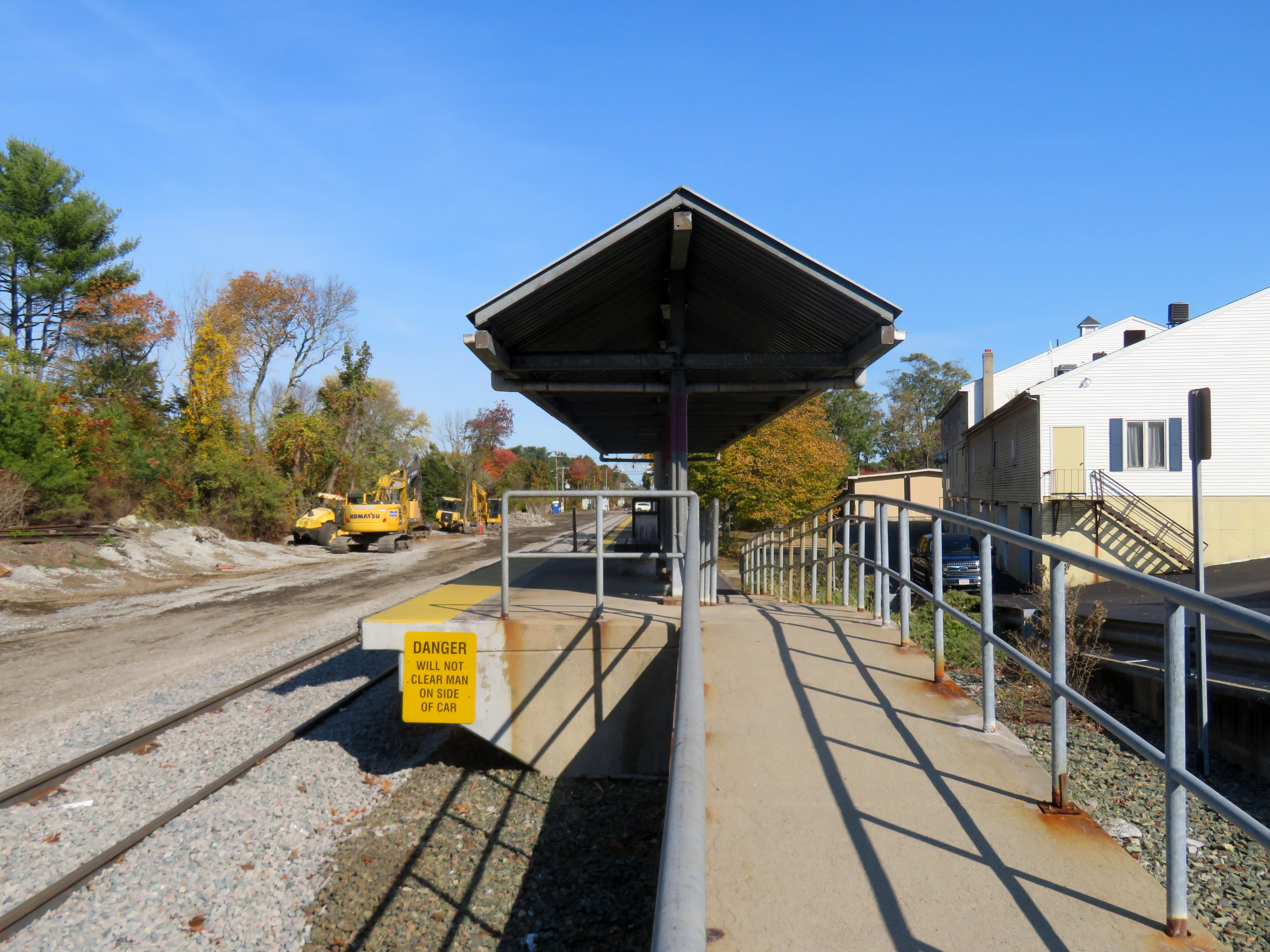
The 1990-built mini-high platform

The Massachusetts Bay Transportation Authority (MBTA) was formed in 1964 to subsidize suburban commuter rail service. The MBTA began subsidizing service on the line as far as Norfolk on April 24, 1966; service past Norfolk to Franklin station was subsidized by Franklin. The New Haven merged into Penn Central in 1969. The MBTA purchased most of the Penn Central commuter lines, including the Franklin Branch, in January 1973.

The MBTA gradually increased service on the Franklin Line; in 1977, the agency began an $11 million track and station reconstruction project on the line, partially funded by the Urban Mass Transportation Administration. Ridership on the line tripled from 1982 to 1990, with much of the increase at Norfolk.

The mini-high platform was added along with a new parking lot in 1990. A 1994 study found that the station served surrounding towns including Franklin, Medfield, Medway, Millis, and Wrentham, with only 30% of ridership from Norfolk itself. In 2019–2020, the MBTA added double track from just east of Norfolk station to just west of Walpole station. Work on a second phase, which will add double track through Norfolk station and west to near Franklin, began in 2020. As of November 2024, construction work for that phase is expected to be completed in January 2026.
