= Medfield Social Library =

- Location: Medfield, Massachusetts, United States
- Established: 1786
- Dissolved: A remnant reportedly stored at the town farm (1880s)

Collection
- Size: Approximately 700 volumes (as of 1816)

The Medfield Social Library (est.1786) was a proprietary library in Medfield, Massachusetts. It incorporated in 1809. By 1816 it consisted of some 700 volumes, among them The Panoplist, Mary Pilkington's Mirror for Females, Susanna Rowson's Invisible Rambler, Claude-Étienne Savary's Letters on Egypt, Scott's Lessons in Reading, and George Staunton's Embassy to China. Librarians included "Dr. Prentiss." As of the 1880s "a remnant" of the library was reportedly "stored at the town farm."
