= Dwight–Derby House =

Historic house in Massachusetts, United States

- U.S. National Register of Historic Places
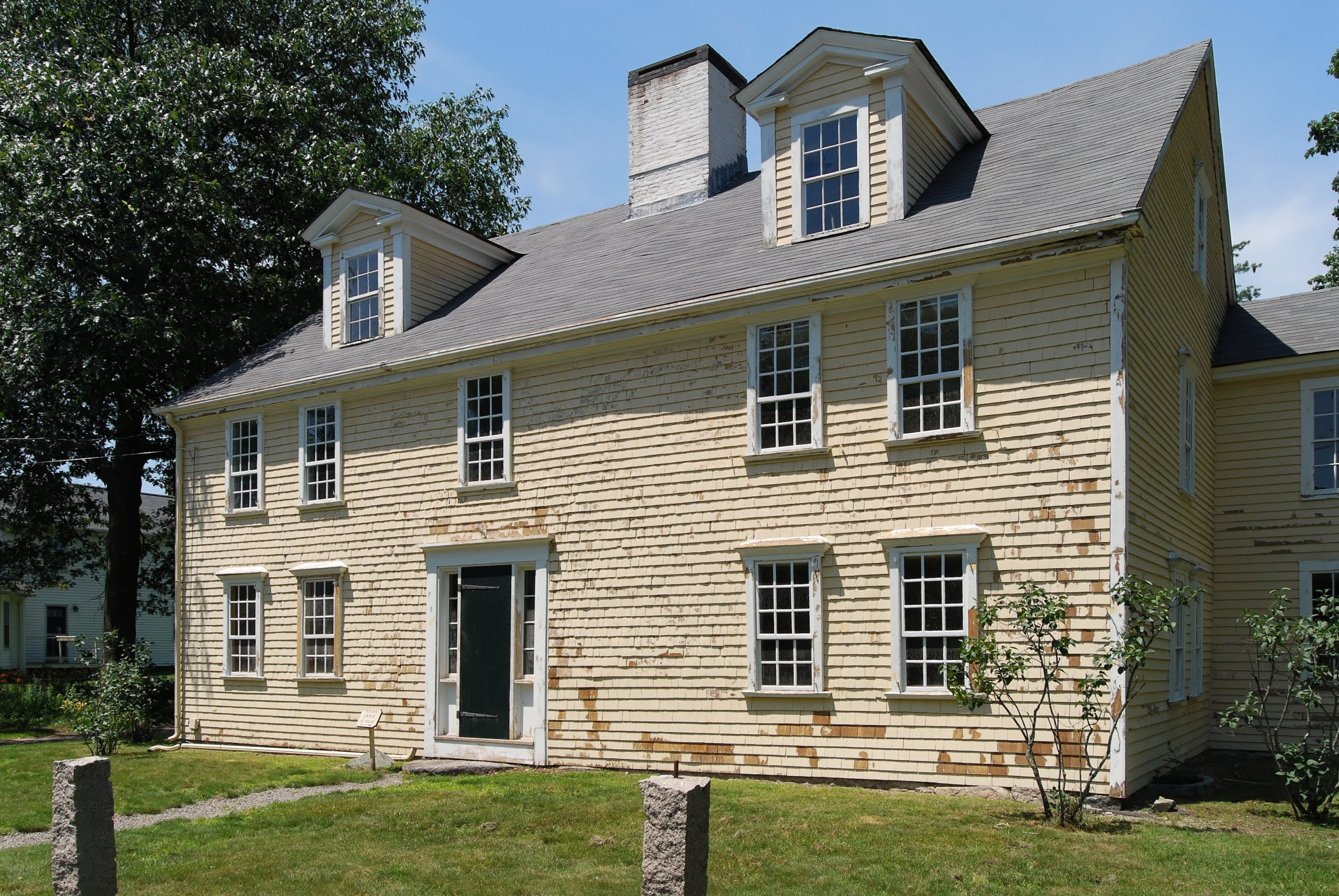

- Location within Massachusetts Location within the United States
- Interactive map showing the location of Dwight-Derby House
- Location: 7 Frairy St., Medfield, Massachusetts
- Coordinates: 42°11′16″N 71°18′30″W
- Built: 1697
- Architectural style: Georgian, First period
- NRHP reference No.: 01001465
- Added to NRHP: January 17, 2002

The Dwight–Derby House is at 7 Frairy Street in Medfield, Massachusetts. The Oxford Dendrochronology Laboratory took samples of the house frame in 2007 and determined that the earliest, southwest portion of the house was built in 1697, and an addition was built to the east in 1713. The town bought the house in 1996, and it was listed on the National Register of Historic Places in 2002.

== History ==
John Dwight, son of Timothy (Note: Timothy was the brother of John Dwight) and Mary Dwight, married in 1696 and built the earliest section of the house in 1697. The second family who owned and occupied the house, for another four generations, was the Derby family, starting with John Derby, grandson of Elias Hasket Derby, of Salem, Massachusetts, America's first millionaire.

== Today ==
Today, the Dwight–Derby House sits on a half acre lot in its original location overlooking Meeting House Pond.

Shortly after the Dwight–Derby House was bought by the town of Medfield in 1996, the Friends of the Dwight–Derby House, Inc. was formed to restore, manage and share its historical significance with the community. Thanks to generous donations, grants from the Massachusetts Historical Commission and the National Trust, the house has been able to endure structural and exterior repairs.

== See also ==
- List of the oldest buildings in Massachusetts
- National Register of Historic Places listings in Norfolk County, Massachusetts
