= Montrose School =

Coordinates: 42°11′14.76″N 71°18′22.61″W

- Medfield, MA; United States

Information
- Type: Independent girls' day school
- Motto: Where girls are called to greatness (Formerly: Educating women of faith, character, and vision)
- Opened: 1979; 47 years ago
- Principal: Mrs. Katie Elrod
- Grades: 6–12
- Colors: Red and white
- Team name: Montrose Mavericks
- Newspaper: The Looking Glass
- Website: montroseschool.org

Montrose School is a Catholic independent school for girls in grades 6–12 located in Medfield, Massachusetts, USA.

== History ==
Montrose was founded in 1979 in Brookline, Massachusetts, by a group of parents and educators with a vision of girls’ education inspired by the teachings of the Roman Catholic Church and St. Josemaria Escriva. The founders asked the Prelature of Opus Dei to provide chaplains to oversee religious teachings, celebrate mass, hear confessions and lead reflections. One of the school's founders was marketing consultant Bill Bowman, later co-founder of the educational software company Spinnaker Software in 1982.

After its initial period in Brookline, the school spent a few years each in the towns of Westwood and Natick. In 2007, Montrose moved to its permanent location in Medfield.

== Curriculum ==
Montrose offers a classical liberal arts curriculum, as well as character education integrated throughout the seven-year curriculum. Students participate in a mentoring program, daily enrichment opportunities for mass or non-academic individual reading, a guest speaker series, class and school service projects and the development of habits of heart, mind and character.

The upper school curriculum includes four years of English, mathematics, history, science and theology or philosophy, as well as at least three years of foreign language and fine arts. Languages offered include Spanish, French and Latin. During their senior year, students complete and present final capstone projects focusing on social issues or other interdisciplinary questions.

The middle school curriculum has two English classes in grade 6 and 7 and a full year of geography. In 7th grade, the students study ancient civilizations. In 8th grade, the students are introduced to the language program by taking a full year of Latin; they also take civics.

Montrose also offers study abroad trips for students: the "In the Footsteps of Dante" trip to Italy for upper school students. The school has recently introduced an exchange student program for 10 days with one of its sister schools, Rosemont in Ireland.

== Extracurricular ==
=== Sports ===
Montrose offers nine varsity sports, plus club sports and other athletic offerings. During fall, soccer, field hockey, volleyball and cross country are offered. Basketball, ski club and indoor track are offered during the winter season, and lacrosse, softball, and track and field during the spring. Students are encouraged to start a club if they would like to see another sport on the Montrose campus.

=== Music and drama program ===
The Montrose Players put on three major productions each year: a middle school musical, an upper school play and an all-school musical. There are also two major music productions annually. These concerts include pieces from The Upper School and Middle School Chorus, Tone Chimes, Instrumental Ensemble and the school's a cappella groups. Montrose School has two a cappella groups, the Treblemakers (upper school) and the Clef Hangers (middle school).
