= Medway Public Schools =

School district in Massachusetts, US

Address
- 45 Holliston Street Medway, Massachusetts, 02053; United States

District information
- Motto: "Excellence for all through learning"
- Grades: Pre-school - 12
- Superintendent: Armond Pires
- Enrollment: 2,756

Other information
- Telephone: (508) 533-3222
- Fax: (508) 533-3226
- Website: www.medwayschools.org

Medway Public Schools is a public school district in Norfolk County, Massachusetts, United States, based in Medway, Massachusetts.

== Schools ==
Medway Public Schools has two elementary schools, one middle school, and one high school.

=== Elementary schools ===
- Burke-Memorial School
- McGovern School

=== Middle school ===
- Medway Middle School

=== High school ===
- Medway High School
