= Medway, Massachusetts =

- Town
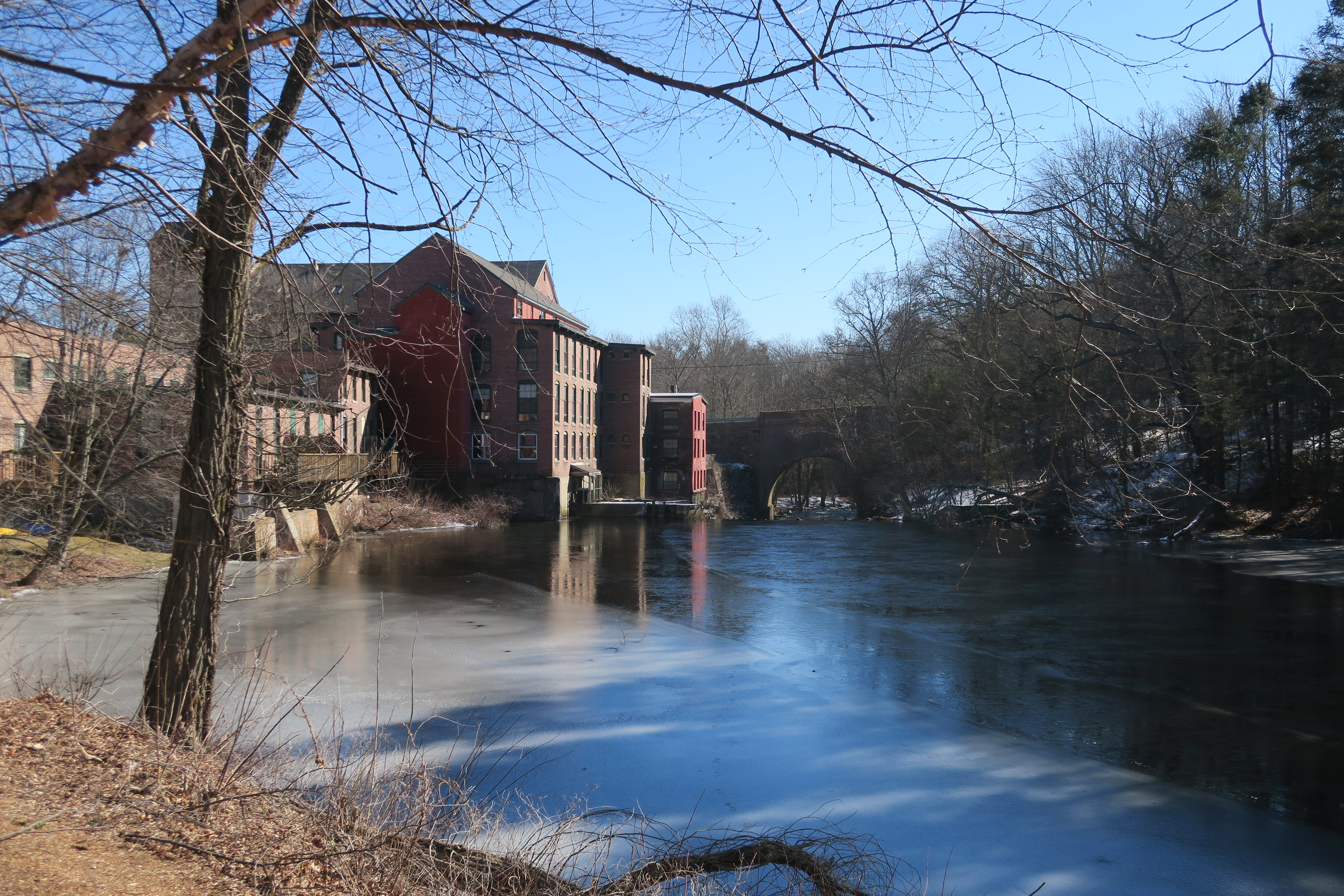
- Sanford Mills on the Charles River

- Seal

- Location in Norfolk County in Massachusetts
- Coordinates: 42°08′30″N 71°23′50″W
- Country: United States
- State: Massachusetts
- County: Norfolk
- Settled: 1657
- Incorporated: 1713
- Founder: Henry Garnsey
- Medway 300: January 1, 2013

Government
  - Type: Open town meeting
  - Town Manager: Michael Boynton

Area
  - Total: 11.5 sq mi (29.9 km^{2})
  - Land: 11.5 sq mi (29.7 km^{2})
  - Water: 0.077 sq mi (0.2 km^{2})
- Elevation: 200 ft (61 m)

Population (2024)
  - Total: 13,836
  - Density: 1,144/sq mi (441.6/km^{2})
- Demonym: Medwanian
- Time zone: UTC−5 (Eastern)
  - Summer (DST): UTC−4 (Eastern)
- ZIP Code: 02053
- Area code: 508/774
- FIPS code: 25-39975
- GNIS feature ID: 0619458
- Website: medwayma.gov

Medway is a town in Norfolk County, Massachusetts, United States. The town had a population of 13,115 at the 2020 census.

== History ==
Medway was first settled in 1657 and was officially incorporated in 1713. At that time, Medway began as a farming community of two hundred thirty-three. It was not long before the water power of the Charles River and Chicken Brook stimulated the formation of cotton and paper mills, straw and boot factories, and a variety of cottage industries. Medway demonstrates the central importance of the Charles River and the thriving town that grew alongside it. Today, the one-room schoolhouses are gone and the country stores have moved to the mall, but the open town meetings continue.

After nearby Medfield was established as a town in 1651, an increasing number of newcomers settled on the land west of the Charles River. By 1712, this settlement west of the Charles had grown large enough to petition the Massachusetts General Court for the creation of a separate new town. That petition was granted, and the town of Medway incorporated on October 25, 1713. At its founding by Henry Garnsey, and for 170 years afterward, the town of Medway included the land that is now Millis. Eventually, the eastern section of the town, known as East Medway, separated in 1885 to form the town of Millis, and Medway assumed the shape it has today.

The main cause for the independent formation of Millis from Medway was the physical separation caused by a massive tract of undevelopable land appropriately named in those times, the Great Black Swamp. The Black Swamp was at the geographical center point of Medway and East Medway. Had the land been developable, this would have been the ideal location for a central meeting house, as well as churches and schools. However, because the thick forest/swamp was completely undevelopable, this forced inhabitants of Medway and East Medway to form separate communities with their own respective necessities such as a meeting house and churches. Despite this natural separation, the town remained as one for over 170 years.

The oldest road in Medway was laid out in 1670 and was known for years as Old Mendon Road. Since that time, this road has been known by many names including The Road to the Wilderness, The Old County Road, The Middle Post Road, and most recently, Village Street. Village Street runs from the Millis border on the east and meanders along the Charles River before eventually joining Main Street just before the Bellingham border on the west. The heart of the old town of Medway is found along this road, with the central location of activity at Medway Village, where Holliston Street intersects with Village Street.

In 1869, all of the streets in Medway were officially named. Many streets ended up losing their original names, and were instead named after influential townspeople of the past and present. Some examples of this were; Pine Hill Road became Winthrop Street, Vine Lane became Kelley Street, Candlewood Island Road was named Oakland Street, and The Old Hartford Turnpike was named Main Street. A few other examples of roads in Medway named after past residents include Lovering Street, Adams Street, Partridge Street, Ellis Street, Clark Street, Coffee Street, and Barber Street.

== Geography ==
According to the United States Census Bureau, the town has a total area of 11.5 square miles (30 km^{2}), of which 11.4 square miles (30 km^{2}) is land and 0.1 square miles (0.26 km^{2}) (0.78%) is water. Medway is the geographical center between Boston, Worcester, and Providence, which is purported by some to explain the origin of the name. However, like many New England cities and towns, it most likely derived its name from an English location, in this case, the region of Medway, England, or the River Medway. Likely both its geographical location and a nod to old England compelled the choice of town name.

== Demographics ==
Historical population
Year	Pop.	±%
1790	1,035	—
1850	2,778	+168.4%
1860	3,195	+15.0%
1870	3,721	+16.5%
1880	3,956	+6.3%
1890	2,985	−24.5%
1900	2,761	−7.5%
1910	2,696	−2.4%
1920	2,956	+9.6%
1930	3,153	+6.7%
1940	3,297	+4.6%
1950	3,744	+13.6%
1960	5,168	+38.0%
1970	7,938	+53.6%
1980	8,447	+6.4%
1990	9,931	+17.6%
2000	12,448	+25.3%
2010	12,752	+2.4%
2020	13,115	+2.8%
2023*	13,560	+3.4%
* = population estimate. Source: United States census records and Population Estimates Program data.

As of the census of 2024, there were 13,836 people and 4,573 households residing in the town. The population density was 1,136.8 inhabitants per square mile (438.9/km^{2}). The racial makeup of the town was 83.9% White, 1.1% African American, 5.3% Asian, and 8.4% from two or more races. Hispanic or Latino of any race were 4.2% of the population.

There were 4,182 households, out of which 97.7% had children under the age of 18 living with them, 69% were married couples living together, 7.5% had a female householder with no husband present, and 20.2% were non-families. 17.2% of all households were made up of individuals, and 7.1% had someone living alone who was 65 years of age or older. The average household size was 2.95 and the average family size was 3.36.

In the town, the population was spread out, with 31.9% under the age of 18, 4.3% from 18 to 24, 33.4% from 25 to 44, 21.4% from 45 to 64, and 9.1% who were 65 years of age or older. The median age was 36 years. For every 100 females, there were 94.0 males. For every 100 females age 18 and over, there were 90.3 males.

The median income for a household in the town was $150,673 and the median income for a family was $172,302. Males had a median income of $121,245 versus $86,149 for females. The per capita income for the town was $51,008. About 1.8% of families and 5.2% of the population were below the poverty line, including 1.6% of those under age 18 and 4.6% of those age 65 or over.

== Sports ==
=== Football ===
In 2006, the New England Intensity of the Independent Women's Football League began playing its home games at Medway's Hanlon Field.

In 2008, the Bay State Renegades, of the New England Football League, began playing their home games at Hanlon Field. The team won four of the five games played at their new home. In 2007, the Worcester Wildcats, also of the NEFL, relocated for one season to Hanlon Field as their home in Worcester underwent significant renovations.

== Education ==
Medway Public Schools are part of the Medway Public Schools school district. Currently, there are four schools actively enrolling students in the district. The McGovern school provides preschool, kindergarten, and 1st-grade education, the Burke-Memorial school provides 2nd–4th grade education, Medway Middle School provides 5th–8th-grade education, and Medway High School. The High School is the newest of the four schools. The building was completed in 2003 and the school saw its first graduating class in 2005. As of 2004, the high school had 771 students and 52 teachers, with a teacher:student ratio of 1:15. The Middle School was completely renovated and modernized in 2012.

In 2008, approximately 217 10th grade students participated in the Massachusetts Comprehensive Assessment System exam. The passing rate was 96.3% for both the Math and English Language sections, and 87.9% for the Science section. In 2007, 193 Medway High School students took the SAT, an increase from previous years. The average composite score was 1,614; of these students, 85.8% chose to attend a four-year college education program.

== Transportation ==
Both Route 109 and Route 126 pass through the town and serve as some of the main roads in the town. Interstate 495 shortly passes through the southwest corner of the town, but does not provide any exits. The closest exits are in nearby Bellingham and Milford.

The closest MBTA Commuter Rail service is at Forge Park/495, Franklin, and Norfolk stations on the Franklin/Foxboro Line. Until 1966, the Millis Branch served stations at Medway and West Medway.

== Places of worship ==
Medway is home to four churches:

- St. Joseph's Catholic Church on Village Street
- Medway Community Church, which has Congregational and Baptist roots and is currently a member of the Conservative Congregational Christian Conference (CCCC)
- Medway Village Church on Village Street, also a member of the Conservative Congregational Christian Conference (CCCC)
- Christ Episcopal Church on School Street

== Notable people ==
- James "Grizzly" Adams (1812–1860), famous mountain man and bear trainer; born in Medway
- William Taylor Adams (1822–1897), author under the name "Oliver Optic"; born in Medway
- Pete Carmichael Jr. (born 1971), former offensive coordinator for the New Orleans Saints and currently for the Buffalo Bills.
- Dennis Crowley (born 1976), creator of the mobile application "Foursquare" and a member of Time magazine's 100 most influential people of 2010
- Alphonso Van Marsh, American journalist and war correspondent for CNN
