= Alphonso Van Marsh =

Alphonso Van Marsh is an American journalist and war correspondent. He is based outside the United States.

Marsh was one of Cable News Network’s (CNN) first “Video Correspondents” in 2003. Marsh broke the story of Saddam Hussein’s capture while on assignment in Iraq in December 2003. He used CNN's digital newsgathering technology in place of traditional newsgathering crews.

== Background and journalism career ==
Born and raised in Medway, Massachusetts.

Marsh has reported from several countries and war zones. Marsh has embedded with American, British, Canadian and Egyptian troops on various assignments.

Marsh has spent most of his journalism career in the Middle East and Africa, having been based in Cairo, Istanbul, Nairobi and Johannesburg.

As a general assignment reporter based out of CNN's London bureau, Marsh has covered topics ranging from the Royal Family to the inquest into the death of Diana, Princess of Wales.

== Awards and recognition ==
In 2004, Marsh won a National Headliner Award for his reporting of Saddam Hussein's capture.

== See also ==
- Amazing Grace (2006 film)
