= Peak House (Medfield, Massachusetts) =

Historic house in Massachusetts, United States

- Peak House Heritage Center
- U.S. National Register of Historic Places
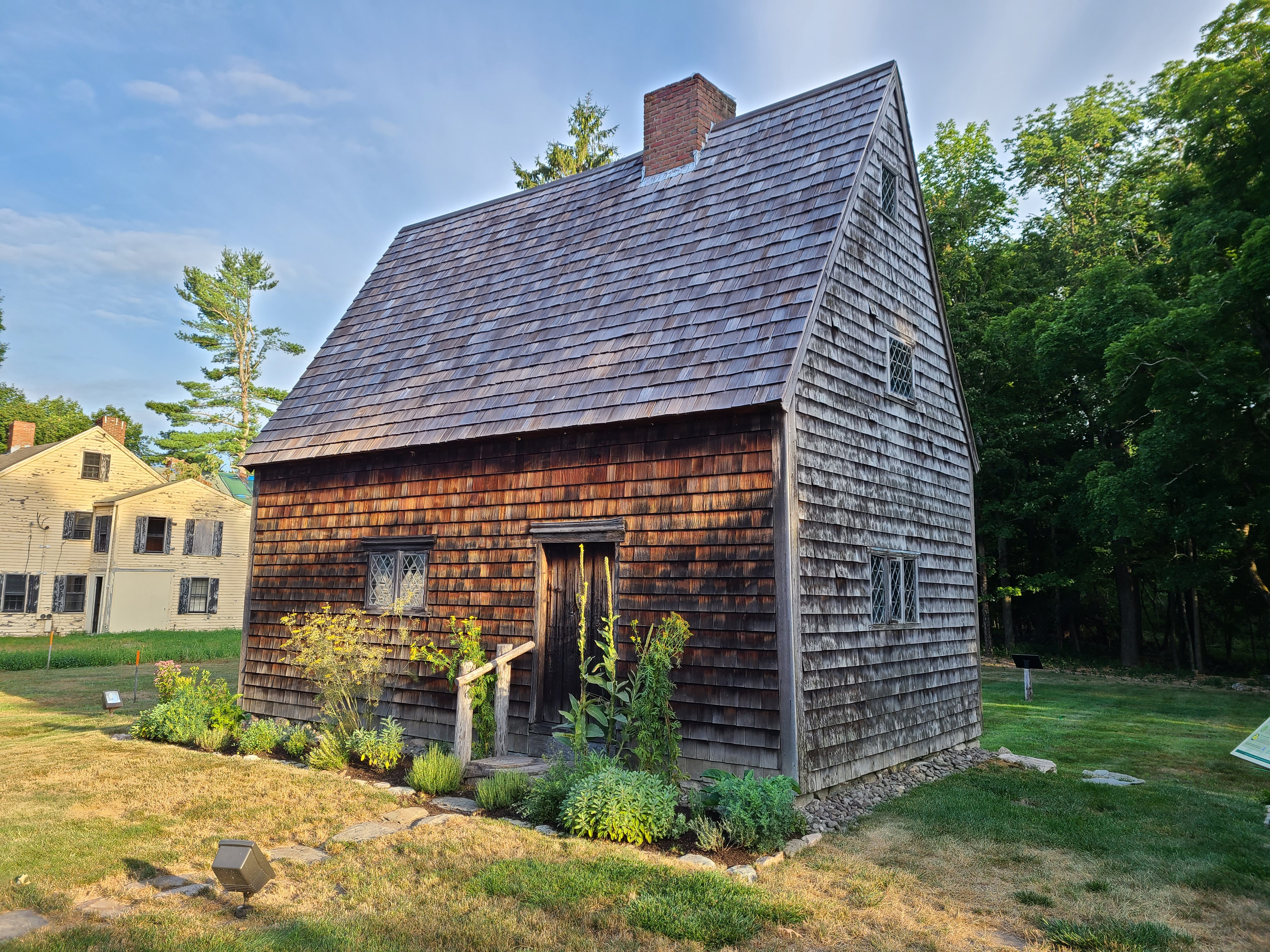
- Peak House

- Location within Massachusetts Location within the United States
- Location: 347 Main Street, Medfield, Massachusetts
- Coordinates: 42°11′23″N 71°17′50″W
- Built: c. 1711
- Architectural style: First Period
- Website: http://www.peakhouseheritagecenter.org
- NRHP reference No.: 75000288
- Added to NRHP: September 5, 1975

Peak House Heritage Center is a historic site located in Medfield, Massachusetts.

According to tradition, the original house was built in 1651 by Benjamin Clark, was burned during the King Philip's War on February 21, 1676, and was rebuilt ca. 1677–1680 by Benjamin Clark, the owner of the original house. The current Peak House, however, was built in 1711 as an ell to the rebuilt house, and was moved to its current location in 1762 when the rebuilt house began to deteriorate. It is one of the oldest houses in Medfield and one of the earliest surviving examples of post-medieval English (Elizabethan) architecture in the United States. Some of the original panes of imported English glass in the windows can still be seen today. The building was listed on the National Register of Historic Places in 1975 and has the highest pitched roof on record in Massachusetts for a colonial American house.

On October 18, 1924, the Peak House was deeded to the Medfield Historical Society by its then-owners, Mr. and Mrs. Frederick Mason Smith, after which the house received a down-to-the-frame restoration. The house has served both as a dwelling and an historical site, as well as an artist's studio and workshop.

On January 1, 2019, a ten-year Property Management Agreement was signed by the Medfield Historical Society and the Peak House Heritage Center which now has complete autonomy for facilities, operations, and programs.

== See also ==
- List of the oldest buildings in Massachusetts
- National Register of Historic Places listings in Norfolk County, Massachusetts
