= Medfield (CDP), Massachusetts =

Medfield, Massachusetts
- Census-designated place
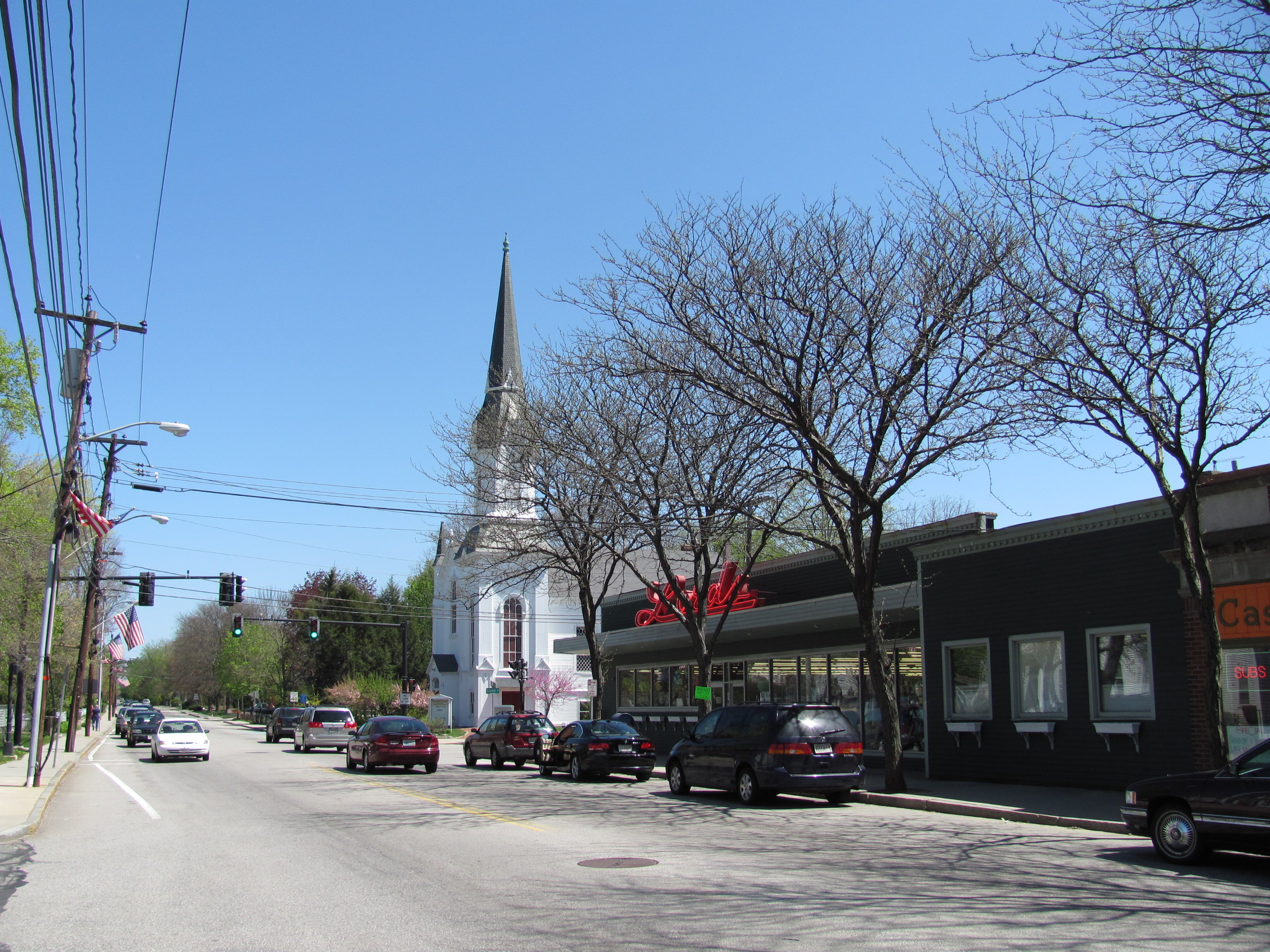
- Main Street

- Location in Norfolk County in Massachusetts
- Coordinates: 42°11′17″N 71°18′15″W
- Country: United States
- State: Massachusetts
- County: Norfolk
- Town: Medfield

Area
  - Total: 5.04 sq mi (13.05 km^{2})
  - Land: 4.95 sq mi (12.81 km^{2})
  - Water: 0.089 sq mi (0.23 km^{2})
- Elevation: 187 ft (57 m)

Population (2020)
  - Total: 6,939
  - Density: 1,402.4/sq mi (541.48/km^{2})
- Time zone: UTC-5 (Eastern (EST))
  - Summer (DST): UTC-4 (EDT)
- ZIP code: 02052
- Area code: 508
- FIPS code: 25-39730
- GNIS feature ID: 0611950

Medfield is a census-designated place (CDP) in the town of Medfield in Norfolk County, Massachusetts, United States. The population was 6,483 at the 2010 census.

== Geography ==
Medfield is located at 42°11′16″N 71°18′14″W (42.187951, -71.304164).

According to the United States Census Bureau, the CDP has a total area of 13.1 km^{2} (5.1 sq mi), of which 13.0 km^{2} (5.0 sq mi) is land and 0.1 km^{2} (0.039 sq mi) (0.79%) is water.

== Demographics ==
Historical population
Census	Pop.	Note	%±
2020	6,939		—
U.S. Decennial Census

As of the census of 2000, there were 6,670 people, 2,394 households, and 1,776 families residing in the CDP. The population density was 512.0 people/km^{2} (1,326 people/mi^{2}). There were 2,432 housing units at an average density of 186.7 units/km^{2} (484 units/mi^{2}). The racial makeup of the CDP was 96.21% White, 0.52% Black or African American, 0.07% Native American, 2.22% Asian, 0.24% from other races, and 0.73% from two or more races. Hispanic or Latino of any race were 0.85% of the population.

There were 2,394 households, out of which 43.4% had children under the age of 18 living with them, 64.2% were married couples living together, 8.1% had a female householder with no husband present, and 25.8% were non-families. 22.0% of all households were made up of individuals, and 9.3% had someone living alone who was 65 years of age or older. The average household size was 2.77 and the average family size was 3.30.

In the CDP, the population was spread out, with 30.7% under the age of 18, 4.0% from 18 to 24, 29.0% from 25 to 44, 24.1% from 45 to 64, and 12.2% who were 65 years of age or older. The median age was 38 years. For every 100 females, there were 94.1 males. For every 100 females age 18 and over, there were 88.2 males.

The median income for a household in the CDP was $83,358, and the median income for a family was $96,945. Males had a median income of $62,210 versus $46,406 for females. The per capita income for the CDP was $36,647. About 1.5% of families and 2.4% of the population were below the poverty line, including 2.3% of those under age 18 and 2.3% of those age 65 or over.
