= Franklin station (Massachusetts) =

Railway station in Franklin, Massachusetts, US

Franklin
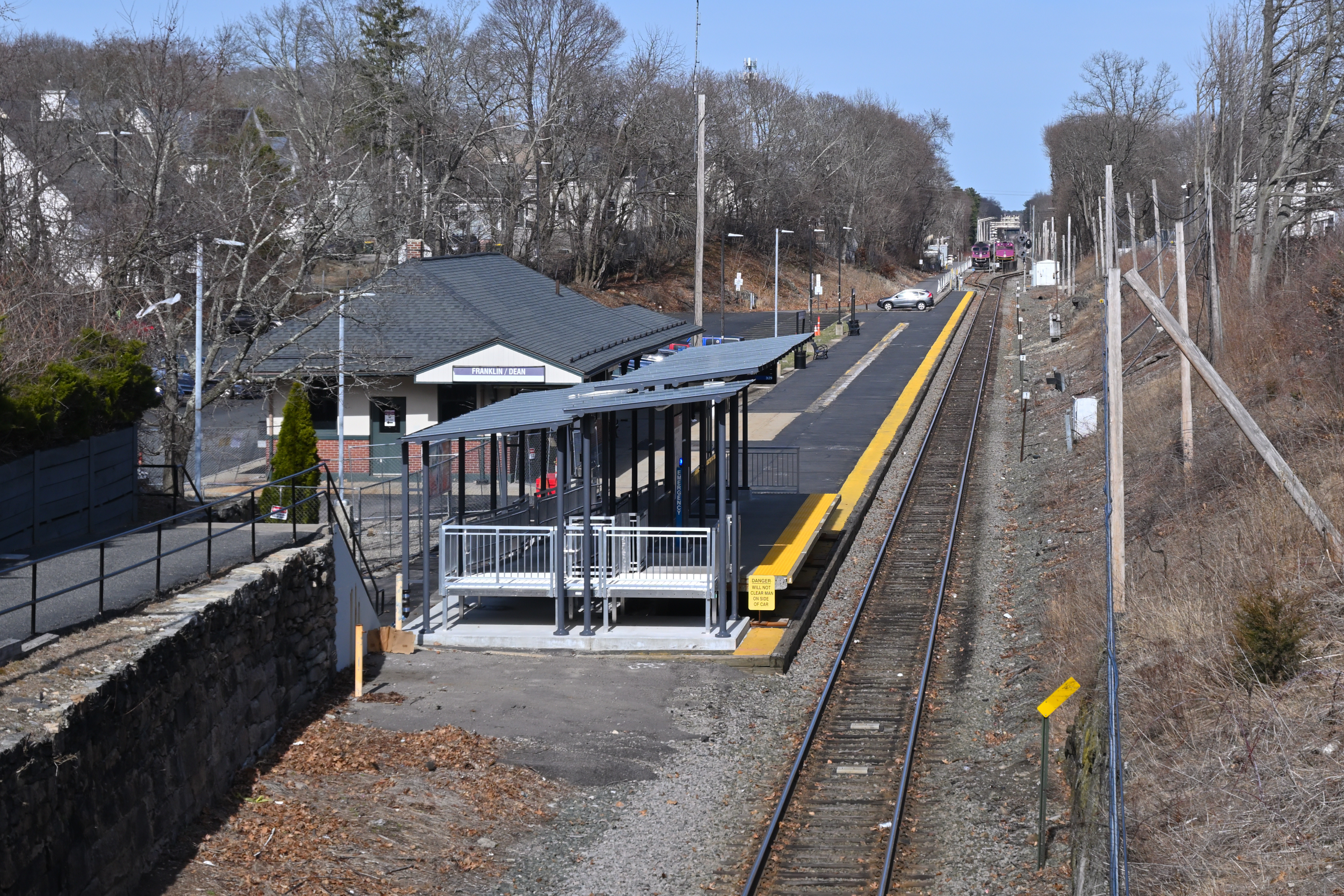
- Franklin station in March 2025

General information
- Location: 75 Depot Street; Franklin, Massachusetts
- Coordinates: 42.0833°N 71.3961°W
- Line: Franklin Branch
- Platforms: 1 side platform
- Tracks: 1

Construction
- Parking: 173 spaces ($4.00 fee)
- Cycle facilities: 7 spaces
- Accessible: Yes

Other information
- Fare zone: 6

History
- Rebuilt: 1906, 2024–2025

Passengers
- 2024: 404 daily boardings

Services
Preceding station	MBTA	Following station
Forge Park/495 Terminus	Franklin/Foxboro Line	Norfolk toward South Station
Former services
Preceding station	New York, New Haven and Hartford Railroad	Following station
Blackstone Terminus	Midland Line	Norfolk toward Boston
Location

Franklin station is an MBTA Commuter Rail station located in Franklin, Massachusetts, near Dean College. It serves the Franklin/Foxboro Line, for which it was the terminus from 1966 to 1988. The station has a mid-sized park and ride lot to serve town residents; Forge Park/495 station is intended to serve commuters from other nearby towns. The 1912-built station building still serves as a waiting hall and café, open during morning commute hours on weekdays. Franklin/Dean College station has a single side platform serving the line's single track with a mini-high platform for accessibility.

== History ==
=== Early history ===
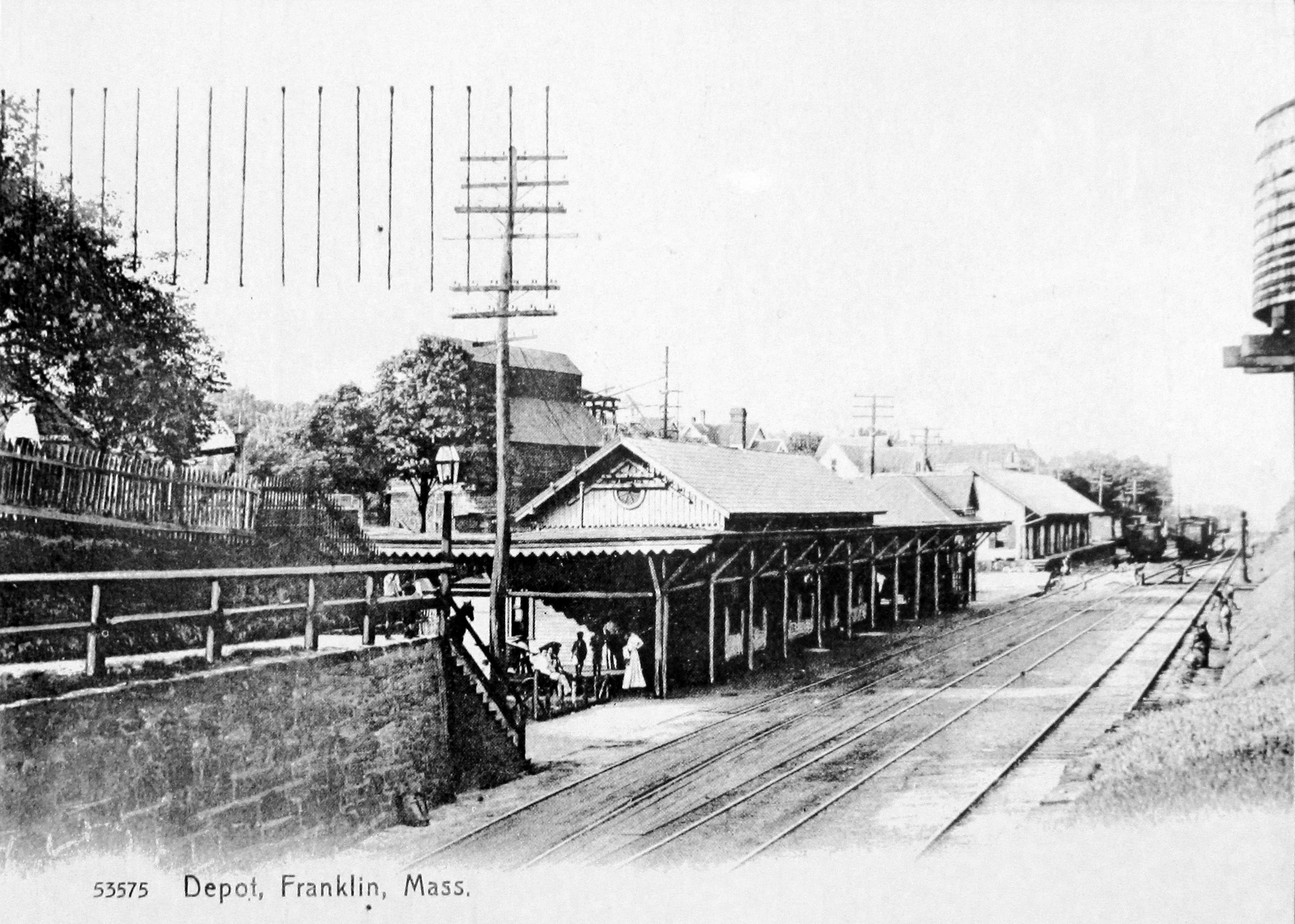
The original Franklin station in 1905

The Norfolk County Railroad opened through Franklin to Blackstone in spring 1849. The line went through several short-lived holding companies before ending up as part of the New York and New England Railroad, under which service ran to Putnam, Hartford, and Waterbury. The original wooden station was replaced with the present stucco-and-brick depot by the New Haven Railroad in 1912. It is similar in design to the existing 1906-built Needham Junction station and 1905-built Mystic station

Two branch lines diverged just south of Franklin. The Milford and Woonsocket Railroad was extended from Bellingham Junction to Franklin in 1882. The line was never particularly successful; passenger service was gone by 1920, though some Franklin trains ran to Boston via the branch and the Charles River Branch Railroad from 1926 to 1938 and in 1940. The NY&NE's Valley Falls branch operated from Franklin to Valley Falls, Rhode Island beginning in 1877. It provided the NY&NE an entrance to Providence to compete with the Boston and Providence Railroad mainline. Always a slower route than the B&P, it was abandoned by the New Haven in 1941.

=== MBTA era ===
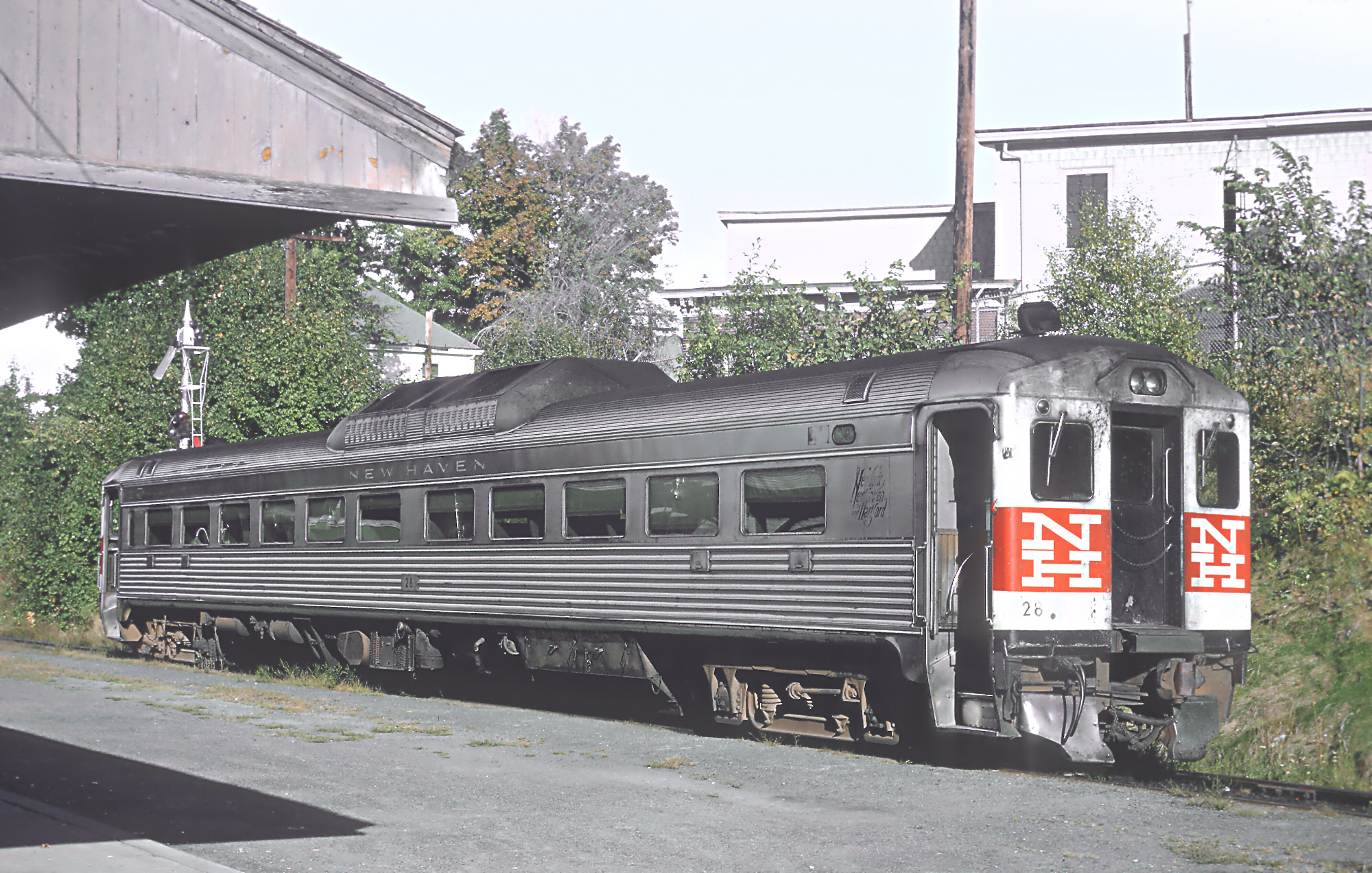
A New Haven Railroad commuter train at Franklin in September 1968

Service west of Blackstone was terminated in August 1955 after a major flood caused by Hurricane Diane washed out a bridge at Putnam. When the MBTA was formed in August 1964 to subsidize commuter rail service, Walpole was the outer limit of the funding district with guaranteed service. After the New Haven Railroad received permission to cut out-of-district service, Franklin began funding continued service to its stop. On April 24, 1966, the Blackstone Line was cut back to Franklin; several other marginal lines were cut as well. Franklin was the terminus of the line until June 2, 1988, when Forge Park/495 station was opened 3 miles to the west along the former Milford and Woonsocket line.

In 2019, the MBTA listed Franklin/Dean College as a "Tier I" accessibility priority. In 2024, the MBTA tested a temporary freestanding accessible platform design at Beverly Depot. These platforms do not require alterations to the existing platforms, thus skirting federal rules requiring full accessibility renovations when stations are modified, and were intended to provide interim accessibility at lower cost pending full reconstruction. Franklin/Dean College was one of the first four non-accessible stations to be modified with the temporary platforms, with construction beginning in 2024. The mini-high platform opened on March 17, 2025. A ribbon-cutting ceremony was held that October.
