= Medfield, Massachusetts =

- Town
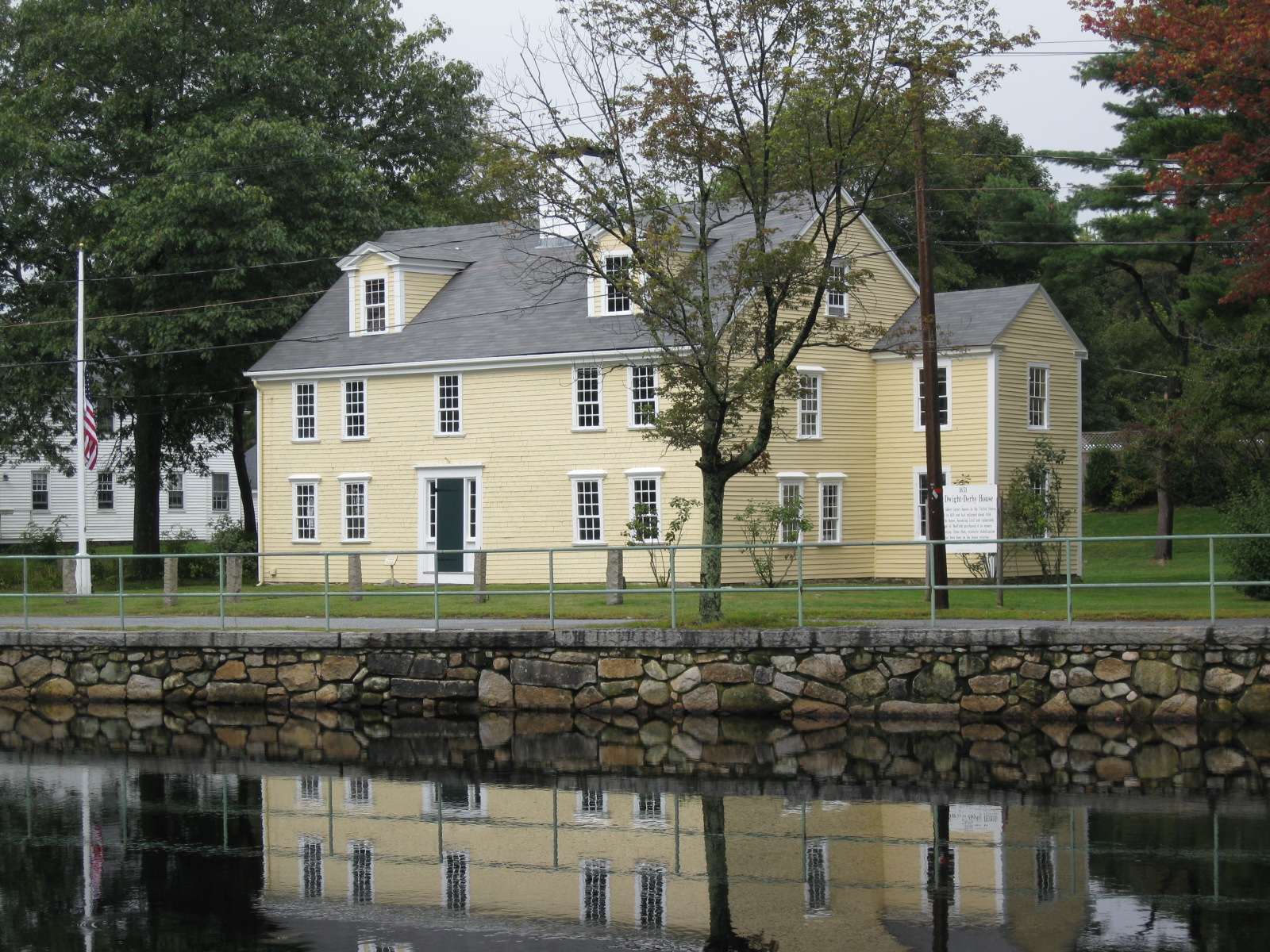
- Dwight-Derby House (1651)

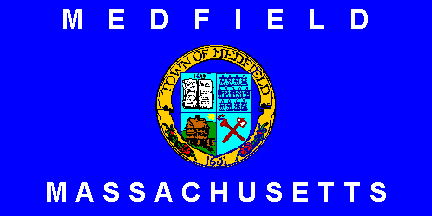
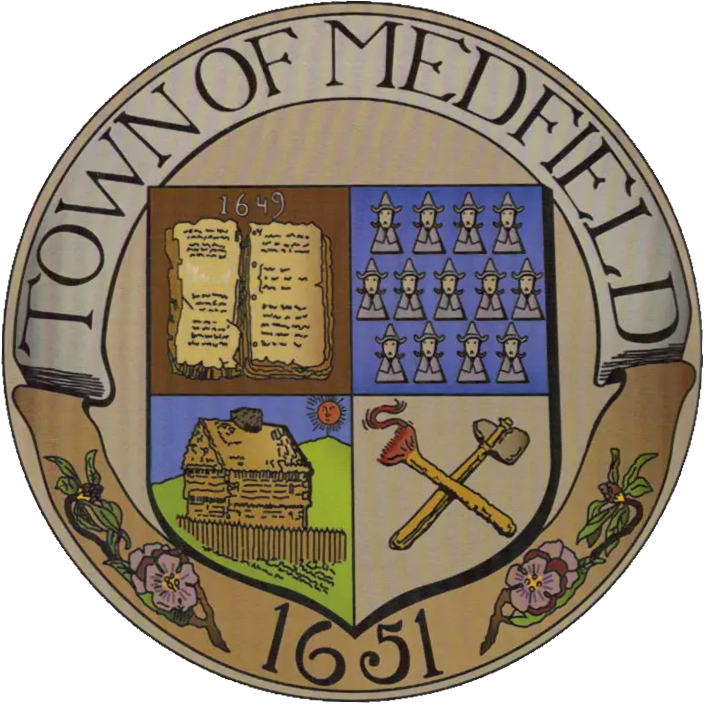
- Flag Seal

- Location in Norfolk County in Massachusetts
- Coordinates: 42°11′15″N 71°18′25″W
- Country: United States
- State: Massachusetts
- County: Norfolk
- Settled: 1649
- Incorporated: 1651

Government
  - Type: Open town meeting
  - Town Administrator: Kristen Trierweiler

Area
  - Total: 14.6 sq mi (37.8 km^{2})
  - Land: 14.5 sq mi (37.6 km^{2})
  - Water: 0.077 sq mi (0.2 km^{2})
- Elevation: 177 ft (54 m)

Population (2020)
  - Total: 12,799
  - Density: 882/sq mi (340.4/km^{2})
- Time zone: UTC-5 (Eastern)
  - Summer (DST): UTC-4 (Eastern)
- ZIP code: 02052
- Area code: 508 / 774
- FIPS code: 25-39765
- GNIS feature ID: 0618323
- Website: town.medfield.net

Medfield is a town in Norfolk County, Massachusetts, United States. The population was 12,799 according to the 2020 United States Census. The town contains the census-designated place of the same name. It is a community about 17 miles (27 km) southwest of Boston, Massachusetts, which is a 40-minute drive to Downtown Boston. Attractions include the Hinkley Pond and the Peak House.

== History ==
The territory that Medfield now occupies was, at the time of colonization, Neponset land. As part of the English settlement of the area, it was sold by the Neponset leader Chickatabot to William Pynchon in the late 1620s. In 1633, Chickatabot died in a smallpox epidemic that decimated nearby Neponset, Narragansett and Pequot communities. Because Chickatabot and Pynchon's deal left no written deed, the Massachusetts General Court ordered "those Indians who were present when Chickatabot sold lands to Mr. Pynchon, or who know where they were, to set out the bounds thereof". Fifty years later, Chickatabot's grandson Josias Wampatuck brought a land claim against Medfield and the other towns created within the borders of the Chickatabot purchase, for which he received payment. Of those lands, Dedham was the first town formed.

The majority of present-day Medfield had been granted to Dedham in 1636, but the lands on the western bank of the Charles River had been meted out by the General Court to individuals. Edward Alleyn, for example, had been granted 300 acres in 1642. Dedham asked the General Court for some of those lands and, on October 23, 1649, the Court granted the request so long as they established a separate village there within one year. Medfield (New Dedham) was first settled in 1649, principally by people who relocated from the former town. The first 13 house lots were laid out on June 19, 1650.

Dedham sent Eleazer Lusher, Joshua Fisher, Henry Phillips, John Dwight, and Daniel Fisher to map out an area three miles by four miles and the colony sent representatives to set the boundaries on the opposite side of the river. The land that Dedham contributed to the new village became Medfield, and the land the colony contributed eventually broke away to become Medway in 1713. Millis would later break away from Medway.

The separations were not without difficulty, however. When Medfield left there were disagreements about the responsibility for public debts and about land use. There were some residents who did not move to the new village who wanted rights to the meadows while others thought that the land should be given freely to those who would settle them. A compromise was reached where those moving to the new village would pay £100 to those who remained in lieu of rights to the meadows. It was later reduced to £60, if paid over three years, or £50 if paid in one year.

Tax records show that those who chose to move to the new village came from the middle class of Dedham residents. Among the first 20 men to make the move were Ralph Wheelock, Thomas Mason, Thomas Wight, John Samuel Morse and his son Daniel, John Frary Sr., Joseph Clark Sr., John Ellis, Thomas Ellis, Henry Smith, Robert Hinsdale, Timothy Dwight, James Allen, Henry Glover, Isaac Genere, and Samuel Bullen. By 1664, several of their sons would join them, as would Joshua Fisher and his son John, and several other Dedhamites. Those who moved there often moved with family members, and many would move on from Medfield to other inland communities. It is also possible that those who left Dedham for Medfield were those most disaffected by the political or social climate within the town.

Town Meeting voted to release Medfield on January 11, 1651, and the General Court agreed the following May. Medfield became the 43rd town in Massachusetts.

The Rev. Ralph Wheelock is credited with the founding of Medfield. He was the first schoolmaster of the town's school established in 1655, and now has an elementary school named after him.

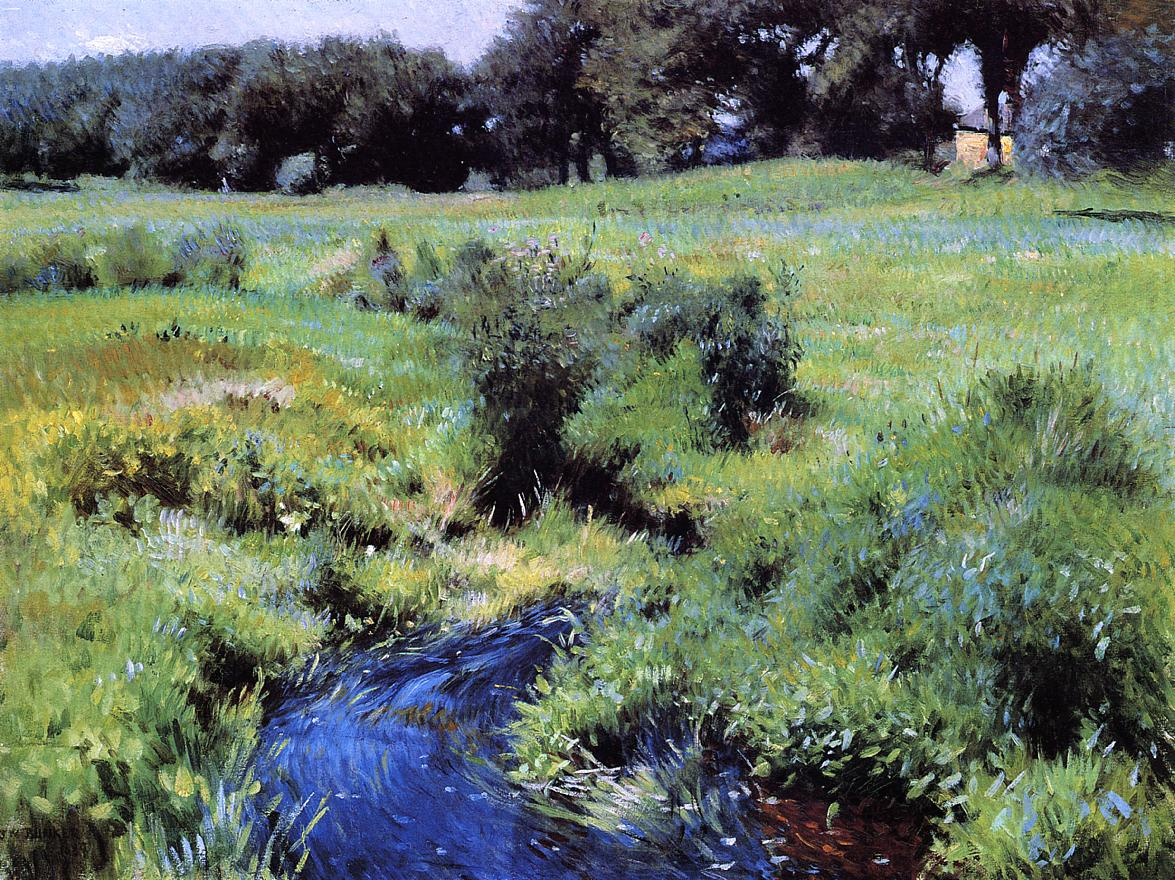
The Pool, Medfield, 1889, by Dennis Miller Bunker. Museum of Fine Arts, Boston.

Half the town (32 houses, two mills, many barns and other buildings) was destroyed by Native Americans during King Philip's War in 1675. One house, known as the Peak House, was burnt in the war but was rebuilt shortly thereafter near downtown Medfield.

== Geography ==
According to the United States Census Bureau, the town has a total area of 14.6 square miles (37.8 km^{2}), of which 14.5 square miles (37.6 km^{2}) is land and 0.1 square mile (0.2 km^{2}) (0.62%) is water. The Charles River borders almost one-third of Medfield. Medfield is surrounded by the towns Dover, Norfolk, Walpole, Millis, and Sherborn. The Charles River marks the Millis border.

== Demographics ==
Historical population
Year	Pop.	±%
1790	731	—
1850	966	+32.1%
1860	1,082	+12.0%
1870	1,142	+5.5%
1880	1,371	+20.1%
1890	1,493	+8.9%
1900	2,926	+96.0%
1910	3,466	+18.5%
1920	3,595	+3.7%
1930	4,066	+13.1%
1940	4,384	+7.8%
1950	4,549	+3.8%
1960	6,021	+32.4%
1970	9,821	+63.1%
1980	10,220	+4.1%
1990	10,531	+3.0%
2000	12,273	+16.5%
2010	12,024	−2.0%
2020	12,799	+6.4%
2023*	13,088	+2.3%
* = population estimate. Source: United States census records and Population Estimates Program data.

=== Population and housing ===
- 12,024 people, 5,284 households, and 5,462 families
- Population density = 845.8 people/sq. mi (326.6 people/km^{2})
- 5,048 housing units

Race	Population (%)
White	96.78
Black or African American	0.51
Native American	0.04
Asian	1.76
Pacific Islander	0.01
Other	0.23
Two or more races	0.68

Hispanic or Latino of any race were 0.90% of the population.

- Of the 5,284 households, 50.0% had children under the age of 18 living with them, 73.8% were married couples living together, 6.4% had a female householder with no husband present, and 18.3% were non-families. 15.5% of all households were made up of individuals, and 6.6% had someone living alone who was 65 years of age or older
- Average household size = 3.02
- Average family size = 3.41

=== Age distribution ===
- 33.6% under the age of 18
- 3.5% from 18 to 24
- 28.4% from 25 to 44
- 25.2% from 45 to 64
- 9.3% who were 65 or older
- The median age was 38 years.
- For every 100 females, there were 96.6 males, and for every 100 females age 18 and over, there were 92.4 males.

=== Income data ===
- Per capita income = $62,076
- Median household income = $133,931
- Median family income = $144,263
- About 0.8% of families and 1.4% of the population were below the poverty line, including 1.1% of those under age 18 and 1.6% of those aged 65 or over.

== Education ==
Medfield Public Schools consistently ranks among the top ten school systems in Massachusetts by the Massachusetts Comprehensive Assessment System (MCAS). As recently as 2017, Medfield was ranked by the U.S. News & World Report as the number 5 ranked school system in Massachusetts. As of 2013, Medfield High School Seniors scored an average of 591 on the SAT Critical Reading Section, 618 on the SAT Math Section, and 598 on the SAT Writing Section.

In 2005, Medfield High School and T.A. Blake Middle School switched buildings as a result of a massive construction project updating the current Medfield High School (formally Amos Clark Kingsbury High School).

Public schools:

- Memorial School, 59 Adams Street (grades K–1)
- Wheelock School, 17 Elm Street (grades 2–3)
- Dale Street School, 45 Adams Street (grades 4–5)
- Thomas A. Blake Middle School, 24 Pound Street (grades 6–8)
- Medfield High School, 88R South Street (grades 9–12)

Private schools:

- Montrose School, an independent school for girls, inspired by the teachings of the Catholic Church, 29 North Street (grades 6–12)

== Library ==
Medfield's Free Public Library began in 1873. The public library is located on Main Street. In the late 18th century some of the residents of Medfield and surrounding towns formed a subscription library, called the Medfield Social Library.

== Events ==
- On the third Saturday of September, Medfield Employers & Merchants Organization hosts Medfield Day in Medfield Center, which is an annual celebration of the town.
- On the first Friday of December, Medfield Employers & Merchants Organization hosts the annual tree lighting in Baxter Park in Medfield Center.
- On the Saturday following the first Friday of December, Medfield Employers & Merchants Organization organizes the annual Winter parade which takes place on the streets near Medfield Center.
- On the first Sunday of December, Medfield Foundation hosts the Angel Run, which is an annual 5k fundraising road race, held to raise money to support people in need in the town.

== Medfield State Hospital ==
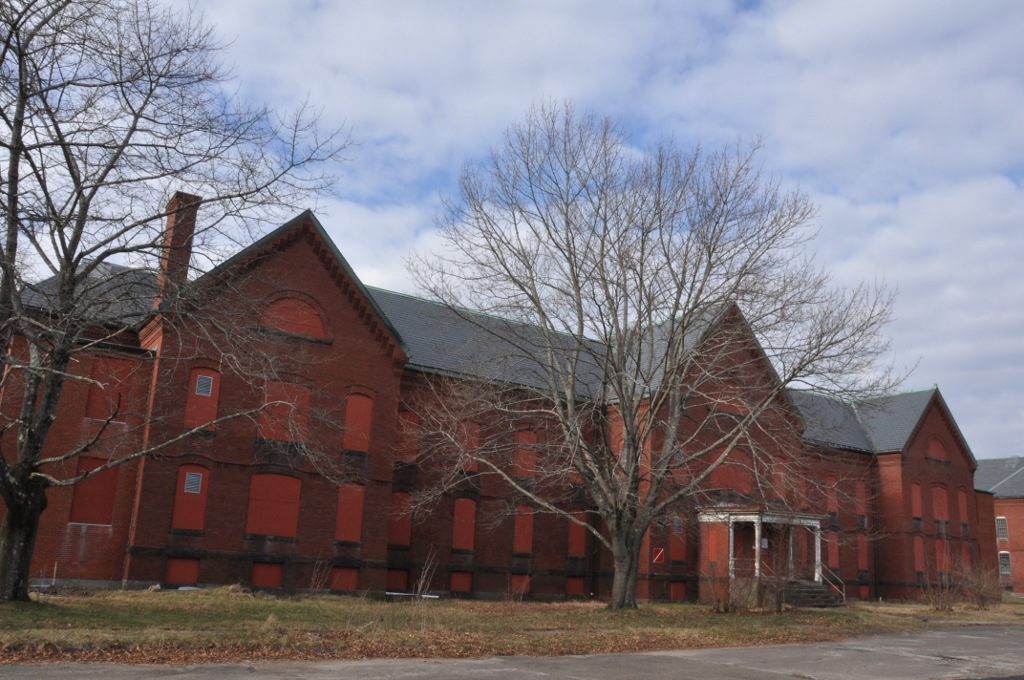
One of many abandoned buildings on the grounds of the former Medfield State Hospital

Medfield State Hospital, located at 45 Hospital Road, opened in 1896 and originally operated on 685 acres (2.77 km^{2}) of pasture. At its peak in 1952, it housed 1,500 patients. By 2001, it was down to about 300 acres (1.2 km^{2}) and employed 450 people (including four psychologists) to care for a maximum of 147 patients. The cost to the Commonwealth of Massachusetts was $21.5 million. On April 3, 2003, the doors were closed. Although the buildings are not open to the public (they have been boarded up), the grounds may be visited during daylight hours.

The Town acquired 128 acres of the hospital grounds from the state in 2014 and subsequently commissioned an award-winning Strategic Reuse Master Plan, released in 2018. https://www.mma.org/planning-community-engagement-shape-medfield-state-hospital-redevelopment/. The grounds are popular with local residents who enjoy the vast open spaces, hiking trails, and access to the Charles River through an abutting parcel owned by the state. The Town signed a 99-year lease with the Bellforge Arts Center in 2020 for renovation of the chapel and adjoining building as a venue for multiple performing and visual arts. https://bellforge.org/. In 2022 the Town sold about 45 acres including the core campus of the hospital to Trinity Financial for development in keeping with the Master Plan. https://www.town.medfield.net/1959/Medfield-State-Hospital. Trinity envisions several forms of housing and continued access to the surrounding public land according to their proposal made at a special town meeting in June, 2022.

- The film The Box was filmed at the hospital in December 2007.
- The film Shutter Island started prepping February 2008 and started filming at Medfield State Hospital in March 2008.
- The film The New Mutants started filming at the Medfield State Hospital in the summer of 2017.

== Points of interest ==
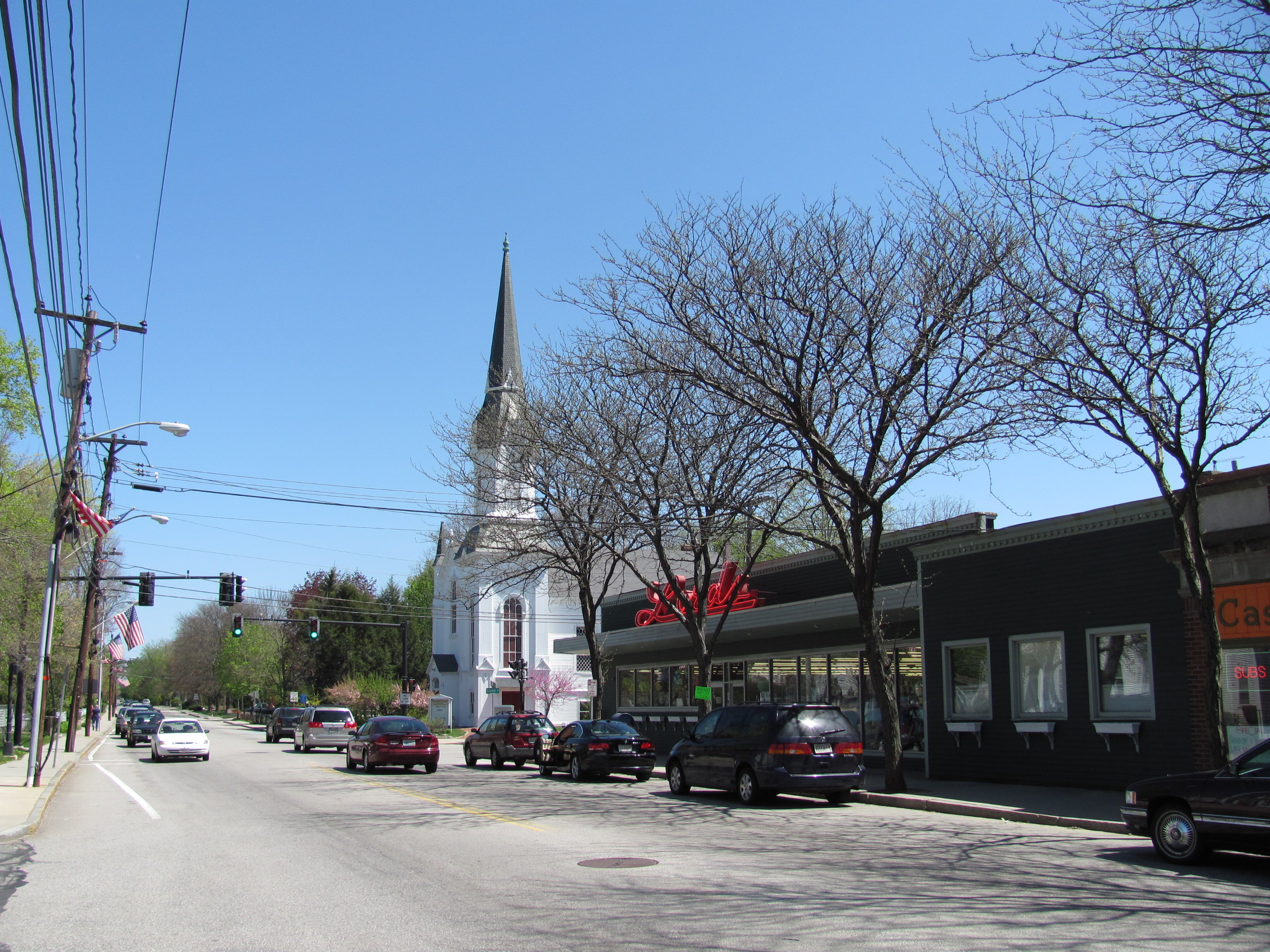
Main Street

- Rocky Woods is a 491-acre (1.99 km^{2}) reservation in the northeastern part of town. The property has 6.5 miles (10.5 km) of nature trails for hiking or biking, a few ponds for fishing, and open space for picnics and barbecues, and includes Cedar Hill (435 feet (133 m)).
- Noon Hill is a hill in Medfield at 370 feet (110 m) with a trail to its peak. There are a total of 4.5 miles (7.2 km) of trails around the hill and offer views of the hills of Walpole, Norfolk, and Gillette Stadium.
- Peak House. Burnt during the Native-American attack on the town during King Philip's War in 1676, the Peak House was rebuilt in 1680. It was turned over to the Medfield Historical Society in 1924 and restored to its original Colonial look. It is open every Sunday from 2 PM–5 PM from June to September and by appointment at other times. It is on the National Register of Historic Places and the steep roof has the highest pitch on record in Massachusetts for a 17th-century house.
- Medfield Historical Society on Pleasant Street. The Society museum contains historic artifacts and documents. The Society also owns the Peak House.
- The Dwight-Derby House: Constructed in 1697. It was long thought that the house was built in 1651, but irrefutable scientific evidence has established that this house was not built until 1697. Still, it is one of only several dozen documented 17th-century houses still standing. Numerous additions have been made to the home over the years as the property changed owners.
- Hinkley Pond, named after Vietnam fatality Stephen Hinkley, a native of Medfield, located on Green Street, is a site for public swimming and has a playground and sand area. Swimming lessons are taught on-site.
- Lowell Mason Museum and Music Center. Birthplace of Lowell Mason and a rare example of First Period American architecture and construction. Portions of the house date to 1651 according to a dendrochronology survey. A community effort saved the home from demolition and relocated it to Green Street in April 2011. The Lowell Mason Foundation maintains the house, which will house the Lowell Mason Museum, community space, and a music center.
- Kingsbury Pond, named after Amos Clark Kingsbury (a Medfield native and graduate of Medfield's High School Class of 1916) who served in the United States Marines, American Expeditionary Force, and fought in almost every major battle in France during World War I. Kingsbury Pond is located on Route 27, across the street from St. Edward's Catholic Church. It is a site for public fishing and ice skating. Fishermen have caught very small Largemouth Bass in this pond.
- Metacomet Park, named after King Philip (who was also known as Metacomet or Metacom), the chief of the Wampanoag Indians and their leader in the King Philip War. Metacomet Park is an athletic complex and activities area located at 145 Pleasant Street. It offers four tennis courts, a little league baseball diamond, a multi-use field (used for lacrosse, field hockey, and soccer), and a small playground.
- Charles River Reservation, maintained by the Massachusetts Department of Conservation and Recreation, is home to the Bill Martin Flying Field, maintained by two clubs, the Millis Model Aircraft Club and the Charles River Radio Controllers.
- Medfield Rail Trail, opened October 1, 2022, is 1.3 miles long and runs through most of the town of Medfield. It provides a "flat, easy path for walking, running, horseback riding and biking for people of all ages."

== Notable people ==
- Hannah Adams (1755–1831), Medfield native and Christian author; the first female professional writer in America
- Uzo Aduba, actress, best known as "Crazy Eyes" on Netflix's Orange Is the New Black, grew up in Medfield, and was a member of the Medfield High School Theater Society.
- Matthew Aucoin, pianist, conductor/composer with the Metropolitan Opera, Lincoln Center Theater and Chicago Symphony orchestras, opera composer and lyricist
- Jerry Bergonzi, tenor saxophonist and jazz educator; currently holds a full-time professorship at New England Conservatory
- Raymond Berry, Pro Football Hall of Fame receiver for the Baltimore Colts, and former head coach of the New England Patriots
- Steve Berthiaume, former ESPN anchor and current play-by-play broadcast announcer for the Arizona Diamondbacks
- Drew Bledsoe, retired NFL quarterback, former quarterback of the New England Patriots
- Donald E. Booth, American Diplomat and current US Special Envoy for Sudan
- Pete Carroll, coach of the Seattle Seahawks, and former coach of the University of Southern California and the New England Patriots, also lived in Medfield.
- Josh D'Amaro, CEO of The Walt Disney Company, grew up in Medfield.
- Ron Erhardt, former head coach of the New England Patriots lived in Medfield.
- Meredith Godreau (Gregory and the Hawk), American singer-songwriter born and raised in Medfield, until she was twelve when she moved to Potsdam, New York.
- Rich Gotham, president of the Boston Celtics
- John Hannah, former New England Patriots guard and Hall of Famer
- George Inness (1825–1894), artist, some of whose paintings are of Medfield in the nineteenth century.
- Ted Johnson, former linebacker of the New England Patriots lived in Medfield. Ted played for the Patriots from 1995 to 2004
- Matt Klentak, special assistant, Milwaukee Brewers
- Charles Martin Loeffler (1861–1935), a German-born American composer.
- Rick Lyle, former defensive end for the New England Patriots, lived in Medfield. Rick played for the Patriots from 2002 to 2003
- Eric Mangini, former assistant coach for the New England Patriots, lived in Medfield. Eric also coached the New York Jets and Cleveland Browns
- Lowell Mason (1792–1872), a composer of hymns and pioneer of music education in American public schools.
- Peter McNeeley, boxer.
- Tom McNeeley, boxer.
- Jason Nash, American actor and YouTube personality
- John Preston (1945–1994), author of gay erotica and editor of gay non-fiction anthologies
- Darrelle Revis, former cornerback for the New England Patriots
- Curt Schilling, former pitcher for the Boston Red Sox. His family formerly lived on Woodridge Road in a 26-acre (110,000 m^{2}) estate formerly occupied by another athlete, Drew Bledsoe. Schilling bought the home in 2003 for $4,500,001.

== Works cited ==
- Hanson, Robert Brand (1976). Dedham, Massachusetts, 1635–1890. Dedham Historical Society.
- Lockridge, Kenneth (1985). A New England town: The first hundred years: Dedham, Massachusetts, 1636-1736. Norton. p. 220. ISBN 0393954595.
